= 1914 United States House of Representatives elections =

House elections for the 64th U.S. Congress

- November 3, 1914 (Note: Maine held early elections on September 14, 1914.)

All 435 seats in the United States House of Representatives 218 seats needed for a majority
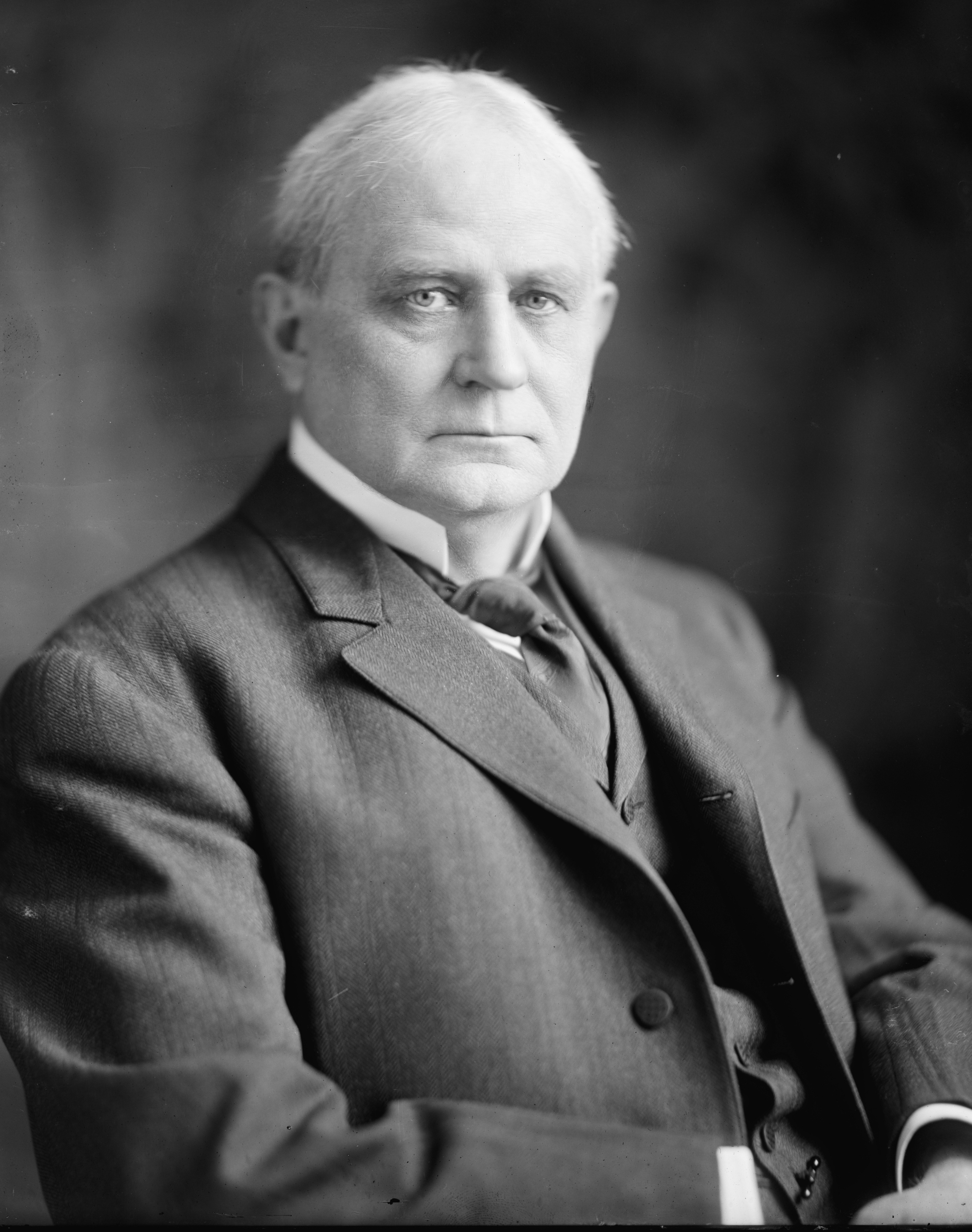

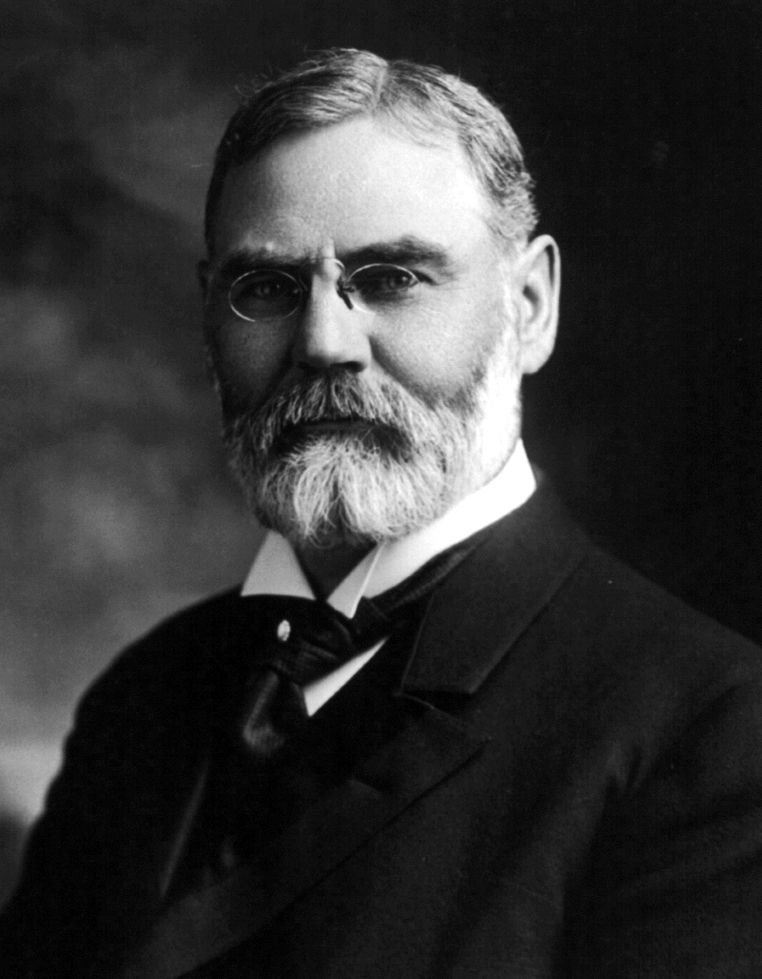
	Majority party	Minority party
Leader	Champ Clark	James Mann
Party	Democratic	Republican
Leader since	March 4, 1909	March 4, 1911
Leader's seat	Missouri 9th	Illinois 2nd
Last election	291 seats	134 seats
Seats won	230	196
Seat change	▼61	▲62
Popular vote	5,808,254	5,903,308
Percentage	42.43%	43.12%
Swing	▼0.84pp	▲4.21pp
	Third party	Fourth party
Party	Progressive	Socialist
Last election	10 seats	0 seats
Seats won	6	1
Seat change	▼4	▲1
Popular vote	1,096,530 (Note: This includes votes for those who ran primarily on the Washington Party Ballot Line.)	626,492
Percentage	8.01%	4.58%
Swing	▼1.97pp	▼3.35pp
	Fifth party	Sixth party
Party	Prohibition	Independent
Last election	0 seats	0 seats
Seats won	1	1
Seat change	▲1	▲1
Popular vote	232,285	77,188
Percentage	1.70%	0.56%
Swing	▲0.23pp	▲0.25pp
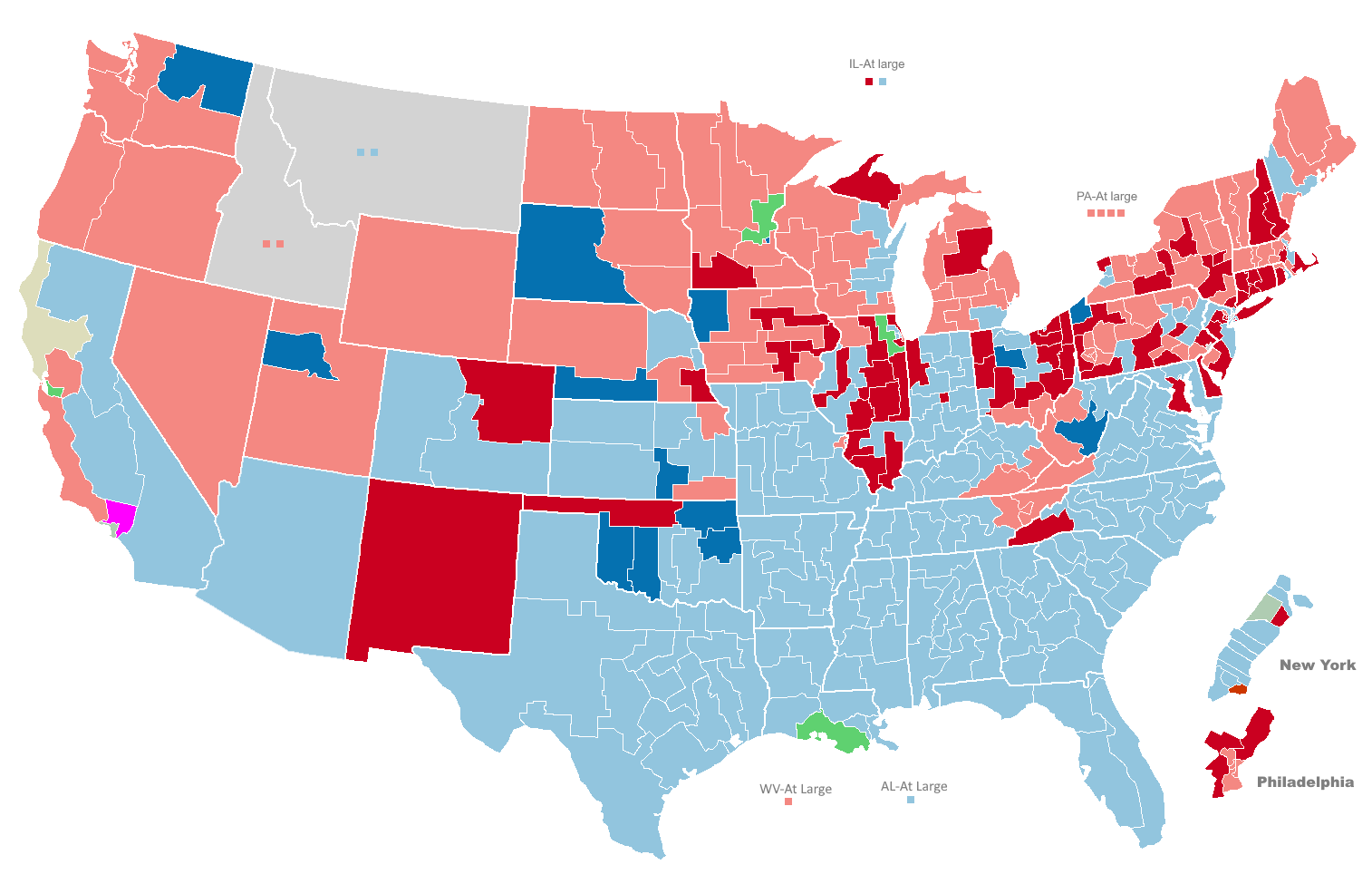
- Results: Democratic hold Democratic gain Republican hold Republican gain Progressive hold Progressive gain Independent hold Prohibition gain Socialist gain
Speaker before election
Champ Clark
Democratic
Elected Speaker
Champ Clark
Democratic

1914 United States House of Representatives elections were elections for the United States House of Representatives to elect members to serve in the 64th United States Congress. They were held for the most part on November 3, 1914, while Maine held theirs on September 14. They were held in the middle of President Woodrow Wilson's first term.

The opposition Republican Party had recovered from the split they underwent during the 1912 presidential election, and the party gained more than 60 seats from the Democratic Party, though not enough to regain control of the body. The burgeoning economy greatly aided Republicans, who pushed for pro-business principles and took credit for the success that had been reached in the industrial sector. Many progressive Republicans rejoined the Republican Party, but six remained under the Progressive Party banner in the new Congress. In addition, William Kent was re-elected in California's 1st congressional district as an independent, and two minor party candidates were elected: Charles H. Randall, a Prohibition Party member, in California's 9th congressional district; and Meyer London, a Socialist Party member, in New York's 12th congressional district.

The election was the first of four times in the 20th century in which either party won the House majority without winning the popular vote, with the subsequent three instances occurring in 1942, 1952, and 1996; Democrats won the House majority without winning the popular vote in the former election, while Republicans did so in the latter two.

== Election summaries ==
↓
230	9	196
Democratic	(Note: There were six Progressives, one Socialist, one Prohibitionist, and one Independent)	Republican

State	Type	Total seats	Democratic		Republican		Progressive		Others	
State	Type	Total seats	Seats	Change	Seats	Change	Seats	Change	Seats	Change
Alabama	Districts +at-large	10	10	Steady	0	Steady	0	Steady	0	Steady
Arizona	At-large	1	1	Steady	0	Steady	0	Steady	0	Steady
Arkansas	District	7	7	Steady	0	Steady	0	Steady	0	Steady
California	District	11	3	Steady	4	▼1	2	Steady	2 (Note: 1 Prohibition Party member elected, and 1 Independent re-elected. Previous election saw the Independent elected.)	▲1
Colorado	Districts	4	3	▼1	1	▲1	0	Steady	0	Steady
Connecticut	District	5	0	▼5	5	▲5	0	Steady	0	Steady
Delaware	At-large	1	0	▼1	1	▲1	0	Steady	0	Steady
Florida	Districts	4	4	Steady	0	Steady	0	Steady	0	Steady
Georgia	District	12	12	Steady	0	Steady	0	Steady	0	Steady
Idaho	At-large	2	0	Steady	2	Steady	0	Steady	0	Steady
Illinois	Districts +at-large	27	10	▼10	16	▲11	1	▼1	0	Steady
Indiana	District	13	11	▼2	2	▲2	0	Steady	0	Steady
Iowa	District	11	1	▼2	10	▲2	0	Steady	0	Steady
Kansas	District	8	6	▲1	2	▼1	0	Steady	0	Steady
Kentucky	District	11	9	Steady	2	Steady	0	Steady	0	Steady
Louisiana	District	8	7	▼1	0	Steady	1	▲1	0	Steady
Maine (Note: Maine elections held early.)	District	4	1	Steady	3	Steady	0	Steady	0	Steady
Maryland	District	6	5	▼1	1	▲1	0	Steady	0	Steady
Massachusetts	District	16	4	▼3	12	▲3	0	Steady	0	Steady
Michigan	Districts	13	2	Steady	11	▲1	0	▼1	0	Steady
Minnesota	Districts	10	1	Steady	8	▼1	1	▲1	0	Steady
Mississippi	District	8	8	Steady	0	Steady	0	Steady	0	Steady
Missouri	District	16	14	Steady	2	Steady	0	Steady	0	Steady
Montana	At-large	2	2	Steady	0	Steady	0	Steady	0	Steady
Nebraska	District	6	3	Steady	3	Steady	0	Steady	0	Steady
Nevada	At-large	1	0	Steady	1	Steady	0	Steady	0	Steady
New Hampshire	District	2	0	▼2	2	▲2	0	Steady	0	Steady
New Jersey	District	12	4	▼7	8	▲7	0	Steady	0	Steady
New Mexico	At-large	1	0	▼1	1	▲1	0	Steady	0	Steady
New York	District	43	19	▼12	22	▲11	1	Steady	1	▲1
North Carolina	District	10	9	▼1	1	▲1	0	Steady	0	Steady
North Dakota	District	3	0	Steady	3	Steady	0	Steady	0	Steady
Ohio	Districts	22	9	▼10	13	▲10	0	Steady	0	Steady
Oklahoma	Districts	8	7	▲1	1	▼1	0	Steady	0	Steady
Oregon	District	3	0	Steady	3	Steady	0	Steady	0	Steady
Pennsylvania	Districts +4 at-large	36	6	▼6	30	▲8	0	▼2	0	Steady
Rhode Island	District	3	1	▼1	2	▲2	0	Steady	0	Steady
South Carolina	District	7	7	Steady	0	Steady	0	Steady	0	Steady
South Dakota	District	3	1	▲1	2	▼1	0	Steady	0	Steady
Tennessee	District	10	8	Steady	2	Steady	0	Steady	0	Steady
Texas	Districts +2 at-large	18	18	Steady	0	Steady	0	Steady	0	Steady
Utah	District	2	1	▲1	1	▼1	0	Steady	0	Steady
Vermont	District	2	0	Steady	2	Steady	0	Steady	0	Steady
Virginia	District	10	9	Steady	1	Steady	0	Steady	0	Steady
Washington	Districts	5	1	▲1	4	▲1	0	▼2	0	Steady
West Virginia	Districts +at-large	6	3	▲1	3	▼1	0	Steady	0	Steady
Wisconsin	District	11	3	Steady	8	Steady	0	Steady	0	Steady
Wyoming	At-large	1	0	Steady	1	Steady	0	Steady	0	Steady
Total		435	230; 52.9%	▼61	196; 45.1%	▲63	6; 1.4%	▼3	3 (Note: 1 Socialist, 1 Prohibition, and 1 Independent.); 0.7%	▲2

Popular vote
Republican	43.12%
Democratic	42.43%
Progressive	8.01%
Socialist	4.58%
Prohibition	1.70%
Independent	0.56%
Others	0.00%

House seats
Democratic	52.87%
Republican	45.06%
Progressive	1.38%
Socialist	0.23%
Prohibition	0.23%
Independent	0.23%

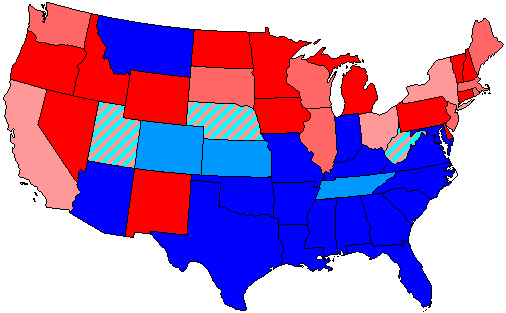
House seats by party holding plurality in state: 80+% to 100% Democratic / 80+% to 100% Republican; 60+% to 80% Democratic / 60+% to 80% Republican; Up to 60% Democratic / Up to 60% Republican

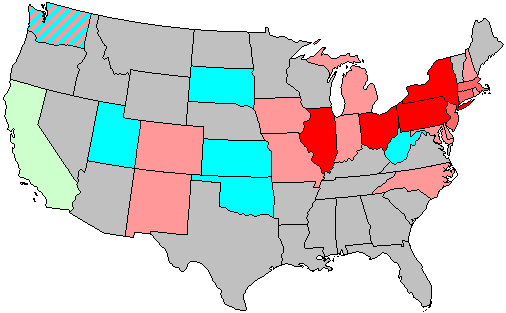
Net gain in party representation: 6+ Democratic gain / / 6+ Republican gain; 3–5 Democratic gain / / 3–5 Republican gain; 1–2 Democratic gain / 1–2 Progressive gain / 1–2 Republican gain; no net change

== Early election date ==
Maine held its elections early, on September 14, 1914. There had previously been multiple states with earlier elections, but Maine was the only one remaining by 1914 (after Vermont stopped holding its elections early, after 1912). Maine would continue to hold elections early, in September, until 1958.

== Special elections ==
District	Incumbent			This race	
District	Member	Party	First elected	Results	Candidates
Iowa 2	Irvin S. Pepper	Democratic	1910	Incumbent died December 22, 1913. New representative elected February 10, 1914. Democratic hold.	▌ ✓ Henry Vollmer (Democratic) 44.50%; ▌Harry E. Hull (Republican) 38.10%; ▌Charles P. Hanley (Progressive) 13.07%; ▌Lee W. Lang (Socialist) 3.48%; ▌M. L. Christian (Prohibition) 0.68%
Massachusetts 12	James Michael Curley	Democratic	1910	Incumbent resigned February 4, 1914, to become Mayor of Boston. New member elected April 7, 1914. Democratic hold.	▌ ✓ James A. Gallivan (Democratic) 53.51%; ▌Frank L. Brier (Republican) 24.41%; ▌James B. Connolly (Progressive) 22.07%
New Jersey 7	Robert G. Bremner	Democratic	1912	Incumbent died February 5, 1914. New member elected April 7, 1914. Republican gain.	▌ ✓ Dow H. Drukker (Republican) 49.04%; ▌James J. Byrne (Democratic) 24.21%; ▌Gordon Demarest (Socialist) 23.40%; ▌Henry C. Whitehead (Progressive) 2.87%
Alabama 8	William N. Richardson	Democratic	1900 (special)	Incumbent died March 31, 1914. New member elected May 11, 1914. Democratic hold.	▌ ✓ Christopher C. Harris (Democratic) 100%
Alabama 3	Henry D. Clayton Jr.	Democratic	1896	Incumbent resigned May 25, 1914, to become Judge for the Middle and Northern District of Alabama. New member elected June 29, 1914. Democratic hold. Winner was not elected to the next term; see below.	▌ ✓ William O. Mulkey (Democratic) 53.70%; ▌John J. Speight (Democratic) 46.30%
Georgia 10	Thomas W. Hardwick	Democratic	1902	Incumbent resigned November 2, 1914, to become U.S. Senator. New member elected November 3, 1914. Democratic hold.	▌ ✓ Carl Vinson (Democratic) 100%
Maryland 1	James Harry Covington	Democratic	1908	Incumbent resigned September 30, 1914, to become Chief Justice of the Supreme Court of the District of Columbia. New member elected November 3, 1914. Democratic hold.	▌ ✓ Jesse Price (Democratic) 74.69%; ▌Thomas S. Hodson (Progressive) 25.32%

== Alabama ==
At-Large results: Abercrombie (D): 50–60%; 60–70%; 70–80%; 80–90% 90–100% 100%; Abercrombie (R): 60–70%; Taylor: 50–60%

District	Incumbent			This race	
District	Member	Party	First elected	Results	Candidates
Alabama 1	George W. Taylor	Democratic	1896	Incumbent retired. Democratic hold.	▌ ✓ Oscar Lee Gray (Democratic) Uncontested
Alabama 2	S. Hubert Dent Jr.	Democratic	1908	Incumbent re-elected.	▌ ✓ S. Hubert Dent Jr. (Democratic) Uncontested
Alabama 3	William Oscar Mulkey	Democratic	1914 (special)	Incumbent retired. Democratic hold.	▌ ✓ Henry B. Steagall (Democratic) Uncontested
Alabama 4	Fred L. Blackmon	Democratic	1908	Incumbent re-elected.	▌ ✓ Fred L. Blackmon (Democratic) Uncontested
Alabama 5	J. Thomas Heflin	Democratic	1904 (special)	Incumbent re-elected.	▌ ✓ J. Thomas Heflin (Democratic) Uncontested
Alabama 6	Richmond P. Hobson	Democratic	1906	Incumbent lost renomination. Democratic hold.	▌ ✓ William B. Oliver (Democratic) 79.68%; ▌Samuel L. Studdard (Republican) 20.32%
Alabama 7	John L. Burnett	Democratic	1898	Incumbent re-elected.	▌ ✓ John L. Burnett (Democratic) 53.07%; ▌Thomas H. Stephens (Republican) 41.25%; ▌David A. Morton (Progressive) 3.93%; ▌D. W. Jarrett (Unknown) 1.75%
Alabama 8	Oscar Underwood	Democratic	1896	Incumbent retired to run for U.S. Senator. Democratic hold.	▌ ✓ George Huddleston (Democratic) 83.70%; ▌Robert Fullenweider (Republican) 16.30%
Alabama 9	Christopher C. Harris	Democratic	1914 (special)	Incumbent retired. Democratic hold.	▌ ✓ Edward B. Almon (Democratic) 96.63%; ▌Emil Boeglin (Socialist) 2.00%; ▌William E. Hotchkiss (Progressive) 1.38%
Alabama at-large	John Abercrombie	Democratic	1912	Incumbent re-elected.	▌ ✓ John Abercrombie (Democratic) 78.00%; ▌James F. Abercrombie (Republican) 15.93%; ▌G. A. Taylor (Progressive) 4.65%; ▌J. C. Maxwell (Socialist) 1.42%

== Arizona ==
District	Incumbent			This race	
District	Member	Party	First elected	Results	Candidates
Arizona at-large	Carl Hayden	Democratic	1911	Incumbent re-elected.	▌ ✓ Carl Hayden (Democratic) 74.57%; ▌Henry L. Eads (Republican) 16.98%; ▌Ulrich Grill (Socialist) 8.45%

== Arkansas ==
District	Incumbent			This race	
District	Member	Party	First elected	Results	Candidates
Arkansas 1	Thaddeus H. Caraway	Democratic	1912	Incumbent re-elected.	▌ ✓ Thaddeus H. Caraway (Democratic) Uncontested
Arkansas 2	William A. Oldfield	Democratic	1908	Incumbent re-elected.	▌ ✓ William A. Oldfield (Democratic) Uncontested
Arkansas 3	John C. Floyd	Democratic	1904	Incumbent retired. Democratic hold.	▌ ✓ John N. Tillman (Democratic) 61.76%; ▌W. N. Ivie (Republican) 33.26%; ▌L. R. Putnam (Progressive) 4.98%
Arkansas 4	Otis Wingo	Democratic	1912	Incumbent re-elected.	▌ ✓ Otis Wingo (Democratic) 81.99%; ▌L. C. Packard (Progressive) 18.01%
Arkansas 5	Henderson M. Jacoway	Democratic	1910	Incumbent re-elected.	▌ ✓ Henderson M. Jacoway (Democratic) Uncontested
Arkansas 6	Samuel M. Taylor	Democratic	1912	Incumbent re-elected.	▌ ✓ Samuel M. Taylor (Democratic) Uncontested
Arkansas 7	William S. Goodwin	Democratic	1910	Incumbent re-elected.	▌ ✓ William S. Goodwin (Democratic) Uncontested

== California ==
District	Incumbent			This race	
District	Member	Party	First elected	Results	Candidates
California 1	William Kent	Independent	1910	Incumbent re-elected.	▌ ✓ William Kent (Independent) 48.1%; ▌Edward H. Hart (Republican) 38.3%; ▌O. F. Meldon (Democratic) 10.8%; ▌Henry P. Stripp (Prohibition) 2.8%
California 2	John E. Raker	Democratic	1910	Incumbent re-elected.	▌ ✓ John E. Raker (Democratic) 64.7%; ▌James T. Matlock (Republican) 31.2%; ▌W. P. Fassett (Prohibition) 4.1%
California 3	Charles F. Curry	Republican	1912	Incumbent re-elected.	▌ ✓ Charles F. Curry (Republican) 85.0%; ▌David T. Ross (Socialist) 8.7%; ▌Edwin F. Van Vlear (Prohibition) 6.3%
California 4	Julius Kahn	Republican	1898	Incumbent re-elected.	▌ ✓ Julius Kahn (Republican) 69.1%; ▌Henry Colombat (Democratic) 22.8%; ▌Allen K. Gifford (Socialist) 6.6%; ▌J. C. Westenberg (Prohibition) 1.5%
California 5	John I. Nolan	Republican	1912	Incumbent re-elected.	▌ ✓ John I. Nolan (Republican) 83.3%; ▌Mads Peter Christensen (Socialist) 11.4%; ▌Frederick Head (Prohibition) 5.3%
California 6	Joseph R. Knowland	Republican	1904	Incumbent retired. Progressive gain.	▌ ✓ John A. Elston (Progressive) 44.4%; ▌George H. Derrick (Republican) 37.7%; ▌Howard H. Caldwell (Socialist) 13.9%; ▌Harlow E. Wolcott (Progressive) 3.9%
California 7	Denver S. Church	Democratic	1912	Incumbent re-elected.	▌ ✓ Denver S. Church (Democratic) 49.9%; ▌A. M. Drew (Republican) 31.8%; ▌Henry M. McKee (Socialist) 9.9%; ▌Don A. Allen (Prohibition) 8.3%
California 8	Everis A. Hayes	Republican	1904	Incumbent re-elected.	▌ ✓ Everis A. Hayes (Republican) 49.1%; ▌Lewis Dan Bohnett (Progressive) 45.3%; ▌Joseph Merritt Horton (Prohibition) 5.6%
California 9	Charles W. Bell	Progressive	1912	Incumbent lost re-election. Prohibition gain.	▌ ✓ Charles H. Randall (Prohibition) 30.9%; ▌Charles W. Bell (Progressive) 30.3%; ▌Frank C. Roberts (Republican) 27.7%; ▌Henry A. Hart (Socialist) 11.1%
California 10	William Stephens	Progressive	1910	Incumbent re-elected.	▌ ✓ William Stephens (Progressive) 38.4%; ▌Henry Z. Osborne (Republican) 28.9%; ▌Nathan Newby (Democratic) 15.5%; ▌Ralph L. Criswell (Socialist) 13.0%; ▌Henry Clay Needham (Prohibition) 4.3%
California 11	William Kettner	Democratic	1912	Incumbent re-elected.	▌ ✓ William Kettner (Democratic) 52.7%; ▌James C. Needham (Republican) 27.9%; ▌James S. Edwards (Prohibition) 12.7%; ▌Casper Bauer (Socialist) 6.7%

== Colorado ==
District	Incumbent			This race	
District	Member	Party	First elected	Results	Candidates
Colorado 1	George John Kindel	Democratic	1912	Incumbent retired to run for U.S. Senator. Democratic hold.	▌ ✓ Benjamin Hilliard (Democratic) 40.6%; ▌Horace F. Phelps (Republican) 33.4%; ▌Archibald A. Lee (Progressive) 13.5%; ▌Atterson W. Rucker (Independent) 8.4%; ▌Benjamin Blumenberg (Socialist) 4.1%
Colorado 2	Harry H. Seldomridge	Democratic	1912	Incumbent lost re-election. Republican gain.	▌ ✓ Charles B. Timberlake (Republican) 45.7%; ▌Harry H. Seldomridge (Democratic) 42.0%; ▌Charles E. Fisher (Progressive) 12.3%
Colorado 3	Edward Keating; Redistricted from the at-large district	Democratic	1912	Incumbent re-elected.	▌ ✓ Edward Keating (Democratic) 53.3%; ▌Neil N. McLean (Republican) 46.7%
Colorado 4	Edward T. Taylor; Redistricted from the at-large district	Democratic	1908	Incumbent re-elected.	▌ ✓ Edward T. Taylor (Democratic) 57.8%; ▌H. J. Baird (Republican) 32.7%; ▌George Kunkle (Socialist) 9.5%

== Connecticut ==
District	Incumbent			This race	
District	Member	Party	First elected	Results	Candidates
Connecticut 1	Augustine Lonergan	Democratic	1912	Incumbent lost re-election. Republican gain.	▌ ✓ P. Davis Oakey (Republican) 47.2%; ▌Augustine Lonergan (Democratic) 45.2%; ▌Fred E. Duffy (Progressive) 4.5%; ▌Martin J. Connolly (Socialist) 2.8%; Others: ▌John C. Bidwell (Prohibition) 1.0%; ▌Ernest Mohl (Socialist Labor) 0.4%
Connecticut 2	Bryan F. Mahan	Democratic	1912	Incumbent lost re-election. Republican gain.	▌ ✓ Richard P. Freeman (Republican) 52.5%; ▌Bryan F. Mahan (Democratic) 41.0%; ▌Deilbert O. Daniels (Progressive) 3.9%; Others: ▌Albert Boardman (Socialist) 1.7%; ▌William P. Barstow (Prohibition) 0.9%
Connecticut 3	Thomas L. Reilly	Democratic	1912	Incumbent lost re-election. Republican gain.	▌ ✓ John Q. Tilson (Republican) 46.5%; ▌Thomas L. Reilly (Democratic) 44.3%; ▌Martin F. Plunkett (Socialist) 4.6%; ▌Yandell Henderson (Progressive) 3.4%; Others: ▌Charles W. Hulse (Prohibition) 0.8%; ▌Gustave Lagner (Socialist Labor) 0.5%
Connecticut 4	Jeremiah Donovan	Democratic	1912	Incumbent lost re-election. Republican gain.	▌ ✓ Ebenezer J. Hill (Republican) 51.0%; ▌Jeremiah Donovan (Democratic) 41.8%; ▌Dewitt C. Turner (Socialist) 3.3%; ▌George F. Shepard (Progressive) 3.1%; Others: ▌Milton F. Wittlen (Prohibition) 0.5%; ▌Edward Pryor (Socialist Labor) 0.3%
Connecticut 5	William Kennedy	Democratic	1912	Incumbent lost re-election. Republican gain.	▌ ✓ James P. Glynn (Republican) 48.9%; ▌William Kennedy (Democratic) 43.3%; ▌Thomas J. Wall (Progressive) 3.6%; ▌Frederick W. Bill (Socialist) 3.6%; ▌Henry B. Peck (Socialist Labor) 0.6%

== Delaware ==
District	Incumbent			This race	
District	Member	Party	First elected	Results	Candidates
Delaware at-large	Franklin Brockson	Democratic	1912	Incumbent lost re-election. Republican gain.	▌ ✓ Thomas W. Miller (Republican) 50.14%; ▌Franklin Brockson (Democratic) 45.24%; ▌James H. Anderson (Prohibition) 3.62%; ▌William H. Connor (Socialist) 1.01%

== Florida ==
An at-large district had been created in 1912 for a newly apportioned seat. The at-large district was eliminated in 1914 and the 4th district created.

District	Incumbent			This race	
District	Member	Party	First elected	Results	Candidates
Florida 1	Stephen M. Sparkman	Democratic	1894	Incumbent re-elected.	▌ ✓ Stephen M. Sparkman (Democratic) 99.3%; ▌H. B. Jeffers (Independent) 0.7%
Florida 2	Frank Clark	Democratic	1904	Incumbent re-elected.	▌ ✓ Frank Clark (Democratic) Uncontested
Florida 3	Emmett Wilson	Democratic	1912	Incumbent re-elected.	▌ ✓ Emmett Wilson (Democratic) 98.8%; ▌E. Wentworth (Independent) 1.2%
Florida 4	Claude L'Engle; Redistricted from the at-large district	Democratic	1912	Incumbent lost renomination. Democratic hold.	▌ ✓ William J. Sears (Democratic) Uncontested

== Georgia ==
District	Incumbent			This race	
District	Member	Party	First elected	Results	Candidates
Georgia 1	Charles G. Edwards	Democratic	1906	Incumbent re-elected.	▌ ✓ Charles G. Edwards (Democratic) Uncontested
Georgia 2	Frank Park	Democratic	1913 (special)	Incumbent re-elected.	▌ ✓ Frank Park (Democratic) Uncontested
Georgia 3	Charles R. Crisp	Democratic	1912	Incumbent re-elected.	▌ ✓ Charles R. Crisp (Democratic) Uncontested
Georgia 4	William C. Adamson	Democratic	1896	Incumbent re-elected.	▌ ✓ William C. Adamson (Democratic) Uncontested
Georgia 5	William S. Howard	Democratic	1896	Incumbent re-elected.	▌ ✓ William S. Howard (Democratic) 88.19%; ▌R. A. Dewar (Progressive) 11.81%
Georgia 6	Charles L. Bartlett	Democratic	1896	Incumbent retired. Democratic hold.	▌ ✓ James W. Wise (Democratic) Uncontested
Georgia 7	Gordon Lee	Democratic	1904	Incumbent re-elected.	▌ ✓ Gordon Lee (Democratic) Uncontested
Georgia 8	Samuel J. Tribble	Democratic	1910	Incumbent re-elected.	▌ ✓ Samuel J. Tribble (Democratic) Uncontested
Georgia 9	Thomas M. Bell	Democratic	1904	Incumbent re-elected.	▌ ✓ Thomas M. Bell (Democratic) Uncontested
Georgia 10	Carl Vinson	Democratic	1914 (special)	Incumbent re-elected.	▌ ✓ Carl Vinson (Democratic) Uncontested
Georgia 11	John R. Walker	Democratic	1912	Incumbent re-elected.	▌ ✓ John R. Walker (Democratic) Uncontested
Georgia 12	Dudley M. Hughes	Democratic	1912	Incumbent re-elected.	▌ ✓ Dudley M. Hughes (Democratic) Uncontested

== Idaho ==
District	Incumbent			This race	
District	Member	Party	First elected	Results	Candidates
Idaho at-large 2 seats on a general ticket	Burton L. French	Republican	1910	Incumbent retired to run for U.S. Senator. Republican hold.	▌ ✓ Addison T. Smith (Republican) 22.63%; ▌ ✓ Robert M. McCracken (Republican) 21.91%; ▌James H. Forney (Democratic) 19.82%; ▌Bert H. Miller (Democratic) 18.46%; ▌Charles W. Luck (Progressive) 4.14%; ▌A. B. Clark (Socialist) 4.04%; ▌G. W. Belloit (Socialist) 4.02%; ▌E. H. Rettig (Progressive) 3.69%; Others: ▌R. P. Logan (Prohibition) 0.66%; ▌J. J. Pugh (Prohibition) 0.64%
Idaho at-large 2 seats on a general ticket	Addison T. Smith	Republican	1912	Incumbent re-elected.	▌ ✓ Addison T. Smith (Republican) 22.63%; ▌ ✓ Robert M. McCracken (Republican) 21.91%; ▌James H. Forney (Democratic) 19.82%; ▌Bert H. Miller (Democratic) 18.46%; ▌Charles W. Luck (Progressive) 4.14%; ▌A. B. Clark (Socialist) 4.04%; ▌G. W. Belloit (Socialist) 4.02%; ▌E. H. Rettig (Progressive) 3.69%; Others: ▌R. P. Logan (Prohibition) 0.66%; ▌J. J. Pugh (Prohibition) 0.64%

== Illinois ==
District	Incumbent			This race	
District	Member	Party	First elected	Results	Candidates
Illinois 1	Martin B. Madden	Republican	1904	Incumbent re-elected.	▌ ✓ Martin B. Madden (Republican) 53.22%; ▌James M. Quinlan (Democratic) 36.92%; ▌Henry M. Ashton (Progressive) 7.16%; ▌Charles Leffler (Socialist) 2.70%
Illinois 2	James R. Mann	Republican	1896	Incumbent re-elected.	▌ ✓ James R. Mann (Republican) 48.47%; ▌Mark B. O'Leary (Democratic) 26.78%; ▌John C. Vaughan (Progressive) 19.08%; ▌Thomas P. Costello (Socialist) 5.68%
Illinois 3	George E. Gorman	Democratic	1912	Incumbent retired. Republican gain.	▌ ✓ William W. Wilson (Republican) 44.91%; ▌Joseph E. Pendergast (Democratic) 40.31%; ▌William C. Lewis (Progressive) 9.71%; ▌George W. Stone (Socialist) 5.08%
Illinois 4	James T. McDermott	Democratic	1912	Incumbent resigned and re-elected to fill his own seat. Democratic hold.	▌ ✓ James T. McDermott (Democratic) 58.16%; ▌William W. Wilcox (Republican) 30.67%; ▌Harry P. Turner (Socialist) 6.26%; ▌Joseph Finder (Progressive) 4.92%
Illinois 5	Adolph J. Sabath	Democratic	1906	Incumbent re-elected.	▌ ✓ Adolph J. Sabath (Democratic) 54.19%; ▌Abram J. Harris (Republican) 23.98%; ▌E. F. Napieralski (Progressive) 14.38%; ▌Jacob Danholf (Socialist) 7.45%
Illinois 6	James McAndrews	Democratic	1900; 1904 (retired); 1912	Incumbent re-elected.	▌ ✓ James McAndrews (Democratic) 45.52%; ▌Fredrick E. Coyne (Republican) 34.14%; ▌Robert F. Kolb (Progressive) 12.14%; ▌Frank L. Wood (Socialist) 8.20%
Illinois 7	Frank Buchanan	Democratic	1910	Incumbent re-elected.	▌ ✓ Frank Buchanan (Democratic) 39.32%; ▌Niels Juul (Republican) 35.40%; ▌Carl D. Thompson (Socialist) 13.47%; ▌Charles S. Stewart (Progressive) 11.82%
Illinois 8	Thomas Gallagher	Democratic	1908	Incumbent re-elected.	▌ ✓ Thomas Gallagher (Democratic) 69.49%; ▌Edward I. Williams (Republican) 19.74%; ▌Henry Anielewski (Socialist) 6.43%; ▌Roy M. Harmon (Progressive) 4.34%
Illinois 9	Frederick A. Britten	Republican	1912	Incumbent re-elected.	▌ ✓ Frederick A. Britten (Republican) 43.22%; ▌Oscar F. Nelson (Democratic) 31.36%; ▌R. T. Crane (Progressive) 20.42%; ▌Frank Shiflersmith (Socialist) 5.00%
Illinois 10	Charles M. Thomson	Progressive	1912	Incumbent lost re-election. Republican gain.	▌ ✓ George E. Foss (Republican) 38.78%; ▌John F. Waters (Democratic) 28.15%; ▌Charles Thomson (Progressive) 28.03%; ▌John M. Work (Socialist) 5.04%
Illinois 11	Ira C. Copley	Republican	1910	Incumbent re-elected as a Progressive. Progressive gain.	▌ ✓ Ira C. Copley (Progressive) 40.53%; ▌Frank W. Shepherd (Republican) 37.94%; ▌John A. Logan (Democratic) 20.07%; ▌H. H. Nicodemus (Socialist) 1.46%
Illinois 12	William H. Hinebaugh	Progressive	1910	Incumbent lost re-election. Republican gain.	▌ ✓ Charles Eugene Fuller (Republican) 50.81%; ▌William H. Hinebaugh (Progressive) 23.68%; ▌George V. B. Weeks (Democratic) 21.31%; ▌George North Taylor (Socialist) 4.20%
Illinois 13	John C. McKenzie	Republican	1910	Incumbent re-elected.	▌ ✓ John C. McKenzie (Republican) 57.89%; ▌Frank M. Goodwin (Democratic) 27.87%; ▌Isaac N. Evans (Progressive) 12.94%; ▌Clarence C. Brooks (Socialist) 1.31%
Illinois 14	Clyde H. Tavenner	Democratic	1912	Incumbent re-elected.	▌ ✓ Clyde H. Tavenner (Democratic) 44.06%; ▌Frank Abbey (Republican) 41.27%; ▌Henry E. Burgess (Progressive) 10.93%; ▌Edgar Owens (Socialist) 3.75%
Illinois 15	Stephen A. Hoxworth	Democratic	1912	Incumbent retired. Republican gain.	▌ ✓ Edward John King (Republican) 41.26%; ▌Edward P. Allen (Democratic) 36.99%; ▌Julius Kespohl (Progressive) 18.12%; ▌C. C. Haxel (Socialist) 3.63%
Illinois 16	Claude U. Stone	Democratic	1910	Incumbent re-elected.	▌ ✓ Claude U. Stone (Democratic) 48.83%; ▌George A. Zeller (Republican) 43.69%; ▌Edwin M. Wayne (Progressive) 4.95%; ▌Louis Bierman (Socialist) 2.54%
Illinois 17	Louis FitzHenry	Democratic	1912	Incumbent lost re-election. Republican gain.	▌ ✓ John A. Sterling (Republican) 48.08%; ▌Louis FitzHenry (Democratic) 42.68%; ▌George E. Stump (Progressive) 7.93%; ▌Gordon W. Childers (Socialist) 1.32%
Illinois 18	Frank T. O'Hair	Democratic	1912	Incumbent lost re-election. Republican gain.	▌ ✓ Joseph G. Cannon (Republican) 47.14%; ▌Frank T. O'Hair (Democratic) 42.80%; ▌Wendell P. Kay (Progressive) 8.80%; ▌James P. Meyers (Socialist) 1.26%
Illinois 19	Charles M. Borchers	Democratic	1912	Incumbent lost re-election. Republican gain.	▌ ✓ William B. McKinley (Republican) 50.96%; ▌Charles M. Borchers (Democratic) 39.71%; ▌Frank B. Thomas (Progressive) 8.14%; Others: ▌Charles Peebles (Socialist) 1.18%; ▌Frank B. Vennum (Prohibition) 0.02%
Illinois 20	Henry T. Rainey	Democratic	1902	Incumbent re-elected.	▌ ✓ Henry T. Rainey (Democratic) 58.02%; ▌Jarvis F. Dubois (Republican) 36.75%; ▌B. O. Aylesworth (Progressive) 4.00%; ▌Frank Hoover (Socialist) 1.24%
Illinois 21	James M. Graham	Democratic	1908	Incumbent lost re-election. Republican gain.	▌ ✓ Loren E. Wheeler (Republican) 58.02%; ▌James M. Graham (Democratic) 36.75%; ▌Porter Paddock (Progressive) 5.56%; ▌William Koenikramer (Socialist) 4.36%
Illinois 22	William N. Baltz	Democratic	1912	Incumbent lost re-election. Republican gain.	▌ ✓ William A. Rodenberg (Republican) 46.45%; ▌William N. Baltz (Democratic) 42.48%; ▌Charles F. Steizel (Progressive) 5.57%; ▌Marshall E. Kirkpatrick (Socialist) 5.51%; ▌John Besse (Independent) 0.00%
Illinois 23	Martin D. Foster	Democratic	1906	Incumbent re-elected.	▌ ✓ Martin D. Foster (Democratic) 53.14%; ▌John J. Bundy (Republican) 39.25%; ▌Logan B. Skipper (Progressive) 5.79%; ▌Everett Ely (Socialist) 1.82%
Illinois 24	H. Robert Fowler	Democratic	1910	Incumbent lost re-election. Republican gain.	▌ ✓ Thomas S. Williams (Republican) 49.91%; ▌H. Robert Fowler (Democratic) 47.34%; ▌A. J. Gibbons (Progressive) 2.71%; Others: ▌Noah C. Bainum (Socialist) 0.03%; ▌S. J. C. Hess (Independent) 0.00%
Illinois 25	Robert P. Hill	Democratic	1912	Incumbent lost re-election. Republican gain.	▌ ✓ Edward E. Denison (Republican) 48.45%; ▌Robert P. Hill (Democratic) 42.84%; ▌George W. Dowell (Progressive) 5.90%; ▌Paul H. Castle (Socialist) 2.81%; ▌Harvey A. DuBois (Independent) 0.00%
Illinois at-large 2 seats on a general ticket	Lawrence B. Stringer	Democratic	1912	Incumbent retired to run for U.S. Senator. Republican gain.	▌ ✓ Burnett M. Chiperfield (Republican) 21.43%; ▌ ✓ William E. Williams (Democratic) 20.69%; ▌J. McCan Davis (Republican) 20.59%; ▌Thomas P. Sullivan (Democratic) 19.65%; ▌Harry L. Heer (Progressive) 6.25%; ▌George N. Kreider (Progressive) 5.79%; ▌Dan L. Thomas (Socialist) 2.36%
Illinois at-large 2 seats on a general ticket	William E. Williams	Democratic	1912	Incumbent re-elected.	▌ ✓ Burnett M. Chiperfield (Republican) 21.43%; ▌ ✓ William E. Williams (Democratic) 20.69%; ▌J. McCan Davis (Republican) 20.59%; ▌Thomas P. Sullivan (Democratic) 19.65%; ▌Harry L. Heer (Progressive) 6.25%; ▌George N. Kreider (Progressive) 5.79%; ▌Dan L. Thomas (Socialist) 2.36%

== Indiana ==
District	Incumbent			This race	
District	Member	Party	First elected	Results	Candidates
Indiana 1	Charles Lieb	Democratic	1912	Incumbent re-elected.	▌ ✓ Charles Lieb (Democratic) 46.56%; ▌S. Wallace Cook (Republican) 40.14%; ▌Ulrich H. Seider (Progressive) 8.00%; ▌William H. Rainey (Socialist) 3.68%; ▌Amos Legier (Prohibition) 1.63%
Indiana 2	William A. Cullop	Democratic	1908	Incumbent re-elected.	▌ ✓ William A. Cullop (Democratic) 44.25%; ▌Oscar E. Bland (Republican) 39.49%; ▌James B. Wilson (Progressive) 10.49%; ▌William J. Trout (Socialist) 4.59%; ▌George Scruggs (Prohibition) 1.17%
Indiana 3	William E. Cox	Democratic	1906	Incumbent re-elected.	▌ ✓ William E. Cox (Democratic) 56.35%; ▌Edgar D. Bush (Republican) 29.17%; ▌Lawson Mace (Progressive) 12.72%; Others: ▌Columbus H. Norblett (Prohibition) 0.98%; ▌Joseph Schrieber (Socialist) 0.79%
Indiana 4	Lincoln Dixon	Democratic	1904	Incumbent re-elected.	▌ ✓ Lincoln Dixon (Democratic) 50.26%; ▌Manley D. Wilson (Republican) 37.17%; ▌Roy W. Ewing (Progressive) 10.16%; Others: ▌Ben F. Gaston (Prohibition) 1.44%; ▌William Carmichael (Socialist) 0.98%
Indiana 5	Ralph Wilbur Moss	Democratic	1908	Incumbent re-elected.	▌ ✓ Ralph Wilbur Moss (Democratic) 45.91%; ▌Ray Shattuck (Republican) 36.99%; ▌Otis E. Gulley (Progressive) 11.07%; ▌James O'Neil (Socialist) 4.18%; ▌Ernest G. Shoupe (Prohibition) 1.85%
Indiana 6	Finly H. Gray	Democratic	1910	Incumbent re-elected.	▌ ✓ Finly H. Gray (Democratic) 41.43%; ▌Patrick J. Lynch (Republican) 33.55%; ▌Elbert Russell (Progressive) 21.31%; Others: ▌Evert E. Worth (Prohibition) 1.94%; ▌R. Foster Van Voorhis (Socialist) 1.78%
Indiana 7	Charles A. Korbly	Democratic	1908	Incumbent lost re-election. Republican gain.	▌ ✓ Merrill Moores (Republican) 41.99%; ▌Charles A. Korbly (Democratic) 33.89%; ▌Paxton Hibben (Progressive) 16.72%; ▌William Henry (Socialist) 6.35%; ▌Edward W. Clark (Prohibition) 1.05%
Indiana 8	John A. M. Adair	Democratic	1906	Incumbent re-elected.	▌ ✓ John A. M. Adair (Democratic) 44.45%; ▌Albert H. Vestal (Republican) 26.79%; ▌Harry L. Kitselman (Progressive) 21.95%; ▌Max Mathews (Socialist) 3.98%; ▌Jacob Walter Gibson (Prohibition) 2.83%
Indiana 9	Martin A. Morrison	Democratic	1908	Incumbent re-elected.	▌ ✓ Martin A. Morrison (Democratic) 42.75%; ▌Fred S. Purnell (Republican) 40.89%; ▌Charles A. Ford (Progressive) 12.05%; ▌Albert W. Jackman (Prohibition) 2.51%; ▌Ocie S. Rash (Socialist) 1.80%
Indiana 10	John B. Peterson	Democratic	1912	Incumbent lost re-election. Republican gain.	▌ ✓ William R. Wood (Republican) 45.36%; ▌John B. Peterson (Democratic) 36.04%; ▌William H. Ade (Progressive) 17.55%; ▌Ernan A. Bush (Prohibition) 1.05%
Indiana 11	George W. Rauch	Democratic	1906	Incumbent re-elected.	▌ ✓ George W. Rauch (Democratic) 41.64%; ▌Sam L. Strickler (Republican) 34.25%; ▌Bernard B. Shively (Progressive) 16.33%; ▌Ernest Malott (Socialist) 4.48%; ▌Bert W. Ayres (Prohibition) 3.30%
Indiana 12	Cyrus Cline	Democratic	1908	Incumbent re-elected.	▌ ✓ Cyrus Cline (Democratic) 46.89%; ▌Charles R. Lane (Republican) 37.92%; ▌H. M. Widney (Progressive) 10.02%; ▌William Dibble (Socialist) 3.19%; ▌Jacob G. Wise (Prohibition) 1.99%
Indiana 13	Henry A. Barnhart	Democratic	1908 (special)	Incumbent re-elected.	▌ ✓ Henry A. Barnhart (Democratic) 44.39%; ▌Andrew J. Hickey (Republican) 34.92%; ▌R. Clarence Stephens (Progressive) 15.09%; ▌Earl E. Berry (Socialist) 3.26%; ▌Charles H. Tuesburg (Prohibition) 2.35%

== Iowa ==
District	Incumbent			This race	
District	Member	Party	First elected	Results	Candidates
Iowa 1	Charles A. Kennedy	Republican	1906	Incumbent re-elected.	▌ ✓ Charles A. Kennedy (Republican) 49.21%; ▌F. B. Whittaker (Democratic) 40.99%; ▌Daniel B. Heller (Progressive) 5.30%; Others: ▌Edward P. Hagerty (Socialist) 1.92%; ▌U. G. Miller (Prohibition) 1.48%; ▌Benson F. Jones (Independent) 1.10%
Iowa 2	Henry Vollmer	Democratic	1914 (special)	Incumbent retired. Republican gain.	▌ ✓ Harry E. Hull (Republican) 50.84%; ▌W. J. McDonald (Democratic) 42.75%; ▌Z. M. Holcombe (Socialist) 3.33%; ▌John W. Cooper (Progressive) 2.53%
Iowa 3	Maurice Connolly	Democratic	1912	Incumbent retired to run for U.S. Senator. Republican gain.	▌ ✓ Burton E. Sweet (Republican) 56.52%; ▌James C. Murtagh (Democratic) 38.95%; ▌Robert J. Belt (Progressive) 2.07%; Others: ▌D. S. Cameron (Socialist) 1.46%; ▌C. C. Covert (Prohibition) 1.00%
Iowa 4	Gilbert N. Haugen	Republican	1898	Incumbent re-elected.	▌ ✓ Gilbert N. Haugen (Republican) 56.55%; ▌G. A. Meyer (Democratic) 38.60%; ▌Arthur A. A. Kugler (Prohibition) 2.80%; Others: ▌Edward G. Gashel (Socialist) 1.21%; ▌W. W. Williams (Progressive) 0.83%
Iowa 5	James W. Good	Republican	1908	Incumbent re-elected.	▌ ✓ James W. Good (Republican) 56.15%; ▌Joseph Mekota (Democratic) 39.23%; Others: ▌Lindley M. Osborne (Progressive) 1.86%; ▌Myron F. Wiltse (Socialist) 1.52%; ▌S. B. Miller (Prohibition) 1.25%
Iowa 6	Sanford Kirkpatrick	Democratic	1912	Incumbent lost renomination. Republican gain.	▌ ✓ C. William Ramseyer (Republican) 48.11%; ▌W. H. Hamilton (Democratic) 42.14%; ▌H. W. Rayner (Progressive) 4.26%; ▌A. J. Waddell (Socialist) 3.87%; ▌J. J. Mullin (Prohibition) 1.62%
Iowa 7	Charles E. Patton	Republican	1910	Incumbent retired. Republican hold.	▌ ✓ Cassius C. Dowell (Republican) 53.77%; ▌John T. Mulvaney (Democratic) 33.94%; ▌John E. Holmes (Progressive) 6.85%; ▌Charles S. Gay (Socialist) 2.93%; ▌C. H. Gordon (Prohibition) 2.52%
Iowa 8	Horace M. Towner	Republican	1910	Incumbent re-elected.	▌ ✓ Horace M. Towner (Republican) 54.07%; ▌H. E. Valentine (Democratic) 39.08%; ▌Jerome Smith (Progressive) 3.41%; Others: ▌S. D. Mercer (Socialist) 1.75%; ▌William Orr (Prohibition) 1.69%
Iowa 9	William R. Green	Republican	1911 (special)	Incumbent re-elected.	▌ ✓ William R. Green (Republican) 53.94%; ▌H. S. Mosher (Democratic) 41.09%; ▌Albert B. Adams (Progressive) 3.40%; ▌A. F. Christie (Socialist) 1.58%
Iowa 10	Frank P. Woods	Republican	1908	Incumbent re-elected.	▌ ✓ Frank P. Woods (Republican) 54.51%; ▌D. M. Kelleher (Democratic) 32.45%; ▌William B. Quarton (Progressive) 10.49%; Others: ▌C. F. Polson (Socialist) 1.52%; ▌N. C. Brun (Prohibition) 1.03%
Iowa 11	George Cromwell Scott	Republican	1912	Incumbent lost re-election. Democratic gain.	▌ ✓ Thomas J. Steele (Democratic) 48.88%; ▌George Cromwell Scott (Republican) 40.47%; ▌Edward H. Crane (Progressive) 8.56%; Others: ▌Charles R. Metcalf (Socialist) 1.29%; ▌Alex Hartley (Prohibition) 0.80%

== Kansas ==
District	Incumbent			This race	
District	Member	Party	First elected	Results	Candidates
Kansas 1	Daniel R. Anthony Jr.	Republican	1907 (special)	Incumbent re-elected.	▌ ✓ Daniel R. Anthony Jr. (Republican) 51.64%; ▌J. B. Chapman (Democratic) 33.20%; ▌Sheffield Ingalls (Progressive) 15.16%
Kansas 2	Joseph Taggart	Democratic	1911 (special)	Incumbent re-elected.	▌ ✓ Joseph Taggart (Democratic) 41.70%; ▌John N. Crider (Republican) 36.30%; ▌J. L. Brady (Progressive) 18.01%; ▌Sena H. Wallace (Prohibition) 3.99%
Kansas 3	Philip P. Campbell	Republican	1902	Incumbent re-elected.	▌ ✓ Philip P. Campbell (Republican) 41.19%; ▌P. J. McGinley (Democratic) 28.89%; ▌L. F. Fuller (Socialist) 15.28%; ▌G. E. Bertch (Progressive) 10.58%; ▌Emma W. Grover (Prohibition) 4.06%
Kansas 4	Dudley Doolittle	Democratic	1912	Incumbent re-elected.	▌ ✓ Dudley Doolittle (Democratic) 47.02%; ▌Howard F. Martindale (Republican) 38.04%; ▌N. D. Welty (Progressive) 13.04%; ▌E. B. Greene (Prohibition) 1.91%
Kansas 5	Guy T. Helvering	Democratic	1912	Incumbent re-elected.	▌ ✓ Guy T. Helvering (Democratic) 45.73%; ▌William A. Calderhead (Republican) 41.39%; ▌Loring M. Trott (Progressive) 12.88%
Kansas 6	John R. Connelly	Democratic	1912	Incumbent re-elected.	▌ ✓ John R. Connelly (Democratic) 47.02%; ▌John B. Dykes (Republican) 36.70%; ▌Eva M. Murphy (Progressive) 11.77%; ▌John S. Lovelace (Socialist) 4.52%
Kansas 7	George A. Neeley	Democratic	1912 (special)	Incumbent retired to run for U.S. Senator. Democratic hold.	▌ ✓ Jouett Shouse (Democratic) 39.71%; ▌John S. Simmons (Republican) 37.48%; ▌O. W. Dawson (Progressive) 17.95%; ▌Harry R. Ross (Prohibition) 4.86%
Kansas 8	Victor Murdock	Republican	1902	Incumbent retired to run for U.S. Senator. Democratic gain.	▌ ✓ William A. Ayres (Democratic) 46.58%; ▌Charles L. Davidson (Progressive) 25.78%; ▌Ezra Branine (Republican) 24.94%; ▌H. J. Harnly (Prohibition) 2.70%

== Kentucky ==
District	Incumbent			This race	
District	Member	Party	First elected	Results	Candidates
Kentucky 1	Alben W. Barkley	Democratic	1912	Incumbent re-elected.	▌ ✓ Alben W. Barkley (Democratic) 65.90%; ▌Edwin Farley (Republican) 30.51%; ▌I. A. Wasson (Socialist) 2.46%; ▌Max M. Hanberry (Progressive) 1.13%
Kentucky 2	Augustus O. Stanley	Democratic	1902	Incumbent retired to run for U.S. Senator. Democratic hold.	▌ ✓ David H. Kincheloe (Democratic) 56.99%; ▌Alvin H. Clark (Republican) 40.19%; Others: ▌J. S. Cullen (Socialist) 1.50%; ▌N. B. Chambers (Progressive) 1.32%
Kentucky 3	Robert Y. Thomas Jr.	Democratic	1908	Incumbent re-elected.	▌ ✓ Robert Y. Thomas Jr. (Democratic) 49.65%; ▌J. Frank Taylor (Republican) 44.67%; ▌Newton Belcher (Progressive) 2.92%; ▌Milton Clarke (Socialist) 2.77%
Kentucky 4	Ben Johnson	Democratic	1906	Incumbent re-elected.	▌ ✓ Ben Johnson (Democratic) 56.94%; ▌W. Sherman Ball (Republican) 38.02%; ▌D. C. Jones (Progressive) 3.71%; ▌W. H. Cundiff (Socialist) 1.34%
Kentucky 5	J. Swagar Sherley	Democratic	1902	Incumbent re-elected.	▌ ✓ J. Swagar Sherley (Democratic) 61.40%; ▌Charles T. Gardiner (Progressive) 20.94%; ▌Roy Wilhoit (Republican) 17.08%; Others: ▌R. T. Mathews (Prohibition) 0.39%; ▌John H. Arnold (Socialist Labor) 0.18%
Kentucky 6	Arthur B. Rouse	Democratic	1910	Incumbent re-elected.	▌ ✓ Arthur B. Rouse (Democratic) 87.92%; ▌Emmett Orr (Progressive) 8.24%; ▌Frank H. Streine (Socialist) 3.84%
Kentucky 7	J. Campbell Cantrill	Democratic	1908	Incumbent re-elected.	▌ ✓ J. Campbell Cantrill (Democratic) 61.17%; ▌Louis L. Bristow (Republican) 37.53%; ▌Lucien Beckner (Progressive) 1.30%
Kentucky 8	Harvey Helm	Democratic	1906	Incumbent re-elected.	▌ ✓ Harvey Helm (Democratic) 55.03%; ▌James P. Spilman (Republican) 39.99%; ▌J. F. Holzclaw (Progressive) 4.98%
Kentucky 9	William J. Fields	Democratic	1910	Incumbent re-elected.	▌ ✓ William J. Fields (Democratic) 53.03%; ▌H. Glenn Ireland (Republican) 44.99%; Others: ▌Oliver D. Cole (Progressive) 1.08%; ▌William Kern (Socialist) 0.91%
Kentucky 10	John W. Langley	Republican	1906	Incumbent re-elected.	▌ ✓ John W. Langley (Republican) 61.50%; ▌F. Tom Hatcher (Democratic) 36.27%; Others: ▌H. M. Hoskins (Progressive) 1.44%; ▌S. S. Morrison (Socialist) 0.80%
Kentucky 11	Caleb Powers	Republican	1910	Incumbent re-elected.	▌ ✓ Caleb Powers (Republican) 70.77%; ▌John H. Wilson (Independent) 29.23%

== Louisiana ==
District	Incumbent			This race	
District	Member	Party	First elected	Results	Candidates
Louisiana 1	Albert Estopinal	Democratic	1908	Incumbent re-elected.	▌ ✓ Albert Estopinal (Democratic) 91.41%; ▌Louis H. Burns (Progressive) 8.59%
Louisiana 2	H. Garland Dupré	Democratic	1910	Incumbent re-elected.	▌ ✓ H. Garland Dupré (Democratic) 81.67%; ▌Louis Lebourgeois (Progressive) 18.33%
Louisiana 3	Robert F. Broussard	Democratic	1896	Incumbent retired to run for U.S. Senator. Progressive gain.	▌ ✓ Whitmell P. Martin (Progressive) 56.71%; ▌Henri Gueydan (Democratic) 43.30%
Louisiana 4	John T. Watkins	Democratic	1904	Incumbent re-elected.	▌ ✓ John T. Watkins (Democratic) 100%
Louisiana 5	James Walter Elder	Democratic	1912	Incumbent lost renomination. Democratic hold.	▌ ✓ Riley J. Wilson (Democratic) 95.18%; ▌N. E. Chatham (Independent) 4.82%
Louisiana 6	Lewis L. Morgan	Democratic	1912	Incumbent re-elected.	▌ ✓ Lewis L. Morgan (Democratic) 100%
Louisiana 7	Ladislas Lazaro	Democratic	1912	Incumbent re-elected	▌ ✓ Ladislas Lazaro (Democratic) 86.05%; ▌Walter F. Dietz (Republican) 13.96%
Louisiana 8	James B. Aswell	Democratic	1912	Incumbent re-elected	▌ ✓ James B. Aswell (Democratic) 85.97%; ▌J. R. Jones (Socialist) 14.03%

== Maine ==
District	Incumbent			This race	
District	Member	Party	First elected	Results	Candidates
Maine 1	Asher Hinds	Republican	1910	Incumbent re-elected.	▌ ✓ Asher Hinds (Republican) 47.04%; ▌John C. Seates (Democratic) 45.37%; ▌Walter C. Emerson (Progressive) 6.44%; ▌Henry W. Pinkham (Socialist) 1.15%
Maine 2	Daniel J. McGillicuddy	Democratic	1892	Incumbent re-elected.	▌ ✓ Daniel J. McGillicuddy (Democratic) 46.91%; ▌Harold M. Sewall (Republican) 32.21%; ▌Alton C. Wheeler (Progressive) 18.58%; Others: ▌George P. Larabee (Socialist) 1.92%; ▌Edward B. Small (Prohibition) 0.38%
Maine 3	John A. Peters	Republican	1913	Incumbent re-elected.	▌ ✓ John A. Peters (Republican) 46.54%; ▌William R. Pattangall (Democratic) 42.94%; ▌E. Maynard Thompson (Progressive) 8.78%; ▌William E. Plummer (Socialist) 1.45%
Maine 4	Frank E. Guernsey	Republican	1908	Incumbent re-elected.	▌ ✓ Frank E. Guernsey (Republican) 45%; ▌Charles Mullen (Democratic) 35.49%; ▌E. Delmont Merrill (Progressive) 19.02%; ▌Donald William Ross (Socialist) 0.48%

== Maryland ==
District	Incumbent			This race	
District	Member	Party	First elected	Results	Candidates
Maryland 1	Vacant			J. Harry Covington (D) resigned September 30, 1914, to become Chief Justice of the D.C. Supreme Court. Democratic hold.	▌ ✓ Jesse Price (Democratic) 49.0%; ▌Robert F. Duer (Republican) 47.9%; ▌Charles M. Elderdice (Prohibition) 3.0%
Maryland 2	J. Frederick C. Talbott	Democratic	1902	Incumbent re-elected.	▌ ✓ J. Frederick C. Talbott (Democratic) 53.5%; ▌William J. Heaps (Republican) 41.5%; ▌Emory C. Ebaugh (Prohibition) 2.0%; Others: ▌Otho N. Johnson (Progressive) 1.9%; ▌Thomas B. Farmer (Socialist) 0.7%; ▌Charles Becker (Labor) 0.4%
Maryland 3	Charles Pearce Coady	Democratic	1913 (special)	Incumbent re-elected.	▌ ✓ Charles Pearce Coady (Democratic) 51.9%; ▌John A. Janetzke (Republican) 41.1%; ▌Jacob M. Levy (Socialist) 2.0%; ▌Harry S. Johnson (Prohibition) 2.0%; Others: ▌John T. Avery (Progressive) 1.8%; ▌Israel Merwitz (Labor) 0.3%
Maryland 4	J. Charles Linthicum	Democratic	1910	Incumbent re-elected.	▌ ✓ J. Charles Linthicum (Democratic) 58.2%; ▌Thomas T. Hammond (Republican) 37.0%; ▌H. Ferdinand Wiegand (Progressive) 2.1%; Others: ▌William Magee (Prohibition) 1.2%; ▌Clarence H. Taylor (Socialist) 1.9%; ▌Frank N. H. Lang (Labor) 0.4%
Maryland 5	Frank Owens Smith	Democratic	1912	Incumbent lost renomination. New member elected. Republican gain.	▌ ✓ Sydney Emanuel Mudd II (Republican) 48.6%; ▌Richard A. Johnson (Democratic) 45.5%; ▌Joseph A. Wilmer (Progressive) 2.2%; Others: ▌John P. Burdette (Prohibition) 1.4%; ▌William Kade (Socialist) 1.2%; ▌Nathan Klienman (Labor) 1.0%
Maryland 6	David John Lewis	Democratic	1910	Incumbent re-elected.	▌ ✓ David John Lewis (Democratic) 49.1%; ▌Frederick Zihlman (Republican) 47.2%; Others: ▌H. Clifford Wright (Socialist) 1.8%; ▌William L. Purdum (Prohibition) 1.0%; ▌Lewis F. Kefauver (Progressive) 0.9%

== Massachusetts ==
District	Incumbent			This race	
District	Member	Party	First elected	Results	Candidates
Massachusetts 1	Allen T. Treadway	Republican	1912	Incumbent re-elected.	▌ ✓ Allen T. Treadway (Republican) 55.0%; ▌Morton H. Burdick (Democratic) 37.8%; ▌Walter S. Hutchins (Socialist) 4.0%; ▌George D. Pettee (Progressive) 3.2%
Massachusetts 2	Frederick H. Gillett	Republican	1892	Incumbent re-elected.	▌ ✓ Frederick H. Gillett (Republican) 56.3%; ▌Edward M. Lewis (Progressive) 40.5%; ▌Thomas F. Loorem (Socialist) 3.2%
Massachusetts 3	Calvin Paige	Republican	1913 (special)	Incumbent re-elected.	▌ ✓ Calvin Paige (Republican) 56.0%; ▌Owen A. Hoban (Democratic) 37.2%; ▌Jonas Bemis (Progressive) 6.8%
Massachusetts 4	Samuel Winslow	Republican	1912	Incumbent re-elected.	▌ ✓ Samuel Winslow (Republican) 57.8%; ▌Hugh O'Rourke (Democratic) 42.2%
Massachusetts 5	Butler Ames	Republican	1912	Incumbent re-elected.	▌ ✓ John Jacob Rogers (Republican) 62.1%; ▌J. Joseph O'Connor (Democratic) 32.9%; ▌William N. Osgood (Progressive) 5.0%
Massachusetts 6	Augustus P. Gardner	Republican	1902 (special)	Incumbent re-elected.	▌ ✓ Augustus P. Gardner (Republican) 69.2%; ▌George A. Schofield (Democratic) 26.7%; ▌Joseph A. Wallis II (Socialist) 4.1%
Massachusetts 7	Michael F. Phelan	Democratic	1912	Incumbent re-elected.	▌ ✓ Michael F. Phelan (Democratic) 50.4%; ▌Charles Cabot Johnson (Republican) 41.6%; ▌Lynn M. Ranger (Progressive) 4.5%; ▌William R. Henry (Socialist) 3.5%
Massachusetts 8	Frederick S. Deitrick	Democratic	1912	Incumbent re-elected.	▌ ✓ Frederick W. Dallinger (Republican) 49.7%; ▌Frederick S. Deitrick (Democratic) 46.9%; ▌Henry C. Long (Progressive) 3.4%
Massachusetts 9	Ernest W. Roberts	Republican	1898	Incumbent re-elected.	▌ ✓ Ernest W. Roberts (Republican) 54.8%; ▌Peter W. Collins (Democratic) 33.3%; ▌H. Huestis Newton (Progressive) 11.9%
Massachusetts 10	Vacant			William F. Murry (D) resigned September 28, 1914, to become Postmaster of Boston. Democratic hold.	▌ ✓ Peter Francis Tague (Democratic) 73.7%; ▌James A. Cochran (Republican) 17.9%; ▌Daniel T. Callahan (Progressive) 8.4%
Massachusetts 11	Vacant			Andrew J. Peters (D) resigned August 15, 1914, to become U.S. Assistant Secretary of the Treasury. Republican gain.	▌ ✓ George H. Tinkham (Republican) 49.8%; ▌Francis J. Horgan (Democratic) 43.7%; ▌Henry Clay Peters (Progressive) 6.5%
Massachusetts 12	James A. Gallivan	Democratic	1914 (special)	Incumbent re-elected.	▌ ✓ James A. Gallivan (Democratic) 66.2%; ▌Charles H. Robinson 27.7%; ▌Chester R. Lawrence (Progressive) 6.1%
Massachusetts 13	John Joseph Mitchell	Democratic	1913 (special)	Incumbent lost re-election. Republican gain.	▌ ✓ William H. Carter (Republican) 50.5%; ▌John Joseph Mitchell (Democratic) 44.7%; ▌John Fogg Twombly (Progressive) 4.8%
Massachusetts 14	Edward Gilmore	Democratic	1912	Incumbent retired. Democratic hold.	▌ ✓ Richard Olney II (Democratic) 36.5%; ▌Harry C. Howard (Republican) 34.6%; ▌Henry L. Kincaide (Progressive) 25.2%; ▌John McCarty (Socialist) 3.7%
Massachusetts 15	William S. Greene	Republican	1898 (special)	Incumbent re-elected.	▌ ✓ William S. Greene (Republican) 57.9%; ▌James F. Morris (Democratic) 34.1%; ▌Alvin G. Weeks (Progressive) 8.0%
Massachusetts 16	Thomas Chandler Thacher	Democratic	1912	Incumbent lost re-election. Republican gain.	▌ ✓ Joseph Walsh (Republican) 46.9%; ▌Thomas Chandler Thacher (Democratic) 42.0%; ▌Thomas Thompson (Progressive) 11.1%

== Michigan ==
District	Incumbent			This race	
District	Member	Party	First elected	Results	Candidates
Michigan 1	Frank E. Doremus	Democratic	1910	Incumbent re-elected.	▌ ✓ Frank E. Doremus (Democratic) 62.53%; ▌Charles E. McCarty (Republican) 30.89%; ▌Gustavus D. Pope (Progressive) 3.36%; ▌Charles Erb (Socialist) 2.75%; Others: ▌William A. Brubaker (Prohibition) 0.34%; ▌Mike Andzelewski (Socialist Labor) 0.14%
Michigan 2	Samuel Beakes	Democratic	1912	Incumbent re-elected.	▌ ✓ Samuel Beakes (Democratic) 45.21%; ▌Mark R. Bacon (Republican) 44.68%; ▌Hubert F. Probert (Progressive) 8.36%; Others: ▌J. E. Frost (Socialist) 0.89%; ▌Charles W. Obee (Prohibition) 0.77%; ▌Mike Andzelewski (Socialist Labor) 0.09%
Michigan 3	John M. C. Smith	Republican	1910	Incumbent re-elected.	▌ ✓ John M. C. Smith (Republican) 45.62%; ▌Orville J. Cornell (Democratic) 38.63%; ▌Edward N. Dingley (Progressive) 11.22%; ▌George Hess (Socialist) 2.94%; ▌Leroy H. White (Prohibition) 1.6%
Michigan 4	Edward L. Hamilton	Republican	1896	Incumbent re-elected.	▌ ✓ Edward L. Hamilton (Republican) 53.19%; ▌Albert E. Beebe (Democratic) 38.52%; ▌J. Mark Harvey (Progressive) 5.23%; ▌Ralph S. Ireland (Socialist) 2.06%; ▌Henry A. Feathers (Prohibition) 1.01%
Michigan 5	Carl E. Mapes	Republican	1912	Incumbent re-elected.	▌ ✓ Carl E. Mapes (Republican) 58.7%; ▌Thaddeus B. Taylor (Democratic) 30.78%; ▌Alvin E. Ewing (Progressive) 6.21%; ▌Benjamin H. Harris (Socialist) 3.12%; ▌David Q. Barry (Prohibition) 1.2%
Michigan 6	Samuel W. Smith	Republican	1896	Incumbent retired. Republican hold.	▌ ✓ Patrick H. Kelley (Republican) 49.33%; ▌Frank L. Dodge (Democratic) 38.66%; ▌William S. Kellogg (Progressive) 9.52%; ▌Seymour A. Ayres (Socialist) 2.43%; ▌Mike Andzelewski (Socialist Labor) 0.06%
Michigan 7	Louis C. Cramton	Republican	1912	Incumbent re-elected.	▌ ✓ Louis C. Cramton (Republican) 59.99%; ▌John F. Murphy (Democratic) 28.05%; ▌Jefferson G. Brown (Progressive) 9.88%; Others: ▌Nelson H. Miller (Prohibition) 1.21%; ▌Alfred Pagett (Socialist) 0.88%
Michigan 8	Joseph W. Fordney	Republican	1898	Incumbent re-elected.	▌ ✓ Joseph W. Fordney (Republican) 52.68%; ▌Laurence W. Smith (Democratic) 40.92%; ▌George Dailey (Progressive) 3.28%; ▌George L. Seiferlein (Socialist) 2.03%; ▌Jefferson D. Leland (Prohibition) 1.1%
Michigan 9	James C. McLaughlin	Republican	1906	Incumbent re-elected.	▌ ✓ James C. McLaughlin (Republican) 55.32%; ▌Amos O. White (Democratic) 22.62%; ▌William H. Sears (Progressive) 16.83%; ▌Charles Crabtree (Socialist) 3.8%; ▌Frederick B. Waters (Prohibition) 1.43%
Michigan 10	Roy O. Woodruff	Progressive	1912	Incumbent lost re-election. Republican gain.	▌ ✓ George A. Loud (Republican) 45.45%; ▌Roy O. Woodruff (Progressive) 26.79%; ▌Charles W. Hitchcock (Democratic) 24.81%; ▌Henry A. Amahern (Socialist) 2.08%; ▌Joseph Leighton (Prohibition) 0.87%
Michigan 11	Francis O. Lindquist	Republican	1912	Incumbent retired. Republican hold.	▌ ✓ Frank D. Scott (Republican) 55.53%; ▌Francis T. McDonald (Democratic) 30.29%; ▌Herbert F. Baker (Progressive) 9.86%; ▌Rudolph R. Miller (Socialist) 3.46%; ▌Frank H. Taylor (Prohibition) 0.87%
Michigan 12	William J. MacDonald	Progressive	1912	Incumbent lost re-election. Republican gain.	▌ ✓ W. Frank James (Republican) 49.27%; ▌William J. MacDonald (Progressive) 31.14%; ▌Frederic J. Bawden (Democratic) 16.79%; ▌Andrew E. Anderson (Socialist) 2.81%
Michigan 13	Patrick H. Kelley; Redistricted from the at-large district	Republican	1912	Incumbent ran in the 6th district. Republican hold.	▌ ✓ Charles A. Nichols (Republican) 62.55%; ▌Antonio Entenza (Democratic) 27.15%; ▌Ralph H. Ferris (Progressive) 7.32%; ▌William G. Witt (Democratic) 2.22%; Others: ▌Frank E. Titus (Prohibition) 0.59%; ▌Mike Andzelewski (Socialist Labor) 0.17%

== Minnesota ==
District	Incumbent			This race	
District	Member	Party	First elected	Results	Candidates
Minnesota 1	Sydney Anderson	Republican	1910	Incumbent re-elected.	▌ ✓ Sydney Anderson (Republican) 65.6%; ▌Horace H. Witherstine (Democratic) 34.4%
Minnesota 2	Winfield S. Hammond	Democratic	1906	Incumbent retired to run for Governor of Minnesota. Republican gain.	▌ ✓ Franklin Ellsworth (Republican) 55.3%; ▌Jean A. Flittie (Democratic) 31.5%; ▌Paul F. Dehnel (Progressive) 9.4%; ▌John R. Hollister (Socialist) 3.9%
Minnesota 3	Charles R. Davis	Republican	1902	Incumbent re-elected.	▌ ✓ Charles R. Davis (Republican) 57.4%; ▌Carlos Avery (Democratic) 37.4%; ▌John Q. Mackintosh (Progressive) 5.2%
Minnesota 4	Frederick Stevens	Republican	1896	Incumbent lost re-election. Democratic gain.	▌ ✓ Carl Van Dyke (Democratic) 55.2%; ▌Frederick Stevens (Republican) 35.9%; ▌William Mahoney (Socialist) 7.2%; ▌Charles E. Learned (Progressive) 1.7%
Minnesota 5	George R. Smith	Republican	1912	Incumbent re-elected.	▌ ✓ George R. Smith (Republican) 40.7%; ▌Thomas Van Lear (Socialist) 33.3%; ▌John H. Long (Democratic) 14.3%; ▌Fred M. Powers (Progressive) 11.7%
Minnesota 6	Charles A. Lindbergh	Republican	1906	Incumbent re-elected.	▌ ✓ Charles A. Lindbergh (Republican) 47.5%; ▌Julian A. DuBois (Democratic) 35.2%; ▌Otto M. Thomason (Socialist) 11.6%; ▌T. J. Sharkey (Progressive) 5.7%
Minnesota 7	Andrew Volstead	Republican	1902	Incumbent re-elected.	▌ ✓ Andrew Volstead (Republican) 100%
Minnesota 8	Clarence B. Miller	Republican	1908	Incumbent re-elected.	▌ ✓ Clarence B. Miller (Republican) 50.4%; ▌Andrew Nelson (Democratic) 31.6%; ▌William E. Towne (Socialist) 14.9%; ▌Obadiah H. Higbee (Progressive) 3.1%
Minnesota 9	Halvor Steenerson	Republican	1902	Incumbent re-elected.	▌ ✓ Halvor Steenerson (Republican) 76.4%; ▌Michael A. Brattland (Socialist) 23.6%
Minnesota 10	James Manahan; Redistricted from the at-large district	Republican	1912	Incumbent retired. Progressive gain.	▌ ✓ Thomas D. Schall (Progressive) 39.1%; ▌Lowell E. Jepson (Republican) 34.8%; ▌Harry S. Swenson (Democratic) 26.1%

== Mississippi ==
District	Incumbent			This race	
District	Member	Party	First elected	Results	Candidates
Mississippi 1	Ezekiel S. Candler Jr.	Democratic	1900	Incumbent re-elected.	▌ ✓ Ezekiel S. Candler Jr. (Democratic) 100%
Mississippi 2	Hubert D. Stephens	Democratic	1910	Incumbent re-elected.	▌ ✓ Hubert D. Stephens (Democratic) 100%
Mississippi 3	Benjamin G. Humphreys II	Democratic	1902	Incumbent re-elected.	▌ ✓ Benjamin G. Humphreys II (Democratic) 98.02%; ▌John McQuister (Unknown) 1.98%
Mississippi 4	Thomas U. Sisson	Democratic	1908	Incumbent re-elected.	▌ ✓ Thomas U. Sisson (Democratic) 95.61%; ▌H. A. Harbaugh (Unknown) 4.39%
Mississippi 5	Samuel A. Witherspoon	Democratic	1910	Incumbent re-elected.	▌ ✓ Samuel A. Witherspoon (Democratic) 92.81%; ▌C. W. Smith (Socialist) 7.19%<
Mississippi 6	Pat Harrison	Democratic	1910	Incumbent re-elected.	▌ ✓ Pat Harrison (Democratic) 95.48%; ▌Fred N. Scott (Socialist) 4.53%
Mississippi 7	Percy Quin	Democratic	1912	Incumbent re-elected.	▌ ✓ Percy Quin (Democratic) 100%
Mississippi 8	James Collier	Democratic	1908	Incumbent re-elected.	▌ ✓ James Collier (Democratic) 96.92%; ▌L. J. Raymond (Unknown) 3.08%

== Missouri ==
District	Incumbent			This race	
District	Member	Party	First elected	Results	Candidates
Missouri 1	James T. Lloyd	Democratic	1897	Incumbent re-elected.	▌ ✓ James T. Lloyd (Democratic) 56.21%; ▌Edward S. Brown (Republican) 38.40%; ▌T. S. Sublette (Progressive) 3.49%; ▌Abner Smith (Socialist) 1.89%
Missouri 2	William W. Rucker	Democratic	1898	Incumbent re-elected.	▌ ✓ William W. Rucker (Democratic) 98.67%; ▌William Isaacs (Socialist) 1.33%
Missouri 3	Joshua W. Alexander	Democratic	1906	Incumbent re-elected.	▌ ✓ Joshua W. Alexander (Democratic) 55.64%; ▌James H. Morroway (Republican) 36.74%; ▌W. J. Courtney (Progressive) 6.3%; Others: ▌Julius C. Hughes (Prohibition) 0.88%; ▌George Mock (Socialist) 0.44%
Missouri 4	Charles F. Booher	Democratic	1889	Incumbent re-elected.	▌ ✓ Charles F. Booher (Democratic) 53.53%; ▌Merrill E. Otis (Republican) 43.05%; ▌Nathaniel Sisson (Progressive) 2.34%; ▌Fred B. Moser (Socialist) 1.08%
Missouri 5	William P. Borland	Democratic	1908	Incumbent re-elected.	▌ ✓ William P. Borland (Democratic) 70.53%; ▌William B. Brown (Progressive) 17.76%; ▌Cameron L. Orr (Republican) 10.28%; ▌George C. Grant (Socialist) 1.43%
Missouri 6	Clement C. Dickinson	Democratic	1910	Incumbent re-elected.	▌ ✓ Clement C. Dickinson (Democratic) 56.35%; ▌A. J. Young (Republican) 34.66%; ▌G. A. Theilmann (Progressive) 7.28%; ▌Charles H. Harrison (Socialist) 1.71%
Missouri 7	Courtney W. Hamlin	Democratic	1902	Incumbent re-elected.	▌ ✓ Courtney W. Hamlin (Democratic) 51.97%; ▌A. B. Lovan (Republican) 42.67%; ▌Clark W. Robbins (Progressive) 3.40%; ▌Ernest T. Behrens (Socialist) 1.96%
Missouri 8	Dorsey W. Shackleford	Democratic	1899	Incumbent re-elected.	▌ ✓ Dorsey W. Shackleford (Democratic) 52.22%; ▌North Todd Gentry (Republican) 46.75%; ▌William H. Hertel (Socialist) 1.03%
Missouri 9	Champ Clark	Democratic	1892	Incumbent re-elected.	▌ ✓ Champ Clark (Democratic) 55.78%; ▌J. C. Brown (Republican) 40.97%; ▌Frederick C. Meier (Progressive) 2.49%; Others: ▌Charles Lemon (Socialist) 0.68%; ▌Leopold Kolkmeier (Socialist Labor) 0.07%
Missouri 10	Richard Bartholdt	Republican	1892	Incumbent retired. Republican hold.	▌ ✓ Jacob E. Meeker (Republican) 54.22%; ▌Francis M. Curlee (Democratic) 36.40%; ▌William M. Brandt (Socialist) 6.23%; ▌Eugene A. Vogt (Progressive) 2.72%; ▌William Wesley Cox (Socialist Labor) 0.43%
Missouri 11	William L. Igoe	Democratic	1912	Incumbent re-elected.	▌ ✓ William L. Igoe (Democratic) 52.55%; ▌Henry Hamilton (Republican) 46.4%; Others: ▌John F. Clark (Progressive) 0.82%; ▌Frederick Spalti (Socialist Labor) 0.23%
Missouri 12	Michael J. Gill	Democratic	1898	Incumbent lost renomination. Republican gain.	▌ ✓ Leonidas C. Dyer (Republican) 53.18%; ▌John R. Collins (Democratic) 43.12%; ▌John P. Hermann (Socialist) 2.87%; ▌Marion M. Mugan (Progressive) 0.83%
Missouri 13	Walter L. Hensley	Democratic	1910	Incumbent re-elected.	▌ ✓ Walter L. Hensley (Democratic) 50.17%; ▌John H. Reppy (Republican) 47.1%; ▌J. M. Spiler (Socialist) 2.6%; ▌Joseph Scheidler (Socialist Labor) 0.13%
Missouri 14	Joseph J. Russell	Democratic	1904	Incumbent re-elected.	▌ ✓ Joseph J. Russell (Democratic) 46.99%; ▌Thomas J. Brown (Republican) 44.84%; ▌Carl Knecht (Socialist) 6.35%; ▌William C. Brewer (Progressive) 1.82%
Missouri 15	Perl D. Decker	Democratic	1912	Incumbent re-elected.	▌ ✓ Perl D. Decker (Democratic) 48.08%; ▌Joe J. Manlove (Republican) 44.79%; ▌James DeWitt Carpenter (Socialist) 4.14%; Others: ▌Arch L. Simon (Progressive) 1.96%; ▌William H. Dalton (Prohibition) 0.77%; ▌Arthur E. Holbrook (Socialist Labor) 0.26%
Missouri 16	Thomas L. Rubey	Democratic	1910	Incumbent re-elected.	▌ ✓ Thomas L. Rubey (Democratic) 53.03%; ▌William I. Diffenderffer (Republican) 42.38%; ▌Columbus Bradford (Progressive) 2.39%; ▌Henry M. Fouty (Socialist) 2.21%

== Montana ==
District	Incumbent			This race	
District	Member	Party	First elected	Results	Candidates
Montana at-large 2 seats on a general ticket	John M. Evans	Democratic	1912	Incumbent re-elected.	▌ ✓ John M. Evans (Democratic) 23.29%; ▌ ✓ Tom Stout (Democratic) 22.13%; ▌Washington J. McCormick (Republican) 16.46%; ▌Fletcher Maddox (Republican) 16.39%; ▌Lewis J. Duncan (Socialist) 7.73%; ▌W. E. Kent (Socialist) 5.93%; ▌Wellington D. Rankin (Progressive) 4.19%; ▌James M. Brinson (Progressive) 3.88%
Montana at-large 2 seats on a general ticket	Tom Stout	Democratic	1912	Incumbent re-elected.	▌ ✓ John M. Evans (Democratic) 23.29%; ▌ ✓ Tom Stout (Democratic) 22.13%; ▌Washington J. McCormick (Republican) 16.46%; ▌Fletcher Maddox (Republican) 16.39%; ▌Lewis J. Duncan (Socialist) 7.73%; ▌W. E. Kent (Socialist) 5.93%; ▌Wellington D. Rankin (Progressive) 4.19%; ▌James M. Brinson (Progressive) 3.88%

== Nebraska ==
Nebraska results

District	Incumbent			This race	
District	Member	Party	First elected	Results	Candidates
Nebraska 1	John A. Maguire	Democratic	1908	Incumbent lost re-election. Republican gain.	▌ ✓ C. Frank Reavis (Republican) 48.13%; ▌John A. Maguire (Democratic) 47.12%; ▌Victor G. Lyford (Progressive) 4.75%
Nebraska 2	Charles O. Lobeck	Democratic	1910	Incumbent re-elected.	▌ ✓ Charles O. Lobeck (Democratic) 58.09%; ▌Thomas W. Blackburn (Republican) 31.10%; ▌Nathan Marnam (Progressive) 5.60%; ▌Fred J. Warren (Socialist) 4.48%; ▌C. C. Crowell (Prohibition) 0.73%
Nebraska 3	Dan V. Stephens	Democratic	1911 (special)	Incumbent re-elected.	▌ ✓ Dan V. Stephens (Democratic) 57.72%; ▌Ora S. Spillman (Republican) 39.24%; Others: ▌James M. Woodcock (Socialist) 1.67%; ▌George C. Fitch (Prohibition) 1.37%
Nebraska 4	Charles H. Sloan	Republican	1910	Incumbent re-elected.	▌ ✓ Charles H. Sloan (Republican) 54.78%; ▌Walter H. Rhodes (Democratic) 43.39%; ▌B. L. Milliken (Socialist) 1.84%
Nebraska 5	Silas R. Barton	Republican	1912	Incumbent lost re-election. Democratic gain.	▌ ✓ Ashton C. Shallenberger (Democratic) 48.68%; ▌Silas R. Barton (Republican) 48.18%; ▌Charles M. Birmingham (Prohibition) 3.14%
Nebraska 6	Moses Kinkaid	Republican	1902	Incumbent re-elected.	▌ ✓ Moses Kinkaid (Republican) 57.10%; ▌Frank Taylor (Democratic) 37.80%; ▌C. S. Chase (Socialist) 4.33%; ▌Lucien Stebbins (Independent) 0.78%

== Nevada ==
District	Incumbent			This race	
District	Member	Party	First elected	Results	Candidates
Nevada at-large	Edwin E. Roberts	Republican	1910	Incumbent re-elected.	▌ ✓ Edwin E. Roberts (Republican) 41.97%; ▌Leonard B. Fowler (Democratic) 37.81%; ▌Martin J. Scanlan (Socialist) 20.22%

== New Hampshire ==
District	Incumbent			This race	
District	Member	Party	First elected	Results	Candidates
New Hampshire 1	Eugene E. Reed	Democratic	1912	Incumbent lost re-election. Republican gain.	▌ ✓ Cyrus A. Sulloway (Republican) 49.98%; ▌Eugene E. Reed (Democratic) 46.31%; ▌Frederick W. Shoutell (Progressive) 2.35%; ▌Wirt D. Mills (Socialist) 1.36%
New Hampshire 2	Raymond B. Stevens	Democratic	1912	Incumbent retired to run for U.S. Senator. Republican gain.	▌ ✓ Edward H. Wason (Republican) 54.76%; ▌Charles J. French (Democratic) 40.46%; ▌George A. Weaver (Progressive) 3.54%; ▌Napoleon Carriveau (Socialist) 1.24%

== New Jersey ==
District	Incumbent			This race	
District	Member	Party	First elected	Results	Candidates
New Jersey 1	William J. Browning	Republican	1912	Incumbent re-elected.	▌ ✓ William J. Browning (Republican) 58.46%; ▌Joseph E. Nowrey (Democratic) 32.14%; ▌Frederick Hartmeyer (Socialist) 3.56%; ▌Grafton E. Day (Prohibition) 3.13%; Others: ▌George H. Higgins (Roosevelt Progressive) 1.78%; ▌George D. Chenoweth (Progressive) 0.94%
New Jersey 2	J. Thompson Baker	Democratic	1912	Incumbent lost re-election. Republican gain.	▌ ✓ Isaac Bacharach (Republican) 54.27%; ▌J. Thompson Baker (Democratic) 36.31%; ▌William H. Bright (Progressive) 5.76%; Others: ▌James Chapman (Prohibition) 1.96%; ▌G. A. McKeon (Socialist) 1.7%
New Jersey 3	Thomas J. Scully	Democratic	1910	Incumbent re-elected.	▌ ✓ Thomas J. Scully (Democratic) 50.65%; ▌W. Burtis Havens (Republican) 45.82%; ▌Thomas C. Easton (Prohibition) 2.25%; ▌Harry M. Shupe (Socialist) 1.27%
New Jersey 4	Allan B. Walsh	Democratic	1912	Incumbent lost re-election. Republican gain.	▌ ✓ Elijah C. Hutchinson (Republican) 50.9%; ▌Allan B. Walsh (Democratic) 41.03%; ▌J. Wiggans Thorn (Progressive) 5.1%; Others: ▌James W. Alexander (Socialist) 1.67%; ▌Nicholas H. Barrett (Prohibition) 0.97%; ▌Thomas Phillips (Socialist Labor) 0.33%
New Jersey 5	William E. Tuttle Jr.	Democratic	1910	Incumbent lost re-election. Republican gain.	▌ ✓ John H. Capstick (Republican) 45.68%; ▌William E. Tuttle Jr. (Democratic) 42.36%; ▌George U. May (Progressive) 5.98%; ▌John Seeholzer (Socialist) 5.0%; ▌Eugene Smith (Prohibition) 0.99%
New Jersey 6	Archibald C. Hart	Democratic	1912	Incumbent re-elected.	▌ ✓ Archibald C. Hart (Democratic) 45.38%; ▌John Dyneley Prince (Republican) 44.25%; ▌Walter C. Zabriskie (Progressive) 4.32%; ▌Frederick Krafft (Socialist) 2.57%; Others: ▌Mahlon B. Reed (Prohibition) 1.76%; ▌Morris McDermott (Ind. Democratic) 1.08%; ▌Rudolph Katz (Socialist Labor) 0.65%
New Jersey 7	Dow H. Drukker	Republican	1914 Special	Incumbent re-elected.	▌ ✓ Dow H. Drukker (Republican) 54.66%; ▌Walter C. Cabell (Democratic) 29.97%; ▌Gordon Demarest (Socialist) 14.55%; ▌Henry Jager (Socialist Labor) 0.82%
New Jersey 8	Eugene F. Kinkead	Democratic	1908	Incumbent resigned. Republican gain.	▌ ✓ Edward W. Gray (Republican) 44.95%; ▌Gerald E. McDonald (Democratic) 39.06%; ▌Arthur B. Archibald (Progressive) 7.47%; ▌Thomas J. Duffy (Ind. Democratic) 4.67%; ▌William N. Morton (Socialist) 3.22%; ▌Raymond A. Simmons (Prohibition) 0.64%
New Jersey 9	Walter I. McCoy	Democratic	1910	Incumbent resigned. Republican gain.	▌ ✓ Richard W. Parker (Republican) 37.3%; ▌Julian A. Gregory (Democratic) 31.74%; ▌Arthur B. Seymour (Democratic) 22.31%; ▌William E. Bohm (Socialist) 5.28%; ▌Joseph W. Roper (Progressive) 2.90%; ▌Edmund L. Roff (Prohibition) 0.46%
New Jersey 10	Edward W. Townsend	Democratic	1908	Incumbent lost re-election. Republican gain.	▌ ✓ Frederick R. Lehlbach (Republican) 47.5%; ▌Edward W. Townsend (Democratic) 42.37%; ▌Eliot E. Ford (Progressive) 4.92%; ▌George H. Goebel (Socialist) 3.35%; Others: ▌Harry J. Doyle (Jeffersonian Dem.) 1.34%; ▌Joseph A. Wiegand (Prohibition) 0.53%
New Jersey 11	John J. Eagan	Democratic	1912	Incumbent re-elected.	▌ ✓ John J. Eagan (Democratic) 65.16%; ▌Jacob Straus (Republican) 30.84%; ▌Gertude Reilly (Socialist) 4.01%
New Jersey 12	James A. Hamill	Democratic	1906	Incumbent re-elected.	▌ ✓ James A. Hamill (Democratic) 62.6%; ▌Marcus Higgenbotham (Republican) 28.41%; ▌J. Fisher Anderson (Prohibition) 5.06%; ▌Frank Power (Socialist) 3.2%; ▌James Parker (Prohibition) 0.73%

== New Mexico ==
District	Incumbent			This race	
District	Member	Party	First elected	Results	Candidates
New Mexico at-large	Harvey B. Fergusson	Democratic	1911	Incumbent lost re-election. Republican gain.	▌ ✓ Benigno C. Hernández (Republican) 51.31%; ▌Harvey B. Fergusson (Democratic) 42.67%; ▌F. C. Wilson (Progressive) 3.65%; ▌W. P. Metcalf (Socialist) 2.37%

== New York ==
District	Incumbent			This race	
District	Member	Party	First elected	Results	Candidates
New York 1	Lathrop Brown	Democratic	1912	Incumbent lost re-election. Republican gain.	▌ ✓ Frederick C. Hicks (Republican) 47.55%; ▌Lathrop Brown (Democratic) 47.54%; ▌Regis H. Post (Progressive) 3.4%; Others: ▌Walter A. Sinclair (Socialist) 0.78%; ▌George D. Horton (Prohibition) 0.74%
New York 2	Denis O'Leary	Democratic	1912	Incumbent resigned to become Queens District Attorney. Democratic hold.	▌ ✓ C. Pope Caldwell (Democratic) 54.47%; ▌Frank E. Hopkins (Republican) 26.95%; ▌Lawrence Gresser (Independence) 9.38%; ▌Benjamin Katz (Socialist) 6.01%; ▌John S. Moriartey (Progressive) 2.85%; ▌Jay N. Ballow (Prohibition) 0.35%
New York 3	Frank E. Wilson	Democratic	1910	Incumbent lost renomination. Democratic hold.	▌ ✓ Joseph V. Flynn (Democratic) 50.1%; ▌George B. Serenbetz (Republican) 37.11%; ▌Joseph E. Kleinn (Socialist) 6.91%; ▌Otto Wicke (Progressive) 3.47%; Others: ▌David Hunter (Independence) 1.95%; ▌William Irvine Sr. (Prohibition) 0.46%
New York 4	Harry H. Dale	Democratic	1912	Incumbent re-elected.	▌ ✓ Harry H. Dale (Democratic) 47%; ▌John Kissel (Republican) 32.86%; ▌Josefus Chante Lipes (Socialist) 11.18%; ▌Max Schaffer (Progressive) 8.4%; ▌Francis Hutchinson (Prohibition) 0.56%
New York 5	James P. Maher	Democratic	1910	Incumbent re-elected.	▌ ✓ James P. Maher (Democratic) 49.49%; ▌Alfred T. Hobley (Republican) 35.06%; ▌John S. Gaynor (Progressive) 10.58%; ▌John T. Vaughan (Socialist) 4.46%; ▌Preston E. Terry (Prohibition) 0.42%
New York 6	William M. Calder	Republican	1904	Incumbent retired to run for U.S. Senator. Republican hold.	▌ ✓ Frederick W. Rowe (Republican) 53.84%; ▌LeRoy W. Ross (Democratic) 39.13%; ▌Joseph M. Bacon (Progressive) 4.28%; ▌Charles H. Matchett (Socialist) 2.22%; ▌John D. Snyder (Prohibition) 0.53%
New York 7	John J. Fitzgerald	Democratic	1898	Incumbent re-elected.	▌ ✓ John J. Fitzgerald (Democratic) 65.87%; ▌C. G. Finney Wilcox (Republican) 29.11%; ▌Oliver F. Allen (Progressive) 2.64%; Others: ▌Alexander Fraser (Socialist) 1.99%; ▌Lewis C. Brown (Prohibition) 0.39%
New York 8	Daniel J. Griffin	Democratic	1912	Incumbent re-elected.	▌ ✓ Daniel J. Griffin (Democratic) 62.03%; ▌Thomas E. Clark (Republican) 30.49%; ▌Fred H. Schomburg (Progressive) 4.13%; ▌Andrew H. Wettergren (Socialist) 2.92%; ▌Charles A. Wilson (Prohibition) 0.44%
New York 9	James H. O'Brien	Democratic	1912	Incumbent lost re-election. Republican gain.	▌ ✓ Oscar W. Swift (Republican) 48.68%; ▌James H. O'Brien (Democratic) 39.96%; ▌Anna C. Wright (Socialist) 6.22%; ▌Thomas F. Larkin (Progressive) 4.59%; ▌William Howard Hoople (Prohibition) 0.56%
New York 10	Herman A. Metz	Democratic	1912	Incumbent lost renomination. Republican gain.	▌ ✓ Reuben L. Haskell (Republican) 40.54%; ▌Phillip A. Riley (Democratic) 30.8%; ▌Alexander S. Drescher (Anti-Boss) 14.24%; ▌Harry D. Smith (Socialist) 13.49%; Others: ▌Asa Francis Smith (Prohibition) 0.53%; ▌John O. Nelson (Independent Party) 0.42%
New York 11	Daniel J. Riordan	Democratic	1906 (special)	Incumbent re-elected.	▌ ✓ Daniel J. Riordan (Democratic) 58.97%; ▌George S. Schofield (Republican) 34.31%; ▌William Wirt Mills (Progressive) 4.15%; Others: ▌Rudolph Rochow (Socialist) 1.61%; ▌Hiram C. Horton (Prohibition) 0.97%
New York 12	Henry M. Goldfogle	Democratic	1900	Incumbent lost re-election. Socialist gain.	▌ ✓ Meyer London (Socialist) 49.54%; ▌Henry M. Goldfogle (Democratic) 41.06%; ▌Benjamin Borowsky (Republican) 9.4%
New York 13	George W. Loft	Democratic	1913 (special)	Incumbent re-elected.	▌ ✓ George W. Loft (Democratic) 58.22%; ▌James E. March (Republican) 30.23%; ▌Bouck White (Socialist) 11.55%
New York 14	Jefferson M. Levy	Democratic	1910	Incumbent lost renomination. Democratic hold.	▌ ✓ Michael F. Farley (Democratic) 46.52%; ▌Fiorello La Guardia (Republican) 33.93%; ▌Henry Slobodin (Socialist) 9.76%; ▌John B. Golden (Progressive) 9.27%; ▌James F. Gillespie (Prohibition) 0.52%
New York 15	Michael F. Conry	Democratic	1908	Incumbent re-elected.	▌ ✓ Michael F. Conry (Democratic) 65.07%; ▌Oscar W. Ehrhorn (Republican) 31.48%; ▌August Claessens (Socialist) 3.03%; ▌D. Leigh Colvin (Prohibition) 0.42%
New York 16	Peter J. Dooling	Democratic	1912	Incumbent re-elected.	▌ ✓ Peter J. Dooling (Democratic) 62.53%; ▌Harry B. Stowell (Republican) 29.2%; ▌William J. Moran (Progressive) 5.62%; ▌Solomon Fieldman (Socialist) 2.36%; ▌Matthew T. Lindsay (Prohibition) 0.29%
New York 17	John F. Carew	Democratic	1912	Incumbent re-elected.	▌ ✓ John F. Carew (Democratic) 53.69%; ▌Lindon Bates Jr. (Republican) 41.15%; ▌Charles W. Wood (Socialist) 4.82%; ▌Howard G. Myers (Prohibition) 0.34%
New York 18	Thomas G. Patten	Democratic	1910	Incumbent re-elected.	▌ ✓ Thomas G. Patten (Democratic) 53.24%; ▌George B. Francis (Republican) 37.7%; ▌Ernest Ramn (Socialist) 8.77%; ▌John A. Shedd (Prohibition) 0.3%
New York 19	Walter M. Chandler	Progressive	1912	Incumbent re-elected.	▌ ✓ Walter M. Chandler (Progressive) 40.51%; ▌Joseph L. Buttenwieser (Democratic) 38.5%; ▌Albert Ottinger (Republican) 17.4%; ▌Sergius Ingerman (Socialist) 3.31%; ▌Flavius J. Perry (Prohibition) 0.28%
New York 20	Jacob A. Cantor	Democratic	1913 (special)	Incumbent lost re-election. Republican gain.	▌ ✓ Isaac Siegel (Republican) 44.05%; ▌Jacob A. Cantor (Democratic) 43.33%; ▌Ludwig Schmidt (Socialist) 12.13%; ▌Volney B. Cashing (Prohibition) 0.49%
New York 21	Henry George Jr.	Democratic	1910	Incumbent lost renomination. Democratic hold.	▌ ✓ G. Murray Hulbert (Democratic) 51.2%; ▌Martin C. Ansorge (Republican) 43.46%; ▌Garibaldi M. Lapollo (Socialist) 4.89%; ▌Albert T. Hull (Prohibition) 0.44%
New York 22	Henry Bruckner	Democratic	1912	Incumbent re-elected.	▌ ✓ Henry Bruckner (Democratic) 62.36%; ▌Francis J. Kuerzi (Republican) 31.03%; ▌Maxie McDonald (Socialist) 6.17%; ▌Valentine W. Dutt (Prohibition) 0.45%
New York 23	Joseph A. Goulden	Democratic	1912	Incumbent re-elected.	▌ ✓ Joseph A. Goulden (Democratic) 44.14%; ▌Robert L. Niles (Republican) 28.28%; ▌Steven Beckwith Ayres (Progressive) 19.3%; ▌Meyer Rubinow (Socialist) 7.92%; ▌Richard G. Greene (Prohibition) 0.36%
New York 24	Woodson R. Oglesby	Democratic	1912	Incumbent re-elected.	▌ ✓ Woodson R. Oglesby (Democratic) 43.77%; ▌William Foster (Republican) 41.16%; ▌Alfred E. Smith (Progressive) 7.82%; ▌Allan L. Benson (Socialist) 5.57%; Others: ▌Benjamin L. Fairchild (Independence) 1.24%; ▌Frederick A. Victor (Prohibition) 0.45%
New York 25	Benjamin I. Taylor	Democratic	1912	Incumbent lost re-election. Republican gain.	▌ ✓ James W. Husted (Republican) 51.67%; ▌Benjamin I. Taylor (Democratic) 41.5%; ▌William J. Mertz (Progressive) 4.34%; Others: ▌Herman Kobbe (Socialist) 1.52%; ▌Schuyler C. Pew (Prohibition) 0.97%
New York 26	Edmund Platt	Republican	1912	Incumbent re-elected.	▌ ✓ Edmund Platt (Republican) 58%; ▌Alonzo F. Albott (Democratic) 38.64%; ▌William E. Peabody (Prohibition) 2.1%; ▌Harry Schefer (Socialist) 1.27%
New York 27	George McClellan	Democratic	1912	Incumbent lost re-election. Republican gain.	▌ ✓ Charles B. Ward (Republican) 53.03%; ▌George McClellan (Democratic) 42.59%; ▌James B. Palmer (Prohibition) 3.38%; ▌Dwight O. Whedon (Socialist) 1.0%
New York 28	Peter G. Ten Eyck	Democratic	1912	Incumbent lost re-election. Republican gain.	▌ ✓ Rollin B. Sanford (Republican) 51.87%; ▌Peter G. Ten Eyck (Democratic) 46.61%; Others: ▌John E. Dugan (Socialist) 1.01%; ▌August A. Ackert (Prohibition) 0.51%
New York 29	James S. Parker	Republican	1912	Incumbent re-elected.	▌ ✓ James S. Parker (Republican) 63.65%; ▌James Farrell (Democratic) 32.78%; ▌Mason B. Cole (Prohibition) 2.1%; ▌Benjamin F. Hall (Socialist) 1.47%
New York 30	Samuel Wallin	Republican	1912	Incumbent lost renomination. Republican hold.	▌ ✓ William B. Charles (Republican) 42.38%; ▌William C. D. Willson (Democratic) 25.52%; ▌Philip H. Callery (Socialist) 14.63%; ▌Theron Akin (Progressive) 13.1%; ▌William M. Brooks (Prohibition) 4.37%
New York 31	Edwin A. Merritt	Republican	1912 (special)	Incumbent re-elected.	▌ ✓ Edwin A. Merritt (Republican) 54.55%; ▌Andrew B. Cooney (Democratic) 24.17%; ▌Howard D. Hadley (Progressive) 16.47%; ▌Henry A. McIlmoyle (Prohibition) 2.74%; ▌William H. Daniels (Independence) 2.08%
New York 32	Luther W. Mott	Republican	1910	Incumbent re-elected.	▌ ✓ Luther W. Mott (Republican) 63.56%; ▌John Fitzgibbons (Democratic) 29.73%; ▌Eugene C. Groat (Prohibition) 4.86%; ▌George B. Chase (Socialist) 1.84%
New York 33	Charles A. Talcott	Democratic	1910	Incumbent lost re-election. Republican gain.	▌ ✓ Homer P. Snyder (Republican) 52.61%; ▌Charles A. Talcott (Democratic) 37.41%; ▌George H. Spitzli (Progressive) 6.42%; Others: ▌Charles H. Scholefield (Prohibition) 1.97%; ▌Otto L. Endres (Socialist) 1.59%
New York 34	George W. Fairchild	Republican	1906	Incumbent re-elected.	▌ ✓ George W. Fairchild (Republican) 56.16%; ▌George J. West (Democratic) 30.97%; ▌Albert S. Barnes (Progressive) 11.34%; ▌S. Howard Ammerman (Socialist) 1.53%
New York 35	John R. Clancy	Democratic	1912	Incumbent lost re-election. Republican gain.	▌ ✓ Walter W. Magee (Republican) 52.77%; ▌John R. Clancy (Democratic) 34.61%; ▌Hugh M. Tilroe (Progressive) 7.34%; ▌John W. Dennis (Socialist) 2.67%; ▌Claude A. Durall (Prohibition) 2.6%
New York 36	Sereno E. Payne	Republican	1889 (special)	Incumbent re-elected.	▌ ✓ Sereno E. Payne (Republican) 58.91%; ▌Herman L. Kelly (Democratic) 28.69%; ▌Amasa J. Parker (Progressive) 5.96%; ▌Wallace E. Brown (Prohibition) 5.22%; ▌Raymond D. Manning (Socialist) 1.22%
New York 37	Edwin S. Underhill	Democratic	1910	Incumbent lost renomination. Republican gain.	▌ ✓ Harry H. Pratt (Republican) 38.87%; ▌John Seeley (Democratic) 33.98%; ▌Milo Shanks (Prohibition) 20.4%; ▌Jonas S. Van Duzer (Progressive) 5.02%; ▌William W. Arland (Socialist) 1.74%
New York 38	Thomas B. Dunn	Republican	1912	Incumbent re-elected.	▌ ✓ Thomas B. Dunn (Republican) 57.67%; ▌George P. Decker (Democratic) 23.97%; ▌Oscar M. Arnold (Progressive) 14.45%; ▌Charles R. Bach (Socialist) 3.91%
New York 39	Henry G. Danforth	Republican	1910	Incumbent re-elected.	▌ ✓ Henry G. Danforth (Republican) 63.77%; ▌M. A. Bowen (Democratic) 26.31%; ▌Daniel M. Anthony (Progressive) 5.46%; ▌Albert J. Rumsey (Prohibition) 3.17%; ▌John E. O'Rourke (Socialist) 1.29%
New York 40	Robert H. Gittins	Democratic	1912	Incumbent lost re-election. Republican gain.	▌ ✓ S. Wallace Dempsey (Republican) 57.43%; ▌Robert H. Gittins (Democratic) 33.08%; ▌Frank C. Ferguson (Progressive) 6.16%; ▌George Moffett (Socialist) 2.18%; Others: ▌William Van R. Blighton (Prohibition) 0.97%; ▌Harry Fisher (Independence) 0.19%
New York 41	Charles B. Smith	Democratic	1910	Incumbent re-elected.	▌ ✓ Charles B. Smith (Democratic) 37.96%; ▌Frank J. Eberle (Republican) 36.07%; ▌Conrad J. Meyer (Progressive) 20.67%; ▌William F. Barnard (Socialist) 4.52%; ▌Charles R. Mair (Prohibition) 0.78%
New York 42	Daniel A. Driscoll	Democratic	1908	Incumbent re-elected.	▌ ✓ Daniel A. Driscoll (Democratic) 46.94%; ▌Willard H. Ticknor (Republican) 45.34%; ▌John J. Smith (Progressive) 4.54%; ▌Adam Schembs (Socialist) 2.47%; ▌Alvin W. Kyser (Prohibition) 0.71%
New York 43	Charles M. Hamilton	Republican	1912	Incumbent re-elected.	▌ ✓ Charles M. Hamilton (Republican) 60.6%; ▌Manton M. Wyvell (Democratic) 22.28%; ▌Ernest H. Woodruff (Prohibition) 6.31%; ▌Walter N. Renwick (Progressive) 6.2%; ▌Fred Shafer (Socialist) 4.61%

== North Carolina ==
District	Incumbent			This race	
District	Member	Party	First elected	Results	Candidates
North Carolina 1	John H. Small	Democratic	1898	Incumbent re-elected.	▌ ✓ John H. Small (Democratic) 99.78%; ▌W. M. Bond (Ind. Democratic) 0.22%
North Carolina 2	Claude Kitchin	Democratic	1900	Incumbent re-elected.	▌ ✓ Claude Kitchin (Democratic) 88.56%; ▌W. O. Dixon (Republican) 11.18%; Scattering 0.27%
North Carolina 3	John M. Faison	Democratic	1910	Incumbent retired. Democratic hold.	▌ ✓ George E. Hood (Democratic) 57.74%; ▌Buck H. Crumpler (Republican) 42.23%; Scattering 0.03%
North Carolina 4	Edward W. Pou	Democratic	1900	Incumbent re-elected.	▌ ✓ Edward W. Pou (Democratic) 57.74%; ▌Jesse A. Giles (Republican) 39.40%; ▌Joseph J. Jenkins (Populist) 3.31%; ▌James J. Templeton (Prohibition) 0.16%; Scattering 0.01%
North Carolina 5	Charles Manly Stedman	Democratic	1910	Incumbent re-elected.	▌ ✓ Charles Manly Stedman (Democratic) 58.67%; ▌ Charles A. Reynolds (Republican) 41.06%; ▌ J.W. Kester (Socialist) 0.27%
North Carolina 6	Hannibal L. Godwin	Democratic	1906	Incumbent re-elected.	▌ ✓ Hannibal L. Godwin (Democratic)
North Carolina 7	Robert N. Page	Democratic	1902	Incumbent re-elected.	▌ ✓ Robert N. Page (Democratic)
North Carolina 8	Robert L. Doughton	Democratic	1910	Incumbent re-elected.	▌ ✓ Robert L. Doughton (Democratic)
North Carolina 9	Edwin Y. Webb	Democratic	1902	Incumbent re-elected.	▌ ✓ Edwin Y. Webb (Democratic)
North Carolina 10	James M. Gudger Jr.	Democratic	1902; 1906 (lost); 1910	Incumbent lost re-election. Republican gain.	▌ ✓ James Jefferson Britt (Republican) ▌ James M. Gudger Jr. (Democratic)

== North Dakota ==
District	Incumbent			This race	
District	Member	Party	First elected	Results	Candidates
North Dakota 1	Henry T. Helgesen	Republican	1910	Incumbent re-elected.	▌ ✓ Henry T. Helgesen (Republican) 55.97%; ▌Fred Bartholomew (Democratic) 41.28%; ▌Leon Durocher (Socialist) 2.74%
North Dakota 2	George M. Young	Republican	1912	Incumbent re-elected.	▌ ✓ George M. Young (Republican) 68.41%; ▌James J. Weeks (Democratic) 25.90%; ▌N. H. Bjornstad (Socialist) 5.69%
North Dakota 3	Patrick Norton	Republican	1912	Incumbent re-elected.	▌ ✓ Patrick Norton (Republican) 57.05%; ▌Halvor L. Halvorson (Democratic) 27.13%; ▌S. Griffith (Socialist) 13.94%; ▌H. R. Ringoen (Independent) 1.88%

== Ohio ==
District	Incumbent			This race	
District	Member	Party	First elected	Results	Candidates
Ohio 1
Ohio 2
Ohio 3
Ohio 4
Ohio 5
Ohio 6
Ohio 7
Ohio 8
Ohio 9
Ohio 10
Ohio 11
Ohio 12
Ohio 13
Ohio 14
Ohio 15
Ohio 16
Ohio 17
Ohio 18
Ohio 19
Ohio 20
Ohio 21
Ohio 22

== Oklahoma ==
District	Incumbent			This race	
District	Member	Party	First elected	Results	Candidates
Oklahoma 1	Bird S. McGuire	Republican	1907	Incumbent retired. Republican loss.	▌ ✓ James S. Davenport (Democratic) 46.4%; ▌Joseph A. Gill (Republican) 42.7%; ▌G. A. Lafayette (Socialist) 9.9%; ▌Lloyd G. Owen (Progressive) 1.1%
Oklahoma 1	James S. Davenport; Redistricted from the 3rd district	Democratic	1910	Incumbent re-elected.	▌ ✓ James S. Davenport (Democratic) 46.4%; ▌Joseph A. Gill (Republican) 42.7%; ▌G. A. Lafayette (Socialist) 9.9%; ▌Lloyd G. Owen (Progressive) 1.1%
Oklahoma 2	None (new district)			New seat. Democratic gain.	▌ ✓ William W. Hastings (Democratic) 49.1%; ▌Charles A. Cook (Republican) 33.1%; ▌Clifford S. Crain (Socialist) 17.1%; Others: ▌P. E. Reed (Progressive) 0.6%; ▌Taylor H. Ebersole (Prohibition) 0.2%
Oklahoma 3	Charles D. Carter; Redistricted from the 4th district	Democratic	1907	Incumbent re-elected.	▌ ✓ Charles D. Carter (Democratic) 50.0%; ▌R. L. Norman (Socialist) 30.7%; ▌C. H. Elting (Republican) 18.8%; ▌Dudley B. Buell (Progressive) 0.6%
Oklahoma 4	William H. Murray; Redistricted from the at-large seat	Democratic	1912	Incumbent re-elected.	▌ ✓ William H. Murray (Democratic) 42.2%; ▌James D. Flynn (Republican) 28.9%; ▌Marion Hughes (Socialist) 28.2%; ▌E. N. Wright (Progressive) 0.8%
Oklahoma 5	Joseph B. Thompson; Redistricted from the at-large seat	Democratic	1912	Incumbent re-elected.	▌ ✓ Joseph B. Thompson (Democratic) 47.5%; ▌D. K. Pope (Republican) 31.4%; ▌W. L. Lurry (Socialist) 18.3%; ▌Albert Rennie (Progressive) 2.3%; ▌J. E. Brewer (Prohibition) 0.5%
Oklahoma 5	Claude Weaver; Redistricted from the at-large seat	Democratic	1912	Incumbent lost renomination. Democratic loss.	▌ ✓ Joseph B. Thompson (Democratic) 47.5%; ▌D. K. Pope (Republican) 31.4%; ▌W. L. Lurry (Socialist) 18.3%; ▌Albert Rennie (Progressive) 2.3%; ▌J. E. Brewer (Prohibition) 0.5%
Oklahoma 6	Scott Ferris; Redistricted from the 5th district	Democratic	1907	Incumbent re-elected.	▌ ✓ Scott Ferris (Democratic) 48.1%; ▌Alvin Campbell (Republican) 27.4%; ▌J. T. Cumbie (Socialist) 22.0%; ▌E. L. Persons (Progressive) 2.1%; ▌Thomas H. Allen (Prohibition) 0.4%
Oklahoma 7	None (new district)			New seat. Democratic gain.	▌ ✓ James V. McClintic (Democratic) 43.1%; ▌H. H. Stallard (Socialist) 33.2%; ▌Walter S. Mills (Republican) 22.5%; ▌Henry S. Vogle (Progressive) 1.2%
Oklahoma 8	Dick T. Morgan; Redistricted from the 2nd district	Republican	1908	Incumbent re-elected.	▌ ✓ Dick T. Morgan (Republican) 41.8%; ▌Henry S. Johnston (Democratic) 39.1%; ▌G. M. Green (Socialist) 13.3%; ▌Charles R. Alexander (Progressive) 5.2%; ▌Charles Brown (Prohibition) 0.7%

== Oregon ==
District	Incumbent			This race	
District	Member	Party	First elected	Results	Candidates
Oregon 1	Willis C. Hawley	Republican	1906	Incumbent re-elected.	▌ ✓ Willis C. Hawley (Republican) 46.39%; ▌Frederick Hollister (Democratic) 29.52%; ▌Curtis P. Coe (Prohibition) 14.89%; ▌W. S. Richards (Socialist) 6.71%; ▌Fred W. Mears (Progressive) 2.49%
Oregon 2	Nicholas J. Sinnott	Republican	1912	Incumbent re-elected.	▌ ✓ Nicholas J. Sinnott (Republican) 47.52%; ▌George L. Cleaver (Prohibition) 30.83%; ▌Sam Evans (Democratic) 21.65%
Oregon 3	Walter Lafferty	Republican	1910	Incumbent lost re-election as an independent. Republican hold.	▌ ✓ Clifton N. McArthur (Republican) 35.55%; ▌A. F. Flegel Sr. (Democratic) 31.62%; ▌Walter Lafferty (Independent) 22.22%; ▌Arthur L. Moulton (Progressive) 7.70%; ▌Albert Streiff (Socialist) 2.91%

== Pennsylvania ==
District	Incumbent			This race	
District	Member	Party	First elected	Results	Candidates
Pennsylvania 1	William S. Vare	Republican	1912 (special)	Incumbent re-elected.	▌ ✓ William S. Vare (Republican) 77.6%; ▌John Burt (Progressive) 11.0%; ▌Lawrence E. McCrossin (Democratic) 10.3%; ▌L. S. Santamarie (Socialist) 1.1%
Pennsylvania 2	George S. Graham	Republican	1912	Incumbent re-elected.	▌ ✓ George S. Graham (Republican) 77.4%; ▌Patrick P. Conway (Democratic) 20.9%; Others: ▌Thomas Birtwistle (Socialist) 1.4%; ▌Isaac Briggs (Prohibition) 0.4%
Pennsylvania 3	J. Hampton Moore	Republican	1906 (special)	Incumbent re-elected.	▌ ✓ J. Hampton Moore (Republican) 54.1%; ▌John H. Fow (Democratic) 21.7%; ▌Harry E. Walter (Progressive) 20.7%; ▌George Ruby (Socialist) 3.5%
Pennsylvania 4	George W. Edmonds	Republican	1912	Incumbent re-elected.	▌ ✓ George W. Edmonds (Republican) 83.2%; ▌Patrick H. Lynch (Democratic) 14.2%; ▌George H. Ulrich (Socialist) 2.2%; ▌John Hay (Prohibition) 0.4%
Pennsylvania 5	Michael Donohoe	Democratic	1910	Incumbent lost re-election. Republican gain.	▌ ✓ Peter E. Costello (Republican) 60.8%; ▌Michael Donohoe (Democratic) 34.9%; ▌John N. Landberg (Socialist) 3.4%; ▌Ernest M. Vail (Prohibition) 0.9%
Pennsylvania 6	J. Washington Logue	Democratic	1912	Incumbent lost re-election. Republican gain.	▌ ✓ George P. Darrow (Republican) 56.1%; ▌J. Washington Logue (Democratic) 21.6%; ▌Frederick S. Drake (Progressive) 20.5%; Others: ▌Raymond H. Miller (Socialist) 1.6%; ▌I. W. Huckins (Prohibition) 0.4%
Pennsylvania 7	Thomas S. Butler	Republican	1896	Incumbent re-elected.	▌ ✓ Thomas S. Butler (Republican) 63.6%; ▌Norris B. Slack (Democratic) 22.8%; ▌Arthur H. Tomlinson (Progressive) 11.2%; Others: ▌Daniel G. Hendricks (Prohibition) 1.4%; ▌Walter N. Lodge (Socialist) 1.1%
Pennsylvania 8	Robert E. Difenderfer	Democratic	1912	Incumbent lost renomination. Republican gain.	▌ ✓ Henry W. Watson (Republican) 50.9%; ▌Harry E. Grim (Democratic) 35.2%; ▌Harold G. Knight (Progressive) 11.1%; ▌Jacob D. Metz (Socialist) 2.2%
Pennsylvania 9	William W. Griest	Republican	1908	Incumbent re-elected.	▌ ✓ William W. Griest (Republican) 61.0%; ▌John N. Hetrick (Democratic) 36.6%; Others: ▌S. S. Watts (Prohibition) 1.5%; ▌William W. Halligan (Socialist) 1.0%
Pennsylvania 10	John R. Farr	Republican	1910	Incumbent re-elected.	▌ ✓ John R. Farr (Republican) 54.7%; ▌John J. Loftus (Democratic) 40.0%; ▌Oliver F. Peasnall (Prohibition) 3.8%; ▌John W. Hopkins (Socialist) 1.6%
Pennsylvania 11	John J. Casey	Democratic	1912	Incumbent re-elected.	▌ ✓ John J. Casey (Democratic) 57.1%; ▌Lewis P. Kniffen (Republican) 40.2%; Others: ▌Lorenzo B. Avery (Socialist) 1.6%; ▌Frank Argust (Prohibition) 1.1%
Pennsylvania 12	Robert E. Lee	Democratic	1910	Incumbent lost re-election. Republican gain.	▌ ✓ Robert D. Heaton (Republican) 53.7%; ▌Robert E. Lee (Democratic) 38.7%; ▌William W. Thorn (Progressive) 5.1%; ▌Thomas J. Thomas (Socialist) 2.6%
Pennsylvania 13	John H. Rothermel	Democratic	1906	Incumbent lost renomination. Democratic hold.	▌ ✓ Arthur G. Dewalt (Democratic) 45.5%; ▌John Stauffer (Republican) 33.9%; ▌John L. Stewart (Progressive) 10.3%; ▌Birch Wilson (Socialist) 9.5%; ▌Madison Larkin (Prohibition) 0.8%
Pennsylvania 14	William D. B. Ainey	Republican	1911 (special)	Incumbent retired. Republican hold.	▌ ✓ Louis T. McFadden (Republican) 40.3%; ▌Fred W. Dean (Democratic) 27.4%; ▌Dana R. Stephens (Progressive) 27.3%; ▌Gates S. Comstock (Prohibition) 4.0%; ▌George Schrimp (Socialist) 1.1%
Pennsylvania 15	Edgar R. Kiess	Republican	1912	Incumbent re-elected.	▌ ✓ Edgar R. Kiess (Republican) 41.8%; ▌John J. Reardon (Democratic) 29.5%; ▌Montfort T. Stokes (Progressive) 23.4%; ▌Peter J. Homler (Socialist) 5.3%
Pennsylvania 16	John V. Lesher	Democratic	1912	Incumbent re-elected.	▌ ✓ John V. Lesher (Democratic) 44.3%; ▌Charles E. Robbins (Republican) 31.2%; ▌W. W. Heffner (Progressive) 16.1%; ▌Edward G. Renn (Socialist) 4.8%; ▌W. L. Norton (Prohibition) 2.0%; ▌Theodore C. Harter (Independent) 1.6%
Pennsylvania 17	Franklin L. Dershem	Democratic	1912	Incumbent lost re-election. Republican gain.	▌ ✓ Benjamin K. Focht (Republican) 41.4%; ▌Franklin L. Dershem (Democratic) 38.3%; ▌Charles L. Johnson (Progressive) 17.2%; ▌William G. Bowers (Socialist) 3.1%
Pennsylvania 18	Aaron S. Kreider	Republican	1912	Incumbent re-elected.	▌ ✓ Aaron S. Kreider (Republican) 52.3%; ▌David L. Kaufman (Democratic) 28.9%; ▌John H. Kreider (Progressive) 14.0%; ▌J. Milton Ibach (Socialist) 3.0%; ▌W. J. Edelman (Prohibition) 1.7%
Pennsylvania 19	Warren W. Bailey	Democratic	1912	Incumbent re-elected.	▌ ✓ Warren W. Bailey (Democratic) 35.8%; ▌Jesse L. Hartman (Republican) 34.6%; ▌Lynn A. Brua (Progressive) 24.5%; ▌P. M. Swanger (Socialist) 4.1%; ▌John W. Blake (Blacksmith) 1.0%
Pennsylvania 20	Andrew R. Brodbeck	Democratic	1912	Incumbent lost re-election. Republican gain.	▌ ✓ C. William Beales (Republican) 45.3%; ▌Andrew R. Brodbeck (Democratic) 43.0%; ▌Robert C. Bair (Progressive) 7.7%; ▌Henry W. Logeman (Socialist) 2.5%; ▌John J. Stauffer (Prohibition) 1.6%
Pennsylvania 21	Charles E. Patton	Republican	1910	Incumbent retired. Republican hold.	▌ ✓ Charles H. Rowland (Republican) 39.3%; ▌William E. Tobias (Democratic) 35.3%; ▌Guy B. Mayo (Progressive) 17.3%; ▌Frank C. Rittenhouse (Socialist) 4.9%; ▌S. W. McLarren (Prohibition) 3.2%
Pennsylvania 22	Abraham L. Keister	Republican	1912	Incumbent re-elected.	▌ ✓ Abraham L. Keister (Republican) 43.7%; ▌James B. Hammond (Democratic) 42.5%; ▌Joseph B. Slack (Socialist) 8.2%; ▌A. P. Hutchison (Prohibition) 5.6%
Pennsylvania 23	Wooda N. Carr	Democratic	1912	Incumbent lost re-election. Republican gain.	▌ ✓ Robert F. Hopwood (Republican) 44.7%; ▌Wooda N. Carr (Democratic) 36.9%; ▌Charles F. Hood (Progressive) 11.1%; ▌Washington Herd (Socialist) 4.5%; ▌Daniel Sturgeon (Prohibition) 2.8%
Pennsylvania 24	Henry W. Temple	Progressive	1912	Incumbent lost re-election. Republican gain.	▌ ✓ William M. Brown (Note: Brown died on January 31, 1915 before taking office.) (Republican) 41.0%; ▌Henry W. Temple (Progressive) 30.1%; ▌Samuel A. Barnum (Democratic) 19.7%; ▌H. R. Norman (Socialist) 6.6%; ▌J. T. Pender (Prohibition) 2.7%
Pennsylvania 25	Milton W. Shreve	Republican	1912	Incumbent lost re-election. Democratic gain.	▌ ✓ Michael Liebel Jr. (Democratic) 36.6%; ▌Milton W. Shreve (Republican) 33.6%; ▌Frank C. Lockwood (Progressive) 23.5%; ▌F. J. Weaver (Socialist) 6.3%
Pennsylvania 26	A. Mitchell Palmer	Democratic	1908	Incumbent retired to run for U.S. Senator. Democratic hold.	▌ ✓ Henry J. Steele (Democratic) 51.3%; ▌John D. Hoffman (Republican) 28.2%; ▌Edward Hart (Progressive) 15.8%; ▌Howard Flagler (Prohibition) 2.4%; ▌Porter V. Cargill (Socialist) 2.3%
Pennsylvania 27	J. N. Langham	Republican	1908	Incumbent retired. Republican hold.	▌ ✓ S. Taylor North (Republican) 36.5%; ▌R. M. Matson (Democratic) 30.5%; ▌Charles P. Wolfe (Progressive) 23.3%; ▌Samuel Dible (Prohibition) 5.8%; ▌Reuben Einstein (Socialist) 3.9%
Pennsylvania 28	Willis J. Hulings	Progressive	1912	Incumbent lost re-election. Republican gain.	▌ ✓ Samuel H. Miller (Republican) 30.8%; ▌William McIntyre (Democratic) 26.4%; ▌Willis J. Hulings (Progressive) 22.4%; ▌William P. Ferguson (Prohibition) 14.5%; ▌William McKay (Socialist) 5.9%
Pennsylvania 29	Stephen G. Porter	Republican	1910	Incumbent re-elected.	▌ ✓ Stephen G. Porter (Republican) 76.1%; ▌John M. Henry (Democratic) 14.7%; ▌Henry Peter (Socialist) 7.0%; ▌W. F. Stadtlander (Progressive) 2.3%
Pennsylvania 30	M. Clyde Kelly	Republican	1912	Incumbent lost re-election as a Progressive. Republican hold.	▌ ✓ William H. Coleman (Republican) 48.7%; ▌M. Clyde Kelly (Progressive) 44.7%; ▌Andrew Hunter (Socialist) 6.5%; ▌J. A. Brought (Industrialist) 0.1%
Pennsylvania 31	John M. Morin; Redistricted from the at-large district	Republican	1912	Incumbent re-elected.	▌ ✓ John M. Morin (Republican) 78.2%; ▌William A. Prosser (Socialist) 19.2%; ▌W. J. Moore (Progressive) 2.6%
Pennsylvania 32	Andrew J. Barchfeld	Republican	1904	Incumbent re-elected.	▌ ✓ Andrew J. Barchfeld (Republican) 47.0%; ▌William M. Shrodes (Progressive) 24.7%; ▌Guy E. Campbell (Democratic) 20.6%; ▌John W. Slayton (Socialist) 7.7%
Pennsylvania at-large 4 seats on a general ticket	Fred E. Lewis	Republican	1912	Incumbent retired. Republican hold.	▌ ✓ Thomas S. Crago (Republican) 12.4%; ▌ ✓ John R. K. Scott (Republican) 12.4%; ▌ ✓ Mahlon M. Garland (Republican) 12.2%; ▌ ✓ Daniel F. Lafean (Republican) 12.1%; ▌Robert S. Bright (Democratic) 6.8%; ▌Arthur B. Clark (Democratic) 6.6%; ▌Martin J. Caton (Democratic) 6.4%; ▌Charles N. Crosby (Democratic) 6.3%; ▌Lex N. Mitchell (Progressive) 4.7%; ▌Arthur R. Rupley (Progressive) 4.5%; ▌Anderson H. Walters (Progressive) 4.5%; ▌Harry Watson (Progressive) 4.4%; Others: ▌Edward W. Haydon (Socialist) 1.1%; ▌W. Greeley King (Socialist) 1.0%; ▌Dennis O. Coughlin (Socialist) 1.0%; ▌Charles Sehl (Socialist) 1.0%; ▌George Hart (Prohibition) 0.7%; ▌James J. Patton (Prohibition) 0.7%; ▌S. Harper Smith (Prohibition) 0.6%; ▌B. R. Pike (Prohibition) 0.6%
Pennsylvania at-large 4 seats on a general ticket	James F. Burke; Redistricted from the 31st district	Republican	1904	Incumbent retired. Republican hold.	
Pennsylvania at-large 4 seats on a general ticket	Anderson H. Walters	Republican	1912	Incumbent lost re-election as a Progressive. Republican hold.	
Pennsylvania at-large 4 seats on a general ticket	Arthur R. Rupley	Republican	1912	Incumbent lost re-election as a Progressive. Republican hold.	

== Rhode Island ==
District	Incumbent			This race	
District	Member	Party	First elected	Results	Candidates
Rhode Island 1
Rhode Island 2
Rhode Island 3

== South Carolina ==
District	Incumbent			This race	
District	Member	Party	First elected	Results	Candidates
South Carolina 1	Richard S. Whaley	Democratic	1913 (special)	Incumbent re-elected.	▌ ✓ Richard S. Whaley (Democratic) 98.5%; ▌Aaron P. Prioleau (Republican) 1.0%; ▌William Eberhard (Socialist) 0.5%
South Carolina 2	James F. Byrnes	Democratic	1910	Incumbent re-elected.	▌ ✓ James F. Byrnes (Democratic) 100%
South Carolina 3	Wyatt Aiken	Democratic	1902	Incumbent re-elected.	▌ ✓ Wyatt Aiken (Democratic) 100%
South Carolina 4	Joseph T. Johnson	Democratic	1900	Incumbent re-elected.	▌ ✓ Joseph T. Johnson (Democratic) 99.5%; ▌J. W. Sexton (Republican) 0.3%; ▌M. I. Ellenberg (Socialist) 0.2%
South Carolina 5	David E. Finley	Democratic	1898	Incumbent re-elected.	▌ ✓ David E. Finley (Democratic) 100%
South Carolina 6	J. Willard Ragsdale	Democratic	1912	Incumbent re-elected.	▌ ✓ J. Willard Ragsdale (Democratic) 100%
South Carolina 7	A. Frank Lever	Democratic	1901 (special)	Incumbent re-elected.	▌ ✓ A. Frank Lever (Democratic) 95.1%; ▌I. S. Leevy (Republican) 4.1%; ▌George F. Lee (Socialist) 0.8%

== South Dakota ==
District	Incumbent			This race	
District	Member	Party	First elected	Results	Candidates
South Dakota 1	Charles H. Dillon	Republican	1912	Incumbent re-elected.	▌ ✓ Charles H. Dillon (Republican) 57.85%; ▌Theodore Bailey (Democratic) 35.87%; ▌K. B. Stakke (Prohibition) 2.24%; ▌D. C. Bond (Socialist) 2.08%; ▌A. L. van Osdel (Independent) 1.95%
South Dakota 2	Charles H. Burke; Redistricted from the at-large district	Republican	1908	Incumbent retired to run for U.S. Senator. Republican hold.	▌ ✓ Royal C. Johnson (Republican) 58.05%; ▌John M. King (Democratic) 33.90%; ▌E. Francis Atwood (Socialist) 2.99%; ▌V. B. Jump (Prohibition) 2.88%; ▌H. P. Packard (Independent) 2.19%
South Dakota 3	Eben Martin; Redistricted from the at-large district	Republican	1908	Incumbent retired. Democratic gain.	▌ ✓ Harry Gandy (Democratic) 51.79%; ▌William G. Rice (Republican) 44.63%; ▌Fred L. Fairchild (Socialist) 3.58%

== Tennessee ==
District	Incumbent			This race	
District	Member	Party	First elected	Results	Candidates
Tennessee 1	Sam R. Sells	Republican	1910	Incumbent re-elected.	▌ ✓ Sam R. Sells (Republican) 61.27%; ▌James B. Cox (Progressive) 29.76%; ▌Cyrus H. Lyle (Democratic) 8.97%
Tennessee 2	Richard W. Austin	Republican	1908	Incumbent re-elected.	▌ ✓ Richard W. Austin (Republican) 66.98%; ▌Harvey H. Hannah (Democratic) 31.30%; ▌R. E. Miller (Independent) 1.73%
Tennessee 3	John A. Moon	Democratic	1896	Incumbent re-elected.	▌ ✓ John A. Moon (Democratic) 90.19%; ▌G. W. James (Republican) 9.81%
Tennessee 4	Cordell Hull	Democratic	1906	Incumbent re-elected.	▌ ✓ Cordell Hull (Democratic) 98.23%; ▌E. D. White (Independent) 1.04%; ▌Robert Price (Independent) 0.73%
Tennessee 5	William C. Houston	Democratic	1904	Incumbent re-elected.	▌ ✓ William C. Houston (Democratic) 71.66%; ▌H. C. Watts (Independent) 28.34%
Tennessee 6	Jo Byrns	Democratic	1908	Incumbent re-elected.	▌ ✓ Jo Byrns (Democratic) 94.42%; ▌J. W. Eakin (Socialist) 3.92%; ▌A. A. Mooney (Independent) 1.66%
Tennessee 7	Lemuel P. Padgett	Democratic	1900	Incumbent re-elected.	▌ ✓ Lemuel P. Padgett (Democratic) 97.32%; ▌D. J. Bevis (Independent) 2.68%
Tennessee 8	Thetus W. Sims	Democratic	1896	Incumbent re-elected.	▌ ✓ Thetus W. Sims (Democratic) 54.38%; ▌J. E. DeFord (Republican) 44.99%; ▌R. P. Farmer (Independent) 0.63%
Tennessee 9	Finis J. Garrett	Democratic	1904	Incumbent re-elected.	▌ ✓ Finis J. Garrett (Democratic) 83.19%; ▌B. C. Cochran (Republican) 16.35%; ▌W. P. Antlow (Independent) 0.46%
Tennessee 10	Kenneth McKellar	Democratic	1911 (special)	Incumbent re-elected.	▌ ✓ Kenneth McKellar (Democratic) 92.98%; ▌J. O. Davison (Independent) 7.02%

== Texas ==
District	Incumbent			This race	
District	Member	Party	First elected	Results	Candidates
Texas 1
Texas 2
Texas 3
Texas 4
Texas 5
Texas 6
Texas 7
Texas 8
Texas 9
Texas 10
Texas 11
Texas 12
Texas 13
Texas 14
Texas 15
Texas 16
Texas at-large 2 seats on a general ticket

== Utah ==
District	Incumbent			This race	
District	Member	Party	First elected	Results	Candidates
Utah 1	Joseph Howell; Redistricted from the at-large district	Republican	1902	Incumbent re-elected.	▌ ✓ Joseph Howell (Republican) 49.36%; ▌Lewis Larson (Democratic) 45.94%; ▌Ben Jansen (Socialist) 4.71%
Utah 2	Jacob Johnson; Redistricted from the at-large district	Republican	1912	Incumbent lost renomination. Democratic gain.	▌ ✓ James H. Mays (Democratic) 47.49%; ▌Elmer O. Leatherwood (Republican) 47.20%; ▌A. H. Kempton (Socialist) 5.30%

== Vermont ==
District	Incumbent			This race	
District	Member	Party	First elected	Results	Candidates
Vermont 1	Frank L. Greene	Republican	1912 (special)	Incumbent re-elected.	▌ ✓ Frank L. Greene (Republican) 62.9%; ▌Daniel E. O'Sullivan (Democratic) 22.3%; ▌Raymond McFarland (Progressive) 13.3%; ▌Marcus P. Armstrong (Socialist) 1.0%
Vermont 2	Frank Plumley	Republican	1908	Incumbent retired. Republican hold.	▌ ✓ Porter H. Dale (Republican) 57.5%; ▌John B. Reardon (Democratic) 22.2%; ▌Fraser Metzger (Prohibition) 17.7%; ▌John P. Marsh (Socialist) 2.5%

== Virginia ==
District	Incumbent			This race	
District	Member	Party	First elected	Results	Candidates
Virginia 1	William A. Jones	Democratic	1890	Incumbent re-elected.	▌ ✓ William A. Jones (Democratic) 93.0%; ▌T. E. Coleman (Socialist) 4.4%; Others: ▌Godfrey Kinder (Socialist Labor) 1.8%; ▌Benjamin F. Gunter (Socialist) 0.8%
Virginia 2	Edward E. Holland	Democratic	1910	Incumbent re-elected.	▌ ✓ Edward E. Holland (Democratic) 88.0%; ▌E. B. Everton (Socialist) 8.8%; ▌S. L. Ford (Socialist Labor) 3.2%
Virginia 3	Andrew J. Montague	Democratic	1912	Incumbent re-elected.	▌ ✓ Andrew J. Montague (Democratic) 95.8%; ▌S. C. Weatherly (Socialist) 3.1%; ▌H. Adolph Muller (Socialist Labor) 1.1%
Virginia 4	Walter A. Watson	Democratic	1912	Incumbent re-elected.	▌ ✓ Walter A. Watson (Democratic) 96.2%; ▌Fred Herzig (Socialist) 3.8%
Virginia 5	Edward W. Saunders	Democratic	1906 (special)	Incumbent re-elected.	▌ ✓ Edward W. Saunders (Democratic) 65.5%; ▌Charles A. Heermans (Republican) 27.8%; ▌William A. Fulton (Independent) 4.3%; ▌W. R. Keele (Socialist) 2.4%
Virginia 6	Carter Glass	Democratic	1902 (special)	Incumbent re-elected.	▌ ✓ Carter Glass (Democratic) 90.7%; ▌B. F. Ginther (Socialist) 9.3%
Virginia 7	James Hay	Democratic	1896	Incumbent re-elected.	▌ ✓ James Hay (Democratic) 87.0%; ▌E. C. Garrison (Republican) 13.0%
Virginia 8	Charles C. Carlin	Democratic	1907 (special)	Incumbent re-elected.	▌ ✓ Charles C. Carlin (Democratic) 75.4%; ▌Joseph L. Crupper (Republican) 22.5%; Others: ▌James E. Johnston (Independent) 1.7%; ▌Milton Fling (Socialist) 0.4%
Virginia 9	C. Bascom Slemp	Republican	1907 (special)	Incumbent re-elected.	▌ ✓ C. Bascom Slemp (Republican) 51.4%; ▌Robert Tate Irvine (Democratic) 47.5%; Others: ▌John L. Rose (Progressive) 0.7%; ▌B. M. Dutton (Socialist) 0.4%
Virginia 10	Henry D. Flood	Democratic	1900	Incumbent re-elected.	▌ ✓ Henry D. Flood (Democratic) 68.4%; ▌George A. Revercomb (Republican) 30.1%; ▌Nathan Parkins (Socialist) 1.5%

== Washington ==
District	Incumbent			This race	
District	Member	Party	First elected	Results	Candidates
Washington 1	William E. Humphrey	Republican	1902	Incumbent re-elected.	▌ ✓ William E. Humphrey (Republican) 36.9%; ▌William Hickman Moore (Democratic) 26.7%; ▌Austin E. Griffith (Progressive) 26.4%; ▌Glenn E. Hoover (Socialist) 8.5%; ▌Charles M. Morgan (Prohibition) 1.4%
Washington 1	James W. Bryan; Redistricted from the at-large district	Progressive	1912	Incumbent lost renomination. Progressive loss.	▌ ✓ William E. Humphrey (Republican) 36.9%; ▌William Hickman Moore (Democratic) 26.7%; ▌Austin E. Griffith (Progressive) 26.4%; ▌Glenn E. Hoover (Socialist) 8.5%; ▌Charles M. Morgan (Prohibition) 1.4%
Washington 1	Jacob Falconer; Redistricted from the at-large district	Progressive	1912	Incumbent retired. Progressive loss.	▌ ✓ William E. Humphrey (Republican) 36.9%; ▌William Hickman Moore (Democratic) 26.7%; ▌Austin E. Griffith (Progressive) 26.4%; ▌Glenn E. Hoover (Socialist) 8.5%; ▌Charles M. Morgan (Prohibition) 1.4%
Washington 2	None (new district)			New seat. Republican gain.	▌ ✓ Lindley H. Hadley (Republican) 35.8%; ▌Earl W. Husted (Democratic) 22.9%; ▌J. E. Campbell (Progressive) 21.9%; ▌George E. Boomer (Socialist) 15.4%; ▌H. T. Murray (Prohibition) 4.1%
Washington 3	Albert Johnson; Redistricted from the 2nd district	Republican	1912	Incumbent re-elected.	▌ ✓ Albert Johnson (Republican) 42.6%; ▌Charles Drury (Democratic) 27.9%; ▌S. Warburton (Progressive) 14.8%; ▌Leslie E. Aller (Socialist) 11.1%; ▌Walter F. McDowell (Prohibition) 2.2%; ▌Thomas Harlan (Socialist Workers) 1.4%
Washington 4	William La Follette; Redistricted from the 3rd district	Republican	1910	Incumbent re-elected.	▌ ✓ William La Follette (Republican) 46.2%; ▌Roscoe M. Drumheller (Democratic) 30.6%; ▌M. A. Peacock (Progressive) 12.6%; ▌John Storland (Socialist) 6.0%; ▌J. V. Mohr (Prohibition) 4.6%
Washington 5	None (new district)			New seat. Democratic gain.	▌ ✓ Clarence Dill (Democratic) 36.6%; ▌Harry Rosenhaupt (Republican) 30.0%; ▌Thomas Corkery (Progressive) 23.2%; ▌J. C. Harkness (Socialist) 6.8%; ▌F. H. Flanders (Prohibition) 3.4%

== West Virginia ==
District	Incumbent			This race	
District	Member	Party	First elected	Results	Candidates
West Virginia 1	Matthew M. Neely	Democratic	1913 (special)	Incumbent re-elected.	▌ ✓ Matthew M. Neely (Democratic) 44.42%; ▌George E. White (Republican) 43.45%; ▌Mathew S. Holt (Socialist) 6.42%; ▌Harvey W. Harmer (Progressive) 4.44%; ▌Albert B. Withers (Prohibition) 1.27%
West Virginia 2	William G. Brown Jr.	Democratic	1910	Incumbent re-elected.	▌ ✓ William G. Brown Jr. (Democratic) 47.51%; ▌George M. Bowers (Republican) 44.38%; ▌Noah G. Keim (Progressive) 3.94%; ▌Edgar L. Smith (Socialist) 3.55%; ▌Fred Thompson (Prohibition) 0.61%
West Virginia 3	Samuel B. Avis	Republican	1912	Incumbent lost re-election. Democratic gain.	▌ ✓ Adam B. Littlepage (Democratic) 45.14%; ▌Samuel B. Avis (Republican) 44.25%; ▌H. F. Link (Socialist) 9.83%; ▌W. A. Howard (Prohibition) 0.78%
West Virginia 4	Hunter H. Moss Jr.	Republican	1912	Incumbent re-elected.	▌ ✓ Hunter H. Moss Jr. (Republican) 48.91%; ▌John M. Hamilton (Democratic) 46.71%; ▌Charles D. Elliott (Progressive) 3.06%; Others: ▌E. L. Benton (Socialist) 0.76%; ▌Christian A. Wernecke (Prohibition) 0.56%
West Virginia 5	James A. Hughes	Republican	1900	Incumbent retired. Republican hold.	▌ ✓ Edward Cooper (Republican) 49.54%; ▌George S. Neal (Democratic) 43.99%; ▌H. F. Leggett (Progressive) 3.30%; ▌G. W. Gillespie (Socialist) 3.13%; ▌J. M. Wysor (Prohibition) 0.05%
West Virginia at-large	Howard Sutherland	Republican	1912	Incumbent re-elected.	▌ ✓ Howard Sutherland (Republican) 46.96%; ▌Thomas F. Hodges (Democratic) 43.43%; ▌Edward H. Kintzer (Socialist) 5.08%; ▌Charles J. Schuck (Progressive) 3.71%; ▌Orillas G. White (Prohibition) 0.82%

== Wisconsin ==
Wisconsin elected eleven members of congress on Election Day, November 3, 1914.

District	Incumbent			This race	
District	Member	Party	First elected	Results	Candidates
Wisconsin 1	Henry Allen Cooper	Republican	1892	Incumbent re-elected.	▌ ✓ Henry Allen Cooper (Republican) 58.2%; ▌Calvin Stewart (Democratic) 34.9%; ▌John P. Fennell (Social Dem.) 3.8%; ▌Truman Parker (Prohibition) 3.2%
Wisconsin 2	Michael E. Burke	Democratic	1910	Incumbent re-elected.	▌ ✓ Michael E. Burke (Democratic) 52.2%; ▌Edward Voigt (Republican) 43.7%; ▌John Bauerfeind (Social Dem.) 2.9%; ▌William F. Mack (Prohibition) 1.2%
Wisconsin 3	John M. Nelson	Republican	1906^{(special)}	Incumbent re-elected.	▌ ✓ John M. Nelson (Republican) 54.8%; ▌W. F. Pierstorff (Democratic) 41.4%; ▌Herbert J. Noyes (Prohibition) 3.8%
Wisconsin 4	William J. Cary	Republican	1906	Incumbent re-elected.	▌ ✓ William J. Cary (Republican) 36.5%; ▌Winfield Gaylord (Social Dem.) 35.1%; ▌Francis A. Cannon (Democratic) 27.6%; ▌C. H. Mott (Prohibition) 0.9%
Wisconsin 5	William H. Stafford	Republican	1902	Incumbent re-elected.	▌ ✓ William H. Stafford (Republican) 46.7%; ▌Victor L. Berger (Social Dem.) 34.9%; ▌Lawrence McGreal (Democratic) 17.9%; ▌William R. Nethercut (Prohibition) 0.6%
Wisconsin 6	Michael K. Reilly	Democratic	1912	Incumbent re-elected.	▌ ✓ Michael K. Reilly (Democratic) 49.5%; ▌James H. Davidson (Republican) 45.9%; ▌Martin Georgenson (Social Dem.) 3.3%; ▌Verner N. Weeks (Prohibition) 1.3%
Wisconsin 7	John J. Esch	Republican	1898	Incumbent re-elected.	▌ ✓ John J. Esch (Republican) 63.5%; ▌Virgil H. Cady (Democratic) 31.8%; ▌Martin Larson (Prohibition) 2.8%; ▌Carl A. Noetzelman (Social Dem.) 1.9%
Wisconsin 8	Edward E. Browne	Republican	1912	Incumbent re-elected.	▌ ✓ Edward E. Browne (Republican) 55.5%; ▌Albert C. Schmidt (Democratic) 39.5%; ▌Curtis R. Boorman (Social Dem.) 3.2%; ▌Adolph R. Buckman (Prohibition) 1.8%
Wisconsin 9	Thomas F. Konop	Democratic	1906	Incumbent re-elected.	▌ ✓ Thomas F. Konop (Democratic) 51.3%; ▌John W. Reynolds Sr. (Republican) 44.9%; ▌Thomas J. Oliver (Social Dem.) 3.8%
Wisconsin 10	James A. Frear	Republican	1912	Incumbent re-elected.	▌ ✓ James A. Frear (Republican) 60.9%; ▌Andrew Sutherland (Democratic) 33.4%; ▌John Waldal (Prohibition) 3.3%; ▌Henry Haefner (Social Dem.) 2.4%
Wisconsin 11	Irvine Lenroot	Republican	1908	Incumbent re-elected.	▌ ✓ Irvine Lenroot (Republican) 65.3%; ▌John L. Molone (Democratic) 27.8%; ▌Otto F. Eick (Social Dem.) 6.5%; ▌Edward Kerswill (Prohibition) 0.3%

== Wyoming ==
District	Incumbent			This race	
District	Member	Party	First elected	Results	Candidates
Wyoming at-large	Frank W. Mondell	Republican	1898	Incumbent re-elected.	▌ ✓ Frank W. Mondell (Republican) 51.34%; ▌Douglas A. Preston (Democratic) 41.45%; ▌Anthony Carlson (Socialist) 4.07%; ▌F. H. Blume (Prohibition) 3.14%

== Non-voting delegates ==
=== Alaska Territory ===
Starting with this election, Alaska Territory elected its non-voting delegate on the same day as the rest of the states' general elections. Incumbent James Wickersham, after serving one term as a Progressive, returned to the Republican Party.

District	Incumbent			This race	
District	Delegate	Party	First elected	Results	Candidates
Alaska Territory at-large	James Wickersham	Progressive	1908	Incumbent re-elected as a Republican. Republican gain.	▌ ✓ James Wickersham (Republican); [data missing]

== See also ==
- 1914 United States elections
  - 1914 United States Senate elections
- 63rd United States Congress
- 64th United States Congress

== Bibliography ==
- Dubin, Michael J. (March 1, 1998). 1788 United States Congressional Elections-1997: The Official Results of the Elections of the 1st Through 105th Congresses. McFarland and Company. ISBN 978-0786402830.
- Martis, Kenneth C. (January 1, 1989). The Historical Atlas of Political Parties in the United States Congress, 1789-1989. Macmillan Publishing Company. ISBN 978-0029201701.
- Moore, John L., ed. (1994). Congressional Quarterly's Guide to U.S. Elections (Third ed.). Congressional Quarterly Inc. ISBN 978-0871879967.
- "Party Divisions of the House of Representatives, 1789–Present". Office of the Historian, House of United States House of Representatives.
- Secretary of State (1914). Maryland Manual 1914-15. Annapolis: The Advertiser-Republican.
