= 1905 United States House of Representatives elections =

There were several special elections to the United States House of Representatives in 1905 during the 59th United States Congress. There were no 1905 elections to the 58th United States Congress.

== 59th Congress ==
District	Incumbent			This race	
District	Member	Party	First elected	Results	Candidates
Indiana 1	James A. Hemenway	Republican	1894	Incumbent member-elect resigned during previous congress. New member elected May 16, 1905. Republican hold.	▌ ✓ John H. Foster (Republican) 70%; ▌ Major G. V. Menzies (Democratic) 30%
Nebraska 1	Elmer Burkett	Republican	1898	Incumbent member-elect resigned March 4, 1905, after being elected to the U.S. Senate. New member elected July 18, 1905. Republican hold.	▌ ✓ Ernest M. Pollard (Republican); ▌Elected to finish Burkett's term
West Virginia 2	Alston G. Dayton	Republican	1894	Incumbent resigned March 16, 1905, after being appointed judge for the U.S. District Court for the Northern District of West Virginia. New member elected June 6, 1905. Democratic gain.	▌ ✓ Thomas B. Davis (Democratic) 50.26%; ▌James S. Lakin (Republican) 47.79%; ▌W. F. Reynolds (Prohibition) 1.95%
Texas 8	John M. Pinckney	Democratic	1903 (special)	Incumbent was assassinated April 24, 1905. New member elected June 6, 1905. Democratic hold.	▌ ✓ John M. Moore (Democratic); [data missing]
Connecticut 3	Frank B. Brandegee	Republican	1902 (special)	Incumbent resigned May 10, 1905, after being elected to the U.S. Senate. New member elected October 2, 1905. Republican hold.	▌ ✓ Edwin W. Higgins (Republican)
Illinois 14	Benjamin F. Marsh	Republican	1876; 1882 (lost); 1892; 1900 (lost); 1902	Incumbent died June 2, 1905. New member elected November 7, 1905. Republican hold.	▌ ✓ James McKinney (Republican) 57.19%; ▌James Howard Pattee (Republican) 33.86%; ▌Homer L. Darby (Socialist) 5.44%; ▌J. Marion Fort (Prohibition) 3.50%
