= 1906 United States House of Representatives elections =

House elections for the 60th U.S. Congress

- November 6, 1906 (Note: Three states held early elections between June 4 and September 10.)

All 391 seats in the United States House of Representatives (Note: Including Oklahoma's late elections in 1907.) 196 seats needed for a majority
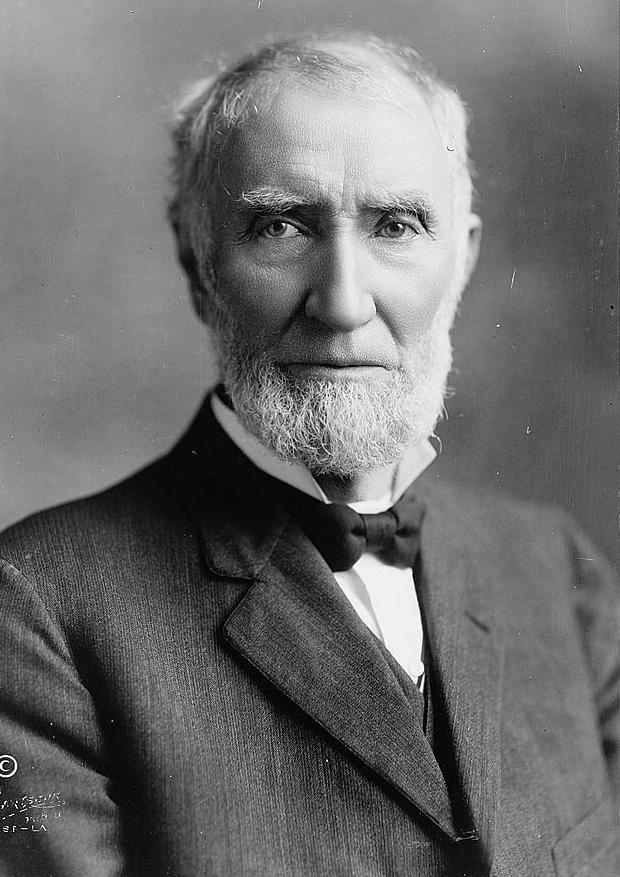

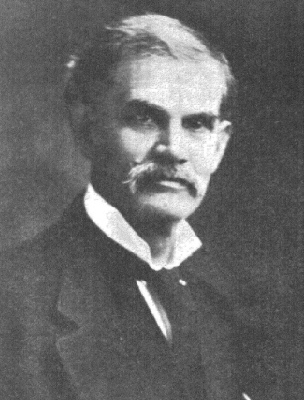
	Majority party	Minority party
Leader	Joseph Cannon	John Sharp Williams
Party	Republican	Democratic
Leader's seat	Illinois 18th	Mississippi 8th
Last election	251 seats	135 seats
Seats won	223	167
Seat change	▼28	▲32
Popular vote	5,695,735	4,866,899
Percentage	50.99%	43.57%
Swing	▼3.59pp	▲2.59pp
	Third party
Party	Independent
Last election	0 seats
Seats won	1 (Note: 1 Independent Republican, Peter A. Porter, elected to NY-34.)
Seat change	▲1
Popular vote	40,264
Percentage	0.36%
Swing	▲0.20pp
- Results: Democratic gain Republican gain Democratic hold Republican hold Independent gain
Speaker before election
Joseph Cannon
Republican
Elected Speaker
Joseph Cannon
Republican

The 1906 United States House of Representatives elections were held for the most part on November 6, 1906, with Oregon, Maine, and Vermont holding theirs early in either June or September. They occurred in the middle of President Theodore Roosevelt's second term. Elections were held for 386 seats of the United States House of Representatives, representing 45 states, to serve in the 60th United States Congress (Oklahoma would later gain statehood in 1907 and increase the House membership to 391).

As in many midterm elections, the President's Republican Party lost seats to the opposition Democratic Party, but retained a large overall majority. Dissatisfaction with working conditions and resentment toward union busting among industrial laborers in the Mid-Atlantic and Midwest caused these groups to turn out to the polls in large numbers in support of the Democratic Party. However, gains in these regions were not enough to remove the Republican majority or the firm support that the party held among the middle class.

== Special elections ==
District	Incumbent			Results	Candidates
District	Senator	Party	First elected	Results	Candidates
Alaska Territory at-large	None (new seat)			New seat. New delegate elected August 14, 1906 to finish the current term. Democratic gain. Successor did not run for election to the next term; see below.	▌ ✓ Frank Hinman Waskey (Democratic); [data missing]
California 1	James Gillett	Republican	1902	Incumbent resigned. New member elected November 6, 1906. Republican hold.	▌ ✓ William F. Englebright (Republican); [data missing]
Georgia 1	Rufus E. Lester	Democratic	1888	Incumbent died. New member elected November 6, 1906. Democratic hold.	▌ ✓ James W. Overstreet (Democratic); [data missing]
Illinois 13	Robert R. Hitt	Republican	1882	Incumbent died September 20, 1906. New member elected November 6, 1906. Republican hold.	▌ ✓ Frank O. Lowden (Republican); [data missing]
Indiana 12	Newton W. Gilbert	Republican	1904	Incumbent resigned November 6, 1906, after being appointed judge of the court of first instance at Manila, Philippines. New member elected November 6, 1906. Republican hold.	▌ ✓ Clarence C. Gilhams (Republican); [data missing]
New York 8	Timothy Sullivan	Democratic	1902	Incumbent resigned July 27, 1906. New member elected November 6, 1906. Republican hold.	▌ ✓ Daniel J. Riordan (Democratic); [data missing]
Pennsylvania 2	Robert Adams Jr.	Republican	1893	Incumbent died June 1, 1906. New member elected November 6, 1906. Republican hold.	▌ ✓ John E. Reyburn (Republican); [data missing]
Pennsylvania 3	George A. Castor	Republican	1903	Incumbent died February 19, 1906. New member elected November 6, 1906. Republican hold.	▌ ✓ J. Hampton Moore (Republican); [data missing]
Pennsylvania 12	George R. Patterson	Republican	1900	Incumbent died March 21, 1906. New member elected November 6, 1906. Republican hold.	▌ ✓ Charles N. Brumm (Republican); [data missing]
Virginia 5	Claude A. Swanson	Democratic	1892	Incumbent resigned January 30, 1906, after being elected Governor of Virginia. New member elected November 6, 1906. Democratic hold.	▌ ✓ Edward W. Saunders (Democratic) 50.9%; ▌John W. Simmons (Republican) 49.1%
Wisconsin 2	Henry C. Adams	Republican	1902	Incumbent died July 9, 1906. New member elected September 4, 1906. Republican hold.	▌ ✓ John M. Nelson (Republican) 60.9%; ▌Grant Thomas (Primary Republican) 22.3%; ▌Alvin L. Heim (Socialist) 11.8%; ▌Albert C. DeForest (Prohibition) 5.0%
Massachusetts 3	Rockwood Hoar	Republican	1904	Incumbent died November 1, 1906. New member elected December 18, 1906. Republican hold.	▌ ✓ Charles G. Washburn (Republican); [data missing]

== Election summaries ==
↓
167	1	223
Democratic	(Note: There was 1 Independent Republican.)	Republican

State	Type	Total seats	Democratic		Republican	
State	Type	Total seats	Seats	Change	Seats	Change
Alabama	District	9	9	Steady	0	Steady
Arkansas	District	7	7	Steady	0	Steady
California	District	8	0	Steady	8	Steady
Colorado	District +at-large	3	0	Steady	3	Steady
Connecticut	District +at-large	5	0	Steady	5	Steady
Delaware	At-large	1	0	Steady	1	Steady
Florida	District	3	3	Steady	0	Steady
Georgia	District	11	11	Steady	0	Steady
Idaho	At-large	1	0	Steady	1	Steady
Illinois	District	25	5	▲4	20	▼4
Indiana	District	13	4	▲2	9	▼2
Iowa	District	11	1	▲1	10	▼1
Kansas	District (Note: At-large district eliminated in redistricting.)	8	0	Steady	8	Steady
Kentucky	District	11	7	▼2	4	▲2
Louisiana	District	7	7	Steady	0	Steady
Maine (Note: Elections held early.)	District	4	0	Steady	4	Steady
Maryland	District	6	3	Steady	3	Steady
Massachusetts	District	14	3	Steady	11	Steady
Michigan	District	12	0	Steady	12	Steady
Minnesota	District	9	1	▲1	8	▼1
Mississippi	District	8	8	Steady	0	Steady
Missouri	District	16	12	▲5	4	▼5
Montana	At-large	1	0	Steady	1	Steady
Nebraska	District	6	1	▲1	5	▼1
Nevada	At-large	1	1	Steady	0	Steady
New Hampshire	District	2	0	Steady	2	Steady
New Jersey	District	10	4	▲3	6	▼3
New York	District	37	11	Steady	26	Steady
North Carolina	District	10	10	▲1	0	▼1
North Dakota	District	2	0	Steady	2	Steady
Ohio	District	21	5	▲4	16	▼4
Oregon	District	2	0	Steady	2	Steady
Pennsylvania	District	32	7	▲6	25	▼6
Rhode Island	District	2	1	Steady	1	Steady
South Carolina	District	7	7	Steady	0	Steady
South Dakota	At-large	2	0	Steady	2	Steady
Tennessee	District	10	8	Steady	2	Steady
Texas	District	16	16	Steady	0	Steady
Utah	At-large	1	0	Steady	1	Steady
Vermont	District	2	0	Steady	2	Steady
Virginia	District	10	9	Steady	1	Steady
Washington	At-large	3	0	Steady	3	Steady
West Virginia	District	5	0	Steady	5	Steady
Wisconsin	District	11	2	▲1	9	▼1
Wyoming	At-large	1	0	Steady	1	Steady
Total		386	167 42.2%	▲27	223 57.8%	▼27

Popular vote
Republican	50.99%
Democratic	43.57%
Independent	0.36%
Others	5.08%

House seats
Republican	57.03%
Democratic	42.71%
Independent	0.26%

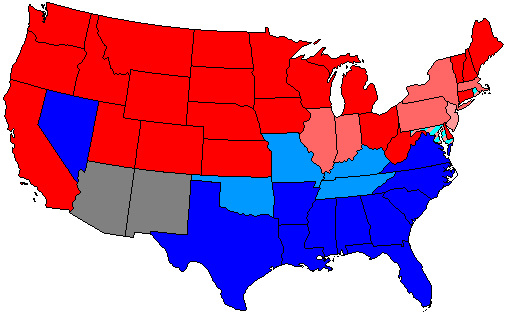
House seats by party holding plurality in state Including Oklahoma, which was admitted in 1907.: 80+% Democratic / 80+% Republican; 60+% to 80% Democratic / 60+% to 80% Republican; Up to 60% Democratic / Up to 60% Republican

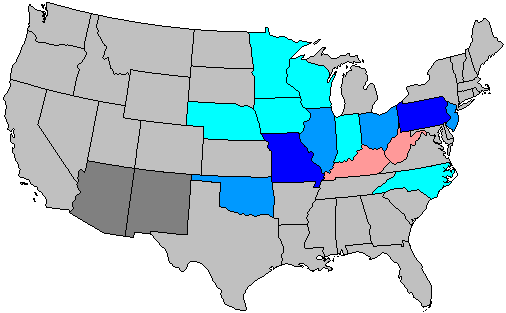
Net gain in party representation Including Oklahoma, which was admitted in 1907.: 6+ Democratic gain / 6+ Republican gain; 3–5 Democratic gain / 3–5 Republican gain; 1–2 Democratic gain / 1–2 Republican gain; no net change

== Election dates ==
In 1906, three states, with 8 seats among them, held elections early:

- June 4 Oregon
- September 4 Vermont
- September 10 Maine

Oklahoma was admitted in 1907 and held its first congressional elections on September 17, 1907.

== Alabama ==
District	Incumbent			This race	
District	Member	Party	First elected	Results	Candidates
Alabama 1	George W. Taylor	Democratic	1896	Incumbent re-elected.	▌ ✓ George W. Taylor (Democratic) 100%
Alabama 2	Ariosto A. Wiley	Democratic	1900	Incumbent re-elected.	▌ ✓ Ariosto A. Wiley (Democratic) 88.9%; ▌ J. C. Fonville (Republican) 11.1%
Alabama 3	Henry D. Clayton Jr.	Democratic	1896	Incumbent re-elected.	▌ ✓ Henry D. Clayton Jr. (Democratic) 100%
Alabama 4	Sydney J. Bowie	Democratic	1900	Incumbent retired. Democratic hold.	▌ ✓ William Benjamin Craig (Democratic) 100%
Alabama 5	J. Thomas Heflin	Democratic	1904	Incumbent re-elected.	▌ ✓ J. Thomas Heflin (Democratic) 100%
Alabama 6	John H. Bankhead	Democratic	1886	Incumbent lost renomination. Democratic hold.	▌ ✓ Richmond P. Hobson (Democratic) 100%
Alabama 7	John L. Burnett	Democratic	1898	Incumbent re-elected.	▌ ✓ John L. Burnett (Democratic) 62.7%; ▌ Charles Brents Kennamer (Republican) 37.3%
Alabama 8	William Richardson	Democratic	1900	Incumbent re-elected.	▌ ✓ William Richardson (Democratic) 94.9%; ▌ John T. Masterson (Republican) 5.1%
Alabama 9	Oscar Underwood	Democratic	1894	Incumbent re-elected.	▌ ✓ Oscar Underwood (Democratic) 100%

== Arkansas ==
District	Incumbent			This race	
District	Member	Party	First elected	Results	Candidates
Arkansas 1	Robert B. Macon	Democratic	1902	Incumbent re-elected.	▌ ✓ Robert B. Macon (Democratic) 82.2%; ▌ D. F. Taylor (Republican) 17.8%
Arkansas 2	Stephen Brundidge Jr.	Democratic	1896	Incumbent re-elected.	▌ ✓ Stephen Brundidge Jr. (Democratic) 80.9%; ▌ E. J. Mason (Republican) 19.1%
Arkansas 3	John C. Floyd	Democratic	1904	Incumbent re-elected.	▌ ✓ John C. Floyd (Democratic) 63.8%; ▌ W. N. Ivie (Republican) 36.2%
Arkansas 4	John S. Little	Democratic	1894	Incumbent retired to run for Governor of Arkansas. Democratic hold.	▌ ✓ William B. Cravens (Democratic) 65.5%; ▌ George Tilles Sr. (Republican) 34.5%
Arkansas 5	Charles C. Reid	Democratic	1900	Incumbent re-elected.	▌ ✓ Charles C. Reid (Democratic) 75.1%; ▌ Alonzo Hedges (Republican) 24.9%
Arkansas 6	Joseph T. Robinson	Democratic	1902	Incumbent re-elected.	▌ ✓ Joseph T. Robinson (Democratic) 84.4%; ▌ R. C. Thompson (Republican) 15.6%
Arkansas 7	Robert M. Wallace	Democratic	1902	Incumbent re-elected.	▌ ✓ Robert M. Wallace (Democratic) 99.1%

== California ==
District	Incumbent			This race	
District	Member	Party	First elected	Results	Candidates
California 1	James Gillett	Republican	1902	Incumbent retired to run for Governor of California. Republican hold.	▌ ✓ William F. Englebright (Republican) 54.1%; ▌F. W. Taft (Democratic) 39.9%; ▌J. C. Weybright (Socialist) 5%; ▌R. L. Webb (Prohibition) 1.1%
California 2	Duncan E. McKinlay	Republican	1904	Incumbent re-elected.	▌ ✓ Duncan E. McKinlay (Republican) 51.8%; ▌W. A. Beard (Democratic) 44.8%; ▌A. J. Gaylord (Socialist) 3.4%
California 3	Joseph R. Knowland	Republican	1904	Incumbent re-elected.	▌ ✓ Joseph R. Knowland (Republican) 60%; ▌Hugh W. Brunk (Democratic) 21.5%; ▌Charles C. Boynton (Independence) 10.1%; ▌William McDevitt (Socialist) 7%; ▌Thomas H. Montgomery (Prohibition) 1.3%
California 4	Julius Kahn	Republican	1898	Incumbent re-elected.	▌ ✓ Julius Kahn (Republican) 62.4%; ▌David S. Hirshberg (Democratic) 33.2%; ▌Oliver Everett (Socialist) 4.4%
California 5	Everis A. Hayes	Republican	1904	Incumbent re-elected.	▌ ✓ Everis A. Hayes (Republican) 52.6%; ▌Hiram G. Davis (Democratic) 41.9%; ▌Joseph Lawrence (Socialist) 5.5%
California 6	James C. Needham	Republican	1898	Incumbent re-elected.	▌ ✓ James C. Needham (Republican) 55.6%; ▌Harry A. Greene (Democratic) 37.8%; ▌Richard Kirk (Socialist) 3.8%; ▌Herman E. Burbank (Prohibition) 2.8%
California 7	James McLachlan	Republican	1900	Incumbent re-elected.	▌ ✓ James McLachlan (Republican) 56.8%; ▌Robert G. Laucks (Democratic) 28.4%; ▌Charles Ribble (Socialist) 9.3%; ▌Levi D. Johnson (Prohibition) 5.6%
California 8	Sylvester C. Smith	Republican	1904	Incumbent re-elected.	▌ ✓ Sylvester C. Smith (Republican) 55.6%; ▌Charles A. Barlow (Democratic) 34.5%; ▌Noble A. Richardson (Socialist) 9.9%

== Colorado ==
District	Incumbent			This race	
District	Member	Party	First elected	Results	Candidates
Colorado 1	Robert W. Bonynge	Republican	1902 (contest)	Incumbent re-elected.	▌ ✓ Robert W. Bonynge (Republican) 55.5%; ▌Charles F. Tew (Democratic) 36.3%; ▌Luella Twining (Socialist) 5.8%; ▌E. E. Evans (Prohibition) 2.4%
Colorado 2	Herschel M. Hogg	Republican	1902	Incumbent retired. Republican hold.	▌ ✓ Warren A. Haggott (Republican) 52.0%; ▌William W. Rowan (Democratic) 44.7%; ▌Flavius E. Ashburn (Socialist) 6.9%; ▌H. B. King (Prohibition) 1.7%
Colorado at-large	Franklin E. Brooks	Republican	1902	Incumbent retired. Republican hold.	▌ ✓ George W. Cook (Republican) 52.2%; ▌Samuel W. Belford (Democratic) 39.1%; ▌Guy E. Miller (Socialist) 6.5%; ▌Joseph W. Andrew (Prohibition) 2.2%

== Connecticut ==
District	Incumbent			This race	
District	Member	Party	First elected	Results	Candidates
Connecticut 1	E. Stevens Henry	Republican	1894	Incumbent re-elected.	▌ ✓ E. Stevens Henry (Republican) 55.4%; ▌Benedict M. Holden (Democratic) 38.5%; Others: ▌August Beutter (Socialist) 1.9%; ▌Walter S. MacIntire (Prohibition) 1.4%; ▌Jacob Kumpitch (Soc. Labor) 0.2%
Connecticut 2	Nehemiah D. Sperry	Republican	1894	Incumbent re-elected.	▌ ✓ Nehemiah D. Sperry (Republican) 52.5%; ▌George M. Wallace (Democratic) 42.9%; ▌Arsene Babin (Socialist) 2.8%; Others: ▌Charles Wissert (Prohibition) 0.6%; ▌Charles G. Sundberg (Soc. Labor) 0.1%
Connecticut 3	Edwin W. Higgins	Republican	1905 (special)	Incumbent re-elected.	▌ ✓ Edwin W. Higgins (Republican) 57.3%; ▌Amer La Rue (Democratic) 40.9%; Others: ▌James I. Bartholomew (Prohibition) 1.1%; ▌Charles E. Sheldon (Socialist) 0.5%; ▌Amedie B. Lafreniere (Soc. Labor) 0.2%
Connecticut 4	Ebenezer J. Hill	Republican	1894	Incumbent re-elected.	▌ ✓ Ebenezer J. Hill (Republican) 57.0%; ▌Homer S. Beers (Democratic) 40.8%; Others: ▌Harry G. Manchester (Prohibition) 1.0%; ▌Charles T. Peach (Socialist) 1.0%; ▌John C. Custer (Soc. Labor) 0.1%
Connecticut at-large	George L. Lilley	Republican	1904	Incumbent re-elected.	▌ ✓ George L. Lilley (Republican) 54.8%; ▌Charles J. Donahue (Democratic) 42.1%; Others: ▌Burton E. Leavitt (Socialist) 1.8%; ▌Duane N. Griffin (Prohibition) 1.1%; ▌Alfred Johnson (Soc. Labor) 0.2%

== Delaware ==
District	Incumbent			This race	
District	Member	Party	First elected	Results	Candidates
Delaware at-large	Hiram R. Burton	Republican	1904	Incumbent re-elected.	▌ ✓ Hiram R. Burton (Republican) 52.8%; ▌ David T. Marvel (Democratic) 44.8%; ▌ Alfred Smith (Prohibition) 2.0%; ▌ F. A. Houck (Socialist) 0.4%

== Florida ==
District	Incumbent	Party	First elected	Result	Candidates
Florida 1	Stephen M. Sparkman	Democratic	1894	Incumbent re-elected.	▌ ✓ Stephen M. Sparkman (Democratic) 86.5%; ▌C. C. Allen (Socialist) 13.5%
Florida 2	Frank Clark	Democratic	1904	Incumbent re-elected.	▌ ✓ Frank Clark (Democratic) 88.2%; ▌J. F. McClelland (Socialist) 11.8%
Florida 3	William B. Lamar	Democratic	1902	Incumbent re-elected.	▌ ✓ William B. Lamar (Democratic) 93.4%; ▌T. B. Meeker (Socialist) 6.6%

== Georgia ==
District	Incumbent			This race	
District	Member	Party	First elected	Results	Candidates
Georgia 1	James W. Overstreet	Democratic	1906	Incumbent retired. Democratic hold.	▌ ✓ Charles G. Edwards (Democratic) 92.1%; ▌ D. B. Rigdon (Republican) 8.0%
Georgia 2	James M. Griggs	Democratic	1896	Incumbent re-elected.	▌ ✓ James M. Griggs (Democratic) 100%
Georgia 3	Elijah B. Lewis	Democratic	1896	Incumbent re-elected.	▌ ✓ Elijah B. Lewis (Democratic) 100%
Georgia 4	William C. Adamson	Democratic	1896	Incumbent re-elected.	▌ ✓ William C. Adamson (Democratic) 100%
Georgia 5	Leonidas F. Livingston	Democratic	1890	Incumbent re-elected.	▌ ✓ Leonidas F. Livingston (Democratic) 100%
Georgia 6	Charles L. Bartlett	Democratic	1894	Incumbent re-elected.	▌ ✓ Charles L. Bartlett (Democratic) 100%
Georgia 7	Gordon Lee	Democratic	1904	Incumbent re-elected.	▌ ✓ Gordon Lee (Democratic) 100%
Georgia 8	William M. Howard	Democratic	1896	Incumbent re-elected.	▌ ✓ William M. Howard (Democratic) 100%
Georgia 9	Thomas M. Bell	Democratic	1904	Incumbent re-elected.	▌ ✓ Thomas M. Bell (Democratic) 100%
Georgia 10	Thomas W. Hardwick	Democratic	1902	Incumbent re-elected.	▌ ✓ Thomas W. Hardwick (Democratic) 99.8%
Georgia 11	William G. Brantley	Democratic	1896	Incumbent re-elected.	▌ ✓ William G. Brantley (Democratic) 100%

== Idaho ==
District	Incumbent			This race	
District	Member	Party	First elected	Results	Candidates
Idaho at-large	Burton L. French	Republican	1902	Incumbent re-elected.	▌ ✓ Burton L. French (Republican) 58.59%; ▌Murray R. Hattabaugh (Democratic) 33.12%; ▌Edward L. Rigg (Socialist) 6.72%; ▌Charles A. Montandon (Prohibition) 1.57%

== Illinois ==
District	Incumbent			This race	
District	Member	Party	First elected	Results	Candidates
Illinois 1	Martin B. Madden	Republican	1904	Incumbent re-elected.	▌ ✓ Martin B. Madden (Republican) 59.3%; ▌ Martin Emerich (Democratic) 34.9%; ▌ J. H. Greer (Socialist) 4.9%; ▌ Amasa Orelup (Prohibition) 0.9%
Illinois 2	James Robert Mann	Republican	1896	Incumbent re-elected.	▌ ✓ James Robert Mann (Republican) 63.4%; ▌ Herbert J. Friedamn (Democratic) 26.3%; ▌ Bernard Berlyn (Socialist) 9.3%; ▌ Peter J. Peterson (Independent) 1.0%
Illinois 3	William Warfield Wilson	Republican	1902	Incumbent re-elected.	▌ ✓ William Warfield Wilson (Republican) 49.7%; ▌ Paul A. Dratz (Democratic) 23.1%; ▌ Willis C. Stone (Independence) 16.8%; ▌ James A. Prout (Socialist) 8.6%; ▌ Levi T. Regan (Prohibition) 1.8%
Illinois 4	Charles S. Wharton	Republican	1904	Incumbent lost re-election. Democratic gain.	▌ ✓ James T. McDermott (Democratic) 46.7%; ▌ Charles S. Wharton (Republican) 39.1%; ▌ James McCarthy (Socialist) 13.3%; ▌ James R. Clegg (Prohibition) 0.9%
Illinois 5	Anthony Michalek	Republican	1904	Incumbent lost re-election. Democratic gain.	▌ ✓ Adolph J. Sabath (Democratic) 46.1%; ▌ Anthony Michalek (Republican) 41.7%; ▌ Joseph Kral (Socialist) 11.5%; ▌ Carl C. Graff (Prohibition) 0.7%
Illinois 6	William Lorimer	Republican	1902	Incumbent re-elected.	▌ ✓ William Lorimer (Republican) 55.4%; ▌ Edmund J. Stack (Democratic) 32.8%; ▌ Walter F. Huggins (Socialist) 6.4%; ▌ Edward E. Blake (Prohibition) 5.5%
Illinois 7	Philip Knopf	Republican	1902	Incumbent re-elected	▌ ✓ Philip Knopf (Republican) 51.3%; ▌ Frank Buchanan (Democratic) 31.4%; ▌ George Koop (Socialist) 15.4%; ▌ E. H. Parkinson (Prohibition) 1.9%
Illinois 8	Charles McGavin	Republican	1904	Incumbent re-elected.	▌ ✓ Charles McGavin (Republican) 40.0%; ▌ Stanley H. Kunz (Democratic) 39.7%; ▌ Abraham Priess (Independence) 11.0%; ▌ James B. Smiley (Socialist) 9.3%
Illinois 9	Henry Sherman Boutell	Republican	1897	Incumbent re-elected.	▌ ✓ Henry Sherman Boutell (Republican) 50.6%; ▌ Arthur J. Donoghue (Democratic) 28.1%; ▌ John M. Vail (Independence) 11.9%; ▌ Charles L. Breckon (Socialist) 8.6%; ▌ William A. Aldrich (Prohibition) 0.8%
Illinois 10	George E. Foss	Republican	1894	Incumbent re-elected.	▌ ✓ George E. Foss (Republican) 62.7%; ▌ Charles L. Young (Democratic) 25.2%; ▌ Lewis W. Hardy (Socialist) 9.2%; ▌ Malcolm C. Harper (Prohibition) 2.9%
Illinois 11	Howard M. Snapp	Republican	1902	Incumbent re-elected.	▌ ✓ Howard M. Snapp (Republican) 60.7%; ▌ Benjamin P. Alschuler (Democratic) 29.8%; ▌ George McGinnis (Prohibition) 7.2%; ▌ James H. Brower (Socialist) 2.3%
Illinois 12	Charles Eugene Fuller	Republican	1902	Incumbent re-elected.	▌ ✓ Charles Eugene Fuller (Republican) 86.9%; ▌ Victor Irving Clark (Prohibition) 7.6%; ▌ A. A. Patterson (Socialist) 5.5%
Illinois 13	Robert R. Hitt	Republican	1882	Incumbent died. Winner also elected to finish term. Republican hold.	▌ ✓ Frank O. Lowden (Republican) 51.2%; ▌ James P. Wilson (Democratic) 45.5%; ▌ Charles L. Logan (Prohibition) 2.5%; ▌ E. I. Rubendall (Socialist Labor) 0.8%
Illinois 14	James McKinney	Republican	1905	Incumbent re-elected.	▌ ✓ James McKinney (Republican) 54.7%; ▌ David W. Matthews (Democratic) 38.2%; ▌ James M. Elam (Prohibition) 3.6%; ▌ John C. Gibson (Socialist) 3.1%; ▌ Allen H. Mertz (Independent) 0.4%
Illinois 15	George W. Prince	Republican	1895	Incumbent re-elected.	▌ ✓ George W. Prince (Republican) 54.2%; ▌ Hiram N. Wheeler (Democratic) 38.5%; ▌ R. V. Meigs (Prohibition) 4.6%; ▌ Sam Jessup (Socialist) 2.7%
Illinois 16	Joseph V. Graff	Republican	1894	Incumbent re-elected.	▌ ✓ Joseph V. Graff (Republican) 50.3%; ▌ Louis F. Meek (Democratic) 41.1%; ▌ C. E. Stebbins (Prohibition) 5.8%; ▌ Rudolf Pfeiffer (Socialist) 2.8%
Illinois 17	John A. Sterling	Republican	1902	Incumbent re-elected.	▌ ✓ John A. Sterling (Republican) 55.8%; ▌ L. W. MacNeil (Democratic) 37.8%; ▌ James H. Burrows (Prohibition) 6.4%
Illinois 18	Joseph Gurney Cannon	Republican	1892	Incumbent re-elected.	▌ ✓ Joseph Gurney Cannon (Republican) 58.4%; ▌ Charles G. Taylor (Democratic) 32.7%; ▌ Ernest G. Shouse (Prohibition) 4.9%; ▌ John H. Walker (Socialist) 4.0%
Illinois 19	William B. McKinley	Republican	1904	Incumbent re-elected.	▌ ✓ William B. McKinley (Republican) 52.7%; ▌ John W. Yantis (Democratic) 42.9%; ▌ James L. Thompson (Prohibition) 4.4%
Illinois 20	Henry T. Rainey	Democratic	1902	Incumbent re-elected.	▌ ✓ Henry T. Rainey (Democratic) 54.9%; ▌ Jacob G. Pope (Republican) 41.1%; ▌ Jay J. Dugan (Prohibition) 3.1%; ▌ Thomas A. Wakely (Socialist) 0.9%
Illinois 21	Zeno J. Rives	Republican	1904	Incumbent lost re-election. Democratic gain.	▌ ✓ Ben F. Caldwell (Democratic) 53.5%; ▌ Zeno J. Rives (Republican) 41.5%; ▌ Samuel K. Wheatlake (Prohibition) 3.2%; ▌ John Poppinghaus (Socialist) 1.8%
Illinois 22	William A. Rodenberg	Republican	1902	Incumbent re-elected.	▌ ✓ William A. Rodenberg (Republican) 56.2%; ▌ James J. McInerney (Democratic) 37.3%; ▌ Thomas H. Arey (Socialist) 3.5%; ▌ Samuel D. McKenny (Prohibition) 3.0%
Illinois 23	Frank S. Dickson	Republican	1904	Incumbent lost re-election. Democratic gain.	▌ ✓ Martin D. Foster (Democratic) 49.5%; ▌ Frank S. Dickson (Republican) 46.5%; ▌ George B. Murray (Prohibition) 3.2%; ▌ F. M. Riley (Socialist) 0.8%
Illinois 24	Pleasant T. Chapman	Republican	1904	Incumbent re-elected.	▌ ✓ Pleasant T. Chapman (Republican) 51.1%; ▌ James R. Williams (Democratic) 46.2%; ▌ George R. Leach (Prohibition) 2.7%
Illinois 25	George Washington Smith	Republican	1888	Incumbent re-elected.	▌ ✓ George Washington Smith (Republican) 52.6%; ▌ James M. Joplin (Democratic) 42.0%; ▌ Robert H. Robertson (Prohibition) 4.2%; ▌ C. E. Ingraham (Socialist) 1.2%

== Indiana ==
District	Incumbent			This race	
District	Member	Party	First elected	Results	Candidates
Indiana 1	John H. Foster	Republican	1905	Incumbent re-elected.	▌ ✓ John H. Foster (Republican) 50.0%; ▌ Gustavus V. Menzies (Democratic) 46.7%; ▌ P. D. Strong (Socialist) 2.3%; ▌ Thomas H. Riggs (Prohibition) 1.5%
Indiana 2	John C. Chaney	Republican	1904	Incumbent re-elected.	▌ ✓ John C. Chaney (Republican) 48.7%; ▌ Cyrus E. Davis (Democratic) 47.8%; ▌ William H. Hill (Prohibition) 1.8%; ▌ J. E. Chinn (Socialist) 1.7%
Indiana 3	William T. Zenor	Democratic	1896	Incumbent retired. Democratic hold.	▌ ✓ William E. Cox (Democratic) 49.3%; ▌ George H. Hester (Republican) 48.1%; ▌ Theodore J. Shrode (Prohibition) 2.2%; ▌ F. L. Goodman (Socialist) 0.4%
Indiana 4	Lincoln Dixon	Democratic	1904	Incumbent re-elected.	▌ ✓ Lincoln Dixon (Democratic) 51.0%; ▌ John H. Kamman (Republican) 46.2%; ▌ Bertram N. Connelly (Prohibition) 2.3%; ▌ A. F. Bumpes (Socialist) 0.5%
Indiana 5	Elias S. Holliday	Republican	1900	Incumbent re-elected.	▌ ✓ Elias S. Holliday (Republican) 48.8%; ▌ Claude G. Bowers (Democratic) 46.8%; ▌ Willis Bond (Prohibition) 3.4%; ▌ P. K. Reinhold (Socialist) 1.6%
Indiana 6	James E. Watson	Republican	1898	Incumbent re-elected.	▌ ✓ James E. Watson (Republican) 49.5%; ▌ Thomas H. Kuhn (Democratic) 46.2%; ▌ Benjamin F. Dailey (Prohibition) 3.2%; ▌ J. M. Doddridge (Socialist) 1.1%
Indiana 7	Jesse Overstreet	Republican	1894	Incumbent re-elected.	▌ ✓ Jesse Overstreet (Republican) 52.8%; ▌ Frank E. Gavin (Democratic) 43.8%; ▌ Samuel J. Wilson (Prohibition) 2.0%; ▌ A. G. Bert (Socialist) 1.4%
Indiana 8	George W. Cromer	Republican	1898	Incumbent lost re-election. Democratic gain.	▌ ✓ John A. M. Adair (Democratic) 51.4%; ▌ George W. Cromer (Republican) 42.3%; ▌ Frank D. Muse (Prohibition) 4.3%; ▌ G. R. Gamble (Socialist) 1.9%; ▌ C. F. Bartling (Socialist Labor) 0.1%
Indiana 9	Charles B. Landis	Republican	1896	Incumbent re-elected.	▌ ✓ Charles B. Landis (Republican) 49.5%; ▌ Marion E. Clodfelter (Democratic) 44.9%; ▌ John L. Doan (Prohibition) 4.7%; ▌ G. W. Sharp (Socialist) 0.9%
Indiana 10	Edgar D. Crumpacker	Republican	1896	Incumbent re-elected.	▌ ✓ Edgar D. Crumpacker (Republican) 54.0%; ▌ William Darroch (Democratic) 43.9%; ▌ James R. Barr (Prohibition) 2.1%
Indiana 11	Frederick Landis	Republican	1902	Incumbent lost re-election. Democratic gain.	▌ ✓ George W. Rauch (Democratic) 50.2%; ▌ Frederick Landis (Republican) 43.3%; ▌ Levi T. Pennington (Prohibition) 5.2%; ▌ J. W. Kelley (Socialist) 1.3%
Indiana 12	Newton W. Gilbert	Republican	1904	Incumbent resigned. Winner also elected to finish term. Republican hold.	▌ ✓ Clarence C. Gilhams (Republican) 48.6%; ▌ John W. Morr (Democratic) 47.7%; ▌ George C. Ulmer (Prohibition) 2.6%; ▌ P. J. Kelley (Socialist) 1.1%
Indiana 13	Abraham L. Brick	Republican	1898	Incumbent re-elected.	▌ ✓ Abraham L. Brick (Republican) 48.0%; ▌ Benjamin F. Shively (Democratic) 47.5%; ▌ Isaac G. Shaw (Prohibition) 3.0%; ▌ C. R. Heath (Socialist) 1.5%

== Iowa ==
District	Incumbent			This race	
District	Member	Party	First elected	Results	Candidates
Iowa 1	Thomas Hedge	Republican	1898	Incumbent retired. Republican hold.	▌ ✓ Charles A. Kennedy (Republican) 49.1%; ▌ George S. Tracy (Democratic) 48.3%; ▌ W. N. Welton (Prohibition) 1.3%; ▌ A. S. Buttrey (Socialist) 1.3%
Iowa 2	Albert F. Dawson	Republican	1904	Incumbent re-elected.	▌ ✓ Albert F. Dawson (Republican) 50.2%; ▌ George Washington Ball (Democratic) 46.2%; ▌ M. T. Kennedy (Socialist) 3.2%; ▌ C. C. Bacon (Prohibition) 0.4%
Iowa 3	Benjamin P. Birdsall	Republican	1902	Incumbent re-elected	▌ ✓ Benjamin P. Birdsall (Republican) 57.7%; ▌ J. C. Murtagh (Democratic) 39.0%; ▌ Christian Sorenson (Socialist) 1.8%; ▌ A. MacEachron (Prohibition) 1.5%
Iowa 4	Gilbert N. Haugen	Republican	1898	Incumbent re-elected.	▌ ✓ Gilbert N. Haugen (Republican) 60.6%; ▌ M. J. Carter (Democratic) 37.2%; ▌ S. B. Finney (Prohibition) 1.2%; ▌ C. J. Thorgrinison (Socialist) 1.0%
Iowa 5	Robert G. Cousins	Republican	1892	Incumbent re-elected.	▌ ✓ Robert G. Cousins (Republican) 54.3%; ▌ Robert C. Stinton (Democratic) 41.6%; ▌ Malcolm Smith (Prohibition) 2.3%; ▌ O. L. Crowell (Socialist) 1.8%
Iowa 6	John F. Lacey	Republican	1892	Incumbent lost re-election. Democratic gain.	▌ ✓ Daniel W. Hamilton (Democratic) 51.8%; ▌ John F. Lacey (Republican) 45.6%; ▌ W. C. Minnick (Socialist) 2.5%; ▌ F. D. DeLong (Prohibition) 0.1%
Iowa 7	John A. T. Hull	Republican	1890	Incumbent re-elected.	▌ ✓ John A. T. Hull (Republican) 59.2%; ▌ John Nathan Smith (Democratic) 34.6%; ▌ J. P. Gill (Prohibition) 3.2%; ▌ J. W. Johns (Socialist) 3.0%
Iowa 8	William P. Hepburn	Republican	1892	Incumbent re-elected.	▌ ✓ William P. Hepburn (Republican) 53.0%; ▌ Joel S. Estes (Democratic) 43.7%; ▌ S. D. Mercer (Socialist) 1.7%; ▌ William Orr (Prohibition) 1.6%
Iowa 9	Walter I. Smith	Republican	1900	Incumbent re-elected.	▌ ✓ Walter I. Smith (Republican) 60.7%; ▌ William C. Campbell (Democratic) 36.8%; ▌ J. O. McElroy (Socialist) 1.3%; ▌ A. P. Macomber (Prohibition) 1.2%
Iowa 10	James P. Conner	Republican	1900	Incumbent re-elected.	▌ ✓ James P. Conner (Republican) 60.9%; ▌ John B. Butler (Democratic) 35.9%; ▌ William Beckett (Prohibition) 1.7%; ▌ N. S. Sheffield (Socialist) 1.5%
Iowa 11	Elbert H. Hubbard	Republican	1904	Incumbent re-elected.	▌ ✓ Elbert H. Hubbard (Republican) 55.9%; ▌ Charles A. Dickson (Democratic) 42.5%; ▌ A. W. Beach (Socialist) 1.6%

== Kansas ==
District	Incumbent			This race	
District	Member	Party	First elected	Results	Candidates
Kansas 1	Charles Curtis	Republican	1892	Incumbent re-elected but resigned when elected U.S. senator.	▌ ✓ Charles Curtis (Republican) 57.5%; ▌ W. D. Webb (Democratic) 40.9%; ▌ Albert Kingsley (Socialist) 1.6%
Kansas 2	Charles F. Scott; Redistricted from the at-large district	Republican	1900	Incumbent re-elected.	▌ ✓ Charles F. Scott (Republican) 53.1%; ▌ Mason S. Peters (Democratic) 44.4%; ▌ J. W. Puckett (Socialist) 1.6%; ▌ W. E. Monbeck (Prohibition) 0.9%
Kansas 2	Justin De Witt Bowersock	Republican	1898	Incumbent retired. Republican loss.	▌ ✓ Charles F. Scott (Republican) 53.1%; ▌ Mason S. Peters (Democratic) 44.4%; ▌ J. W. Puckett (Socialist) 1.6%; ▌ W. E. Monbeck (Prohibition) 0.9%
Kansas 3	Philip P. Campbell	Republican	1902	Incumbent re-elected.	▌ ✓ Philip P. Campbell (Republican) 52.5%; ▌ Francis M. Brady (Democratic) 40.5%; ▌ Fred D. Warren (Socialist) 5.9%; ▌ J. R. Roberts (Prohibition) 1.1%
Kansas 4	James Monroe Miller	Republican	1898	Incumbent re-elected.	▌ ✓ James Monroe Miller (Republican) 53.5%; ▌ J. W. Moore (Democratic) 44.0%; ▌ W. J. McMillan (Socialist) 1.3%; ▌ G. F. Bradford (Prohibition) 1.2%
Kansas 5	William A. Calderhead	Republican	1898	Incumbent re-elected.	▌ ✓ William A. Calderhead (Republican) 54.1%; ▌ Hugh Alexander (Democratic) 43.3%; ▌ G. F. Hibner (Socialist) 2.6%
Kansas 6	William A. Reeder	Republican	1898	Incumbent re-elected.	▌ ✓ William A. Reeder (Republican) 51.6%; ▌John B. Rea (Democratic) 41.6%; ▌ R. S. Thomas (Socialist) 2.4%; ▌ R. C. Smith (Prohibition) 2.3%; ▌ Harry Gray (Populist) 2.1%
Kansas 7	None (new seat)			New seat. Republican gain.	▌ ✓ Edmond H. Madison (Republican) 55.0%; ▌ O. H. Truman (Democratic) 39.8%; ▌ R. C. Webster (Socialist) 2.8%; ▌ W. C. Johnston (Prohibition) 2.4%
Kansas 8	Victor Murdock; Redistricted from the 7th district	Republican	1903	Incumbent re-elected.	▌ ✓ Victor Murdock (Republican) 56.5%; ▌ Frank B. Lawrence (Democratic) 39.6%; ▌ Frank Ayers (Socialist) 2.0%; ▌ J. J. Hill (Prohibition) 1.9%

== Kentucky ==
District	Incumbent			This race	
District	Member	Party	First elected	Results	Candidates
Kentucky 1	Ollie Murray James	Democratic	1902	Incumbent re-elected.	▌ ✓ Ollie Murray James (Democratic) 85.9%; ▌ J. D. Smith (Prohibition) 14.1%
Kentucky 2	Augustus Owsley Stanley	Democratic	1902	Incumbent re-elected.	▌ ✓ Augustus Owsley Stanley (Democratic) 61.9%; ▌ Paul M. Moore (Republican) 34.5%; ▌ Alexander Hill (Prohibition) 2.5%; ▌ Robert Roll (Socialist) 1.1%
Kentucky 3	James M. Richardson	Democratic	1904	Incumbent lost re-election. Republican gain.	▌ ✓ Addison James (Republican) 50.2%; ▌ James M. Richardson (Democratic) 47.8%; ▌ W. H. Collins (Prohibition) 2.0%
Kentucky 4	David Highbaugh Smith	Democratic	1896	Incumbent retired. Democratic hold.	▌ ✓ Ben Johnson (Democratic) 59.1%; ▌ M. L. Heavrin (Republican) 38.4%; ▌ R. H. Roe (Prohibition) 2.5%
Kentucky 5	J. Swagar Sherley	Democratic	1902	Incumbent re-elected.	▌ ✓ J. Swagar Sherley (Democratic) 54.8%; ▌ William Claiborne Owens (Republican) 42.6%; ▌ C. A. Jenson (Prohibition) 1.2%; ▌ Charles Dobbs (Socialist) 0.9%; ▌ James Doyle (Socialist Labor) 0.5%
Kentucky 6	Joseph L. Rhinock	Democratic	1904	Incumbent re-elected.	▌ ✓ Joseph L. Rhinock (Democratic) 48.3%; ▌ William F. Schuerman (Republican) 46.9%; ▌ Claude Andrews (Socialist) 3.5%; ▌ C. L. Broshaer (Prohibition) 1.3%
Kentucky 7	South Trimble	Democratic	1900	Incumbent retired to run for Lieutenant Governor of Kentucky. Democratic hold.	▌ ✓ William P. Kimball (Democratic) 74.0%; ▌ Joseph W. Calvert (Republican) 23.9%; ▌ J. W. Zachary (Prohibition) 2.1%
Kentucky 8	George G. Gilbert	Democratic	1898	Incumbent retired. Democratic hold.	▌ ✓ Harvey Helm (Democratic) 55.1%; ▌ L. W. Benthrum (Republican) 42.4%; ▌ T. B. Demaree (Prohibition) 2.5%
Kentucky 9	Joseph B. Bennett	Republican	1904	Incumbent re-elected.	▌ ✓ Joseph B. Bennett (Republican) 51.4%; ▌ James N. Kehoe (Democratic) 48.2%; ▌ L. H. Lanier (Socialist) 0.4%
Kentucky 10	Francis A. Hopkins	Democratic	1902	Incumbent lost re-election. Republican gain.	▌ ✓ John W. Langley (Republican) 50.7%; ▌ Francis A. Hopkins (Democratic) 48.0%; ▌ Wayne Cooper (Prohibition) 1.3%
Kentucky 11	Don C. Edwards	Republican	1904	Incumbent re-elected.	▌ ✓ Don C. Edwards (Republican) 61.9%; ▌ Ancil Gatliff (Democratic) 34.5%; ▌ Tobias Huffaker (Prohibition) 2.5%; ▌ Henry Parton (Socialist) 1.1%

== Louisiana ==
District	Incumbent			This race	
District	Member	Party	First elected	Results	Candidates
Louisiana 1	Adolph Meyer	Democratic	1890	Incumbent re-elected.	▌ ✓ Adolph Meyer (Democratic) 90.0%; ▌ Henry Seiner (Republican) 7.1%; ▌ A. L. Smith (Socialist) 2.9%
Louisiana 2	Robert C. Davey	Democratic	1896	Incumbent re-elected.	▌ ✓ Robert C. Davey (Democratic) 91.9%; ▌ A. L. Redden (Republican) 5.9%; ▌ W. C. Hall (Socialist) 2.2%
Louisiana 3	Robert F. Broussard	Democratic	1896	Incumbent re-elected.	▌ ✓ Robert F. Broussard (Democratic) 85.0%; ▌ S. P. Watts (Republican) 15.0%
Louisiana 4	John T. Watkins	Democratic	1904	Incumbent re-elected.	▌ ✓ John T. Watkins (Democratic) 97.3%; ▌ E. P. Mills (Republican) 2.7%
Louisiana 5	Joseph E. Ransdell	Democratic	1899	Incumbent re-elected.	▌ ✓ Joseph E. Ransdell (Democratic) 100%
Louisiana 6	Samuel M. Robertson	Democratic	1887	Incumbent lost renomination. Democratic hold.	▌ ✓ George K. Favrot (Democratic) 92.4%; ▌ John Deblieux (Republican) 7.6%
Louisiana 7	Arsène Pujo	Democratic	1902	Incumbent re-elected.	▌ ✓ Arsène Pujo (Democratic) 66.1%; ▌ Cornelius C. Duson (Republican) 31.0%; ▌ James Barnes (Socialist) 2.9%

== Maine ==
District	Incumbent			This race	
District	Member	Party	First elected	Results	Candidates
Maine 1	Amos L. Allen	Republican	1899	Incumbent re-elected.	▌ ✓ Amos L. Allen (Republican) 51.9%; ▌ James C. Hamlen (Democratic) 46.8%; ▌ N. H. Lord (Prohibition) 1.3%
Maine 2	Charles E. Littlefield	Republican	1899	Incumbent re-elected	▌ ✓ Charles E. Littlefield (Republican) 50.9%; ▌ Daniel J. McGillicuddy (Democratic) 47.2%; ▌ W. T. Eustis (Socialist) 1.1%; ▌ W. R. Pickering (Prohibition) 0.7%
Maine 3	Edwin C. Burleigh	Republican	1897	Incumbent re-elected.	▌ ✓ Edwin C. Burleigh (Republican) 51.7%; ▌ E. J. Lawrence (Democratic) 46.2%; ▌ R. G. Henderson (Socialist) 1.4%; ▌ S. F. Emerson (Prohibition) 0.7%
Maine 4	Llewellyn Powers	Republican	1901	Incumbent re-elected.	▌ ✓ Llewellyn Powers (Republican) 54.9%; ▌ George M. Hanson (Democratic) 43.6%; ▌ L. Sherwood (Prohibition) 1.5%

== Maryland ==
District	Incumbent	Party	First elected	Result	Candidates
Maryland 1	Thomas Alexander Smith	Democratic	1904	Incumbent lost re-election. Republican gain.	▌ ✓ William H. Jackson (Republican) 51.5%; ▌Thomas Alexander Smith (Democratic) 44.8%; ▌John H. Dulany (Prohibition) 3.7%
Maryland 2	J. Frederick C. Talbott	Democratic	1902	Incumbent re-elected.	▌ ✓ J. Frederick C. Talbott (Democratic) 50.2%; ▌Robert Garrett (Republican) 46.7%; ▌John S. Green (Prohibition) 1.8%; ▌George A. Bauer (Socialist) 1.2%
Maryland 3	Frank C. Wachter	Republican	1898	Incumbent retired. Democratic gain.	▌ ✓ Harry B. Wolf (Democratic) 49.8%; ▌William W. Johnson (Republican) 47.0%; ▌Joseph P. Jarboe (Socialist) 2.0%; ▌George R. Gorsuch (Prohibition) 1.2%
Maryland 4	John Gill Jr.	Democratic	1904	Incumbent re-elected.	▌ ✓ John Gill Jr. (Democratic) 50.7%; ▌John V. L. Findlay (Republican) 45.9%; ▌William M. Jett (Prohibition) 1.7%; ▌Edward B. Steele (Socialist) 1.6%
Maryland 5	Sydney E. Mudd I	Republican	1896	Incumbent re-elected.	▌ ✓ Sydney E. Mudd I (Republican) 53.7%; ▌George M. Smith (Democratic) 42.8%; ▌John S. Mathews (Socialist) 2.0%; ▌William H. Silk (Prohibition) 1.6%
Maryland 6	George A. Pearre	Republican	1898	Incumbent re-elected.	▌ ✓ George A. Pearre (Republican) 55.3%; ▌Harvey R. Spessard (Democratic) 38.5%; ▌Francis B. Sappington (Prohibition) 3.3%; ▌Ira Culp (Socialist) 2.9%

== Massachusetts ==
District	Incumbent			This race	
District	Member	Party	First elected	Results	Candidates
Massachusetts 1	George P. Lawrence	Republican	1897 (special)	Incumbent re-elected.	▌ ✓ George P. Lawrence (Republican) 59.7%; ▌Frank J. Lawler (Democratic) 36.4%; ▌Benjamin Clow (Socialist) 3.9%
Massachusetts 2	Frederick H. Gillett	Republican	1892	Incumbent re-elected.	▌ ✓ Frederick H. Gillett (Republican) 61.3%; ▌Edward A. Hall (Democratic) 32.5%; ▌George H. Wrenn (Socialist) 6.3%
Massachusetts 3	Rockwood Hoar	Republican	1904	Incumbent died. Winner also elected to finish term. Republican hold.	▌ ✓ Charles G. Washburn (Republican) 58.6%; ▌William I. McLoughlin (Democratic) 38.9%; ▌Louis F. Weiss (Socialist) 2.5%
Massachusetts 4	Charles Q. Tirrell	Republican	1900	Incumbent re-elected.	▌ ✓ Charles Q. Tirrell (Republican) 79.0%; ▌Timothy Richardson (Socialist) 20.9%; Others 0.1%
Massachusetts 5	Butler Ames	Republican	1902	Incumbent re-elected.	▌ ✓ Butler Ames (Republican) 54.2%; ▌Joseph J. Flynn (Democratic) 44.2%; ▌Fred P. Folsom (Socialist) 1.6%
Massachusetts 6	Augustus P. Gardner	Republican	1902 (special)	Incumbent re-elected.	▌ ✓ Augustus P. Gardner (Republican) 54.8%; ▌George A. Schofield (Democratic) 41.9%; ▌John F. Putnam (Socialist) 3.3%
Massachusetts 7	Ernest W. Roberts	Republican	1898	Incumbent re-elected.	▌ ✓ Ernest W. Roberts (Republican) 66.4%; ▌John A. O'Keefe (Democratic) 30.0%; ▌Bernard W. Gidney (Socialist) 3.6%
Massachusetts 8	Samuel W. McCall	Republican	1892	Incumbent re-elected.	▌ ✓ Samuel W. McCall (Republican) 59.4%; ▌Frederick Simpson Deitrick (Democratic) 38.7%; ▌Orton D. Field (Socialist) 2.0%
Massachusetts 9	John A. Keliher	Democratic	1902	Incumbent re-elected.	▌ ✓ John A. Keliher (Democratic) 68.1%; ▌Edward C. Webb (Republican) 26.6%; ▌George W. Galvin (Socialist) 5.3%
Massachusetts 10	William S. McNary	Democratic	1902	Incumbent retired. Democratic hold.	▌ ✓ Joseph F. O'Connell (Democratic) 54.9%; ▌Edward B. Callender (Republican) 42.3%; ▌Ira E. Worcester (Socialist) 2.7%
Massachusetts 11	John Andrew Sullivan	Democratic	1902	Incumbent retired. Democratic hold.	▌ ✓ Andrew J. Peters (Democratic) 53.9%; ▌Daniel W. Lane (Republican) 43.7%; ▌George G. Cutting (Socialist) 2.3%
Massachusetts 12	John W. Weeks	Republican	1904	Incumbent re-elected.	▌ ✓ John W. Weeks (Republican) 61.5%; ▌David W. Murray (Democratic) 34.3%; ▌Calvin C. Jordan (Socialist) 4.2%
Massachusetts 13	William S. Greene	Republican	1898 (special)	Incumbent re-elected.	▌ ✓ William S. Greene (Republican) 68.3%; ▌Francis M. Kennedy (Democratic) 31.7%
Massachusetts 14	William C. Lovering	Republican	1896	Incumbent re-elected.	▌ ✓ William C. Lovering (Republican) 61.8%; ▌Thomas F. Loorem (Democratic) 23.4%; ▌Dan White (Socialist) 14.8%

== Michigan ==
District	Incumbent			This race	
District	Member	Party	First elected	Results	Candidates
Michigan 1	Edwin Denby	Republican	1904	Incumbent re-elected.	▌ ✓ Edwin Denby (Republican) 57.5%; ▌ Frederick F. Ingram (Democratic) 41.1%; ▌ Charles Erb (Socialist) 0.9%; ▌ Milton G. Wylie (Prohibition) 0.3%; ▌ Peter Friesman (Socialist Labor) 0.2%
Michigan 2	Charles E. Townsend	Republican	1902	Incumbent re-elected.	▌ ✓ Charles E. Townsend (Republican) 96.2%; ▌ John W. Gray (Prohibition) 3.8%
Michigan 3	Washington Gardner	Republican	1898	Incumbent re-elected.	▌ ✓ Washington Gardner (Republican) 58.4%; ▌ John B. Shipman (Democratic) 36.1%; ▌ Francis A. Kulp (Socialist) 3.1%; ▌ James M. Shackleton (Prohibition) 2.4%
Michigan 4	Edward L. Hamilton	Republican	1896	Incumbent re-elected.	▌ ✓ Edward L. Hamilton (Republican) 60.6%; ▌ George R. Herkimer (Democratic) 37.8%; ▌ Hamilton S. McMaster (Socialist) 1.6%
Michigan 5	William Alden Smith	Republican	1894	Incumbent re-elected but resigned when elected U.S. Senator.	▌ ✓ William Alden Smith (Republican) 88.9%; ▌ John F. Nicles (Socialist) 6.3%; ▌ Isiah S. Morris (Prohibition) 4.8%
Michigan 6	Samuel W. Smith	Republican	1896	Incumbent re-elected.	▌ ✓ Samuel W. Smith (Republican) 60.4%; ▌ Peter B. Delisle (Democratic) 36.1%; ▌ Charles P. Russell (Prohibition) 2.7%; ▌ John A. C. Merton (Socialist) 0.8%
Michigan 7	Henry McMorran	Republican	1902	Incumbent re-elected.	▌ ✓ Henry McMorran (Republican) 59.6%; ▌ William Springer (Democratic) 38.4%; ▌ Lucius O. Boynton (Prohibition) 1.9%; ▌ J. M. Lamb (Socialist) 0.1%
Michigan 8	Joseph W. Fordney	Republican	1898	Incumbent re-elected.	▌ ✓ Joseph W. Fordney (Republican) 92.4%; ▌ W. A. Heartt (Prohibition) 4.7%; ▌ Abram G. Houghton (Socialist) 2.9%
Michigan 9	Roswell P. Bishop	Republican	1894	Incumbent lost renomination. Republican hold.	▌ ✓ James C. McLaughlin (Republican) 69.8%; ▌ Charles G. Wing (Democratic) 25.7%; ▌ William H. Hurlbut (Prohibition) 3.2%; ▌ John M. Smeijkel (Socialist) 1.3%
Michigan 10	George A. Loud	Republican	1902	Incumbent re-elected.	▌ ✓ George A. Loud (Republican) 97.2%; ▌ Joseph LaBarge (Socialist) 2.8%
Michigan 11	Archibald B. Darragh	Republican	1900	Incumbent re-elected.	▌ ✓ Archibald B. Darragh (Republican) 70.7%; ▌ Arthur J. Lacy (Democratic) 29.3%
Michigan 12	H. Olin Young	Republican	1902	Incumbent re-elected.	▌ ✓ H. Olin Young (Republican) 75.6%; ▌ John F. Ryan (Democratic) 21.4%; ▌ Frank Vivian (Socialist) 3.0%

== Minnesota ==
District	Incumbent			This race	
District	Member	Party	First elected	Results	Candidates
Minnesota 1	James A. Tawney	Republican	1892	Incumbent re-elected.	▌ ✓ James A. Tawney (Republican) 57.8%; ▌Andrew French (Democratic) 42.2%
Minnesota 2	James McCleary	Republican	1892	Incumbent lost re-election. Democratic gain.	▌ ✓ Winfield Scott Hammond (Democratic) 50.5%; ▌James McCleary (Republican) 46.5%; ▌David Tucker (Prohibition) 3.0%
Minnesota 3	Charles Russell Davis	Republican	1894	Incumbent re-elected.	▌ ✓ Charles Russell Davis (Republican) 99.9%
Minnesota 4	Frederick Stevens	Republican	1896	Incumbent re-elected.	▌ ✓ Frederick Stevens (Republican) 64.3%; ▌Gustave Scholle (Democratic) 30.6%; ▌Adolf Lando (Public Ownership) 5.1%
Minnesota 5	Loren Fletcher	Republican	1892; 1902 (lost); 1904	Incumbent retired. Republican hold.	▌ ✓ Frank Nye (Republican) 55.6%; ▌Frank D. Larrabee (Democratic) 38.5%; ▌Charles F. Dight (Public Ownership) 3.2%; ▌Frederick F. Lindsay (Prohibition) 2.7%
Minnesota 6	Clarence Buckman	Republican	1902	Incumbent lost renomination. Republican hold.	▌ ✓ Charles August Lindbergh (Republican) 56.1%; ▌Merrill C. Tifft (Democratic) 43.9%
Minnesota 7	Andrew Volstead	Republican	1902	Incumbent re-elected.	▌ ✓ Andrew Volstead (Republican) 100%
Minnesota 8	J. Adam Bede	Republican	1902	Incumbent re-elected.	▌ ✓ J. Adam Bede (Republican) 75.6%; ▌George F. Peterson (Public Ownership) 24.4%
Minnesota 9	Halvor Steenerson	Republican	1902	Incumbent re-elected.	▌ ✓ Halvor Steenerson (Republican) 80.1%; ▌Haldor E. Boen (Public Ownership) 19.9%

== Mississippi ==
District	Incumbent			This race	
District	Member	Party	First elected	Results	Candidates
Mississippi 1	Ezekiel S. Candler Jr.	Democratic	1900	Incumbent re-elected.	▌ ✓ Ezekiel S. Candler Jr. (Democratic) 100%
Mississippi 2	Thomas Spight	Democratic	1898 (special)	Incumbent re-elected.	▌ ✓ Thomas Spight (Democratic) 100%
Mississippi 3	Benjamin G. Humphreys II	Democratic	1902	Incumbent re-elected.	▌ ✓ Benjamin G. Humphreys II (Democratic) 100%
Mississippi 4	Wilson S. Hill	Democratic	1902	Incumbent re-elected.	▌ ✓ Wilson S. Hill (Democratic) 100%
Mississippi 5	Adam M. Byrd	Democratic	1902	Incumbent re-elected.	▌ ✓ Adam M. Byrd (Democratic) 100%
Mississippi 6	Eaton J. Bowers	Democratic	1902	Incumbent re-elected.	▌ ✓ Eaton J. Bowers (Democratic) 95.93%; ▌J. A. Brash (Socialist) 4.07%
Mississippi 7	Frank A. McLain	Democratic	1898 (special)	Incumbent re-elected.	▌ ✓ Frank A. McLain (Democratic) 100%
Mississippi 8	John S. Williams	Democratic	1892	Incumbent re-elected.	▌ ✓ John S. Williams (Democratic) 100%

== Missouri ==
District	Incumbent			This race	
District	Member	Party	First elected	Results	Candidates
Missouri 1	James T. Lloyd	Democratic	1897	Incumbent re-elected.	▌ ✓ James T. Lloyd (Democratic) 54.3%; ▌ Edward B. Clements (Republican) 45.7%
Missouri 2	William W. Rucker	Democratic	1898	Incumbent re-elected.	▌ ✓ William W. Rucker (Democratic) 56.7%; ▌ B. F. Beazell (Republican) 43.2%
Missouri 3	Frank B. Klepper	Republican	1904	Incumbent lost re-election. Democratic gain.	▌ ✓ Joshua W. Alexander (Democratic) 52.9%; ▌ Frank B. Klepper (Republican) 47.1%
Missouri 4	Frank B. Fulkerson	Republican	1904	Incumbent lost re-election. Democratic gain.	▌ ✓ Charles F. Booher (Democratic) 51.3%; ▌ Frank B. Fulkerson (Republican) 48.1%; ▌ F. B. Moser (Socialist) 0.6%
Missouri 5	Edgar C. Ellis	Republican	1904	Incumbent re-elected.	▌ ✓ Edgar C. Ellis (Republican) 51.4%; ▌ William H. Wallace (Democratic) 47.1%; ▌ William Scott (Socialist) 1.5%
Missouri 6	David A. De Armond	Democratic	1890	Incumbent re-elected.	▌ ✓ David A. De Armond (Democratic) 53.0%; ▌ William O. Atkeson (Republican) 47.0%
Missouri 7	John Welborn	Republican	1904	Incumbent lost re-election. Democratic gain.	▌ ✓ Courtney W. Hamlin (Democratic) 51.3%; ▌ John Welborn (Republican) 47.3%; ▌ K. B. Martin (Socialist) 1.4%
Missouri 8	Dorsey W. Shackleford	Democratic	1899	Incumbent re-elected.	▌ ✓ Dorsey W. Shackleford (Democratic) 53.4%; ▌ William Frank Quigley (Republican) 46.6%
Missouri 9	Champ Clark	Democratic	1896	Incumbent re-elected.	▌ ✓ Champ Clark (Democratic) 54.3%; ▌ J. B. Garber (Republican) 45.7%
Missouri 10	Richard Bartholdt	Republican	1892	Incumbent re-elected.	▌ ✓ Richard Bartholdt (Republican) 61.9%; ▌ Ralph W. Coale (Democratic) 32.0%; ▌ Gottlieb A. Hoehn (Socialist) 6.1%
Missouri 11	John T. Hunt	Democratic	1902	Incumbent lost renomination. Republican gain.	▌ ✓ Henry S. Caulfield (Republican) 47.8%; ▌ George Neville (Democratic) 47.6%; ▌ P. A. Hofher (Socialist) 4.6%
Missouri 12	Harry M. Coudrey	Republican	1904	Incumbent re-elected.	▌ ✓ Harry M. Coudrey (Republican) 50.1%; ▌ Colin M. Selph (Democratic) 46.4%; ▌ Chris Rooker (Socialist) 3.5%
Missouri 13	Marion E. Rhodes	Republican	1904	Incumbent lost re-election. Democratic gain.	▌ ✓ Madison R. Smith (Democratic) 50.7%; ▌ Marion E. Rhodes (Republican) 49.3%
Missouri 14	William T. Tyndall	Republican	1904	Incumbent lost re-election. Democratic gain.	▌ ✓ Joseph J. Russell (Democratic) 51.4%; ▌ William T. Tyndall (Republican) 48.3%
Missouri 15	Cassius M. Shartel	Republican	1904	Incumbent retired. Democratic gain.	▌ ✓ Thomas Hackney (Democratic) 48.3%; ▌ William R. Calkins (Republican) 47.6%; ▌ Philip Callery (Socialist) 4.1%
Missouri 16	Arthur P. Murphy	Republican	1904	Incumbent lost re-election. Democratic gain.	▌ ✓ J. Robert Lamar (Democratic) 50.7%; ▌ Arthur P. Murphy (Republican) 49.3%

== Montana ==
District	Incumbent			This race	
District	Member	Party	First elected	Results	Candidates
Montana at-large	Joseph M. Dixon	Republican	1902	Incumbent retired to run for U.S. senator. Republican hold.	▌ ✓ Charles N. Pray (Republican) 50.51%; ▌Thomas J. Walsh (Democratic) 40.77%; ▌John Hudson (Socialist) 8.26%; ▌J. H. Calderhead (Populist) 0.47%

== Nebraska ==
District	Incumbent			This race	
District	Member	Party	First elected	Results	Candidates
Nebraska 1	Ernest M. Pollard	Republican	1905 (special)	Incumbent re-elected.	▌ ✓ Ernest M. Pollard (Republican) 52.84%; ▌T. J. Doyle (Democratic/Populist) 42.46%; ▌Frank C. Taylor (Prohibition) 3.73%; ▌E. I. Root (Socialist) 0.96%
Nebraska 2	John L. Kennedy	Republican	1904	Incumbent lost re-election. Democratic gain.	▌ ✓ Gilbert Hitchcock (Democratic) 51.12%; ▌John L. Kennedy (Republican) 48.89%
Nebraska 3	John McCarthy	Republican	1902	Incumbent lost renomination. Republican hold.	▌ ✓ John F. Boyd (Republican) 48.99%; ▌Guy T. Graves (Democratic/Populist) 48.23%; ▌E. J. Flood (Prohibition) 2.01%; ▌L. DeVore (Socialist) 0.77%
Nebraska 4	Edmund H. Hinshaw	Republican	1902	Incumbent re-elected.	▌ ✓ Edmund H. Hinshaw (Republican) 55.02%; ▌John J. Thomas (Democratic/Populist) 43.97%; ▌J. C. Palmerton (Socialist) 1.01%
Nebraska 5	George W. Norris	Republican	1902	Incumbent re-elected.	▌ ✓ George W. Norris (Republican) 53.13%; ▌Roderick D. Sutherland (Democratic/Populist) 45.32%; ▌J. J. Larkey (Socialist) 1.56%
Nebraska 6	Moses Kinkaid	Republican	1902	Incumbent re-elected.	▌ ✓ Moses Kinkaid (Republican) 57.08%; ▌G. L. Shumway (Democratic/Populist) 40.18%; ▌W. N. Parsel (Socialist) 2.74%

== Nevada ==
District	Incumbent			This race	
District	Member	Party	First elected	Results	Candidates
Nevada at-large	Clarence D. Van Duzer	Democratic	1902	Incumbent retired. Democratic hold.	▌ ✓ George A. Bartlett (Democratic/Silver) 51.4%; ▌ Oscar J. Smith (Republican) 39.8%; ▌ H. T. Jardine (Socialist) 8.8%

== New Hampshire ==
District	Incumbent			This race	
District	Member	Party	First elected	Results	Candidates
New Hampshire 1	Cyrus A. Sulloway	Republican	1894	Incumbent re-elected.	▌ ✓ Cyrus A. Sulloway (Republican) 57.8%; ▌ Charles A. Morse (Democratic) 39.7%; ▌ Alva H. Morrill (Prohibition) 1.4%; ▌ Louis Arnstein (Socialist) 1.1%
New Hampshire 2	Frank D. Currier	Republican	1900	Incumbent re-elected.	▌ ✓ Frank D. Currier (Republican) 58.0%; ▌ Henry T. Ledoux (Democratic) 39.4%; ▌ W. B. Wellman (Socialist) 1.3%; ▌ Samuel T. Noyes (Prohibition) 1.3%

== New Jersey ==
District	Incumbent			This race	
District	Member	Party	First elected	Results	Candidates
New Jersey 1	Henry C. Loudenslager	Republican	1892	Incumbent re-elected.	▌ ✓ Henry C. Loudenslager (Republican) 65.8%; ▌ D. V. Summerill Jr. (Democratic) 29.6%; ▌ G. E. Day (Prohibition) 2.9%; ▌ R. C. Thurston (Socialist) 1.5%; ▌ F. W. Ball (Socialist Labor) 0.2%
New Jersey 2	John J. Gardner	Republican	1892	Incumbent re-elected.	▌ ✓ John J. Gardner (Republican) 63.0%; ▌ Samuel E. Perry (Democratic) 28.6%; ▌ William Riddle (Labor & Lincoln) 4.0%; ▌ W. F. Tower (Prohibition) 2.9%; ▌ Morris Korshet (Socialist) 1.2%; ▌ Marion R. Owen (Home Rule) 0.3%
New Jersey 3	Benjamin F. Howell	Republican	1894	Incumbent re-elected.	▌ ✓ Benjamin F. Howell (Republican) 54.3%; ▌ David Harvey Jr. (Democratic) 44.1%; ▌ R. B. Crowell (Prohibition) 1.2%; ▌ Frank Rapp (Socialist) 0.4%
New Jersey 4	Ira W. Wood	Republican	1904	Incumbent re-elected.	▌ ✓ Ira W. Wood (Republican) 52.9%; ▌ J. A. Southwick (Democratic) 42.3%; ▌ Upton Sinclair (Socialist) 2.9%; ▌ William Lunger (Prohibition) 1.5%; ▌ C. J. Wolff (Socialist Labor) 0.4%
New Jersey 5	Charles N. Fowler	Republican	1894	Incumbent re-elected.	▌ ✓ Charles N. Fowler (Republican) 48.8%; ▌ James E. Martine (Democratic) 47.5%; ▌ Harry Vaughn (Socialist) 2.5%; ▌ Harry Vaughn (Prohibition) 1.2%
New Jersey 6	Henry C. Allen	Republican	1904	Incumbent retired. Democratic gain.	▌ ✓ William Hughes (Democratic) 50.2%; ▌ C. H. Burke (Republican) 46.1%; ▌ C. P. De Yoe (Socialist) 1.9%; ▌ H. B. Collingswood (Prohibition) 1.1%; ▌ U. Frueh (Socialist Labor) 0.7%
New Jersey 7	Richard W. Parker	Republican	1894	Incumbent re-elected.	▌ ✓ Richard W. Parker (Republican) 49.5%; ▌ C. F. Kraemer (Democratic) 48.0%; ▌ P. B. Ball (Socialist) 1.6%; ▌ G. A. Johnston (Socialist Labor) 0.5%; ▌ S. D. Riddle (Prohibition) 0.4%
New Jersey 8	William H. Wiley	Republican	1902	Incumbent lost renomination. Democratic gain.	▌ ✓ Le Gage Pratt (Democratic) 56.9%; ▌ H. J. Gottlob (Republican) 38.7%; ▌ E. C. Wind (Socialist) 3.3%; ▌ Herman Hartung (Socialist Labor) 0.8%; ▌ Robert Burnet (Prohibition) 0.3%
New Jersey 9	Marshall Van Winkle	Republican	1904	Incumbent retired. Democratic gain.	▌ ✓ Eugene W. Leake (Democratic) 55.4%; ▌ C. E. Pickett (Republican) 38.1%; ▌ M. F. Fackert (Socialist) 3.1%; ▌ K. M. Forbes (Independent Labor) 2.1%; ▌ N. H. Hernberg (Socialist Labor) 0.8%; ▌ N. H. Raymond (Prohibition) 0.5%
New Jersey 10	Allan L. McDermott	Democratic	1900	Incumbent retired. Democratic hold.	▌ ✓ James A. Hamill (Democratic) 65.2%; ▌ Howard Cruse (Republican) 26.5%; ▌ L. P. O'Lone (Independent Labor) 3.9%; ▌ Charles Ufert (Socialist) 3.2%; ▌ Walter Gilpin (Socialist Labor) 0.9%; ▌ D. H. Garrison (Prohibition) 0.3%

== New York ==
District	Incumbent			This race	
District	Member	Party	First elected	Results	Candidates
New York 1	William W. Cocks	Republican	1904	Incumbent re-elected.	▌ ✓ William W. Cocks (Republican) 60.3%; ▌ Monson Morris (Democratic) 38.5%; ▌ George R. Scott (Prohibition) 1.2%
New York 2	George H. Lindsay	Democratic	1900	Incumbent re-elected.	▌ ✓ George H. Lindsay (Democratic) 39.2%; ▌ John J. McManus (Independence League) 31.2%; ▌ Ernest C. Wagner (Republican) 26.1%; ▌ Conrad Weber (Socialist) 3.3%; ▌ Arthur Vail (Prohibition) 0.2%
New York 3	Charles T. Dunwell	Republican	1902	Incumbent re-elected.	▌ ✓ Charles T. Dunwell (Republican) 45.5%; ▌ Walter B. Raymond (Democratic) 29.5%; ▌ Henry C. Peters (Independence League) 22.3%; ▌ Fred Schafer (Socialist) 2.5%; ▌ Franklin D. Newman (Prohibition) 0.2%
New York 4	Charles B. Law	Republican	1904	Incumbent re-elected.	▌ ✓ Charles B. Law (Republican) 41.3%; ▌ Herman H. Torborg (Democratic) 29.3%; ▌ Edson Lawrence (Independence League) 25.6%; ▌ George L. Giefer (Socialist) 3.6%; ▌ Andrew L. Martin (Prohibition) 0.2%
New York 5	George E. Waldo	Republican	1904	Incumbent re-elected.	▌ ✓ George E. Waldo (Republican) 46.1%; ▌ John J. Roach (Democratic) 27.9%; ▌ Michael A. Fitzgerald (Independence League) 24.6%; ▌ Alexander Fraser (Socialist) 1.1%; ▌ George H. MacEathron (Prohibition) 0.3%
New York 6	William M. Calder	Republican	1904	Incumbent re-elected.	▌ ✓ William M. Calder (Republican) 54.9%; ▌ Robert Baker (Democratic/Ind. League) 44.3%; ▌ Leighton Baker (Socialist) 0.8%
New York 7	John J. Fitzgerald	Democratic	1898	Incumbent re-elected.	▌ ✓ John J. Fitzgerald (Democratic) 47.1%; ▌ Charles R. Banks (Republican) 26.4%; ▌ John T. Moran (Independence League) 25.7%; ▌ William A. Schmidt (Socialist) 0.7%; ▌ James T. Stanley (Prohibition) 0.1%
New York 8	Timothy Sullivan	Democratic	1902	Incumbent died. Winner also elected to finish term. Democratic hold.	▌ ✓ Daniel J. Riordan (Democratic) 65.6%; ▌ Frank L. Frugone (Republican) 32.7%; ▌ Edward F. Cassidy (Socialist) 1.1%; ▌ Parker J. Gates (Prohibition) 0.4%; ▌ Charles Sullivan (Independence League) 0.2%
New York 9	Henry M. Goldfogle	Democratic	1900	Incumbent re-elected.	▌ ✓ Henry M. Goldfogle (Democratic) 53.3%; ▌ Morris Hillquit (Socialist) 26.3%; ▌ Charles S. Adler (Republican) 20.0%; ▌ Timothy N. Holden (Prohibition) 0.4%
New York 10	William Sulzer	Democratic	1894	Incumbent re-elected.	▌ ✓ William Sulzer (Democratic/Ind. League) 71.3%; ▌ Frederick J. Etzel (Republican) 21.6%; ▌ Alexander Jonas (Socialist) 7.0%; ▌ Benjamin T. Rogers (Prohibition) 0.1%
New York 11	William Randolph Hearst	Democratic	1902	Incumbent retired to run for Governor of New York. Democratic hold.	▌ ✓ Charles V. Fornes (Democratic/Ind. League) 70.3%; ▌ Charles W. Lefler (Republican) 28.2%; ▌ Edward M. Martin (Socialist) 1.4%; ▌ Viggio Rugaard (Prohibition) 0.1%
New York 12	William Bourke Cockran	Democratic	1904	Incumbent re-elected.	▌ ✓ William Bourke Cockran (Democratic/Ind. League) 71.4%; ▌ Henry Carey (Republican) 25.8%; ▌ Patrick H. Donahue (Socialist) 2.7%; ▌ August W. Pfluger (Prohibition) 0.1%
New York 13	Herbert Parsons	Republican	1904	Incumbent re-elected.	▌ ✓ Herbert Parsons (Republican) 55.0%; ▌ William H. Jackson (Democratic) 33.2%; ▌ Frank Henderick (Independence League) 10.7%; ▌ Charles G. Teche (Socialist) 0.8%; ▌ Carl Grinskald (Prohibition) 0.3%
New York 14	Charles A. Towne	Democratic	1904	Incumbent retired. Democratic hold.	▌ ✓ William Willett Jr. (Democratic) 46.3%; ▌ Frank E. Losee (Republican) 26.2%; ▌ Charles E. Shober (Independence League) 21.3%; ▌ Richard Morton (Socialist) 6.1%; ▌ Albert Wadhams (Prohibition) 0.1%
New York 15	J. Van Vechten Olcott	Republican	1904	Incumbent re-elected.	▌ ✓ J. Van Vechten Olcott (Republican) 54.8%; ▌ John J. Halligan (Democratic/Ind. League) 44.4%; ▌ Leonard D. Abbott (Socialist) 0.7%; ▌ Loyal S. Wright (Prohibition) 0.1%
New York 16	Jacob Ruppert	Democratic	1898	Incumbent retired. Democratic hold.	▌ ✓ Francis Burton Harrison (Democratic/Ind. League) 66.3%; ▌ Jacob R. Schiff (Republican) 27.6%; ▌ James G. Kanely (Socialist) 4.3%; ▌ Samuel F. Hyman (Independent) 1.7%; ▌ John C. Wallace (Prohibition) 0.1%
New York 17	William Stiles Bennet	Republican	1904	Incumbent re-elected.	▌ ✓ William Stiles Bennet (Republican) 53.1%; ▌ Francis Emanuel Shober (Democratic/Ind. League) 45.5%; ▌ Warren W. Atkinson (Socialist) 1.2%; ▌ George Munro (Prohibition) 0.2%
New York 18	Joseph A. Goulden	Democratic	1902	Incumbent re-elected.	▌ ✓ Joseph A. Goulden (Democratic) 46.9%; ▌ James L. Wells (Republican) 29.7%; ▌ James T. Farrelly (Independence League) 20.1%; ▌ Richard Bock (Socialist) 3.0%; ▌ David Lyle (Prohibition) 0.3%
New York 19	John Emory Andrus	Republican	1904	Incumbent re-elected.	▌ ✓ John Emory Andrus (Republican) 53.8%; ▌ Timothy Healy (Democratic) 44.3%; ▌ Henry W. Wessling (Socialist) 1.3%; ▌ Collin F. Jewell (Prohibition) 0.6%
New York 20	Thomas W. Bradley	Republican	1902	Incumbent re-elected.	▌ ✓ Thomas W. Bradley (Republican) 55.9%; ▌ Victor A. Wilder (Democratic/Ind. League) 42.5%; ▌ Thomas G. Sayre (Prohibition) 1.1%; ▌ Thomas J. Lloyd (Socialist) 0.5%
New York 21	John H. Ketcham	Republican	1896	Incumbent died. Republican hold.	▌ ✓ Samuel McMillan (Republican) 51.0%; ▌ Percy W. Decker (Democratic/Ind. League) 48.6%; ▌ Andrew C. Fancher (Socialist) 0.4%
New York 22	William H. Draper	Republican	1900	Incumbent re-elected.	▌ ✓ William H. Draper (Republican) 55.3%; ▌ Thomas A. Paterson (Democratic/Ind. League) 42.5%; ▌ George M. Foster (Prohibition) 1.4%; ▌ Carl H. Caspar (Socialist) 0.8%
New York 23	George N. Southwick	Republican	1900	Incumbent re-elected.	▌ ✓ George N. Southwick (Republican) 50.7%; ▌ George C. Hisgen (Democratic/Ind. League) 47.7%; ▌ Henry V. Jackson (Socialist) 1.6%
New York 24	Frank J. LeFevre	Republican	1904	Incumbent lost renomination. Republican hold.	▌ ✓ George Winthrop Fairchild (Republican) 51.3%; ▌ Walter Scott (Democratic/Ind. League) 48.7%
New York 25	Lucius Littauer	Republican	1896	Incumbent retired. Republican hold.	▌ ✓ Cyrus Durey (Republican) 55.4%; ▌ Frank Beebe (Democratic) 40.7%; ▌ Charles A. Stupplebeen (Prohibition) 2.6%; ▌ James O'Neil (Socialist) 1.3%
New York 26	William H. Flack	Republican	1902	Incumbent died. Republican hold.	▌ ✓ George R. Malby (Republican) 70.2%; ▌ Andrew B. Cooney (Democratic) 29.3%; ▌ Ernest C. Beers (Socialist) 0.5%
New York 27	James S. Sherman	Republican	1892	Incumbent re-elected.	▌ ✓ James S. Sherman (Republican) 53.3%; ▌ James K. O'Connor (Democratic/Ind. League) 43.8%; ▌ Norman A. Darling (Prohibition) 1.5%; ▌ Arthur L. Byron-Curtiss (Socialist) 1.4%
New York 28	Charles L. Knapp	Republican	1900	Incumbent re-elected.	▌ ✓ Charles L. Knapp (Republican) 60.7%; ▌ Jay C. Bardo (Democratic) 32.5%; ▌ Frank H. Lewis (Prohibition) 5.7%; ▌ Raymond K. Bull (Socialist) 1.1%
New York 29	Michael E. Driscoll	Republican	1898	Incumbent re-elected.	▌ ✓ Michael E. Driscoll (Republican) 61.4%; ▌ William W. Van Brocklin (Democratic) 35.2%; ▌ George Cochran (Prohibition) 2.1%; ▌ Charles J. Baker (Socialist) 1.3%
New York 30	John W. Dwight	Republican	1902	Incumbent re-elected.	▌ ✓ John W. Dwight (Republican) 59.9%; ▌ Amasa G. Genung (Democratic) 36.0%; ▌ Victor A. Scott (Prohibition) 3.7%; ▌ William J. C. Wismar (Socialist) 0.4%
New York 31	Sereno E. Payne	Republican	1889	Incumbent re-elected.	▌ ✓ Sereno E. Payne (Republican) 62.6%; ▌ Dudley M. Warner (Democratic) 34.8%; ▌ Nelson A. Jackson (Prohibition) 1.8%; ▌ Prosper A. Perrin (Socialist) 0.8%
New York 32	James Breck Perkins	Republican	1900	Incumbent re-elected.	▌ ✓ James Breck Perkins (Republican) 52.4%; ▌ William L. Manning (Democratic) 44.2%; ▌ Henry D. Henderson (Socialist) 2.0%; ▌ Jacob H. Durkee (Prohibition) 1.4%
New York 33	Jacob Sloat Fassett	Republican	1904	Incumbent re-elected.	▌ ✓ Jacob Sloat Fassett (Republican) 55.0%; ▌ Frank P. Frost (Democratic) 41.1%; ▌ Francis E. Baldwin (Prohibition) 2.5%; ▌ Hawley S. Pettibone (Socialist) 1.4%
New York 34	James W. Wadsworth	Republican	1890	Incumbent lost re-election. Independent Republican gain.	▌ ✓ Peter A. Porter (Ind. Republican/Democratic) 55.6%; ▌ James W. Wadsworth (Republican) 42.9%; ▌ William V. Blighton (Prohibition) 1.6%
New York 35	William H. Ryan	Democratic	1898	Incumbent re-elected.	▌ ✓ William H. Ryan (Democratic) 56.5%; ▌ Frank X. Bernhardt (Republican) 42.1%; ▌ Samuel F. Leary (Socialist) 1.1%; ▌ Elijah J. Cook (Prohibition) 0.3%
New York 36	De Alva S. Alexander	Republican	1896	Incumbent re-elected.	▌ ✓ De Alva S. Alexander (Republican) 58.0%; ▌ John W. Williams (Democratic) 38.5%; ▌ Charles B. Mathews (Independence League) 1.9%; ▌ Henry Moses (Socialist) 0.9%; ▌ Abraham L. Witmer (Prohibition) 0.7%
New York 37	Edward B. Vreeland	Republican	1899	Incumbent re-elected.	▌ ✓ Edward B. Vreeland (Republican) 65.2%; ▌ Mark Graves (Democratic) 29.6%; ▌ Edwin Williams (Prohibition) 3.0%; ▌ Eugene R. Esler (Socialist) 2.2%

== North Carolina ==
District	Incumbent			This race	
District	Member	Party	First elected	Results	Candidates
North Carolina 1	John H. Small	Democratic	1898	Incumbent re-elected.	▌ ✓ John H. Small (Democratic) 75.8%; ▌ John Q. A. Wood (Republican) 24.0%
North Carolina 2	Claude Kitchin	Democratic	1900	Incumbent re-elected.	▌ ✓ Claude Kitchin (Democratic) 84.6%; ▌ J. R. Gaskill (Republican) 15.3%
North Carolina 3	Charles R. Thomas	Democratic	1898	Incumbent re-elected.	▌ ✓ Charles R. Thomas (Democratic) 66.3%; ▌ W. R. Dixon (Republican) 33.7%
North Carolina 4	Edward W. Pou	Democratic	1900	Incumbent re-elected.	▌ ✓ Edward W. Pou (Democratic) 69.8%; ▌ Berry Godwin (Republican) 30.2%
North Carolina 5	William Walton Kitchin	Democratic	1896	Incumbent re-elected.	▌ ✓ William Walton Kitchin (Democratic) 59.6%; ▌ C. A. Reynolds (Republican) 40.0%
North Carolina 6	Gilbert B. Patterson	Democratic	1902	Incumbent retired. Democratic hold.	▌ ✓ Hannibal L. Godwin (Democratic) 67.7%; ▌ James B. Schulken (Republican) 32.3%
North Carolina 7	Robert N. Page	Democratic	1902	Incumbent re-elected.	▌ ✓ Robert N. Page (Democratic) 56.7%; ▌ G. B. D. Reynolds (Republican) 43.3%
North Carolina 8	E. Spencer Blackburn	Republican	1904	Incumbent lost re-election. Democratic gain.	▌ ✓ Richard N. Hackett (Democratic) 51.6%; ▌ E. Spencer Blackburn (Republican) 48.4%
North Carolina 9	E. Yates Webb	Democratic	1902	Incumbent re-elected.	▌ ✓ E. Yates Webb (Democratic) 58.6%; ▌ Frank Roberts (Republican) 41.4%
North Carolina 10	James M. Gudger Jr.	Democratic	1902	Incumbent retired. Democratic hold.	▌ ✓ William T. Crawford (Democratic) 51.6%; ▌ James Jefferson Britt (Republican) 48.2%; ▌ E. R. Israel (Socialist) 0.2%

== North Dakota ==
District	Incumbent			This race	
District	Member	Party	First elected	Results	Candidates
North Dakota at-large 2 seats on a general ticket	Thomas F. Marshall	Republican	1900	Incumbent re-elected.	▌ ✓ Thomas F. Marshall (Republican) 32.34%; ▌ ✓ Asle Gronna (Republican) 30.55%; ▌A. G. Burr (Democratic) 17.74%; ▌John D. Benton (Democratic) 17.49%; ▌Kittel Halvorson (Socialist) 0.96%; ▌W. J. Bailey (Socialist) 0.94%
North Dakota at-large 2 seats on a general ticket	Asle Gronna	Republican	1904	Incumbent re-elected.	▌ ✓ Thomas F. Marshall (Republican) 32.34%; ▌ ✓ Asle Gronna (Republican) 30.55%; ▌A. G. Burr (Democratic) 17.74%; ▌John D. Benton (Democratic) 17.49%; ▌Kittel Halvorson (Socialist) 0.96%; ▌W. J. Bailey (Socialist) 0.94%

== Ohio ==
District	Incumbent			This race	
District	Member	Party	First elected	Results	Candidates
Ohio 1	Nicholas Longworth	Republican	1902	Incumbent re-elected.	▌ ✓ Nicholas Longworth (Republican) 56.9%; ▌ Thomas H. Bentham (Democratic) 40.7%; ▌ A. S. Matter (Socialist) 2.2%; ▌ George S. Hawke (Prohibition) 0.2%
Ohio 2	Herman P. Goebel	Republican	1902	Incumbent re-elected.	▌ ✓ Herman P. Goebel (Republican) 59.1%; ▌ John H. Meyer (Democratic) 31.2%; ▌ Harry R. Probasco (Independent) 5.8%; ▌ Nicholas Klein (Socialist) 3.6%; ▌ Schuyler A. Sherman (Prohibition) 0.3%
Ohio 3	Robert M. Nevin	Republican	1900	Incumbent declined renomination. Republican hold.	▌ ✓ J. Eugene Harding (Republican) 49.5%; ▌ James E. Campbell (Democratic) 46.0%; ▌ Daniel P. Farrell (Socialist) 3.7%; ▌ Martin Shively (Prohibition) 0.8%
Ohio 4	Harvey C. Garber	Democratic	1902	Incumbent retired. Democratic hold.	▌ ✓ William E. Tou Velle (Democratic) 55.6%; ▌ J. C. Rosser (Republican) 40.9%; ▌ James C. Roberts (Prohibition) 1.3%; ▌ Charles H. Adkins (Independent) 1.3%; ▌ Edgar W. Cowles (Socialist) 0.9%
Ohio 5	William Wildman Campbell	Republican	1904	Incumbent lost re-election. Democratic gain.	▌ ✓ Timothy T. Ansberry (Democratic) 50.7%; ▌ William Wildman Campbell (Republican) 47.7%; ▌ J. H. Edwards (Prohibition) 1.0%; ▌ Aaron Donaldson (Socialist) 0.6%
Ohio 6	Thomas E. Scroggy	Republican	1904	Incumbent retired. Democratic gain.	▌ ✓ Matthew Denver (Democratic) 50.6%; ▌ Charles Q. Hildebrant (Republican) 47.2%; ▌ Edward J. Meacham (Prohibition) 1.3%; ▌ Joseph H. Sims (Socialist) 0.9%
Ohio 7	J. Warren Keifer	Republican	1904	Incumbent re-elected.	▌ ✓ J. Warren Keifer (Republican) 53.8%; ▌ William B. Rodgers (Democratic) 41.8%; ▌ William H. Leist (Prohibition) 2.2%; ▌ J. Frank Bradbury (Socialist) 2.2%
Ohio 8	Ralph D. Cole	Republican	1904	Incumbent re-elected.	▌ ✓ Ralph D. Cole (Republican) 54.9%; ▌ Homer Southard (Democratic) 41.9%; ▌ John W. Pegg (Prohibition) 1.7%; ▌ William A. Linard (Socialist) 1.5%
Ohio 9	James H. Southard	Republican	1894	Incumbent lost renomination. Democratic gain.	▌ ✓ Isaac R. Sherwood (Democratic) 47.8%; ▌ E. G. McClelland (Republican) 47.7%; ▌ Walter C. Guntrup (Socialist) 3.5%; ▌ Ellis H. Borton (Prohibition) 1.0%
Ohio 10	Henry T. Bannon	Republican	1904	Incumbent re-elected.	▌ ✓ Henry T. Bannon (Republican) 53.3%; ▌ Thomas H. Jones (Democratic) 43.5%; ▌ Samuel Llewellyn (Prohibition) 1.7%; ▌ Albert Hales (Socialist) 1.5%
Ohio 11	Charles H. Grosvenor	Republican	1892	Incumbent lost renomination. Republican hold.	▌ ✓ Albert Douglas (Republican) 50.4%; ▌ Oliver W. Wright (Democratic) 47.2%; ▌ Albanus C. Purvis (Prohibition) 1.4%; ▌ Joseph A. Siemer (Socialist) 1.0%
Ohio 12	Edward L. Taylor Jr.	Republican	1904	Incumbent re-elected.	▌ ✓ Edward L. Taylor Jr. (Republican) 56.9%; ▌ William A. Taylor (Democratic) 38.7%; ▌ Oscar Ameringer (Socialist) 2.6%; ▌ Frank M. Mecartney (Prohibition) 1.3%; ▌ Edward J. Bracken (Independent) 0.5%
Ohio 13	Grant E. Mouser	Republican	1904	Incumbent re-elected.	▌ ✓ Grant E. Mouser (Republican) 49.2%; ▌ Daniel Richard Crissinger (Democratic) 48.5%; ▌ Martin H. Derroco (Socialist) 1.4%; ▌ Hewson L. Peeke (Prohibition) 0.9%
Ohio 14	Amos R. Webber	Republican	1904	Incumbent lost renomination. Republican hold.	▌ ✓ J. Ford Laning (Republican) 51.7%; ▌ William H. Budd (Democratic) 45.5%; ▌ F. C. Ross (Socialist) 1.6%; ▌ Ralph Davey (Prohibition) 1.2%
Ohio 15	Beman Gates Dawes	Republican	1904	Incumbent re-elected.	▌ ✓ Beman Gates Dawes (Republican) 49.6%; ▌ George White (Democratic) 45.8%; ▌ Lewis E. Kieth (Prohibition) 3.1%; ▌ Frank B. Martin (Socialist) 1.5%
Ohio 16	Capell L. Weems	Republican	1902	Incumbent re-elected.	▌ ✓ Capell L. Weems (Republican) 53.9%; ▌ Frank A. Summers (Democratic) 41.6%; ▌ Thornton A. Rodefer (Prohibition) 2.5%; ▌ Lewis Hays (Socialist) 2.0%
Ohio 17	Martin L. Smyser	Republican	1904	Incumbent lost re-election. Democratic gain.	▌ ✓ William A. Ashbrook (Democratic) 49.3%; ▌ Martin L. Smyser (Republican) 48.1%; ▌ Horace Whitcomb (Socialist) 1.4%; ▌ William B. King (Prohibition) 1.2%
Ohio 18	James Kennedy	Republican	1902	Incumbent re-elected.	▌ ✓ James Kennedy (Republican) 49.5%; ▌ John C. Welty (Democratic) 44.9%; ▌ Leslie E. Hawk (Prohibition) 3.3%; ▌ John Evans (Socialist) 2.3%
Ohio 19	W. Aubrey Thomas	Republican	1904	Incumbent re-elected.	▌ ✓ W. Aubrey Thomas (Republican) 61.3%; ▌ Thaddeus E. Hoyt (Democratic) 32.9%; ▌ Everett St. John (Socialist) 3.7%; ▌ James H. Ford (Prohibition) 2.1%
Ohio 20	Jacob A. Beidler	Republican	1900	Incumbent lost renomination. Republican hold.	▌ ✓ L. Paul Howland (Republican) 51.8%; ▌ Charles W. Lapp (Democratic) 45.3%; ▌ John G. Willert (Socialist) 2.2%; ▌ Abel A. Bostwick (Prohibition) 0.7%
Ohio 21	Theodore E. Burton	Republican	1894	Incumbent re-elected.	▌ ✓ Theodore E. Burton (Republican) 92.9%; ▌ Robert Bandlow (Socialist) 6.1%; ▌ J. Walter Malone (Prohibition) 1.0%

== Oregon ==
District	Incumbent			This race	
District	Member	Party	First elected	Results	Candidates
Oregon 1	Binger Hermann	Republican	1903 (special)	Incumbent retired. Republican hold.	▌ ✓ Willis C. Hawley (Republican) 49.13%; ▌Charles V. Galloway (Democratic) 41.1%; ▌W. W. Myers (Socialist) 5.9%; ▌Edward F. Green (Prohibition) 3.8%
Oregon 2	John N. Williamson	Republican	1902	Incumbent retired. Republican hold.	▌ ✓ William R. Ellis (Republican) 61.0%; ▌James H. Graham (Democratic) 26.2%; ▌A. M. Paul (Socialist) 7.6%; ▌H. W. Stone (Prohibition) 5.2%

== Pennsylvania ==
District	Incumbent			This race	
District	Member	Party	First elected	Results	Candidates
Pennsylvania 1	Henry H. Bingham	Republican	1878	Incumbent re-elected.	▌ ✓ Henry H. Bingham (Republican/Jefferson) 63.7%; ▌ E. Spencer Miller (Lincoln) 22.9%; ▌ Joseph L. Galen (Democratic) 12.4%; ▌ E. J. Higgins (Socialist) 0.9%; ▌ Edward Hazlehurst (Constitutional) 0.1%
Pennsylvania 2	Robert Adams Jr.	Republican	1893	Incumbent died. Winner also elected to finish term. Republican hold.	▌ ✓ John E. Reyburn (Republican/Lincoln) 85.7%; ▌ G. Frank Stephens (Democratic) 13.0%; ▌ Robert J. Lewis (Socialist) 1.1%; ▌ Godfrey Saringer (Prohibition) 0.2%
Pennsylvania 3	George A. Castor	Republican	1904	Incumbent died. Winner also elected to finish term. Republican hold.	▌ ✓ J. Hampton Moore (Republican/Jefferson) 63.6%; ▌ William J. O'Brien (Democratic/Lincoln) 35.1%; ▌ Charles Sehl (Socialist) 1.3%
Pennsylvania 4	Reuben Moon	Republican	1903	Incumbent re-elected.	▌ ✓ Reuben Moon (Republican/Lincoln) 85.6%; ▌ Horace Fogel (Democratic) 13.0%; ▌ Herman L Kumme (Socialist) 1.4%
Pennsylvania 5	Edward de Veaux Morrell	Republican	1900	Incumbent retired. Republican hold.	▌ ✓ William W. Foulkrod (Republican/Lincoln) 86.1%; ▌ Thomas P. Dolan (Democratic) 11.7%; ▌ Robert E Nicholson (Socialist) 2.2%
Pennsylvania 6	George D. McCreary	Republican	1902	Incumbent re-elected.	▌ ✓ George D. McCreary (Republican/Lincoln) 84.6%; ▌ Francis X. Ward (Democratic) 14.2%; ▌ Hyland W Potter (Socialist) 1.2%
Pennsylvania 7	Thomas S. Butler	Republican	1896	Incumbent re-elected.	▌ ✓ Thomas S. Butler (Republican) 70.0%; ▌ John J. Buckley (Democratic) 29.3%; ▌ Walter N. Lodge (Socialist) 0.7%
Pennsylvania 8	Irving P. Wanger	Republican	1892	Incumbent re-elected.	▌ ✓ Irving P. Wanger (Republican) 54.6%; ▌ Walter F. Leedom (Democratic/Lincoln) 44.4%; ▌ Hugh Ayres (Socialist) 1.0%
Pennsylvania 9	Henry B. Cassel	Republican	1901	Incumbent re-elected.	▌ ✓ Henry B. Cassel (Republican) 67.7%; ▌ J. Harold Wickersham (Lincoln) 32.3%
Pennsylvania 10	Thomas H. Dale	Republican	1904	Incumbent lost re-election. Democratic gain.	▌ ✓ Thomas D. Nicholls (Democratic) 60.3%; ▌ Thomas H. Dale (Republican/Lincoln) 39.4%; ▌ C. J. Rechsteiner (Socialist) 0.3%
Pennsylvania 11	Henry W. Palmer	Republican	1900	Incumbent retired. Democratic gain.	▌ ✓ John T. Lenahan (Democratic) 50.6%; ▌ Bennet J. Cobleigh (Roosevelt Square Deal) 30.1%; ▌ William H. Dettry (Socialist) 16.3%; ▌ Thomas Kerr (Prohibition) 3.1%
Pennsylvania 12	George R. Patterson	Republican	1900	Incumbent died. Winner also elected to finish term. Republican hold.	▌ ✓ Charles N. Brumm (Republican) 58.5%; ▌ Watson F. Shepperd (Democratic) 38.3%; ▌ Cornelius F. Foley (Socialist) 3.2%
Pennsylvania 13	Marcus C. L. Kline	Democratic	1902	Incumbent retired. Democratic hold.	▌ ✓ John H. Rothermel (Democratic) 54.2%; ▌ Alex N. Ulrich (Republican) 40.8%; ▌ Morris E. Gibson (Socialist) 5.1%
Pennsylvania 14	Mial Eben Lilley	Republican	1904	Incumbent lost re-election. Democratic gain.	▌ ✓ George W. Kipp (Democratic) 49.2%; ▌ Mial Eben Lilley (Republican) 46.0%; ▌ G. P. Little (Prohibition) 4.8%
Pennsylvania 15	Elias Deemer	Republican	1900	Incumbent lost re-election. Democratic gain.	▌ ✓ William B. Wilson (Democratic) 48.2%; ▌ Elias Deemer (Republican) 47.0%; ▌ Frederick C. Heilman (Prohibition) 3.8%; ▌ Fred H. Sharar (Socialist) 1.0%
Pennsylvania 16	Edmund W. Samuel	Republican	1904	Incumbent lost re-election. Democratic gain.	▌ ✓ John G. McHenry (Democratic) 53.8%; ▌ Edmund W. Samuel (Republican) 44.4%; ▌ Patrick Smith (Socialist) 1.9%
Pennsylvania 17	Thaddeus M. Mahon	Republican	1892	Incumbent retired. Republican hold.	▌ ✓ Benjamin K. Focht (Republican) 52.2%; ▌ William Alexander (Democratic) 42.8%; ▌ E. M. Hummel (Lincoln) 5.0%
Pennsylvania 18	Marlin E. Olmsted	Republican	1896	Incumbent re-elected.	▌ ✓ Marlin E. Olmsted (Republican) 58.9%; ▌ John Lindner (Democratic) 37.9%; ▌ J. Wesley Ellenberger (Prohibition) 2.3%; ▌ H. J. Rohe (Socialist) 0.9%
Pennsylvania 19	John Merriman Reynolds	Republican	1904	Incumbent re-elected.	▌ ✓ John Merriman Reynolds (Republican) 50.6%; ▌ Joseph E. Thropp (Democratic/Lincoln) 39.4%; ▌ Warren W. Bailey (Bryan) 6.2%; ▌ John W. Blake (Pennsylvania Blacksmith) 3.8%
Pennsylvania 20	Daniel F. Lafean	Republican	1902	Incumbent re-elected.	▌ ✓ Daniel F. Lafean (Republican) 50.7%; ▌ Horace Keesey (Democratic) 49.3%
Pennsylvania 21	Solomon R. Dresser	Republican	1902	Incumbent retired. Republican hold.	▌ ✓ Charles Frederick Barclay (Republican) 57.5%; ▌ Hugh S. Taylor (Democratic) 40.0%; ▌ James D. Blair (Socialist) 2.5%
Pennsylvania 22	George F. Huff	Republican	1902	Incumbent re-elected.	▌ ✓ George F. Huff (Republican) 59.0%; ▌ Silas A. Kline (Democratic/Lincoln) 38.9%; ▌ Daniel Stull (Socialist) 1.9%; ▌ John C. Kerr (Prohibition) 0.1%
Pennsylvania 23	Allen F. Cooper	Republican	1902	Incumbent re-elected.	▌ ✓ Allen F. Cooper (Republican) 54.7%; ▌ Ernest O. Kooser (Democratic/Lincoln) 37.6%; ▌ John O. Stoner (Prohibition) 6.5%; ▌ Washington Herd (Socialist) 1.2%
Pennsylvania 24	Ernest F. Acheson	Republican	1894	Incumbent re-elected.	▌ ✓ Ernest F. Acheson (Republican) 49.2%; ▌ Robert K. Aiken (Democratic/Lincoln) 45.0%; ▌ John W. Slayton (Socialist) 3.2%; ▌ Louis Van Orden (Prohibition) 2.7%
Pennsylvania 25	Arthur L. Bates	Republican	1900	Incumbent re-elected.	▌ ✓ Arthur L. Bates (Republican) 60.6%; ▌ Andrew J. Palm (Democratic) 36.2%; ▌ Joshua Wanhope (Socialist) 3.2%
Pennsylvania 26	Gustav A. Schneebeli	Republican	1904	Incumbent lost re-election. Democratic gain.	▌ ✓ Joseph Davis Brodhead (Democratic/Lincoln) 54.3%; ▌ Gustav A. Schneebeli (Republican) 43.9%; ▌ John Wilhelm (Prohibition) 1.8%
Pennsylvania 27	William Orlando Smith	Republican	1902	Incumbent retired. Republican hold.	▌ ✓ Joseph Grant Beale (Republican) 58.3%; ▌ S. C. Hepler (Democratic) 36.2%; ▌ Enoch McGary (Prohibition) 5.5%
Pennsylvania 28	Joseph C. Sibley	Republican	1898	Incumbent retired. Republican hold.	▌ ✓ Nelson P. Wheeler (Republican) 52.7%; ▌ Earl Hanley Beshlin (Democratic) 33.2%; ▌ H. E. Horne (Prohibition) 11.8%; ▌ Edward Hayden (Socialist) 2.2%
Pennsylvania 29	William H. Graham	Republican	1904	Incumbent re-elected.	▌ ✓ William H. Graham (Republican/Citizens) 91.8%; ▌ James S. Hastings (Prohibition) 4.6%; ▌ G. T. McConnell (Socialist) 3.6%
Pennsylvania 30	John Dalzell	Republican	1886	Incumbent re-elected.	▌ ✓ John Dalzell (Republican/Citizens) 65.1%; ▌ R. A. Black (Democratic) 30.0%; ▌ Warren Douglass (Prohibition) 2.6%; ▌ W. J. Wright (Socialist) 2.3%
Pennsylvania 31	James F. Burke	Republican	1904	Incumbent re-elected	▌ ✓ James F. Burke (Republican/Citizens) 67.5%; ▌ Frank Lackner (Democratic) 29.0%; ▌ D. S. Connors (Socialist) 1.8%; ▌ W. A. Stewart (Prohibition) 1.7%
Pennsylvania 32	Andrew J. Barchfeld	Republican	1904	Incumbent re-elected	▌ ✓ Andrew J. Barchfeld (Republican) 71.4%; ▌ M. C. O'Donovan (Democratic) 22.6%; ▌ Thomas P. Hershberger (Prohibition) 3.2%; ▌ Thomas F. Kennedy (Socialist) 2.8%

== Rhode Island ==
District	Incumbent			This race	
District	Member	Party	First elected	Results	Candidates
Rhode Island 1	Daniel L. D. Granger	Democratic	1902	Incumbent re-elected.	▌ ✓ Daniel L. D. Granger (Democratic) 50.4%; ▌ Elisha Dyer Jr. (Republican) 48.0%; ▌ Willis H. White (Prohibition) 0.9%; ▌ J. E. Arnold (Socialist) 0.7%
Rhode Island 2	Adin B. Capron	Republican	1896	Incumbent re-elected.	▌ ✓ Adin B. Capron (Republican) 53.0%; ▌ Lucius F. C. Garvin (Democratic) 45.5%; ▌ Burlington M. Briggs (Prohibition) 1.0%; ▌ Stanley Curtis (Socialist) 0.5%

== South Carolina ==
District	Incumbent	Party	First elected	Result	Candidates
South Carolina 1	George Swinton Legaré	Democratic	1902	Incumbent re-elected.	▌ ✓ George Swinton Legaré (Democratic) 99.3%; ▌Aaron P. Prioleau (Republican) 0.7%
South Carolina 2	James O. Patterson	Democratic	1904	Incumbent re-elected.	▌ ✓ James O. Patterson (Democratic) 95.3%; ▌Isaac Myers (Republican) 4.7%
South Carolina 3	Wyatt Aiken	Democratic	1902	Incumbent re-elected.	▌ ✓ Wyatt Aiken (Democratic) 100%
South Carolina 4	Joseph T. Johnson	Democratic	1900	Incumbent re-elected.	▌ ✓ Joseph T. Johnson (Democratic) 98.7%; ▌David C. Gist (Republican) 0.9%; Others 0.4%
South Carolina 5	David E. Finley	Democratic	1898	Incumbent re-elected.	▌ ✓ David E. Finley (Democratic) 100%
South Carolina 6	J. Edwin Ellerbe	Democratic	1904	Incumbent re-elected.	▌ ✓ J. Edwin Ellerbe (Democratic) 100%
South Carolina 7	A. Frank Lever	Democratic	1901 (special)	Incumbent re-elected.	▌ ✓ A. Frank Lever (Democratic) 97.6%; ▌Aaron D. Dantzler (Republican) 2.4%

== South Dakota ==
District	Incumbent			This race	
District	Member	Party	First elected	Results	Candidates
South Dakota at-large (2 seats elected on a general ticket)	Charles H. Burke	Republican	1898	Incumbent lost renomination. Republican hold.	▌ ✓ Philo Hall (Republican) 32.61%; ▌ ✓ William H. Parker (Republican) 32.59%; ▌William S. Elder (Democratic) 13.57%; ▌Samuel A. Ramsey (Democratic) 13.44%; ▌C. V. Templeton (Prohibition) 2.30%; ▌R. J. Day (Prohibition) 2.25%; ▌James Kirwan (Socialist) 1.66%; ▌Henry A. Berge (Socialist) 1.58%
South Dakota at-large (2 seats elected on a general ticket)	Eben Martin	Republican	1900	Incumbent retired to run for U.S. senator. Republican hold.	▌ ✓ Philo Hall (Republican) 32.61%; ▌ ✓ William H. Parker (Republican) 32.59%; ▌William S. Elder (Democratic) 13.57%; ▌Samuel A. Ramsey (Democratic) 13.44%; ▌C. V. Templeton (Prohibition) 2.30%; ▌R. J. Day (Prohibition) 2.25%; ▌James Kirwan (Socialist) 1.66%; ▌Henry A. Berge (Socialist) 1.58%

== Tennessee ==
District	Incumbent			This race	
District	Member	Party	First elected	Results	Candidates
Tennessee 1	Walter P. Brownlow	Republican	1896	Incumbent re-elected.	▌ ✓ Walter P. Brownlow (Republican) 52.12%; ▌John H. Coldwell (Democratic) 27.63%; ▌Alfred A. Taylor (Independent Republican) 20.25%
Tennessee 2	Nathan W. Hale	Republican	1904	Incumbent re-elected.	▌ ✓ Nathan W. Hale (Republican) 71.49%; ▌E. L. Foster (Democratic) 26.52%; ▌J. A. Broughton (Socialist) 2.00%
Tennessee 3	John A. Moon	Democratic	1896	Incumbent re-elected.	▌ ✓ John A. Moon (Democratic) 56.85%; ▌T. W. Peace (Republican) 42.15%; ▌A. Ellyson (Socialist) 1.01%
Tennessee 4	Mounce G. Butler	Democratic	1904	Incumbent lost renomination. Democratic hold.	▌ ✓ Cordell Hull (Democratic) 53.60%; ▌John E. Oliver (Republican) 46.25%; ▌J. T. McColgan (Socialist) 0.14%
Tennessee 5	William C. Houston	Democratic	1904	Incumbent re-elected.	▌ ✓ William C. Houston (Democratic) 71.54%; ▌Tim Wade (Republican) 27.78%; ▌J. H. Baxter (Socialist) 0.69%
Tennessee 6	John W. Gaines	Democratic	1896	Incumbent re-elected.	▌ ✓ John W. Gaines (Democratic) 79.82%; ▌J. W. Johnson (Republican) 18.97%; ▌H. G. Sneed (Socialist) 1.22%
Tennessee 7	Lemuel P. Padgett	Democratic	1900	Incumbent re-elected.	▌ ✓ Lemuel P. Padgett (Democratic) 68.67%; ▌Joe P. Kidd (Republican) 31.33%
Tennessee 8	Thetus W. Sims	Democratic	1896	Incumbent re-elected.	▌ ✓ Thetus W. Sims (Democratic) 50.68%; ▌John E. McCall (Republican) 49.16%; ▌Clarence Roark (Socialist) 0.16%
Tennessee 9	Finis J. Garrett	Democratic	1904	Incumbent re-elected.	▌ ✓ Finis J. Garrett (Democratic) 76.93%; ▌Yandrell Haun (Republican) 22.92%; ▌W. P. Outlaw (Socialist) 0.15%
Tennessee 10	Malcolm R. Patterson	Democratic	1900	Incumbent retired to run for Governor. Democratic hold.	▌ ✓ George Gordon (Democratic) 95.40%; ▌T. H. Haines (Socialist) 4.61%

== Texas ==
District	Incumbent			This race	
District	Member	Party	First elected	Results	Candidates
Texas 1	Morris Sheppard	Democratic	1902	Incumbent re-elected.	▌ ✓ Morris Sheppard (Democratic) 90.6%; ▌ Phil E. Baer (Republican) 8.5%; ▌ J. C. Thompson (Socialist) 0.9%
Texas 2	Moses L. Broocks	Democratic	1904	Incumbent retired. Democratic hold.	▌ ✓ Samuel B. Cooper (Democratic) 93.0%; ▌ Joseph H. Kurth (Republican) 6.0%; ▌ Charles E. Secord (Socialist) 1.0%
Texas 3	Gordon J. Russell	Democratic	1902	Incumbent re-elected.	▌ ✓ Gordon J. Russell (Democratic) 89.3%; ▌ G. W. L. Smith (Republican) 7.9%; ▌ R. B. Bell (Socialist) 2.8%
Texas 4	Choice B. Randell	Democratic	1900	Incumbent re-elected.	▌ ✓ Choice B. Randell (Democratic) 87.3%; ▌ W. G. McGinnis (Republican) 12.7%
Texas 5	James Andrew Beall	Democratic	1902	Incumbent re-elected	▌ ✓ James Andrew Beall (Democratic) 91.9%; ▌ Archelaus M. Cochran (Republican) 5.3%; ▌ M. T. Connor (Ind. Republican) 5.3%; ▌ Virgil Pittman (Socialist) 0.6%
Texas 6	Scott Field	Democratic	1902	Incumbent retired. Democratic hold.	▌ ✓ Rufus Hardy (Democratic) 92.1%; ▌ Thomas S. Henderson (Prohibition) 3.1%; ▌ John T. Adkisson (Ind. Democratic) 2.8%; ▌ Richard Mays (Ind. Democratic) 1.9%
Texas 7	Alexander W. Gregg	Democratic	1902	Incumbent re-elected	▌ ✓ Alexander W. Gregg (Democratic) 100%
Texas 8	John M. Moore	Democratic	1905	Incumbent re-elected.	▌ ✓ John M. Moore (Democratic) 84.3%; ▌ W. A. Matthai (Republican) 15.7%
Texas 9	George F. Burgess	Democratic	1900	Incumbent re-elected	▌ ✓ George F. Burgess (Democratic) 75.6%; ▌ A. M. Waugh (Republican) 22.4%; ▌ J. B. Gay (Socialist) 2.0%
Texas 10	Albert S. Burleson	Democratic	1898	Incumbent re-elected	▌ ✓ Albert S. Burleson (Democratic) 88.6%; ▌ Carl Beck (Republican) 11.4%
Texas 11	Robert L. Henry	Democratic	1896	Incumbent re-elected	▌ ✓ Robert L. Henry (Democratic) 100%
Texas 12	Oscar W. Gillespie	Democratic	1902	Incumbent re-elected.	▌ ✓ Oscar W. Gillespie (Democratic) 95.6%; ▌ Laura B. Payne (Socialist) 4.4%
Texas 13	John H. Stephens	Democratic	1896	Incumbent re-elected	▌ ✓ John H. Stephens (Democratic) 90.0%; ▌ E. E. Diggs (Republican) 8.3%; ▌ Joseph Schmidt (Socialist) 1.6%
Texas 14	James L. Slayden	Democratic	1896	Incumbent re-elected	▌ ✓ James L. Slayden (Democratic) 80.1%; ▌ D. Doole (Republican) 19.9%
Texas 15	John Nance Garner	Democratic	1902	Incumbent re-elected	▌ ✓ John Nance Garner (Democratic) 63.7%; ▌ T. W. Moore (Republican) 36.3%
Texas 16	William R. Smith	Democratic	1902	Incumbent re-elected	▌ ✓ William R. Smith (Democratic) 92.0%; ▌ Ben Van Tuyl (Republican) 5.3%; ▌ J. M. Ellis (Socialist) 2.7%

== Utah ==
District	Incumbent			This race	
District	Member	Party	First elected	Results	Candidates
Utah at-large	Joseph Howell	Republican	1902	Incumbent re-elected.	▌ ✓ Joseph Howell (Republican) 50.1%; ▌ Orlando W. Powers (Democratic) 33.0%; ▌ Thomas Weir (American) 13.4%; ▌ A. P. Burt (Socialist) 3.5%

== Vermont ==
District	Incumbent			This race	
District	Member	Party	First elected	Results	Candidates
Vermont 1	David J. Foster	Republican	1900	Incumbent re-elected.	▌ ✓ David J. Foster (Republican) 69.0%; ▌Edwin B. Clift (Democratic) 29.9%; ▌Wellington G. Scofield (Prohibition) 1.1%
Vermont 2	Kittredge Haskins	Republican	1900	Incumbent re-elected.	▌ ✓ Kittredge Haskins (Republican) 71.5%; ▌John H. Senter (Democratic) 26.3%; ▌Joseph W. Dunbar (Socialist) 1.1%; ▌Clarence B. Wilson (Prohibition) 1.0%

== Virginia ==
District	Incumbent			This race	
District	Member	Party	First elected	Results	Candidates
Virginia 1	William A. Jones	Democratic	1890	Incumbent re-elected.	▌ ✓ William A. Jones (Democratic) 81.7%; ▌R. S. Bristow (Republican) 18.3%
Virginia 2	Harry L. Maynard	Democratic	1900	Incumbent re-elected.	▌ ✓ Harry L. Maynard (Democratic) 74.5%; ▌Floyd Hughes (Republican) 25.5%
Virginia 3	John Lamb	Democratic	1896	Incumbent re-elected.	▌ ✓ John Lamb (Democratic) 82.2%; ▌G. H. Hanson (Republican) 13.4%; ▌J. B. Johnson (Independent) 4.1%; ▌Thomas A. Hollins (Socialist) 0.3%
Virginia 4	Robert G. Southall	Democratic	1902	Incumbent retired. Democratic hold.	▌ ✓ Francis R. Lassiter (Democratic) 100%
Virginia 5	Edward W. Saunders	Democratic	1906 (special)	Incumbent re-elected.	▌ ✓ Edward W. Saunders (Democratic) 50.9%; ▌John W. Simmons (Republican) 49.1%
Virginia 6	Carter Glass	Democratic	1901 (special)	Incumbent re-elected.	▌ ✓ Carter Glass (Democratic) 74.8%; ▌Charles A. Heermans (Republican) 24.6%; ▌[FNU] Harvey (Socialist) 0.3%
Virginia 7	James Hay	Democratic	1896	Incumbent re-elected.	▌ ✓ James Hay (Democratic) 70.1%; ▌F. E. Beecher (Republican) 29.9%
Virginia 8	John Franklin Rixey	Democratic	1896	Incumbent re-elected.	▌ ✓ John Franklin Rixey (Democratic) 84.0%; ▌[FNU] Henderson (Republican) 16.0%
Virginia 9	Campbell Slemp	Republican	1902	Incumbent re-elected.	▌ ✓ Campbell Slemp (Republican) 54.0%; ▌Robert P. Bruce (Democratic) 46.0%
Virginia 10	Henry D. Flood	Democratic	1900	Incumbent re-elected.	▌ ✓ Henry D. Flood (Democratic) 68.9%; ▌E. D. Gregory (Republican) 31.1%

== Washington ==
District	Incumbent			This race	
District	Member	Party	First elected	Results	Candidates
Washington at-large (3 seats elected on a general ticket)	Wesley L. Jones	Republican	1898	Incumbent re-elected.	▌ ✓ Wesley L. Jones (Republican) 21.1%; ▌ ✓ Francis W. Cushman (Republican) 21.0%; ▌ ✓ William E. Humphrey (Republican) 20.9%; ▌ William Blackman (Democratic) 9.3%; ▌ Patrick S. Byrne (Democratic) 9.0%; ▌ Dudley Eshlemen (Democratic) 8.9%; ▌ Emil Herman (Socialist) 2.5%; ▌ J. H. Barkley (Socialist) 2.5%; ▌ Alfred Wagenknecht (Socialist) 2.5%; ▌ J. M. Wilkin (Prohibition) 0.8%; ▌ Arthur S. Caton (Prohibition) 0.8%; ▌ William Everett (Prohibition) 0.8%
Washington at-large (3 seats elected on a general ticket)	Francis W. Cushman	Republican	1898	Incumbent re-elected.	▌ ✓ Wesley L. Jones (Republican) 21.1%; ▌ ✓ Francis W. Cushman (Republican) 21.0%; ▌ ✓ William E. Humphrey (Republican) 20.9%; ▌ William Blackman (Democratic) 9.3%; ▌ Patrick S. Byrne (Democratic) 9.0%; ▌ Dudley Eshlemen (Democratic) 8.9%; ▌ Emil Herman (Socialist) 2.5%; ▌ J. H. Barkley (Socialist) 2.5%; ▌ Alfred Wagenknecht (Socialist) 2.5%; ▌ J. M. Wilkin (Prohibition) 0.8%; ▌ Arthur S. Caton (Prohibition) 0.8%; ▌ William Everett (Prohibition) 0.8%
Washington at-large (3 seats elected on a general ticket)	William E. Humphrey	Republican	1902	Incumbent re-elected.	▌ ✓ Wesley L. Jones (Republican) 21.1%; ▌ ✓ Francis W. Cushman (Republican) 21.0%; ▌ ✓ William E. Humphrey (Republican) 20.9%; ▌ William Blackman (Democratic) 9.3%; ▌ Patrick S. Byrne (Democratic) 9.0%; ▌ Dudley Eshlemen (Democratic) 8.9%; ▌ Emil Herman (Socialist) 2.5%; ▌ J. H. Barkley (Socialist) 2.5%; ▌ Alfred Wagenknecht (Socialist) 2.5%; ▌ J. M. Wilkin (Prohibition) 0.8%; ▌ Arthur S. Caton (Prohibition) 0.8%; ▌ William Everett (Prohibition) 0.8%

== West Virginia ==
District	Incumbent			This race	
District	Member	Party	First elected	Results	Candidates
West Virginia 1	Blackburn B. Dovener	Republican	1894	Incumbent lost renomination. Republican hold.	▌ ✓ William P. Hubbard (Republican) 52.47%; ▌T. S. Riley (Democratic) 41.50%; ▌W. E. Pierce (Prohibition) 4.02%; ▌E. B. Hibbs (Socialist) 2.00%
West Virginia 2	Thomas B. Davis	Democratic	1905 (special)	Incumbent retired. Republican gain.	▌ ✓ George C. Sturgiss (Republican) 53.63%; ▌M. H. Dent (Democratic) 44.00%; ▌James H. Ward (Prohibition) 1.92%; ▌W. T. Dadisman (Socialist) 0.45%
West Virginia 3	Joseph H. Gaines	Republican	1900	Incumbent re-elected.	▌ ✓ Joseph H. Gaines (Republican) 52.78%; ▌George Byrne (Democratic) 41.08%; ▌Fred H. Montgomery (Prohibition) 3.55%; ▌J. L. Beard (Socialist) 2.59%
West Virginia 4	Harry C. Woodyard	Republican	1902	Incumbent re-elected.	▌ ✓ Harry C. Woodyard (Republican) 52.17%; ▌George W. Hardman (Democratic) 43.89%; ▌Dave D. Johnson (Prohibition) 2.29%; ▌C. W. Kirkendall (Socialist) 1.65%
West Virginia 5	James A. Hughes	Republican	1900	Incumbent re-elected.	▌ ✓ James A. Hughes (Republican) 57.57%; ▌Joseph S. Miller (Democratic) 41.06%; Others: ▌B. F. Morris (Prohibition) 0.87%; ▌Asa Barringer (Socialist) 0.51%

== Wisconsin ==
Wisconsin elected eleven members of congress on Election Day, November 6, 1906.

District	Incumbent			This race	
District	Member	Party	First elected	Results	Candidates
Wisconsin 1	Henry Allen Cooper	Republican	1892	Incumbent re-elected.	▌ ✓ Henry Allen Cooper (Republican) 61.1%; ▌John J. Cunningham (Democratic) 33.2%; ▌Moses Hull (Social Dem.) 5.7%
Wisconsin 2	John M. Nelson	Republican	1906^{(special)}	Incumbent re-elected.	▌ ✓ John M. Nelson (Republican) 51.5%; ▌George W. Levis (Democratic) 44.8%; ▌William L. Dibble (Prohibition) 2.5%; ▌W. A. Hall Sr. (Social Dem.) 1.2%
Wisconsin 3	Joseph W. Babcock	Republican	1892	Incumbent lost re-election. Democratic gain.	▌ ✓ James W. Murphy (Democratic) 50.1%; ▌Joseph W. Babcock (Republican) 46.6%; ▌Herbert J. Noyes (Prohibition) 3.2%
Wisconsin 4	Theobald Otjen	Republican	1894	Incumbent lost re-nomination. Republican hold.	▌ ✓ William J. Cary (Republican) 41.3%; ▌Edmund T. Melms (Social Dem.) 29.5%; ▌Thomas J. Fleming (Democratic) 29.2%
Wisconsin 5	William H. Stafford	Republican	1902	Incumbent re-elected.	▌ ✓ William H. Stafford (Republican) 44.3%; ▌Albert J. Welch (Social Dem.) 28.1%; ▌Joseph G. Donnelly (Democratic) 26.0%; ▌Charles F. Everett (Prohibition) 1.6%
Wisconsin 6	Charles H. Weisse	Democratic	1902	Incumbent re-elected.	▌ ✓ Charles H. Weisse (Democratic) 63.3%; ▌Alvin Dreger (Republican) 34.2%; ▌George C. Damrow (Prohibition) 2.5%
Wisconsin 7	John J. Esch	Republican	1898	Incumbent re-elected.	▌ ✓ John J. Esch (Republican) 72.7%; ▌Charles F. Hille (Democratic) 27.3%
Wisconsin 8	James H. Davidson	Republican	1896	Incumbent re-elected.	▌ ✓ James H. Davidson (Republican) 59.7%; ▌John E. McMuller (Democratic) 33.8%; ▌John J. Pitz (Social Dem.) 3.9%; ▌Charles H. Forward (Prohibition) 2.5%; ▌William B. Minnahan (Ind. Republican) 0.2%
Wisconsin 9	Edward S. Minor	Republican	1894	Incumbent lost re-nomination. Republican hold.	▌ ✓ Gustav Küstermann (Republican) 60.5%; ▌Philip A. Badour (Democratic) 37.1%; ▌Joseph E. Harris (Social Dem.) 2.3%
Wisconsin 10	Webster E. Brown	Republican	1900	Incumbent retired. Republican hold.	▌ ✓ Elmer A. Morse (Republican) 63.6%; ▌Dennis D. Conway (Democratic) 33.5%; ▌James I. Coxe (Social Dem.) 2.9%
Wisconsin 11	John J. Jenkins	Republican	1894	Incumbent re-elected.	▌ ✓ John J. Jenkins (Republican) 74.9%; ▌Francis J. Maguire (Democratic) 20.3%; ▌Charles W. Swanson (Social Dem.) 4.8%

== Wyoming ==
District	Incumbent			This race	
District	Member	Party	First elected	Results	Candidates
Wyoming at-large	Frank W. Mondell	Republican	1898	Incumbent re-elected.	▌ ✓ Frank W. Mondell (Republican) 62.16%; ▌John C. Hamm (Democratic) 33.07%; ▌William Brown (Socialist) 4.57%; ▌C. H. Nicodemus (Prohibition) 0.21%

== Non-voting delegates ==
=== District of Alaska ===
District	Incumbent			Results	Candidates
District	Senator	Party	First elected	Results	Candidates
Alaska Territory at-large	Frank Hinman Waskey	Independent	1906	Incumbent retired. Independent hold.	▌ ✓ Thomas Cale (Independent); [data missing]

=== New Mexico Territory ===
New Mexico Territory elected its non-voting delegate November 6, 1906.

District	Incumbent			This race	
District	Representative	Party	First elected	Results	Candidates
New Mexico Territory at-large	William Henry Andrews	Republican	1904	Incumbent re-elected.	▌ ✓ William Henry Andrews (Republican); ▌Octaviano Ambrosio Larrazolo (Democratic)

== See also ==
- 1906 United States elections
- 1906–07 United States Senate elections
- 59th United States Congress
- 60th United States Congress

== Bibliography ==
- Dubin, Michael J. (March 1, 1998). United States Congressional Elections, 1788-1997: The Official Results of the Elections of the 1st Through 105th Congresses. McFarland and Company. ISBN 978-0786402830.
- Martis, Kenneth C. (January 1, 1989). The Historical Atlas of Political Parties in the United States Congress, 1789-1989. Macmillan Publishing Company. ISBN 978-0029201701.
- Moore, John L., ed. (1994). Congressional Quarterly's Guide to U.S. Elections (Third ed.). Congressional Quarterly Inc. ISBN 978-0871879967.
- "Party Divisions of the House of Representatives* 1789–Present". Office of the Historian, House of United States House of Representatives.
- Secretary of State (1907). Maryland Manual 1906. Baltimore: Wm. J. C. Dulany Co.
