= Clyde H. Tavenner =

American politician and publisher (1882-1942)

Clyde Howard Tavenner
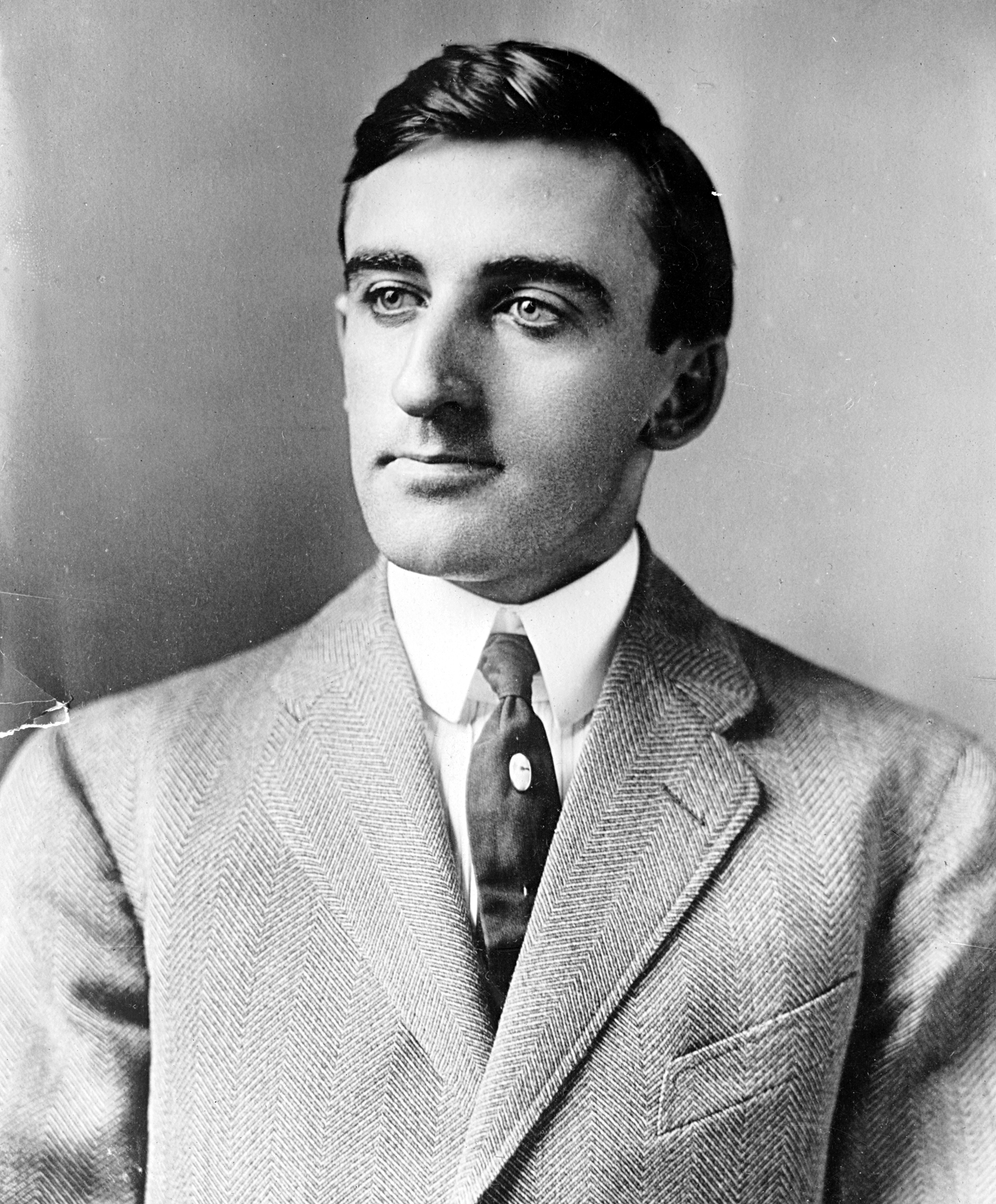

Member of the U.S. House of Representatives from Illinois's 14th district
- In office March 4, 1913 – March 3, 1917
- Preceded by: James McKinney
- Succeeded by: William J. Graham

Personal details
- Born: February 4, 1882 Cordova, Illinois, U.S.
- Died: February 6, 1942 (aged 60) Washington, D.C., U.S.
- Resting place: Congressional Cemetery, Washington, D.C., U.S.
- Party: Democratic

Clyde Howard Tavenner (February 4, 1882 – February 6, 1942) was an American politician and publisher who served as a U.S. representative from Illinois's 14th congressional district from 1913 to 1917.

== Early life ==
Tavenner was born in Cordova, Illinois, on February 4, 1882. He attended the public schools of Cordova and engaged in the printing trade starting at the age of eight starting his career as a newspaper sales boy and type setter. At age 14, Tavenner starting printing a small paper titled The Boys’ Bulletin.

== Career ==
He moved to Chicago and began writing for the City Press Association gaining wide spread praise for his honest credibility across the city. He moved to Washington, D.C., as a political correspondent for the Rock Island Argus writing letters known as “Tav’s Articles” which had been circulated to over 1200 newspapers all across the nation from the Pacific coast to the Atlantic coast. In 1910 he was hired by Democratic congressional leader Champ Clark as director of publicity for the Democratic Congressional Campaign Committee. In 1910, he won the nomination for U.S. Congress from Illinois's 14th congressional district. In the past the district voted heavily Republican but in 1910 Tavenner waged an energetic campaign for the seat. He had the support and backing of Champ Clark and other prominent Democrats in Washington. Tavenner successfully challenged the Republican incumbent James McKinney on his vote in favor of the Payne–Aldrich Tariff Act, which produced high tariff rates on goods entering the country and angered many members of the Republican Party who felt that tariff rates should be lower. Despite his efforts, Tavenner lost the election by a close margin.

In early-1912, Tavenner announced that he would again seek the Democratic nomination for Congress after Congressman McKinney announced that he would not seek another term in the House. Tavenner won the nomination over Dr. John P. Riggs of Media, Illinois. The Republicans nominated a Rock Island, Illinois, businessman and former city alderman Charles J. Searle. Searle was seen as a popular favorite to win the election due to the districts strong Republican leanings but Searle refused the support of the progressive wing of the Republican Party which turned its support to Tavenner. Tavenner used his experience as a journalist to his advantage writing brief bulletins titled "Tavenner’s Daily Bulletin" that appeared in every daily newspaper in the district explaining his experience as the best candidate for the office. He pledged to reduce taxes, reduce tariff rates and used his experience as a Washington insider. Tavenner's wife was also an active campaigner on her husband's behalf during the campaign. In November, Tavenner benefitted from the Democratic sweep that granted the Democrats the control of the House of Representatives and the presidency. He was the first Democrat since 1892 to be elected from the district. He was reelected to a second term in 1914 by a wider margin due to the split in the Republican Party between tradition Republicans and progressive Republicans.

Once in the House, Tavenner fought against big business interests and monopolies as well as wasteful government spending, making speeches and lectures against governmental corruption all across the United States. He served as chairman of the Committee on Expenditures in the Post Office Department (Sixty-fourth Congress). In November 1916 Tavenner fell victim to a Republican resurgence in Northwestern Illinois and was defeated for a third term by attorney William J. Graham of Aledo, Illinois. In retirement, Tavenner supported the U.S. effort in World War I and resumed his publishing business. He founded a monthly magazine, the Philippine Republic, in Washington, D.C., in 1923. He visited Europe, the Near East, and the Far East in 1931 and 1932 was a member of a mission from the Philippine Islands. He also served as a legislative analyst to the House Committee on Rules in 1939.

== Death ==
Tavenner died on February 6, 1942, in Washington, D.C., and was interred in the Congressional Cemetery.

== Election history ==
Election of November 8, 1910, U.S. House
R. James McKinney – 17,004 52%
D. Clyde Tavenner – 12,980 40%
S. Milton L. Morrill – 1,658 5%
Pro. Samuel S. Chapman – 852 3%

Election of November 5, 1912, U.S. House
D. Clyde Tavenner – 17,024 47%
R. Charles J. Searle – 15,816 44%
S. Charles Block – 2,466 7%
Pro. Parkhurst W. Cutler – 680 2%

Election of November 3, 1914, U.S. House
D. Clyde Tavenner – 17,221 44%
R. Frank Abbey – 16,132 41%
Prog. Henry E. Burgess – 4,272 11%
S. Edgar Owens – 1,465 4%

Election of November 7, 1916, U.S. House
R. William J. Graham – 23,099 48%
D. Clyde Tavenner – 22,591 47%
S. Nick S. Dexter – 1,864 4%
Prog. Cloyd E. Kaufman – 91 0%

U.S. House of Representatives
Preceded by James McKinney	Member of the U.S. House of Representatives from Illinois's 14th congressional district 1913–1917	Succeeded by William J. Graham
