= James McKinney =

American politician (1852–1934)

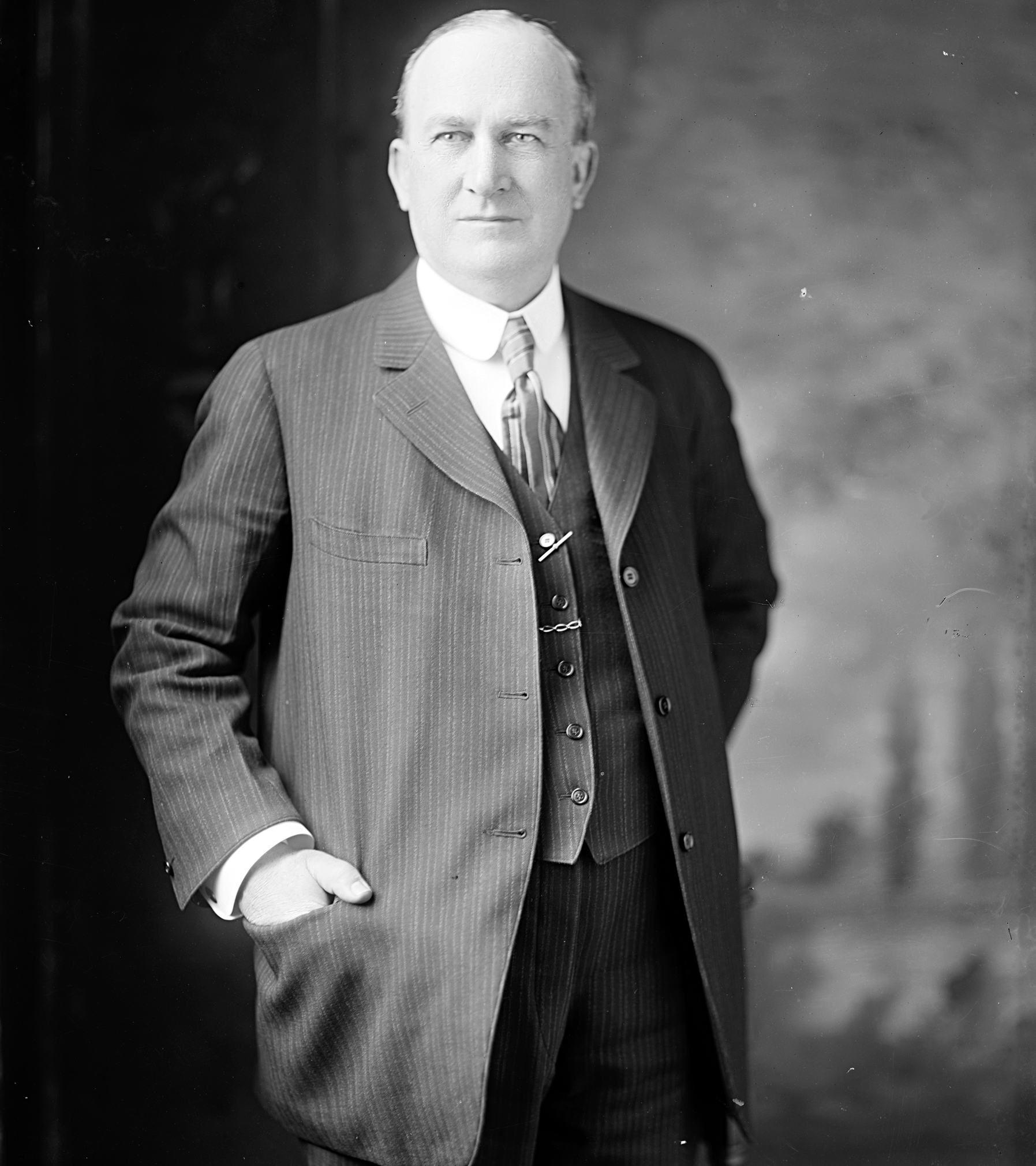
- McKinney, 1905–1934

Member of the U.S. House of Representatives from Illinois's 14th district
- In office November 7, 1905 – March 3, 1913
- Preceded by: Benjamin F. Marsh
- Succeeded by: Clyde Howard Tavenner

Personal details
- Born: April 14, 1852 Oquawka, Illinois
- Died: September 29, 1934 (aged 82) Aledo, Illinois
- Party: Republican
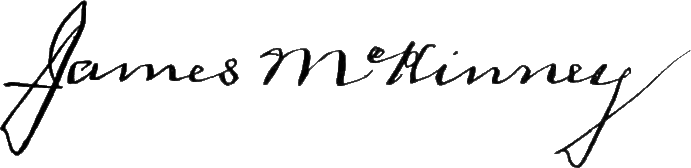
- Signature

James McKinney (April 14, 1852 – September 29, 1934) was a U.S. representative from Illinois.

== Biography ==
Born in Oquawka, Illinois, McKinney attended the public schools of Lewis County High School and was given the nickname of "Downey" from his friends. He served as president of the Aledo (Illinois) Bank 1892-1907. He served as a member of the Republican State central committee 1894-1906. He served as a delegate to the Republican State convention in 1896 and 1900. He was appointed by Governor Yates in 1901 a member of the State railroad and warehouse commission, but resigned in 1902. He served as president of the Aledo Board of Education in 1902 and 1903.

McKinney was elected as a Republican to the Fifty-ninth Congress in 1905 to fill the vacancy caused by the death of Benjamin F. Marsh. He was re-elected in 1906, 1908, and 1910, and served from November 7, 1905, to March 3, 1913. He did not seek re-election in 1912. He served as president of the Illinois State Bankers' Association in 1908 and 1909. He engaged in the real estate loan business in Aledo, Illinois, until his death in that city on September 29, 1934. He was interred in Aledo Cemetery.

U.S. House of Representatives
| Preceded by Benjamin F. Marsh | Member of the U.S. House of Representatives from Illinois's 14th congressional district November 7, 1905 – March 3, 1913 | Succeeded by Clyde H. Tavenner |
