= 1905 Illinois's 14th congressional district special election =

- November 7, 1905

Illinois's 14th congressional district
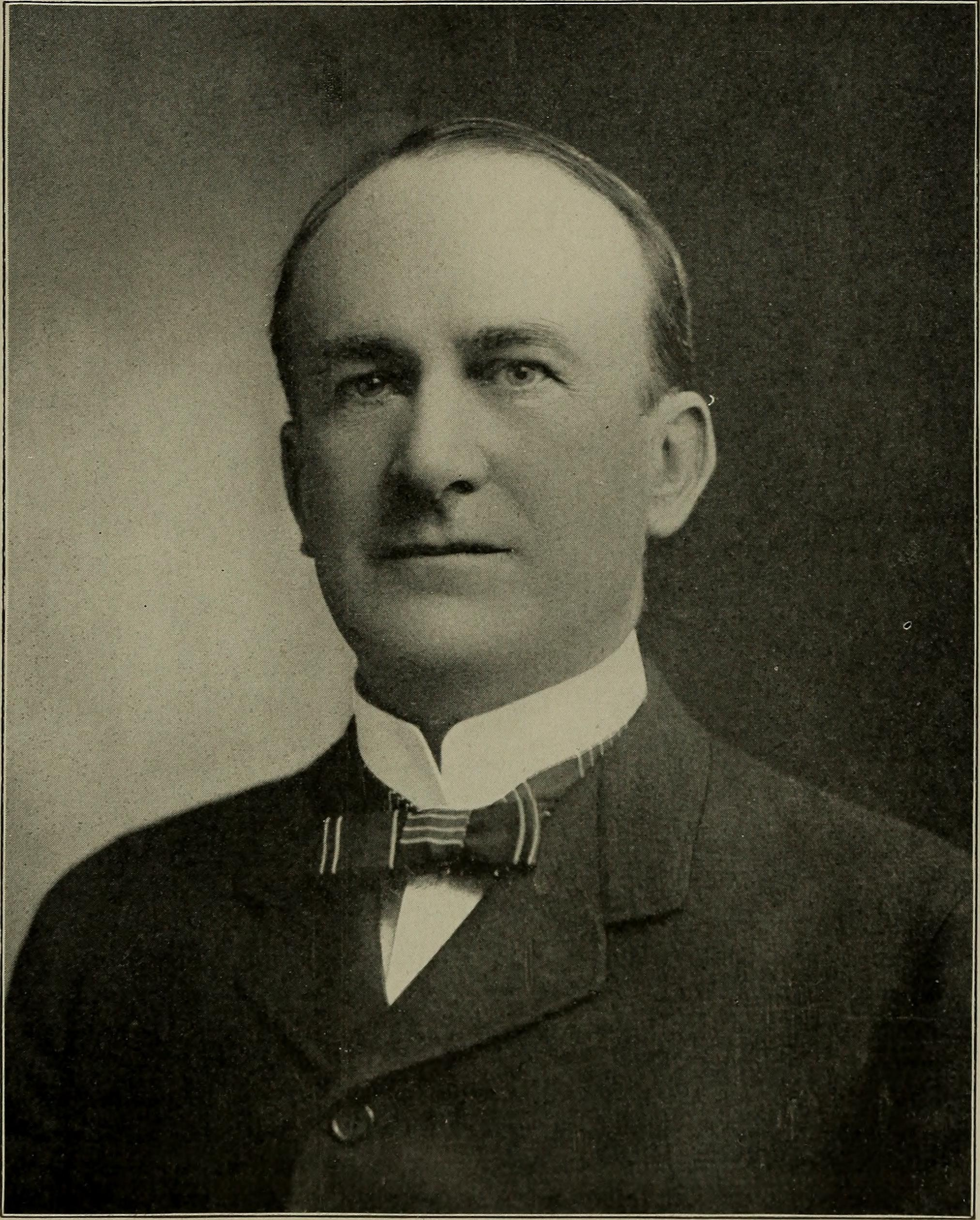
Candidate	James McKinney	James Howard Pattee
Party	Republican	Democratic
Popular vote	12,356	7,316
Percentage	57.19%	33.86%
U.S. Representative before election
Vacant
Elected U.S. Representative
James McKinney
Democratic

The 1905 Illinois's 14th congressional district special election was held on November 7, 1905, and was won by James McKinney, a former state State Railroad and Warehouse Commissioner, who defeated Democratic businessman James Howard Pattee.

== Republican nomination ==
Following the death of Congressman Marsh, Lieutenant Governor Lawrence Y. Sherman was rumored as a potential candidate, but quickly announced that he would not run: "I would not go to Washington. I would rather be a member of the legislature of Illinois than a congressman. I have no use for Washington." While Sherman would have cleared the field of Republican candidates, in the absence of his candidacy, a large number of candidates ran. When Republican delegates convened in Bushnell on August 24, 1905, no candidate had a clear advantage. On the first ballot, businessman Frank G. Allen, the President of the Moline Plow Company, received 41 votes, and no other candidate received more than 20 out of 122 cast. Three of the remaining candidates dropped out of the race and their support went to James McKinney, a former member of the State Railroad and Warehouse Commission, enabling him to win the nomination on the second ballot.

=== Candidates ===
- Clarence R. Gittings, former State Representative
- C. V. Chandler, former State Senator
- George C. Rankin, former State Representative and national bank receiver
- James McKinney, former member of the State Railroad and Warehouse Commission
- Frank G. Allen, President of the Moline Plow Company

=== Results ===
Republican convention ballot
Ballot	1	2
Allen	41	41
Chandler	39	0
McKinney	16	81
Rankin	18	0
Gittings	8	0

== Democratic nomination ==
Delegates from the county parties assembled in Monmouth on September 28, 1905, to select their nominee. As reported by the Macomb Journal, the Chairman of the congressional committee, John Sexton, was alleged to support the independent candidacy of George Washington McCaskrin, the Mayor of Rock Island. After Sexton made nominating speeches for several prospective candidates who indicated that they would decline the nomination, some delegates "charged" that "Sexton's intentions were to get some man nominated who would positively decline to run," which would then empower the congressional committee to "endorse McCaskrin and thus get his name placed on the Democratic ticket."

Ultimately, however, three candidates ran for the nomination. On the first ballot, La Harpe Mayor Charles A. Knappenberger received 28 votes, just shy of the 31 required for the nomination. Newspaper editor Charles C. Chain received 23 votes, and bowed out of the second round, while businessman John Howard Pattee received 10 votes. On the second ballot, Pattee narrowly defeated Knappenberger, receiving 31 votes to Knappenberger's 30.

=== Candidates ===
- Charles C. Chain, editor of the Bushnell Democrat
- Charles A. Knappenberger, Mayor of La Harpe, Illinois
- J. Howard Pattee, President of the Pattee Plow Company

=== Results ===
Democratic convention ballot
Ballot	1	2
Chain	23	0
Knappenberger	28	30
Pattee	10	31

== General election ==
=== Campaign ===
Following the Democratic convention, Rock Island Mayor George Washington McCaskrin filed to run for the nomination. However, following errors in his nomination papers, he ultimately did not contest the race and did not appear on the ballot.

The election between McKinney and Pattee was not expected to be close, but Governor Charles S. Deneen campaigned on McKinney's behalf, and urged local Republicans to support him. He argued that "it was cheap tribute to the work and worth of President Roosevelt to sit back confident in the normal majority of the district to carry the [R]epublican candidate through." Ultimately, McKinney won the election by a wide margin.

=== Results ===
1905 Illinois's 14th congressional district special election
Party	Candidate	Votes	%
Republican	James McKinney	12,356	57.19%
Democratic	James Howard Pattee	7,316	33.86%
Socialist	Homer L. Darby	1,176	5.44%
Prohibition	J. Marion Fort	757	3.50%
Total votes		21,605	100.00%
Republican hold			
