= 1910 United States House of Representatives elections =

House elections for the 62nd U.S. Congress

- November 8, 1910 (Note: Maine and Vermont held elections early, in September 1910.)

All 391 seats in the United States House of Representatives (Note: Including late elections) 196 seats needed for a majority
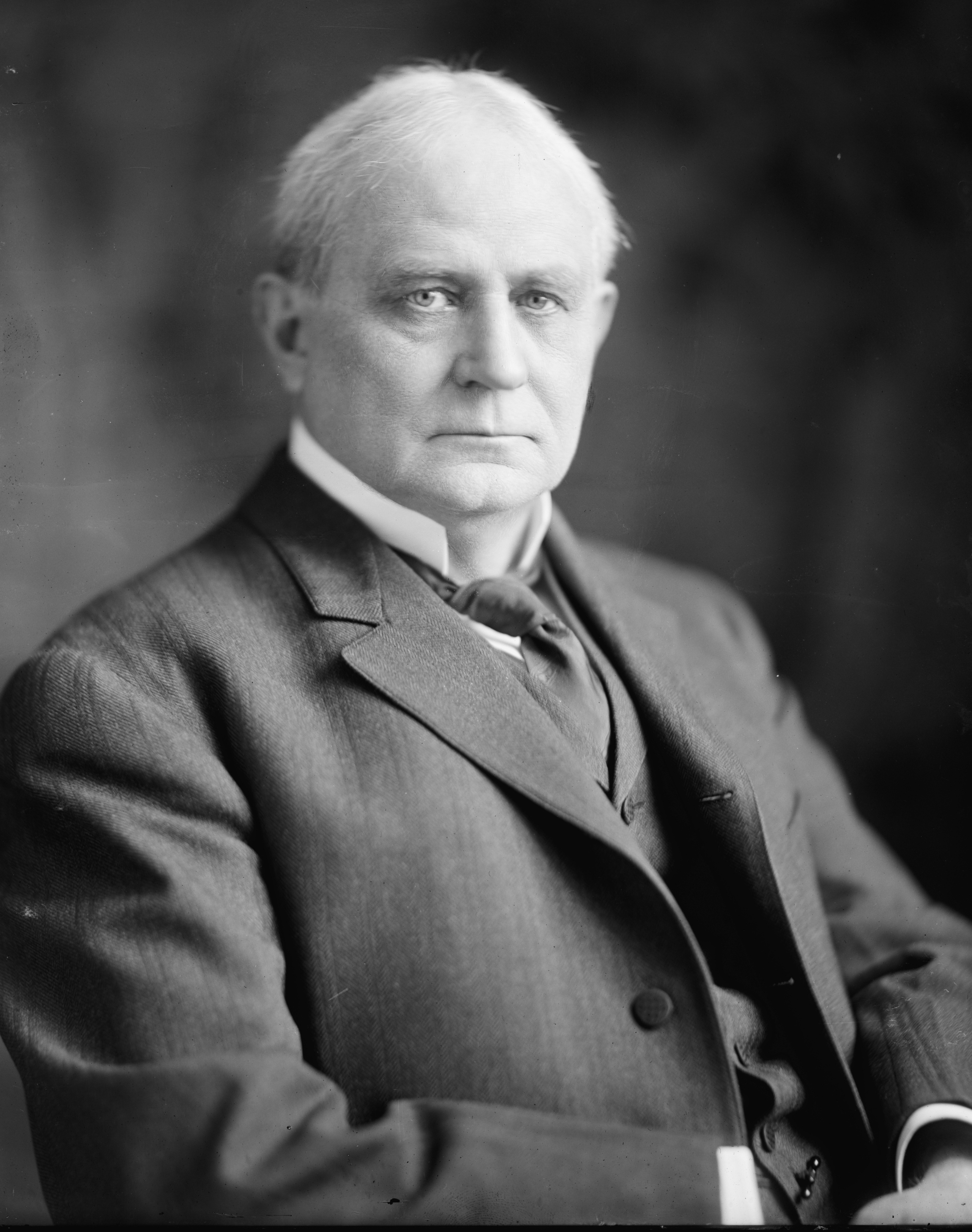

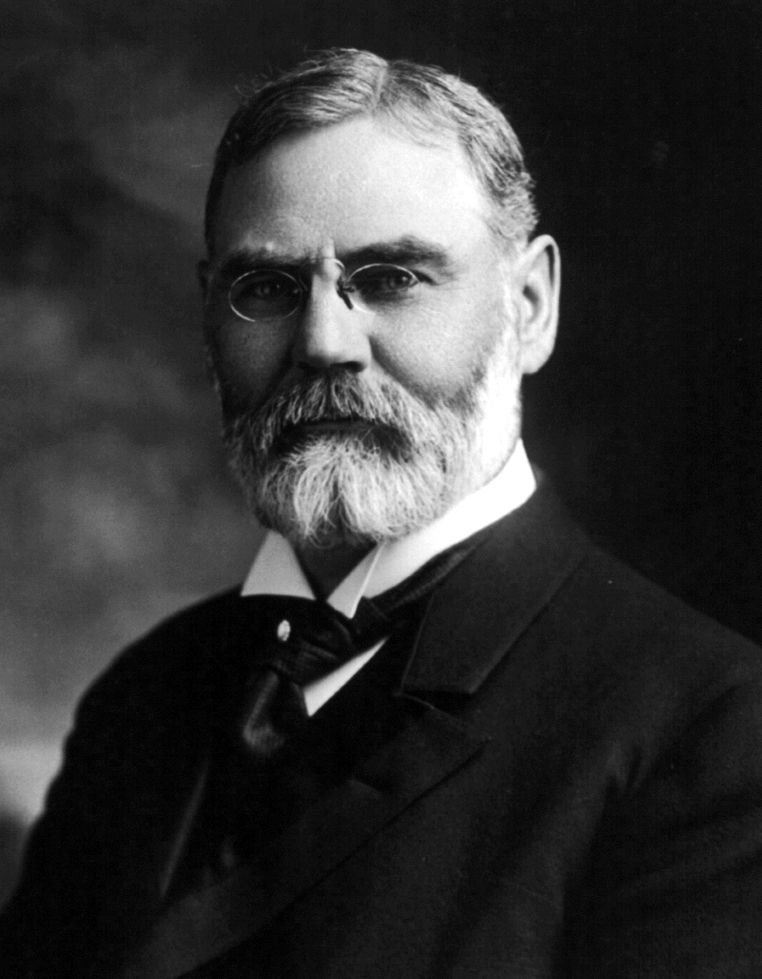
	Majority party	Minority party
Leader	Champ Clark	James Mann
Party	Democratic	Republican
Leader since	March 4, 1909	March 4, 1911
Leader's seat	Missouri 9th	Illinois 2nd
Last election	172 seats	218 seats
Seats won	227 (Note: Does not include 2 members from New Mexico and Arizona, elected from their new states in 1911.)	161 (Note: Does not include 1 member from New Mexico, elected from their new state in 1911)
Seat change	▲55	▼57
Popular vote	5,700,035	5,680,628
Percentage	46.69%	46.53%
Swing	▲1.31pp	▼3.52pp
	Third party	Fourth party
Party	Socialist	Independent
Last election	0 seats	1 seat (Note: Including one Independent Republican.)
Seats won	1	2 (Note: Includes Congressmen Theron Akin of the 25th District of New York, and Samuel Tribble of the 8th District of Georgia.) (Note: Theron Akin had been endorsed by the local Democratic Party in opposition to the Republican incumbent Cyrus Durey, but made known his intention to caucus with the Republican Party as a Progressive Republican upon being sworn in.) (Note: Samuel Tribble ran as an Independent Democrat in opposition to incumbent Congressman William Howard.)
Seat change	▲1	▲1
Popular vote	527,968	57,938
Percentage	4.32%	0.47%
Swing	▲1.94pp	▲0.04pp
- Results: Democratic hold Democratic gain Republican hold Republican gain Independent Gain Socialist gain
Speaker before election
Joseph Cannon
Republican
Elected Speaker
Champ Clark
Democratic

The 1910 United States House of Representatives elections were held for the most part on November 8, 1910, while Maine and Vermont held theirs early in September, in the middle of President William Howard Taft's term. Elections were held for all 391 seats of the United States House of Representatives, representing 46 states, to the 62nd United States Congress

The conservative Taft contended with major factional splits within his Republican Party. Instead of using his position as president to bridge compromise, Taft alienated the progressive wing of the party, which had championed his predecessor, Theodore Roosevelt. While conservatives controlled the largest number of elected positions for Republicans, progressive politics had been what brought many voters to the polls. The clash of these units of the Republican Party, combined with the message of unity from the Democratic Party, was enough to allow the Democrats to take control of the House, ending 16 years in opposition. This was the first time the Socialist Party won a seat.

== Issues ==
Protection was the ideological cement holding the Republican coalition together. High tariffs were used by Republicans to promise higher sales to business, higher wages to industrial workers, and higher demand for their crops to farmers. Progressive insurgents said it promoted monopoly. Democrats said it was a tax on the little man. It had greatest support in the Northeast, and greatest opposition in the South and West. The Midwest was the battleground. The great battle over the high Payne–Aldrich Tariff Act in 1910 ripped the Republicans apart and set up the realignment in favor of the Democrats.

== Election summaries ==
↓
230	2	162
Democratic	(Note: There was 1 Socialist and 1 Progressive Republican)	Republican

State	Type	Total seats	Democratic		Republican		Socialist	
State	Type	Total seats	Seats	Change	Seats	Change	Seats	Change
Alabama	Districts	9	9	Steady	0	Steady	0	Steady
Arkansas	Districts	7	7	Steady	0	Steady	0	Steady
California	Districts	8	1	▲1	7	▼1	0	Steady
Colorado	Districts + at-large	3	3	Steady	0	Steady	0	Steady
Connecticut	Districts + at-large	5	1	▲1	4	▼1	0	Steady
Delaware	At-large	1	0	Steady	1	Steady	0	Steady
Florida	Districts	3	3	Steady	0	Steady	0	Steady
Georgia	Districts	11	11	Steady	0	Steady	0	Steady
Idaho	At-large	1	0	Steady	1	Steady	0	Steady
Illinois	Districts	25	11	▲5	14	▼5	0	Steady
Indiana	Districts	13	12	▲1	1	▼1	0	Steady
Iowa	Districts	11	1	Steady	10	Steady	0	Steady
Kansas	Districts	8	0	Steady	8	Steady	0	Steady
Kentucky	Districts	11	9	▲1	2	▼1	0	Steady
Louisiana	Districts	7	7	Steady	0	Steady	0	Steady
Maine (Note: Elections held early.)	Districts	4	2	▲2	2	▼2	0	Steady
Maryland	Districts	6	5	▲2	1	▼2	0	Steady
Massachusetts	Districts	14	4	▲1	10	▼1	0	Steady
Michigan	Districts	12	2	▲2	10	▼2	0	Steady
Minnesota	Districts	9	1	Steady	8	Steady	0	Steady
Mississippi	Districts	8	8	Steady	0	Steady	0	Steady
Missouri	Districts	16	14	▲4	2	▼4	0	Steady
Montana	At-large	1	0	Steady	1	Steady	0	Steady
Nebraska	Districts	6	3	Steady	3	Steady	0	Steady
Nevada	At-large	1	0	▼1	1	▲1	0	Steady
New Hampshire	Districts	2	0	Steady	2	Steady	0	Steady
New Jersey	Districts	10	7	▲4	3	▼4	0	Steady
New York	Districts	37	22	▲11	15 (Note: Including one Progressive Republican member, Theron Akin)	▼11	0	Steady
North Carolina	Districts	10	10	▲3	0	▼3	0	Steady
North Dakota	Districts	2	0	Steady	2	Steady	0	Steady
Ohio	Districts	21	16	▲8	5	▼8	0	Steady
Oklahoma	Districts	5	3	▲1	2	▼1	0	Steady
Oregon	Districts	2	0	Steady	2	Steady	0	Steady
Pennsylvania	Districts	32	9	▲4	23	▼4	0	Steady
Rhode Island	Districts	2	1	▲1	1	▼1	0	Steady
South Carolina	Districts	7	7	Steady	0	Steady	0	Steady
South Dakota	At-large	2	0	Steady	2	Steady	0	Steady
Tennessee	Districts	10	8	Steady	2	Steady	0	Steady
Texas	Districts	16	16	Steady	0	Steady	0	Steady
Utah	At-large	1	0	Steady	1	Steady	0	Steady
Vermont	Districts	2	0	Steady	2	Steady	0	Steady
Virginia	Districts	10	9	Steady	1	Steady	0	Steady
Washington	Districts	3	0	Steady	3	Steady	0	Steady
West Virginia	Districts	5	4	▲4	1	▼4	0	Steady
Wisconsin	Districts	11	2	▲1	8	▼2	1	▲1
Wyoming	At-large	1	0	Steady	1	Steady	0	Steady
Total		391	228 58.4%	▲56	162 41.4%	▼57	1 0.3%	▲1

Popular vote
Democratic	46.69%
Republican	46.53%
Socialist	4.32%
Independent	0.47%
Others	1.99%

House seats
Democratic	58.06%
Republican	41.18%
Socialist	0.26%
Independent	0.51%

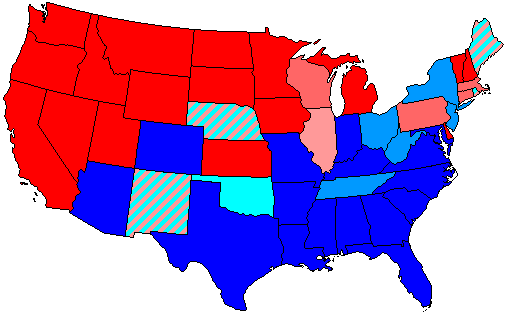
House seats by party holding plurality in state: 80+% Democratic / 80+% Republican; 60+% to 80% Democratic / 60+% to 80% Republican; Up to 60% Democratic / Up to 60% Republican

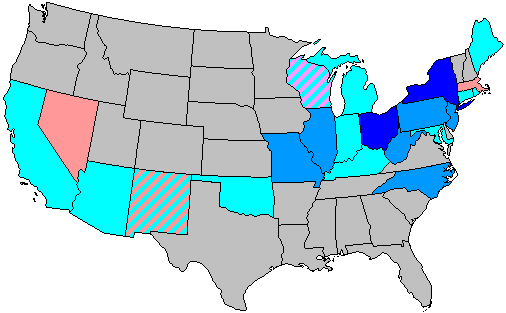
Net gain in party representation: 6+ Democratic gain / / 6+ Republican gain; 3-5 Democratic gain / / 3-5 Republican gain; 1-2 Democratic gain / 1-2 Socialist gain / 1-2 Republican gain; no net change

== Election dates ==
In 1910, two states, with 6 seats between them, held elections early:

- September 6, Vermont
- September 12, Maine

Two newly admitted states held elections late: New Mexico and Arizona held their first elections in 1911.

== Special elections ==
District	Incumbent			This race	
District	Member	Party	First elected	Results	Candidates
Georgia 2
Iowa 9
Louisiana 2	Samuel L. Gilmore	Democratic	1909 (special)	Incumbent died July 18, 1910. New member elected November 8, 1910. Democratic hold. Winner also elected to the next term; see below.	▌ ✓ H. Garland Dupré (Democratic) 82.71%; ▌Victor Loisel (Republican) 17.29%
Massachusetts 4	Charles Q. Tirrell	Republican	1900	Incumbent died July 31, 1910. New member elected November 8, 1910. Democratic gain. Winner lost election to the next term; see below.	▌ ✓ John Joseph Mitchell (Democratic) 50.03%; ▌William Wilder (Republican) 49.96%
Missouri 6
Tennessee 1	Walter P. Brownlow	Republican	1896	Incumbent died July 8, 1910. New member elected November 8, 1910. Republican hold.	▌ ✓ Zachary D. Massey (Republican) 77.35%; ▌Cyrus H. Lyle (Democratic) 22.65%
Virginia 4

== Alabama ==
District	Incumbent	Party	First elected	Result	Candidates
Alabama 1	George W. Taylor	Democratic	1896	Incumbent re-elected.	▌ ✓ George W. Taylor (Democratic) 97.1%; ▌Louis Edelman (Republican) 2%; ▌L. F. Rush (Independent) 0.9%
Alabama 2	S. Hubert Dent Jr.	Democratic	1908	Incumbent re-elected.	▌ ✓ S. Hubert Dent Jr. (Democratic) 100%
Alabama 3	Henry D. Clayton Jr.	Democratic	1896	Incumbent re-elected.	▌ ✓ Henry D. Clayton Jr. (Democratic) 100%
Alabama 4	William B. Craig	Democratic	1906	Incumbent retired. Democratic hold.	▌ ✓ Fred L. Blackmon (Democratic) 69.9%; ▌J. M. Atkins (Republican) 30.1%
Alabama 5	J. Thomas Heflin	Democratic	1904	Incumbent re-elected.	▌ ✓ Henry D. Clayton (Democratic) 100%
Alabama 6	Richmond P. Hobson	Democratic	1906	Incumbent re-elected.	▌ ✓ Richmond P. Hobson (Democratic) 81.5%; ▌Andrew D. Mitchell (Republican) 18.5%
Alabama 7	John L. Burnett	Democratic	1896	Incumbent re-elected.	▌ ✓ John L. Burnett (Democratic) 51.4%; ▌ Milford W. Howard (Republican) 48.6%
Alabama 8	William Richardson	Democratic	1900	Incumbent re-elected.	▌ ✓ William Richardson (Democratic) 98.2%; ▌Jake J. Huber (Republican) 1.9%
Alabama 9	Oscar Underwood	Democratic	1896	Incumbent re-elected.	▌ ✓ Oscar Underwood (Democratic) 100%

== Arkansas ==
District	Incumbent			This race	
District	Member	Party	First elected	Results	Candidates
Arkansas 1	Robert B. Macon	Democratic	1902	Incumbent re-elected.	▌ ✓ Robert B. Macon (Democratic) 100%
Arkansas 2	William A. Oldfield	Democratic	1908	Incumbent re-elected.	▌ ✓ William A. Oldfield (Democratic) 81.7%; ▌ J. T. Hall (Republican) 18.3%
Arkansas 3	John C. Floyd	Democratic	1904	Incumbent re-elected.	▌ ✓ John C. Floyd (Democratic) 55.6%; ▌ B. S. Granger (Republican) 45.5%
Arkansas 4	William B. Cravens	Democratic	1906	Incumbent re-elected.	▌ ✓ William B. Cravens (Democratic) 100%
Arkansas 5	Charles C. Reid	Democratic	1900	Incumbent retired. Democratic hold.	▌ ✓ Henderson M. Jacoway (Democratic) 76.4%; ▌ Augustus Caleb Remmel (Republican) 23.6%
Arkansas 6	Joseph T. Robinson	Democratic	1902	Incumbent re-elected.	▌ ✓ Joseph T. Robinson (Democratic) 81.6%; ▌ B. C. Thompson (Republican) 18.4%
Arkansas 7	Robert M. Wallace	Democratic	1902	Incumbent lost renomination. Democratic hold.	▌ ✓ William S. Goodwin (Democratic) 82.2%; ▌ A. L. Wilson (Republican) 17.8%

== California ==
District	Incumbent			This race	
District	Member	Party	First elected	Results	Candidates
California 1	William F. Englebright	Republican	1906	Incumbent lost re-election. Democratic gain.	▌ ✓ John E. Raker (Democratic) 45.4%; ▌ William F. Englebright (Republican) 45.1%; ▌William Morgan (Socialist) 8.8%; ▌C. H. Essex (Prohibition) 0.7%
California 2	Duncan E. McKinlay	Republican	1904	Incumbent lost renomination. Republican hold.	▌ ✓ William Kent (Republican) 50.1%; ▌I. G. Zumwalt (Democratic) 44.0%; ▌W. H. Ferber (Socialist) 5.2%; ▌Henry P. Stipp (Prohibition) 0.7%
California 3	Joseph R. Knowland	Republican	1904	Incumbent re-elected.	▌ ✓ Joseph R. Knowland (Republican) 81.9%; ▌S. Miller (Socialist) 15.9%; ▌James N. Christian (Prohibition) 2.2%
California 4	Julius Kahn	Republican	1898	Incumbent re-elected.	▌ ✓ Julius Kahn (Republican) 56.5%; ▌}Walter Macarthur (Democratic) 36.8%; ▌Austin Lewis (Socialist) 6.5%; ▌E. F. Dinsmore (Prohibition) 0.2%
California 5	Everis A. Hayes	Republican	1904	Incumbent re-elected.	▌ ✓ Everis A. Hayes (Republican) 59.4%; ▌Thomas E. Hayden (Democratic) 27.4%; ▌E. L. Reguin (Socialist) 12.6%; ▌T. E. Caton (Prohibition) 0.6%
California 6	James C. Needham	Republican	1898	Incumbent re-elected.	▌ ✓ James C. Needham (Republican) 47.3%; ▌A. L. Cowell (Democratic) 44.2%; ▌Richard Kirk (Socialist) 6.2%; ▌Ira E. Surface (Prohibition) 2.3%
California 7	James McLachlan	Republican	1900	Incumbent lost renomination. Republican hold.	▌ ✓ William Stephens (Republican) 58.7%; ▌Lorin A. Handley (Democratic) 21.5%; ▌Thomas W. Williams (Socialist) 16.6%; ▌C. V. LeFontaine (Prohibition) 3.2%
California 8	Sylvester C. Smith	Republican	1904	Incumbent re-elected.	▌ ✓ Sylvester C. Smith (Republican) 50.5%; ▌William G. Irving (Democratic) 33.9%; ▌George A. Garrett (Socialist) 13.1%; ▌James S. Edwards (Prohibition) 2.5%

== Colorado ==
District	Incumbent			This race	
District	Member	Party	First elected	Results	Candidates
Colorado 1	Atterson W. Rucker	Democratic	1908	Incumbent re-elected.	▌ ✓ Atterson W. Rucker (Democratic) 40.8%; ▌James C. Burger (Republican) 38.3%; ▌George John Kindel (Prohibition) 17.3%; ▌J. W. Martin (Socialist) 2.8%
Colorado 2	John A. Martin	Democratic	1908	Incumbent re-elected.	▌ ✓ John A. Martin (Democratic) 48.6%; ▌James A. Orr (Republican) 46.0%; ▌J. W. Smith (Socialist) 3.6%; ▌W. W. Loomis (Prohibition) 1.9%
Colorado at-large	Edward T. Taylor	Democratic	1908	Incumbent re-elected.	▌ ✓ Edward T. Taylor (Democratic) 47.9%; ▌Isaac N. Stevens (Republican) 46.1%; ▌W. C. Bentley (Socialist) 3.9%; ▌Alexander Craise (Prohibition) 2.1%

== Connecticut ==
District	Incumbent			This race	
District	Member	Party	First elected	Results	Candidates
Connecticut 1	E. Stevens Henry	Republican	1894	Incumbent re-elected.	▌ ✓ E. Stevens Henry (Republican) 48.1%; ▌Augustine Lonergan (Democratic) 45.0%; ▌Herbert Beebe (Socialist) 4.6%; Others: ▌Edward E. Agard (Prohibition) 1.5%; ▌Anthony Rossmeisl (Soc. Labor) 0.8%
Connecticut 2	Nehemiah D. Sperry	Republican	1894	Incumbent lost re-election. Democratic gain.	▌ ✓ Thomas L. Reilly (Democratic) 48.7%; ▌Nehemiah D. Sperry (Republican) 43.3%; ▌Julius J. Paecht (Socialist) 6.6%; Others: ▌Thomas R. Thompson (Prohibition) 0.8%; ▌Otto Ruckser (Soc. Labor) 0.7%
Connecticut 3	Edwin W. Higgins	Republican	1905 (special)	Incumbent re-elected.	▌ ✓ Edwin W. Higgins (Republican) 47.8%; ▌Raymond J. Jodoin (Democratic) 47.4%; ▌Edward P. Clarke (Socialist) 2.7%; Others: ▌James M. Young (Prohibition) 1.7%; ▌Louis Weingarth (Soc. Labor) 0.5%
Connecticut 4	Ebenezer J. Hill	Republican	1894	Incumbent re-elected.	▌ ✓ Ebenezer J. Hill (Republican) 48.4%; ▌Lynn W. Wilson (Democratic) 42.5%; ▌Charles T. Peach (Socialist) 7.4%; Others: ▌Elisha Z. Ellis (Prohibition) 0.9%; ▌Edward Pryor (Soc. Labor) 0.8%
Connecticut at-large	John Q. Tilson	Republican	1908	Incumbent re-elected.	▌ ✓ John Q. Tilson (Republican) 47.9%; ▌George P. Ingersoll (Democratic) 44.1%; ▌Samuel E. Beardsley (Socialist) 6.2%; Others: ▌William P. Barstow (Prohibition) 1.1%; ▌Max Feldman (Soc. Labor) 0.7%

== Delaware ==
District	Incumbent			This race	
District	Member	Party	First elected	Results	Candidates
Delaware at-large	William H. Heald	Republican	1908	Incumbent re-elected.	▌ ✓ William H. Heald (Republican) 50.9%; ▌ Robert C. White (Democratic) 46.1%; ▌ Lewis P. Brosius (Prohibition) 1.8%; ▌ Frank A. Houck (Socialist) 1.2%

== Florida ==
District	Incumbent	Party	First elected	Result	Candidates
Florida 1	Stephen M. Sparkman	Democratic	1894	Incumbent re-elected.	▌ ✓ Stephen M. Sparkman (Democratic) 81.8%; ▌C. C. Allen (Socialist) 18.2%
Florida 2	Frank Clark	Democratic	1904	Incumbent re-elected.	▌ ✓ Frank Clark (Democratic) 78.5%; ▌Thomas W. Cox (Socialist) 12.2%; ▌Thomas C. Buddington (Republican) 9.3%
Florida 3	Dannite H. Mays	Democratic	1908	Incumbent re-elected.	▌ ✓ Dannite H. Mays (Democratic) 89.6%; ▌Eric Vonaxelson (Socialist) 10.4%

== Georgia ==
District	Incumbent			This race	
District	Member	Party	First elected	Results	Candidates
Georgia 1	Charles G. Edwards	Democratic	1906	Incumbent re-elected.	▌ ✓ Charles G. Edwards (Democratic) 100%
Georgia 2	Seaborn Roddenbery	Democratic	1910	Incumbent re-elected.	▌ ✓ Seaborn Roddenbery (Democratic) 100%
Georgia 3	Dudley M. Hughes	Democratic	1908	Incumbent re-elected.	▌ ✓ Dudley M. Hughes (Democratic) 100%
Georgia 4	William C. Adamson	Democratic	1896	Incumbent re-elected.	▌ ✓ William C. Adamson (Democratic) 100%
Georgia 5	Leonidas F. Livingston	Democratic	1890	Incumbent retired. Democratic hold.	▌ ✓ William S. Howard (Democratic) 100%
Georgia 6	Charles L. Bartlett	Democratic	1894	Incumbent re-elected.	▌ ✓ Charles L. Bartlett (Democratic) 100%
Georgia 7	Gordon Lee	Democratic	1904	Incumbent re-elected.	▌ ✓ Gordon Lee (Democratic) 75.8%; ▌ Walter Akerman (Republican) 24.2%
Georgia 8	William M. Howard	Democratic	1896	Incumbent lost re-election. Independent Democratic gain.	▌ ✓ Samuel J. Tribble (Independent Democratic) 58.1%; ▌ William M. Howard (Democratic) 41.9%
Georgia 9	Thomas M. Bell	Democratic	1904	Incumbent re-elected.	▌ ✓ Thomas M. Bell (Democratic) 100%
Georgia 10	Thomas W. Hardwick	Democratic	1902	Incumbent re-elected.	▌ ✓ Thomas W. Hardwick (Democratic) 75.3%; ▌ C.E. McGregor (Independent Democratic) 24.7%
Georgia 11	William G. Brantley	Democratic	1896	Incumbent re-elected	▌ ✓ William G. Brantley (Democratic) 100%

== Idaho ==
District	Incumbent			This race	
District	Member	Party	First elected	Results	Candidates
Idaho at-large	Thomas R. Hamer	Republican	1908	Incumbent lost renomination. Republican hold.	▌ ✓ Burton L. French (Republican) 55.44%; ▌A. M. Bowen (Democratic) 38.03%; ▌Rolla Myer (Socialist) 6.53%

== Illinois ==
District	Incumbent			This race	
District	Member	Party	First elected	Results	Candidates
Illinois 1	Martin B. Madden	Republican	1904	Incumbent re-elected.	▌ ✓ Martin B. Madden (Republican) 50.0%; ▌ Michael E. Maher (Democratic) 45.1%; ▌ Joseph H. Greer (Socialist) 3.9%; ▌ H. E. Eckles (Prohibition) 1.0%
Illinois 2	James Robert Mann	Republican	1896	Incumbent re-elected.	▌ ✓ James Robert Mann (Republican) 48.4%; ▌ John Charles Vaughan (Democratic) 45.0%; ▌ J. O. Bentall (Socialist) 6.5%
Illinois 3	William Warfield Wilson	Republican	1902	Incumbent re-elected.	▌ ✓ William Warfield Wilson (Republican) 44.9%; ▌ Fred J. Crowley (Democratic) 44.8%; ▌ J. Clifford Cox (Socialist) 7.9%; ▌ Chase G. Kindred (Prohibition) 2.4%
Illinois 4	James T. McDermott	Democratic	1906	Incumbent re-elected.	▌ ✓ James T. McDermott (Democratic) 62.9%; ▌ Michael G. Walsh (Republican) 28.1%; ▌ Peter Bulthouse (Socialist) 8.0%; ▌ Franklin J. Reed (Prohibition) 1.0%
Illinois 5	Adolph J. Sabath	Democratic	1906	Incumbent re-elected.	▌ ✓ Adolph J. Sabath (Democratic) 71.7%; ▌ Louis H. Clusmann (Republican) 18.2%; ▌ Joseph J. Kral (Socialist) 9.1%; ▌ George H. VanDyke (Prohibition) 1.0%
Illinois 6	William Moxley	Republican	1909	Incumbent lost re-election. Democratic gain.	▌ ✓ Edmund J. Stack (Democratic) 51.1%; ▌ William Moxley (Republican) 38.2%; ▌ George Chant (Socialist) 7.9%; ▌ Joseph P. Ellacott (Prohibition) 2.8%
Illinois 7	Frederick Lundin	Republican	1908	Incumbent lost re-election. Democratic gain.	▌ ✓ Frank Buchanan (Democratic) 43.6%; ▌ Frederick Lundin (Republican) 40.8%; ▌ John Collins (Socialist) 13.6%; ▌ J. F. Gieske (Prohibition) 2.0%
Illinois 8	Thomas Gallagher	Democratic	1908	Incumbent re-elected.	▌ ✓ Thomas Gallagher (Democratic) 58.7%; ▌ Daniel D. Coffey (Republican) 32.8%; ▌ John Drexler (Socialist) 7.8%; ▌ J. W. Cronker (Prohibition) 0.7%
Illinois 9	Henry Sherman Boutell	Republican	1897	Incumbent retired. Democratic gain.	▌ ✓ Lynden Evans (Democratic) 45.7%; ▌ Frederick H. Gansbergen (Republican) 44.0%; ▌ Frank Shiflersmith (Socialist) 9.0%; ▌ J. R. Boynton (Prohibition) 1.3%
Illinois 10	George E. Foss	Republican	1894	Incumbent re-elected.	▌ ✓ George E. Foss (Republican) 47.7%; ▌ Richard J. Finnegan (Democratic) 41.5%; ▌ Robert C. Magisen (Socialist) 8.0%; ▌ Charles O. Boring (Prohibition) 2.8%
Illinois 11	Howard M. Snapp	Republican	1902	Incumbent retired. Republican hold.	▌ ✓ Ira C. Copley (Republican) 57.1%; ▌ Frank O. Hawley (Democratic) 36.0%; ▌ Jonas G. Brooks (Prohibition) 3.5%; ▌ James H. Brower (Socialist) 3.4%
Illinois 12	Charles Eugene Fuller	Republican	1902	Incumbent re-elected.	▌ ✓ Charles Eugene Fuller (Republican) 62.3%; ▌ J. W. Rausch (Democratic) 27.7%; ▌ Thomas Johnson (Socialist) 6.9%; ▌ Frederick E. Farmiloe (Prohibition) 3.1%
Illinois 13	Frank O. Lowden	Republican	1906	Incumbent retired. Republican hold.	▌ ✓ John C. McKenzie (Republican) 61.3%; ▌ O. H. Wright (Democratic) 34.7%; ▌ L. B. Markel (Prohibition) 2.4%; ▌ Edward I. Rubendall (Socialist) 1.6%
Illinois 14	James McKinney	Republican	1905	Incumbent re-elected.	▌ ✓ James McKinney (Republican) 52.3%; ▌ Clyde H. Tavenner (Democratic) 40.0%; ▌ Milton L. Morrill (Socialist) 5.1%; ▌ Samuel S. Chapman (Prohibition) 2.6%
Illinois 15	George W. Prince	Republican	1895	Incumbent re-elected.	▌ ✓ George W. Prince (Republican) 47.0%; ▌ Albert E. Bergland (Democratic) 46.3%; ▌ John C. Sjodin (Socialist) 4.2%; ▌ Paul D. Ransom (Prohibition) 2.5%
Illinois 16	Joseph V. Graff	Republican	1894	Incumbent lost re-election. Democratic gain.	▌ ✓ Claude U. Stone (Democratic) 51.2%; ▌ Joseph V. Graff (Republican) 43.6%; ▌ John Panier (Socialist) 3.4%; ▌ Charles C. Edwards (Prohibition) 1.8%
Illinois 17	John A. Sterling	Republican	1902	Incumbent re-elected.	▌ ✓ John A. Sterling (Republican) 52.0%; ▌ Louis FitzHenry (Democratic) 44.5%; ▌ Robert Means (Prohibition) 2.3%; ▌ J. F. Sanders (Socialist) 1.2%
Illinois 18	Joseph Gurney Cannon	Republican	1892	Incumbent re-elected.	▌ ✓ Joseph Gurney Cannon (Republican) 53.0%; ▌ William L. Cundiff (Democratic) 41.0%; ▌ George W. Woollsey (Prohibition) 4.2%; ▌ H. M. Brooks (Socialist) 1.8%
Illinois 19	William B. McKinley	Republican	1904	Incumbent re-elected.	▌ ✓ William B. McKinley (Republican) 52.6%; ▌ I. J. Martin (Democratic) 43.9%; ▌ Thomas C. Eiler (Prohibition) 2.4%; ▌ J. W. Easley (Socialist) 1.1%
Illinois 20	Henry T. Rainey	Democratic	1902	Incumbent re-elected.	▌ ✓ Henry T. Rainey (Democratic) 59.3%; ▌ James H. Danskin (Republican) 38.0%; ▌ Charles Temple (Prohibition) 1.6%; ▌ Jesse Morgan (Socialist) 1.1%
Illinois 21	James M. Graham	Democratic	1908	Incumbent re-elected.	▌ ✓ James M. Graham (Democratic) 50.1%; ▌ H. Clay Wilson (Republican) 43.6%; ▌ Herman Rahm (Socialist) 4.0%; ▌ Edmund Miller (Prohibition) 2.3%
Illinois 22	William A. Rodenberg	Republican	1902	Incumbent re-elected.	▌ ✓ William A. Rodenberg (Republican) 49.7%; ▌ Bruce A. Campbell (Democratic) 40.6%; ▌ Henry Groeteka (Socialist) 8.3%; ▌ A. J. Meek (Prohibition) 1.4%
Illinois 23	Martin D. Foster	Democratic	1906	Incumbent re-elected.	▌ ✓ Martin D. Foster (Democratic) 53.7%; ▌ J. H. Loy (Republican) 41.6%; ▌ D. R. Bebout (Prohibition) 2.5%; ▌ Rikus A. Jeths (Socialist) 2.2%
Illinois 24	Pleasant T. Chapman	Republican	1904	Incumbent lost re-election. Democratic gain.	▌ ✓ H. Robert Fowler (Democratic) 48.8%; ▌ Pleasant T. Chapman (Republican) 47.9%; ▌ T. J. Scott (Prohibition) 1.8%; ▌ M. S. Dickerson (Socialist) 1.5%
Illinois 25	Napoleon B. Thistlewood	Republican	1908	Incumbent re-elected.	▌ ✓ Napoleon B. Thistlewood (Republican) 49.1%; ▌ William D. Lyerly (Democratic) 44.2%; ▌ Daniel Boone (Socialist) 4.9%; ▌ J. H. Davis (Prohibition) 1.8%

== Indiana ==
District	Incumbent			This race	
District	Member	Party	First elected	Results	Candidates
Indiana 1	John W. Boehne	Democratic	1908	Incumbent re-elected.	▌ ✓ John W. Boehne (Democratic) 52.3%; ▌ Francis B. Posey (Republican) 43.4%; ▌ Romelia Bishop (Socialist) 2.3%; ▌ William V. Harrell (Prohibition) 2.0%
Indiana 2	William A. Cullop	Democratic	1908	Incumbent re-elected.	▌ ✓ William A. Cullop (Democratic) 48.4%; ▌ Oscar E. Bland (Republican) 45.2%; ▌ Zimry Garton (Socialist) 4.9%; ▌ Elijah Eddington (Prohibition) 1.5%
Indiana 3	William E. Cox	Democratic	1906	Incumbent re-elected.	▌ ✓ William E. Cox (Democratic) 58.4%; ▌ Harry C. Poindexter (Republican) 40.3%; ▌ William B. Lewis (Prohibition) 1.1%; ▌ A. J. Wells (Socialist) 0.2%
Indiana 4	Lincoln Dixon	Democratic	1904	Incumbent re-elected.	▌ ✓ Lincoln Dixon (Democratic) 53.8%; ▌ John H. Kemman (Republican) 43.8%; ▌ John A. Kinnick (Prohibition) 1.8%; ▌ Reese C. Townsend (Socialist) 0.6%
Indiana 5	Ralph W. Moss	Democratic	1904	Incumbent re-elected.	▌ ✓ Ralph W. Moss (Democratic) 51.6%; ▌ Frank Tilley (Republican) 42.4%; ▌ James O'Neil (Socialist) 4.2%; ▌ Ernest R. Walter (Prohibition) 1.8%
Indiana 6	William O. Barnard	Republican	1908	Incumbent lost re-election. Democratic gain.	▌ ✓ Finly Hutchinson Gray (Democratic) 49.0%; ▌ William O. Barnard (Republican) 45.9%; ▌ Aaron Worth (Prohibition) 3.0%; ▌ William L. Parkins (Socialist) 2.1%
Indiana 7	Charles A. Korbly	Democratic	1908	Incumbent re-elected.	▌ ✓ Charles A. Korbly (Democratic) 50.3%; ▌ Linton A. Cox (Republican) 44.7%; ▌ Carl L. Ott (Socialist) 3.8%; ▌ James A. Lewis (Prohibition) 1.1%
Indiana 8	John A. M. Adair	Democratic	1906	Incumbent re-elected.	▌ ✓ John A. M. Adair (Democratic) 51.8%; ▌ Rollin Warner (Republican) 39.3%; ▌ Orville G. Overcarsh (Socialist) 5.9%; ▌ Carey C. Ayers (Prohibition) 3.0%
Indiana 9	Martin A. Morrison	Democratic	1908	Incumbent re-elected.	▌ ✓ Martin A. Morrison (Democratic) 48.0%; ▌ Everett E. Neal (Republican) 46.8%; ▌ William L. Northam (Socialist) 2.6%; ▌ Robert A. Wasson (Prohibition) 2.6%
Indiana 10	Edgar D. Crumpacker	Republican	1896	Incumbent re-elected.	▌ ✓ Edgar D. Crumpacker (Republican) 50.3%; ▌ John B. Peterson (Democratic) 46.6%; ▌ Ira E. Tilton (Socialist) 1.9%; ▌ Charles H. Tireshing (Prohibition) 1.2%
Indiana 11	George W. Rauch	Democratic	1906	Incumbent re-elected.	▌ ✓ George W. Rauch (Democratic) 47.8%; ▌ John L. Thompson (Republican) 45.2%; ▌ Charles P. Baldwin (Prohibition) 3.9%; ▌ Norvall G. Marlott (Socialist) 3.1%
Indiana 12	Cyrus Cline	Democratic	1908	Incumbent re-elected.	▌ ✓ Cyrus Cline (Democratic) 49.9%; ▌ Owen N. Heaton (Republican) 45.3%; ▌ Beneville Sawyer (Prohibition) 2.7%; ▌ John S. Brunskill (Socialist) 2.1%
Indiana 13	Henry A. Barnhart	Democratic	1908	Incumbent re-elected.	▌ ✓ Henry A. Barnhart (Democratic) 48.2%; ▌ John L. Moorman (Republican) 46.1%; ▌ Isar T. Kohn (Socialist) 3.1%; ▌ Joseph L. Scheueman (Prohibition) 2.6%

== Iowa ==
District	Incumbent			This race	
District	Member	Party	First elected	Results	Candidates
Iowa 1	Charles A. Kennedy	Republican	1906	Incumbent re-elected.	▌ ✓ Charles A. Kennedy (Republican) 51.9%; ▌ J. A. S. Pollard (Democratic) 44.7%; ▌ William Strauss (Socialist) 1.9%; ▌ E.J. Starr (Prohibition) 1.6%
Iowa 2	Albert F. Dawson	Republican	1904	Incumbent retired. Democratic gain.	▌ ✓ Irvin S. Pepper (Democratic) 51.5%; ▌ Charles Grilk (Republican) 41.1%; ▌ J. C. Cook (Socialist) 3.9%; ▌ John Bernet (Prohibition) 0.6%
Iowa 3	Charles E. Pickett	Republican	1908	Incumbent re-elected.	▌ ✓ Charles E. Pickett (Republican) 54.3%; ▌ John D. Denison Jr. (Democratic) 43.7%; ▌ Luther M. Hawer (Socialist) 2.0%
Iowa 4	Gilbert N. Haugen	Republican	1898	Incumbent re-elected.	▌ ✓ Gilbert N. Haugen (Republican) 49.9%; ▌ Daniel D. Murphy (Democratic) 49.3%; ▌ F. E. Macha (Socialist) 2.0%
Iowa 5	James W. Good	Republican	1908	Incumbent re-elected.	▌ ✓ James W. Good (Republican) 51.8%; ▌ S. C. Huber (Democratic) 44.8%; ▌ W. B. Goulding (Socialist) 1.7%; ▌ Frank Swearinger (Prohibition) 1.7%
Iowa 6	Nathan E. Kendall	Republican	1908	Incumbent re-elected.	▌ ✓ Nathan E. Kendall (Republican) 48.2%; ▌ Daniel W. Hamilton (Democratic) 47.0%; ▌ Walter C. Minnick (Socialist) 3.1%; ▌ F.M. Barrett (Prohibition) 1.7%
Iowa 7	John A. T. Hull	Republican	1890	Incumbent lost renomination. Republican hold.	▌ ✓ Solomon F. Prouty (Republican) 53.1%; ▌ Clint L. Price (Democratic) 43.5%; ▌ Alexander Wilson (Socialist) 3.4%
Iowa 8	William Darius Jamieson	Democratic	1908	Incumbent retired. Republican gain.	▌ ✓ Horace M. Towner (Republican) 54.9%; ▌ Frank Q. Stuart (Democratic) 43.7%; ▌ S. D. Mercer (Socialist) 1.4%
Iowa 9	Walter I. Smith	Republican	1900	Incumbent re-elected.	▌ ✓ Walter I. Smith (Republican) 52.0%; ▌ William Fiske Cleveland (Democratic) 46.9%; ▌ Alden O. Mudge (Socialist) 1.1%
Iowa 10	Frank P. Woods	Republican	1908	Incumbent re-elected.	▌ ✓ Frank P. Woods (Republican) 97.0%; ▌ Albert R. Anderson (Socialist) 3.0%
Iowa 11	Elbert H. Hubbard	Republican	1904	Incumbent re-elected.	▌ ✓ Elbert H. Hubbard (Republican) 59.9%; ▌ M. M. White (Democratic) 38.8%; ▌ Jim Smith (Socialist) 1.3%

== Kansas ==
District	Incumbent			This race	
District	Member	Party	First elected	Results	Candidates
Kansas 1	Daniel R. Anthony Jr.	Republican	1907 (special)	Incumbent re-elected.	▌ ✓ Daniel R. Anthony Jr. (Republican) 72.3%; ▌J. B. Chapman (Democratic) 24.8%; ▌E. B. Keck (Socialist) 2.9%
Kansas 2	Charles F. Scott	Republican	1900	Incumbent lost renomination. Republican hold.	▌ ✓ Alexander C. Mitchell (Republican) 50.9%; ▌John Caldwell (Democratic) 43.4%; ▌ Kate Richards O'Hare (Socialist) 5.0%; ▌ C. H. Smith (Prohibition) 0.7%
Kansas 3	Philip P. Campbell	Republican	1902	Incumbent re-elected.	▌ ✓ Philip P. Campbell (Republican) 44.5%; ▌Jeremiah D. Botkin (Democratic) 42.7%; ▌C. S. Bendure (Socialist) 12.3%; ▌W. P. Talbot (Prohibition) 0.5%
Kansas 4	James Monroe Miller	Republican	1898	Incumbent lost renomination. Republican hold.	▌ ✓ Fred S. Jackson (Republican) 54.9%; ▌Henderson S. Martin (Democratic) 45.1%
Kansas 5	William A. Calderhead	Republican	1894; 1896 (lost); 1898	Incumbent lost renomination. Republican hold.	▌ ✓ Rollin R. Rees (Republican) 51.3%; ▌Guy T. Helvering (Democratic) 45.8%; ▌W. C. Johnson (Socialist) 3.0%
Kansas 6	William A. Reeder	Republican	1898	Incumbent lost renomination. Republican hold.	▌ ✓ Isaac D. Young (Republican) 50.9%; ▌Frank Rockefeller (Democratic) 46.0%; ▌D. W. Stoner (Socialist) 3.1%
Kansas 7	Edmond H. Madison	Republican	1906	Incumbent re-elected.	▌ ✓ Edmond H. Madison (Republican) 53.1%; ▌George A. Neeley (Democratic) 42.9%; ▌E. H. H. Gates (Socialist) 4.0%
Kansas 8	Victor Murdock	Republican	1903	Incumbent re-elected.	▌ ✓ Victor Murdock (Republican) 87.3%; ▌George Burnett (Socialist) 12.7%

== Kentucky ==
District	Incumbent			This race	
District	Member	Party	First elected	Results	Candidates
Kentucky 1	Ollie Murray James	Democratic	1902	Incumbent re-elected.	▌ ✓ Ollie Murray James (Democratic) 89.3%; ▌ C. L. Harney (Socialist) 10.7%
Kentucky 2	Augustus Owsley Stanley	Democratic	1902	Incumbent re-elected.	▌ ✓ Augustus Owsley Stanley (Democratic) 62.2%; ▌ R. J. Salmon (Republican) 35.7%; ▌ Nicholas Royster (Socialist) 2.1%
Kentucky 3	Robert Y. Thomas Jr.	Democratic	1908	Incumbent re-elected.	▌ ✓ Robert Y. Thomas Jr. (Democratic) 51.3%; ▌ W. H. Jones (Republican) 47.5%; ▌ W. L. Cassady (Prohibition) 1.2%
Kentucky 4	Ben Johnson	Democratic	1906	Incumbent re-elected.	▌ ✓ Ben Johnson (Democratic) 59.2%; ▌ D. W. Gaddie (Republican) 38.8%; ▌ E. G. Austin (Socialist) 2.0%
Kentucky 5	J. Swagar Sherley	Democratic	1902	Incumbent re-elected.	▌ ✓ J. Swagar Sherley (Democratic) 53.2%; ▌ J. Wheeler McGee (Republican) 43.1%; ▌ George W. Young (Socialist) 2.7%; ▌ J.B. Stroud (Prohibition) 0.6%; ▌ [FNU] Arnold (Socialist Labor) 0.5%
Kentucky 6	Joseph L. Rhinock	Democratic	1904	Incumbent retired. Democratic hold.	▌ ✓ Arthur B. Rouse (Democratic) 55.6%; ▌ Charles W. Nagel (Republican) 39.6%; ▌ Walter Lauferseik (Socialist) 4.8%
Kentucky 7	J. Campbell Cantrill	Democratic	1908	Incumbent re-elected.	▌ ✓ J. Campbell Cantrill (Democratic) 56.0%; ▌ M. C. Rankin (Republican) 44.0%
Kentucky 8	Harvey Helm	Democratic	1906	Incumbent re-elected.	▌ ✓ Harvey Helm (Democratic) 56.9%; ▌ Hugh Miller (Republican) 43.1%
Kentucky 9	Joseph B. Bennett	Republican	1904	Incumbent lost re-election. Democratic gain.	▌ ✓ William J. Fields (Democratic) 50.8%; ▌ Joseph B. Bennett (Republican) 49.2%
Kentucky 10	John W. Langley	Republican	1906	Incumbent re-elected.	▌ ✓ John W. Langley (Republican) 52.4%; ▌ A. Floyd Byrd (Democratic) 47.6%
Kentucky 11	Don C. Edwards	Republican	1904	Incumbent lost renomination. Republican hold.	▌ ✓ Caleb Powers (Republican) 60.5%; ▌ Elza Bertrand (Democratic) 38.6%; ▌ S. Brents (Socialist) 0.9%

== Louisiana ==
District	Incumbent			This race	
District	Member	Party	First elected	Results	Candidates
Louisiana 1	Albert Estopinal	Democratic	1908	Incumbent re-elected.	▌ ✓ Albert Estopinal (Democratic) 89.5%; ▌ John A. Wogan (Republican) 10.6%
Louisiana 2	Samuel L. Gilmore	Democratic	1909	Incumbent died. Member also elected to finish term. Democratic hold.	▌ ✓ H. Garland Dupré (Democratic) 83.2%; ▌ Victor Loisel (Republican) 16.9%
Louisiana 3	Robert F. Broussard	Democratic	1896	Incumbent re-elected.	▌ ✓ Robert F. Broussard (Democratic) 91.0%; ▌ Jules Dreyfus (Republican) 9.0%
Louisiana 4	John T. Watkins	Democratic	1904	Incumbent re-elected.	▌ ✓ John T. Watkins (Democratic) 95.9%; ▌ L. M. Grigsby (Independent) 4.1%
Louisiana 5	Joseph E. Ransdell	Democratic	1899	Incumbent re-elected.	▌ ✓ Joseph E. Ransdell (Democratic) 99.0%
Louisiana 6	Robert Charles Wickliffe	Democratic	1908	Incumbent re-elected.	▌ ✓ Robert Charles Wickliffe (Democratic) 100%
Louisiana 7	Arsène Pujo	Democratic	1902	Incumbent re-elected.	▌ ✓ Arsène Pujo (Democratic) 91.3%; ▌ J. R. Jones (Socialist) 8.7%

== Maine ==
District	Incumbent			This race	
District	Member	Party	First elected	Results	Candidates
Maine 1	Amos L. Allen	Republican	1899	Incumbent retired but died before next term. Republican hold.	▌ ✓ Asher Hinds (Republican) 49.8%; ▌W. M. Pennell (Democratic) 48.0%; ▌James Perrigo (Prohibition) 1.2%; ▌Percy F. Morse (Socialist) 0.9%
Maine 2	John P. Swasey	Republican	1908	Incumbent lost re-election. Democratic gain.	▌ ✓ Daniel J. McGillicuddy (Democratic) 52.6%; ▌ John P. Swasey (Republican) 45.1%; ▌W. R. Pickering (Socialist) 1.4%; ▌Charles. E. Emerson (Prohibition) 0.9%
Maine 3	Edwin C. Burleigh	Republican	1897	Incumbent lost re-election. Democratic gain.	▌ ✓ Samuel Wadsworth Gould (Democratic) 51.1%; ▌ Edwin C. Burleigh (Republican) 46.9%; ▌S. S. Brown (Socialist) 1.3%; ▌William I. Sterling (Prohibition) 0.7%
Maine 4	Frank E. Guernsey	Republican	1908	Incumbent re-elected.	▌ ✓ Frank E. Guernsey (Republican) 50.3%; ▌ George M. Hanson (Democratic) 48.9%; ▌William A. Rideout (Prohibition) 0.9%

== Maryland ==
District	Incumbent			This race	
District	Member	Party	First elected	Results	Candidates
Maryland 1	James Harry Covington	Democratic	1908	Incumbent re-elected.	▌ ✓ J. Harry Covington (Democratic) 51.6%; ▌Abraham Lincoln Dryden (Republican) 45.2%; ▌Charles M. Elderdice (Prohibition) 3.1%
Maryland 2	J. Frederick C. Talbott	Democratic	1902	Incumbent re-elected.	▌ ✓ J. Frederick C. Talbott (Democratic) 51.8%; ▌William Benjamin Baker (Republican) 46.1%; ▌Harry E. Gilbert (Prohibition) 1.3%; ▌Charles W. Smiley (Socialist) 1.1%
Maryland 3	John Kronmiller	Republican	1908	Incumbent retired. Democratic gain.	▌ ✓ George Konig (Democratic) 48.4%; ▌Charles W. Main (Republican) 47.4%; ▌Robert J. Fields (Socialist) 3.2%; ▌Conrad Mauler Jr. (Prohibition) 1.0%
Maryland 4	John Gill Jr.	Democratic	1904	Incumbent retired. Democratic hold.	▌ ✓ J. Charles Linthicum (Democratic) 50.8%; ▌Addison E. Mullikin (Republican) 45.7%; ▌Charles F. Klein (Socialist) 2.2%; ▌Stephen L. LeCompte (Prohibition) 1.3%
Maryland 5	Sydney E. Mudd I	Republican	1888; 1890 (lost); 1896	Incumbent retired. Republican hold.	▌ ✓ Thomas Parran (Republican) 49.2%; ▌J. Enos Ray Jr. (Democratic) 46.9%; ▌August Hartig (Socialist) 1.9%; ▌Samuel R. Neave (Prohibition) 1.6%
Maryland 6	George A. Pearre	Republican	1898	Incumbent retired. Democratic gain.	▌ ✓ David John Lewis (Democratic) 48.1%; ▌Brainard Henry Warner Jr. (Republican) 46.1%; ▌Paul O. Weber (Socialist) 3.4%; ▌Finley C. Hendrickson (Prohibition) 2.5%

== Massachusetts ==
District	Incumbent			This race	
District	Member	Party	First elected	Results	Candidates
Massachusetts 1	George P. Lawrence	Republican	1897 (special)	Incumbent re-elected.	▌ ✓ George P. Lawrence (Republican) 48.9%; ▌Edward M. Lewis (Democratic) 45.9%; ▌Louis B. Clark (Socialist) 5.1%
Massachusetts 2	Frederick H. Gillett	Republican	1892	Incumbent re-elected.	▌ ✓ Frederick H. Gillett (Republican) 48.8%; ▌William G. McKechnie (Democratic) 47.2%; ▌Alva E. Fenton (Socialist) 4.0%
Massachusetts 3	Charles G. Washburn	Republican	1906 (special)	Incumbent lost re-election. Democratic gain.	▌ ✓ John A. Thayer (Democratic) 51.2%; ▌Charles G. Washburn (Republican) 48.8%
Massachusetts 4	Vacant			Incumbent died July 31, 1910. Republican hold.	▌ ✓ William Wilder (Republican) 49.1%; ▌John Joseph Mitchell (Democratic) 48.7%; ▌James D. Ryan (Socialist) 2.2%
Massachusetts 5	Butler Ames	Republican	1902	Incumbent re-elected.	▌ ✓ Butler Ames (Republican) 51.1%; ▌James H. Carmichael (Democratic) 48.9%
Massachusetts 6	Augustus P. Gardner	Republican	1902 (special)	Incumbent re-elected.	▌ ✓ Augustus P. Gardner (Republican) 54.0%; ▌William H. O'Brien (Democratic) 37.6%; ▌James F. Carey (Socialist) 8.3%
Massachusetts 7	Ernest W. Roberts	Republican	1898	Incumbent re-elected.	▌ ✓ Ernest W. Roberts (Republican) 50.7%; ▌Walter H. Creamer (Democratic) 43.7%; ▌W. Lathrop Meaker (People's) 5.6%
Massachusetts 8	Samuel W. McCall	Republican	1892	Incumbent re-elected.	▌ ✓ Samuel W. McCall (Republican) 53.4%; ▌Frederick Simpson Deitrick (Democratic) 46.6%
Massachusetts 9	John A. Keliher	Democratic	1902	Incumbent lost re-nomination. Democratic hold.	▌ ✓ William F. Murray (Democratic) 49.0%; ▌John A. Keliher (Ind. Democratic) 42.2%; ▌William H. Oakes (Republican) 8.7%
Massachusetts 10	Joseph F. O'Connell	Democratic	1906	Incumbent lost re-nomination. Democratic hold.	▌ ✓ James Michael Curley (Democratic) 56.3%; ▌J. Mitchel Galvin (Republican) 43.7%
Massachusetts 11	Andrew J. Peters	Democratic	1906	Incumbent re-elected.	▌ ✓ Andrew J. Peters (Democratic) 59.2%; ▌William Dudley Cotton Jr. (Republican) 40.8%
Massachusetts 12	John W. Weeks	Republican	1904	Incumbent re-elected.	▌ ✓ John W. Weeks (Republican) 56.4%; ▌Daniel J. Daley (Democratic) 43.6%
Massachusetts 13	William S. Greene	Republican	1898 (special)	Incumbent re-elected.	▌ ✓ William S. Greene (Republican) 58.9%; ▌James F. Morris (Democratic) 41.1%
Massachusetts 14	Eugene Foss	Democratic	1910 (special)	Incumbent retired to run for Governor of Massachusetts. Republican gain.	▌ ✓ Robert O. Harris (Republican) 47.9%; ▌Thomas Chandler Thacher (Democratic) 47.6%; ▌John McCarty (Socialist) 4.5%

== Michigan ==
District	Incumbent			This race	
District	Member	Party	First elected	Results	Candidates
Michigan 1	Edwin Denby	Republican	1904	Incumbent lost re-election. Democratic gain.	▌ ✓ Frank E. Doremus (Democratic) 52.0%; ▌ Edwin Denby (Republican) 44.1%; ▌ Charles Erb (Socialist) 3.2%; ▌ Alfred Lowther (Prohibition) 0.8%
Michigan 2	Charles E. Townsend	Republican	1902	Incumbent retired to run for US Senator. Republican hold.	▌ ✓ William Wedemeyer (Republican) 57.0%; ▌ John V. Sheehan (Democratic) 40.1%; ▌ Edward P. Bates (Prohibition) 1.9%; ▌ David J. Malloy (Socialist) 1.0%
Michigan 3	Washington Gardner	Republican	1898	Incumbent lost renomination. Republican hold.	▌ ✓ John M. C. Smith (Republican) 57.7%; ▌ Nathaniel H. Stewart (Democratic) 37.0%; ▌ Charles H. Price (Socialist) 2.7%; ▌ Frederick S. Goodrich (Prohibition) 2.6%
Michigan 4	Edward L. Hamilton	Republican	1896	Incumbent re-elected.	▌ ✓ Edward L. Hamilton (Republican) 57.7%; ▌ John E. Barnes (Democratic) 39.6%; ▌ Henry Andrews (Prohibition) 2.1%; ▌ Otis M. Southworth (Socialist) 2.1%
Michigan 5	Gerrit J. Diekema	Republican	1907	Incumbent lost re-election. Democratic gain.	▌ ✓ Edwin F. Sweet (Democratic) 48.4%; ▌ Gerrit J. Diekema (Republican) 46.4%; ▌ Henry W. Powell (Prohibition) 2.8%; ▌ B. F. Barendsen (Socialist) 2.4%
Michigan 6	Samuel W. Smith	Republican	1896	Incumbent re-elected.	▌ ✓ Samuel W. Smith (Republican) 52.9%; ▌ Alva M. Cummins (Democratic) 41.7%; ▌ W. S. Sly (Prohibition) 2.7%; ▌ John A. C. Menton (Socialist) 2.7%
Michigan 7	Henry McMorran	Republican	1902	Incumbent re-elected.	▌ ✓ Henry McMorran (Republican) 55.6%; ▌ Thomas Wellman (Democratic) 40.5%; ▌ Nelson Miller (Prohibition) 2.4%; ▌ [FNU] Smith (Socialist) 1.5%
Michigan 8	Joseph W. Fordney	Republican	1898	Incumbent re-elected.	▌ ✓ Joseph W. Fordney (Republican) 56.5%; ▌ James P. Devereaux (Democratic) 40.2%; ▌ J. George Fisher (Prohibition) 2.1%; ▌ Frank E. Jones (Socialist) 1.2%
Michigan 9	James C. McLaughlin	Republican	1906	Incumbent re-elected.	▌ ✓ James C. McLaughlin (Republican) 65.7%; ▌ Emery D. Weimer (Democratic) 31.1%; ▌ R. C. Young (Prohibition) 3.2%
Michigan 10	George A. Loud	Republican	1902	Incumbent re-elected.	▌ ✓ George A. Loud (Republican) 59.8%; ▌ Albert Miller (Democratic) 34.7%; ▌ Henry A. Hotchkiss (Socialist) 3.8%; ▌ George A. Parmenter (Prohibition) 1.8%
Michigan 11	Francis H. Dodds	Republican	1908	Incumbent re-elected.	▌ ✓ Francis H. Dodds (Republican) 64.8%; ▌ Hubbard Head (Democratic) 28.7%; ▌ Raymond Bentley (Socialist) 3.9%; ▌ Lewis Welch (Prohibition) 2.6%
Michigan 12	H. Olin Young	Republican	1902	Incumbent re-elected.	▌ ✓ H. Olin Young (Republican) 73.6%; ▌ Gideon T. Werline (Democratic) 26.1%

== Minnesota ==
District	Incumbent			This race	
District	Member	Party	First elected	Results	Candidates
Minnesota 1	James A. Tawney	Republican	1892	Incumbent lost renomination. Republican hold.	▌ ✓ Sydney Anderson (Republican) 55.3%; ▌H. L. Buck (Democratic) 44.7%
Minnesota 2	Winfield Scott Hammond	Democratic	1906	Incumbent re-elected.	▌ ✓ Winfield Scott Hammond (Democratic) 53.2%; ▌Franklin Ellsworth (Republican) 44.8%; ▌Dexter A. Thayer (Public Ownership) 2.0%
Minnesota 3	Charles Russell Davis	Republican	1894	Incumbent re-elected.	▌ ✓ Charles Russell Davis (Republican) 100%
Minnesota 4	Frederick Stevens	Republican	1896	Incumbent re-elected.	▌ ✓ Frederick Stevens (Republican) 56.6%; ▌John L. Gieske (Democratic) 37.5%; ▌Charles Stratton (Public Ownership) 5.9%
Minnesota 5	Frank Nye	Republican	1906	Incumbent re-elected.	▌ ✓ Frank Nye (Republican) 50.0%; ▌Thomas P. Dwyer (Democratic) 43.3%; ▌Frederick F. Lindsay (Public Ownership) 6.7%
Minnesota 6	Charles August Lindbergh	Republican	1906	Incumbent re-elected.	▌ ✓ Charles August Lindbergh (Republican) 100%
Minnesota 7	Andrew Volstead	Republican	1902	Incumbent re-elected.	▌ ✓ Andrew Volstead (Republican) 100%
Minnesota 8	Clarence B. Miller	Republican	1908	Incumbent re-elected.	▌ ✓ Clarence B. Miller (Republican) 53.7%; ▌Alfred Jaques (Democratic) 32.5%; ▌Olin S. Watkins (Public Ownership) 13.7%
Minnesota 9	Halvor Steenerson	Republican	1902	Incumbent re-elected.	▌ ✓ Halvor Steenerson (Republican) 74.5%; ▌David Sanders (Public Ownership) 25.5%

== Mississippi ==
District	Incumbent			This race	
District	Member	Party	First elected	Results	Candidates
Mississippi 1	Ezekiel S. Candler Jr.	Democratic	1900	Incumbent re-elected.	▌ ✓ Ezekiel S. Candler Jr. (Democratic) 100%
Mississippi 2	Thomas Spight	Democratic	1898 (special)	Incumbent lost renomination. Democratic hold.	▌ ✓ Hubert D. Stephens (Democratic) 100%
Mississippi 3	Benjamin G. Humphreys II	Democratic	1902	Incumbent re-elected.	▌ ✓ Benjamin G. Humphreys II (Democratic) 100%
Mississippi 4	Thomas U. Sisson	Democratic	1908	Incumbent re-elected.	▌ ✓ Thomas U. Sisson (Democratic) 100%
Mississippi 5	Adam M. Byrd	Democratic	1902	Incumbent lost renomination. Democratic hold.	▌ ✓ Samuel A. Witherspoon (Democratic) 100%
Mississippi 6	Eaton J. Bowers	Democratic	1902	Incumbent retired. Democratic hold.	▌ ✓ Pat Harrison (Democratic) 99.43%; ▌Charles F. Myers (Socialist) 0.57%
Mississippi 7	William A. Dickson	Democratic	1908	Incumbent re-elected.	▌ ✓ William A. Dickson (Democratic) 100%
Mississippi 8	James Collier	Democratic	1908	Incumbent re-elected.	▌ ✓ James Collier (Democratic) 100%

== Missouri ==
District	Incumbent			This race	
District	Member	Party	First elected	Results	Candidates
Missouri 1	James T. Lloyd	Democratic	1897	Incumbent re-elected.	▌ ✓ James T. Lloyd (Democratic) 54.1%; ▌ Walter A. Higbee (Republican) 42.3%; ▌ [FNU] Pico (Socialist) 1.8%; ▌ Roy O. Youtz (Prohibition) 1.8%
Missouri 2	William W. Rucker	Democratic	1898	Incumbent re-elected.	▌ ✓ William W. Rucker (Democratic) 55.6%; ▌ Edward F. Haley (Republican) 42.5%; ▌ C. F. Tobey (Prohibition) 1.2%; ▌ [FNU] Campbell (Socialist) 0.7%
Missouri 3	Joshua W. Alexander	Democratic	1906	Incumbent re-elected.	▌ ✓ Joshua W. Alexander (Democratic) 56.3%; ▌ Samuel P. Davisson (Republican) 43.7%
Missouri 4	Charles F. Booher	Democratic	1906	Incumbent re-elected.	▌ ✓ Charles F. Booher (Democratic) 55.1%; ▌ W. K. Amick (Republican) 43.1%; ▌ [FNU] Wilcox (Socialist) 0.9%; ▌ A. B. Wray (Prohibition) 0.9%
Missouri 5	William P. Borland	Democratic	1908	Incumbent re-elected.	▌ ✓ William P. Borland (Democratic) 54.6%; ▌ Howard F. Lea (Republican) 42.2%; ▌ [FNU] Weber (Socialist) 1.8%; ▌ Charles E. Stokes (Prohibition) 1.4%
Missouri 6	Clement C. Dickinson	Democratic	1910	Incumbent re-elected.	▌ ✓ Clement C. Dickinson (Democratic) 53.2%; ▌ Francis H. De Vol (Republican) 43.7%; ▌ [FNU] Ward (Socialist) 1.6%; ▌ William M. Godwin (Prohibition) 1.5%
Missouri 7	Courtney W. Hamlin	Democratic	1906	Incumbent re-elected.	▌ ✓ Courtney W. Hamlin (Democratic) 49.1%; ▌ Holmes Hall (Republican) 48.0%; ▌ [FNU] Fox (Socialist) 2.1%; ▌ Irvin T. Hull (Prohibition) 0.8%
Missouri 8	Dorsey W. Shackleford	Democratic	1899	Incumbent re-elected.	▌ ✓ Dorsey W. Shackleford (Democratic) 53.3%; ▌ Robert A. Norfleet (Republican) 45.9%; ▌ [FNU] Ballinger (Socialist) 0.8%
Missouri 9	Champ Clark	Democratic	1896	Incumbent re-elected.	▌ ✓ Champ Clark (Democratic) 54.5%; ▌ Reuben F. Roy (Republican) 45.0%; ▌ James P. Rodgers (Prohibition) 0.5%
Missouri 10	Richard Bartholdt	Republican	1892	Incumbent re-elected.	▌ ✓ Richard Bartholdt (Republican) 60.8%; ▌ Charles J. Maurer (Democratic) 32.0%; ▌ G. A. Hoehn (Socialist) 6.7%; ▌ John H. Flower (Prohibition) 0.5%
Missouri 11	Patrick F. Gill	Democratic	1908	Incumbent lost re-election. Republican gain.	▌ ✓ Theron E. Catlin (Republican) 49.7%; ▌ Patrick F. Gill (Democratic) 46.3%; ▌ [FNU] Stopp (Socialist) 4.0%
Missouri 11	Patrick F. Gill	Democratic	1908	Election successfully contested. New member seated August 12, 1912. Democratic hold.	▌ ✓ Patrick F. Gill (Democratic); ▌ ✓ Theron E. Catlin (Republican); ▌ [FNU] Stopp (Socialist)
Missouri 12	Harry M. Coudrey	Republican	1904	Incumbent retired. Republican hold.	▌ ✓ Leonidas C. Dyer (Republican) 53.1%; ▌ Thomas Kinney (Democratic) 43.7%; ▌ [FNU] Rocker (Socialist) 3.2%
Missouri 13	Politte Elvins	Republican	1908	Incumbent lost re-election. Democratic gain.	▌ ✓ Walter Lewis Hensley (Democratic) 49.3%; ▌ Politte Elvins (Republican) 47.4%; ▌ [FNU] Odam (Socialist) 3.3%
Missouri 14	Charles A. Crow	Republican	1908	Incumbent lost re-election. Democratic gain.	▌ ✓ Joseph J. Russell (Democratic) 47.8%; ▌ Charles A. Crow (Republican) 45.5%; ▌ Philip A. Hafner (Socialist) 6.0%; ▌ Elijah Osborn (Prohibition) 0.7%
Missouri 15	Charles H. Morgan	Republican	1908	Incumbent lost re-election. Democratic gain.	▌ ✓ James A. Daugherty (Democratic) 47.4%; ▌ Charles H. Morgan (Republican) 45.5%; ▌ [FNU] Berry (Socialist) 4.9%; ▌ W. H. Dalton (Prohibition) 2.2%
Missouri 16	Arthur P. Murphy	Republican	1908	Incumbent lost re-election. Democratic gain.	▌ ✓ Thomas L. Rubey (Democratic) 52.1%; ▌ Arthur P. Murphy (Republican) 47.4%; ▌ F. W. Search (Prohibition) 0.5%

== Montana ==
District	Incumbent			This race	
District	Member	Party	First elected	Results	Candidates
Montana at-large	Charles N. Pray	Republican	1906	Incumbent re-elected.	▌ ✓ Charles N. Pray (Republican) 49.44%; ▌Charles S. Hartman (Democratic) 42.68%; ▌J. Frank Mabie (Socialist) 7.88%

== Nebraska ==
District	Incumbent			This race	
District	Member	Party	First elected	Results	Candidates
Nebraska 1	John A. Maguire	Democratic	1908	Incumbent re-elected.	▌ ✓ John A. Maguire (Democratic) 50.40%; ▌William Hayward (Republican) 48.15%; ▌C. R. Oyler (Socialist) 1.45%
Nebraska 2	Gilbert Hitchcock	Democratic	1906	Incumbent retired to run for U.S. senator. Democratic hold.	▌ ✓ Charles O. Lobeck (Democratic) 48.86%; ▌Abraham L. Sutton (Republican) 48.13%; ▌Peter Mehrens (Socialist) 3.02%
Nebraska 3	James P. Latta	Democratic	1908	Incumbent re-elected.	▌ ✓ James P. Latta (Democratic) 57.65%; ▌John F. Boyd (Republican) 41.26%; ▌Henry F. Hockenberger (Prohibition) 1.09%
Nebraska 4	Edmund H. Hinshaw	Republican	1902	Incumbent retired. Republican hold.	▌ ✓ Charles H. Sloan (Republican) 50.84%; ▌Benjamin F. Good (Democratic) 47.75%; ▌A. H. Martin (Socialist) 1.41%
Nebraska 5	George W. Norris	Republican	1902	Incumbent re-elected.	▌ ✓ George W. Norris (Republican) 53.69%; ▌Roderick D. Sutherland (Democratic) 42.90%; ▌S. M. Elliott (Socialist) 2.20%; ▌John D. Stoddard (Prohibition) 1.22%
Nebraska 6	Moses Kinkaid	Republican	1902	Incumbent re-elected.	▌ ✓ Moses Kinkaid (Republican) 52.75%; ▌William J. Taylor (Democratic) 42.68%; ▌Fred G. Chase (Socialist) 3.23%; ▌Robert G. Ross (Prohibition) 1.34%

== Nevada ==
District	Incumbent			This race	
District	Member	Party	First elected	Results	Candidates
Nevada at-large	George A. Bartlett	Democratic	1906	Incumbent retired. Republican gain.	▌ ✓ Edwin E. Roberts (Republican) 49.9%; ▌ Charles S. Sprague (Democratic) 38.1%; ▌ Ashley Grant Miller (Socialist) 12.0%

== New Hampshire ==
District	Incumbent			This race	
District	Member	Party	First elected	Results	Candidates
New Hampshire 1	Cyrus A. Sulloway	Republican	1894	Incumbent re-elected.	▌ ✓ Cyrus A. Sulloway (Republican) 50.5%; ▌ Eugene E. Reed (Democratic) 48.5%; ▌ Albert J. Marden (Socialist) 1.0%
New Hampshire 2	Frank D. Currier	Republican	1900	Incumbent re-elected.	▌ ✓ Frank D. Currier (Republican) 55.1%; ▌ Henry Harrison Metcalf (Democratic) 43.0%; ▌ William H. Wilkins (Socialist) 1.4%; ▌ Roger E. Thompson (Prohibition) 0.5%

== New Jersey ==
District	Incumbent			This race	
District	Member	Party	First elected	Results	Candidates
New Jersey 1	Henry C. Loudenslager	Republican	1892	Incumbent re-elected.	▌ ✓ Henry C. Loudenslager (Republican) 48.6%; ▌ Joseph E. Nowrey (Democratic) 46.7%; ▌ Leo M. Harkins (Socialist) 2.9%; ▌ Charles C. Dempsey (Prohibition) 1.8%
New Jersey 2	John J. Gardner	Republican	1892	Incumbent re-elected.	▌ ✓ John J. Gardner (Republican) 51.6%; ▌ George Hampton (Democratic) 38.2%; ▌ William Riddle (Independent Labor) 7.9%; ▌ John W. Hughes (Prohibition) 1.7%; ▌ George S. Radcliffe (Socialist) 0.7%
New Jersey 3	Benjamin F. Howell	Republican	1894	Incumbent lost re-election. Democratic gain.	▌ ✓ Thomas J. Scully (Democratic) 54.8%; ▌ Benjamin F. Howell (Republican) 44.8%; ▌ Jacob H. Hoagland (Prohibition) 0.4%
New Jersey 4	Ira W. Wood	Republican	1904	Incumbent re-elected.	▌ ✓ Ira W. Wood (Republican) 49.1%; ▌ William Libbey (Democratic) 48.4%; ▌ [FNU] Pette (Socialist) 1.6%; ▌ William Lunger (Prohibition) 0.9%
New Jersey 5	Charles N. Fowler	Republican	1894	Incumbent retired to run for U.S. senator. Democratic gain.	▌ ✓ William E. Tuttle Jr. (Democratic) 51.0%; ▌ William Nelson Runyon (Republican) 44.4%; ▌ William Amarian Matthews (Socialist) 3.3%; ▌ Charles H. Hedges (Prohibition) 0.9%; ▌ [FNU] Reese (Socialist Labor) 0.4%
New Jersey 6	William Hughes	Democratic	1906	Incumbent re-elected.	▌ ✓ William Hughes (Democratic) 51.6%; ▌Stephen Wood McClave (Republican) 44.3%; ▌ Frank Hubschmitt (Socialist) 2.8%; ▌ [FNU] Berdan (Socialist Labor) 0.7%; ▌ Mahlon D. Reed (Prohibition) 0.6%
New Jersey 7	Richard W. Parker	Republican	1894	Incumbent lost re-election. Democratic gain.	▌ ✓ Edward W. Townsend (Democratic) 54.0%; ▌ Richard W. Parker (Republican) 43.7%; ▌ Edward H. Ashton (Socialist) 2.1%; ▌ Theodore N. Logan (Prohibition) 0.2%
New Jersey 8	William H. Wiley	Republican	1908	Incumbent lost re-election. Democratic gain.	▌ ✓ Walter I. McCoy (Democratic) 51.2%; ▌ William H. Wiley (Republican) 44.6%; ▌ [FNU] Stokes (Socialist) 3.9%; ▌ Charles S. Stokes (Prohibition) 0.3%
New Jersey 9	Eugene F. Kinkead	Democratic	1908	Incumbent re-elected.	▌ ✓ Eugene F. Kinkead (Democratic) 62.3%; ▌ George Lawrence Record (Republican) 35.1%; ▌ [FNU] Paine (Socialist) 2.6%
New Jersey 10	James A. Hamill	Democratic	1906	Incumbent re-elected.	▌ ✓ James A. Hamill (Democratic) 70.2%; ▌ Rutherford B. Seibel (Republican) 27.0%; ▌ Charles Ufert (Socialist) 2.8%

== New York ==
District	Incumbent			This race	
District	Member	Party	First elected	Results	Candidates
New York 1	William W. Cocks	Republican	1904	Incumbent lost re-election. Democratic gain.	▌ ✓ Martin W. Littleton (Democratic/Ind. League) 54.0%; ▌ William W. Cocks (Republican) 43.7%; ▌ Timothy Walsh (Socialist) 1.9%; ▌ Orville H. Northrop (Prohibition) 0.4%
New York 2	George H. Lindsay	Democratic	1900	Incumbent re-elected.	▌ ✓ George H. Lindsay (Democratic) 59.2%; ▌ Ladislaus W. Schwenck (Republican/Ind. League) 34.5%; ▌ Paul Muller (Socialist) 5.9%; ▌ James B. Davie (Prohibition) 0.4%
New York 3	Otto G. Foelker	Republican	1908	Incumbent retired. Democratic gain.	▌ ✓ James P. Maher (Democratic) 48.3%; ▌ Alfred T. Hobley (Republican/Ind. League) 45.6%; ▌ John J. Jennings (Socialist) 5.7%; ▌ Hollis H. Terry (Prohibition) 0.4%
New York 4	Charles B. Law	Republican	1904	Incumbent lost re-election. Democratic gain.	▌ ✓ Frank E. Wilson (Democratic/Ind. League) 46.6%; ▌ Charles B. Law (Republican) 45.8%; ▌ Barnet Wolff (Socialist) 7.4%; ▌ George H. Warwick (Prohibition) 0.2%
New York 5	Richard Young	Republican	1908	Incumbent retired. Democratic gain.	▌ ✓ William C. Redfield (Democratic/Ind. League) 51.7%; ▌ Warren I. Lee (Republican) 44.5%; ▌ Bernard J. Riley (Socialist) 3.4%; ▌ William C. Milliken (Prohibition) 0.4%
New York 6	William M. Calder	Republican	1904	Incumbent re-elected.	▌ ✓ William M. Calder (Republican) 48.6%; ▌ Michael E. Butler (Democratic) 47.3%; ▌ Edward T. O'Loughlin (Independence League) 2.3%; ▌ William W. Passage (Socialist) 1.6%; ▌ James W. Manson (Prohibition) 0.2%
New York 7	John J. Fitzgerald	Democratic	1898	Incumbent re-elected.	▌ ✓ John J. Fitzgerald (Democratic) 67.3%; ▌ William R. Koehl (Republican/Ind. League) 31.0%; ▌ Charles H. Matchett (Socialist) 1.5%; ▌ Morris H. Smith (Prohibition) 0.2%
New York 8	Daniel J. Riordan	Democratic	1906	Incumbent re-elected.	▌ ✓ Daniel J. Riordan (Democratic) 66.2%; ▌ George S. Husch (Republican) 26.6%; ▌ Robert McMahon (Independence League) 3.9%; ▌ Isidor Deitelbaum (Socialist) 2.6%; ▌ Benjamin F. Funk (Prohibition) 0.7%
New York 9	Henry M. Goldfogle	Democratic	1900	Incumbent re-elected.	▌ ✓ Henry M. Goldfogle (Democratic) 46.8%; ▌ Meyer London (Socialist) 33.8%; ▌ Jacob W. Block (Republican/Ind. League) 18.8%; ▌ John S. Conroy (Prohibition) 0.6%
New York 10	William Sulzer	Democratic	1894	Incumbent re-elected.	▌ ✓ William Sulzer (Democratic/Ind. League) 60.2%; ▌ Anthony M. McCabe (Republican) 29.4%; ▌ John Mullen (Socialist) 10.4%; ▌ Timothy N. Holden (Prohibition) 0.1%
New York 11	Charles V. Fornes	Democratic	1906	Incumbent re-elected.	▌ ✓ Charles V. Fornes (Democratic) 61.2%; ▌ Henry H. Curran (Republican/Ind. League) 35.8%; ▌ Richard Meade (Socialist) 2.7%; ▌ James H. Duffie (Prohibition) 0.3%
New York 12	Michael F. Conry	Democratic	1908	Incumbent re-elected.	▌ ✓ Michael F. Conry (Democratic) 62.7%; ▌ Peter R. Gatens (Republican/Ind. League) 32.6%; ▌ Joseph Wilson (Socialist) 4.7%; ▌ Thomas D. Stetson (Prohibition) 0.1%
New York 13	Herbert Parsons	Republican	1904	Incumbent lost re-election. Democratic gain.	▌ ✓ Jefferson Monroe Levy (Democratic) 50.4%; ▌ Herbert Parsons (Republican) 43.5%; ▌ Andrew Govan (Independence League) 3.5%; ▌ Arthur D. Chapman (Socialist) 2.4%; ▌ Edward M. Smith (Prohibition) 0.2%
New York 14	William Willett Jr.	Democratic	1906	Incumbent retired. Democratic hold.	▌ ✓ John J. Kindred (Democratic) 54.3%; ▌ Victor H. Duras (Republican/Ind. League) 36.5%; ▌ William Ehret (Socialist) 9.1%; ▌ Joseph H. Ralph (Prohibition) 0.1%
New York 15	J. Van Vechten Olcott	Republican	1904	Incumbent retired. Democratic gain.	▌ ✓ Thomas G. Patten (Democratic/Ind. League) 54.4%; ▌ William M. Bennett (Republican) 43.8%; ▌ John J. Flanagan (Socialist) 1.7%; ▌ Edward A. Parker (Prohibition) 0.1%
New York 16	Francis Burton Harrison	Democratic	1906	Incumbent re-elected.	▌ ✓ Francis Burton Harrison (Democratic) 55.0%; ▌ Samuel B. Thomas (Republican/Civic Action) 34.3%; ▌ George F. Miner (Socialist) 10.6%; ▌ James F. Gillespie (Prohibition) 0.1%
New York 17	William Stiles Bennet	Republican	1904	Incumbent lost re-election. Democratic gain.	▌ ✓ Henry George Jr. (Democratic/Ind. League) 50.7%; ▌ William Stiles Bennet (Republican) 46.6%; ▌ George Oberdorfer (Socialist) 2.5%; ▌ Charles H. Simmons (Prohibition) 0.2%
New York 18	Joseph A. Goulden	Democratic	1902	Incumbent retired. Democratic hold.	▌ ✓ Steven Beckwith Ayres (Democratic) 51.2%; ▌ Gottlieb Haneke (Republican/Ind. League) 42.0%; ▌ Joshua Wanhope (Socialist) 6.6%; ▌ William A. Mapes (Prohibition) 0.2%
New York 19	John Emory Andrus	Republican	1904	Incumbent re-elected.	▌ ✓ John Emory Andrus (Republican) 49.7%; ▌ Cornelius Amory Pugsley (Democratic) 47.7%; ▌ Alfred E. Dixon (Socialist) 2.0%; ▌ Charles A. Brady (Prohibition) 0.6%
New York 20	Thomas W. Bradley	Republican	1902	Incumbent re-elected.	▌ ✓ Thomas W. Bradley (Republican) 51.6%; ▌ John Bigelow (Democratic) 46.2%; ▌ Charles L. Dedrick (Socialist) 1.1%; ▌ William A. White (Prohibition) 1.1%
New York 21	Hamilton Fish II	Republican	1908	Incumbent lost re-election. Democratic gain.	▌ ✓ Richard E. Connell (Democratic) 49.8%; ▌ Hamilton Fish II (Republican) 48.4%; ▌ David F. Slater (Socialist) 1.8%
New York 22	William H. Draper	Republican	1900	Incumbent re-elected.	▌ ✓ William H. Draper (Republican) 51.8%; ▌ Elisha C. Tower (Democratic) 43.8%; ▌ Fred W. Hewitt (Prohibition) 1.7%; ▌ William Nugent (Socialist) 1.6%; ▌ Merritt F. Lee (Independence League) 1.0%
New York 23	George N. Southwick	Republican	1900	Incumbent retired. Republican hold.	▌ ✓ Henry S. De Forest (Republican) 48.1%; ▌ Curtis N. Douglas (Democratic) 44.7%; ▌ Harvey A. Simmons (Socialist) 5.1%; ▌ George H. Houghton (Independence League) 1.1%; ▌ Ellis N. Sipperly (Prohibition) 1.0%
New York 24	George Winthrop Fairchild	Republican	1906	Incumbent re-elected.	▌ ✓ George Winthrop Fairchild (Republican) 49.9%; ▌ George M. Palmer (Democratic) 47.3%; ▌ Newton Youngs (Prohibition) 2.8%
New York 25	Cyrus Durey	Republican	1906	Incumbent lost re-election. Independent Republican gain.	▌ ✓ Theron Akin (Ind. Republican/Dem./Ind. League) 48.9%; ▌ Cyrus Durey (Republican) 48.2%; ▌ R. Foster Stone (Prohibition) 2.9%
New York 26	George R. Malby	Republican	1906	Incumbent re-elected.	▌ ✓ George R. Malby (Republican) 55.7%; ▌ Thomas Cantwell (Democratic) 39.5%; ▌ George B. Humphrey (Prohibition) 3.3%; ▌ Frederick G. Thomas (Socialist) 0.8%; ▌ Earnest C. Gleason (Independence League) 0.7%
New York 27	Charles S. Millington	Republican	1908	Incumbent lost re-election. Democratic gain.	▌ ✓ Charles A. Talcott (Democratic/Ind. League) 50.8%; ▌ Charles S. Millington (Republican) 45.8%; ▌ Arthur L. Byron-Curtiss (Socialist) 1.7%; ▌ Fred W. Barnaclo (Prohibition) 1.7%
New York 28	Charles L. Knapp	Republican	1900	Incumbent retired. Republican hold.	▌ ✓ Luther W. Mott (Republican/Ind. League) 50.1%; ▌ George W. Reeves (Democratic) 41.5%; ▌ Charles F. Simpson (Prohibition) 6.7%; ▌ Thomas H. Lynch (Socialist) 1.7%
New York 29	Michael E. Driscoll	Republican	1898	Incumbent re-elected.	▌ ✓ Michael E. Driscoll (Republican) 52.5%; ▌ Henry E. Wilson (Democratic/Ind. League) 40.0%; ▌ George L. Casler (Socialist) 4.7%; ▌ William G. Morrell (Prohibition) 2.8%
New York 30	John W. Dwight	Republican	1902	Incumbent re-elected.	▌ ✓ John W. Dwight (Republican) 49.2%; ▌ Ira H. Hix (Democratic/Ind. League) 41.4%; ▌ Frank D. Reese (Prohibition) 8.0%; ▌ Charles G. Brown (Socialist) 1.4%
New York 31	Sereno E. Payne	Republican	1889	Incumbent re-elected.	▌ ✓ Sereno E. Payne (Republican) 51.8%; ▌ John Colmey (Democratic) 43.5%; ▌ Preston Wright (Socialist) 2.7%; ▌ Delos J. Cotton (Prohibition) 2.0%
New York 32	James S. Havens	Democratic	1910	Incumbent retired. Republican gain.	▌ ✓ Henry G. Danforth (Republican) 52.7%; ▌ George P. Decker (Democratic) 42.3%; ▌ Herbert E. Steiner (Socialist) 4.1%; ▌ W. B. Palliser (Prohibition) 0.9%
New York 33	Jacob Sloat Fassett	Republican	1904	Incumbent lost re-election. Democratic gain.	▌ ✓ Edwin S. Underhill (Democratic) 49.5%; ▌ Jacob Sloat Fassett (Republican) 44.5%; ▌ Menzo C. Beardsley (Prohibition) 3.5%; ▌ James T. Agan (Socialist) 1.6%; ▌ Emmett D. Hees (Independence League) 0.9%
New York 34	James S. Simmon	Republican	1908	Incumbent re-elected.	▌ ✓ James S. Simmon (Republican) 54.0%; ▌ Elliot W. Horton (Democratic) 41.6%; ▌ William V. Blighton (Prohibition) 3.6%; ▌ Frederick Hart (Independence League) 0.8%
New York 35	Daniel A. Driscoll	Democratic	1908	Incumbent re-elected.	▌ ✓ Daniel A. Driscoll (Democratic/Ind. League) 56.9%; ▌ Patrick J. Keeler (Republican) 38.3%; ▌ Samuel F. Leary (Socialist) 4.5%; ▌ Joseph A. Dixon (Prohibition) 0.3%
New York 36	De Alva S. Alexander	Republican	1896	Incumbent lost re-election. Democratic gain.	▌ ✓ Charles Bennett Smith (Democratic/Ind. League) 48.9%; ▌ De Alva S. Alexander (Republican) 48.8%; ▌ William G. Roberts (Socialist) 2.3%
New York 37	Edward B. Vreeland	Republican	1899	Incumbent re-elected.	▌ ✓ Edward B. Vreeland (Republican) 53.1%; ▌ J. William Sanbury (Democratic/Ind. League) 37.0%; ▌ Arthur A. Amidon (Prohibition) 5.4%; ▌ Godfrey J. Klebsattel (Socialist) 4.5%

== North Carolina ==
District	Incumbent			This race	
District	Member	Party	First elected	Results	Candidates
North Carolina 1	John H. Small	Democratic	1898	Incumbent re-elected.	▌ ✓ John H. Small (Democratic) 75.3%; ▌ Henry T. King (Republican) 24.3%
North Carolina 2	Claude Kitchin	Democratic	1900	Incumbent re-elected.	▌ ✓ Claude Kitchin (Democratic) 85.1%; ▌ R. H. Norfleet (Republican) 14.8%
North Carolina 3	Charles R. Thomas	Democratic	1898	Incumbent lost renomination. Democratic hold.	▌ ✓ John M. Faison (Democratic) 58.1%; ▌ George E. Butler (Republican) 41.8%
North Carolina 4	Edward W. Pou	Democratic	1900	Incumbent re-elected.	▌ ✓ Edward W. Pou (Democratic) 65.8%; ▌ R. A. P. Cooley (Republican) 34.1%
North Carolina 5	John Motley Morehead II	Republican	1908	Incumbent retired. Democratic gain.	▌ ✓ Charles M. Stedman (Democratic) 54.2%; ▌ David H. Blair (Republican) 45.3%
North Carolina 6	Hannibal L. Godwin	Democratic	1906	Incumbent re-elected.	▌ ✓ Hannibal L. Godwin (Democratic) 71.7%; ▌ Iredell Meares (Republican) 28.3%
North Carolina 7	Robert N. Page	Democratic	1902	Incumbent re-elected.	▌ ✓ Robert N. Page (Democratic) 56.5%; ▌ John J. Parker (Republican) 43.3%
North Carolina 8	Charles H. Cowles	Republican	1908	Incumbent lost re-election. Democratic gain.	▌ ✓ Robert L. Doughton (Democratic) 51.1%; ▌ Charles H. Cowles (Republican) 48.8%
North Carolina 9	E. Yates Webb	Democratic	1902	Incumbent re-elected.	▌ ✓ E. Yates Webb (Democratic) 59.3%; ▌ S. S. McNinch (Republican) 40.6%
North Carolina 10	John Gaston Grant	Republican	1908	Incumbent lost re-election. Democratic gain.	▌ ✓ James M. Gudger Jr. (Democratic) 51.8%; ▌ John Gaston Grant (Republican) 48.1%

== North Dakota ==
District	Incumbent			This race	
District	Member	Party	First elected	Results	Candidates
North Dakota at-large 2 seats on a general ticket	Louis B. Hanna	Republican	1908	Incumbent re-elected.	▌ ✓ Louis B. Hanna (Republican) 32.27%; ▌ ✓ Henry T. Helgesen (Republican) 31.67%; ▌Tobias D. Casey (Democratic) 16.20%; ▌M. A. Hildreth (Democratic) 15.85%; ▌Arthur Hagendorf (Socialist) 2.02%; ▌N. H. Bjornstad (Socialist) 1.99%
North Dakota at-large 2 seats on a general ticket	Asle Gronna	Republican	1904	Incumbent retired to run for U.S. senator. Republican hold.	▌ ✓ Louis B. Hanna (Republican) 32.27%; ▌ ✓ Henry T. Helgesen (Republican) 31.67%; ▌Tobias D. Casey (Democratic) 16.20%; ▌M. A. Hildreth (Democratic) 15.85%; ▌Arthur Hagendorf (Socialist) 2.02%; ▌N. H. Bjornstad (Socialist) 1.99%

== Ohio ==
District	Incumbent			This race	
District	Member	Party	First elected	Results	Candidates
Ohio 1	Nicholas Longworth	Republican	1902	Incumbent re-elected.	▌ ✓ Nicholas Longworth (Republican) 51.1%; ▌ Thomas P. Hart (Democratic) 44.9%; ▌ Thomas Hammersmith (Socialist) 3.7%; ▌ John Robertson (Prohibition) 0.3%
Ohio 2	Herman P. Goebel	Republican	1902	Incumbent lost re-election. Democratic gain.	▌ ✓ Alfred G. Allen (Democratic) 47.9%; ▌ Herman P. Goebel (Republican) 47.0%; ▌ Louis F. Schwickert (Socialist) 4.5%; ▌ John G. Reed (Independent Republican) 0.4%; ▌ Lavias C. Fillmore (Prohibition) 0.2%
Ohio 3	James M. Cox	Democratic	1908	Incumbent re-elected.	▌ ✓ James M. Cox (Democratic) 55.5%; ▌ George R. Young (Republican) 33.0%; ▌ Harmon Evans (Socialist) 11.0%; ▌ Richard E. O'Bryne (Prohibition) 0.5%
Ohio 4	William E. Tou Velle	Democratic	1906	Incumbent retired. Democratic hold.	▌ ✓ J. Henry Goeke (Democratic) 58.4%; ▌ C. E. Johnston (Republican) 37.7%; ▌ Arthur A. Hensch (Socialist) 3.9%
Ohio 5	Timothy T. Ansberry	Democratic	1906	Incumbent reelected.	▌ ✓ Timothy T. Ansberry (Democratic) 60.1%; ▌ C. S. Roe (Republican) 37.7%; ▌ Allen Jackson (Socialist) 1.7%; ▌ S. F. Welty (Prohibition) 0.5%
Ohio 6	Matthew Denver	Democratic	1906	Incumbent re-elected.	▌ ✓ Matthew Denver (Democratic) 54.0%; ▌ Jesse Taylor (Republican) 46.0%
Ohio 7	J. Warren Keifer	Republican	1904	Incumbent lost re-election. Democratic gain.	▌ ✓ James D. Post (Democratic) 52.8%; ▌ J. Warren Keifer (Republican) 44.6%; ▌ John L. Smith (Socialist) 2.2%; ▌ C. E. Hill (Prohibition) 0.4%
Ohio 8	Ralph D. Cole	Republican	1904	Incumbent lost renomination. Republican hold.	▌ ✓ Frank B. Willis (Republican) 50.0%; ▌ Thomas C. Mahon (Democratic) 46.4%; ▌ Arthur G. Parthemer (Socialist) 3.6%
Ohio 9	Isaac R. Sherwood	Democratic	1906	Incumbent reelected.	▌ ✓ Isaac R. Sherwood (Democratic) 48.0%; ▌ James Kent Hamilton (Republican) 43.0%; ▌ W. F. Ries (Socialist) 8.6%; ▌ M. A. Gibson (Prohibition) 0.4%
Ohio 10	Adna R. Johnson	Republican	1908	Incumbent declined renomination. Republican hold.	▌ ✓ Robert M. Switzer (Republican) 51.3%; ▌Charles M. Caldwell (Democratic) 45.0%; ▌ George A. Mooney (Socialist) 3.1%; ▌ W. J. Henry (Prohibition) 0.6%
Ohio 11	Albert Douglas	Republican	1906	Incumbent lost re-election. Democratic gain.	▌ ✓ Horatio C. Claypool (Democratic) 49.9%; ▌ Albert Douglas (Republican) 44.0%; ▌ Austin B. Shinn (Socialist) 5.2%; ▌ C. H. Creamer (Prohibition) 0.9%
Ohio 12	Edward L. Taylor Jr.	Republican	1904	Incumbent re-elected.	▌ ✓ Edward L. Taylor Jr. (Republican) 39.9%; ▌ Frank S. Monnett (Democratic) 34.2%; ▌ Jacob L. Bachman (Socialist) 25.1%; ▌ Alfred B. Paul (Prohibition) 0.8%
Ohio 13	Carl C. Anderson	Democratic	1908	Incumbent re-elected.	▌ ✓ Carl C. Anderson (Democratic) 63.7%; ▌ Miles H. McLaughlin (Republican) 32.7%; ▌ Arthur B. Hollenbaugh (Socialist) 3.2%; ▌ E. A. Bryan (Prohibition) 0.4%
Ohio 14	William G. Sharp	Democratic	1908	Incumbent re-elected.	▌ ✓ William G. Sharp (Democratic) 54.6%; ▌ George Henry Chamberlain (Republican) 39.8%; ▌ Charles M. Zitzer (Socialist) 4.9%; ▌ H. H. Mosher (Prohibition) 0.7%
Ohio 15	James Joyce	Republican	1908	Incumbent lost re-election. Democratic gain.	▌ ✓ George White (Democratic) 49.3%; ▌James Joyce (Republican) 44.2%; ▌ Frank B. Martin (Socialist) 5.6%; ▌ Leslie E. Hawk (Prohibition) 0.9%
Ohio 16	David Hollingsworth	Republican	1908	Incumbent lost re-election. Democratic gain.	▌ ✓ William B. Francis (Democratic) 46.6%; ▌ David Hollingsworth (Republican) 45.4%; ▌ Robert J. Murray (Socialist) 6.9%; ▌ Abel J. Crawford (Prohibition) 1.2%
Ohio 17	William A. Ashbrook	Democratic	1906	Incumbent re-elected.	▌ ✓ William A. Ashbrook (Democratic) 59.3%; ▌ A. B. Critchfield (Republican) 34.3%; ▌ Edward Schmidt (Socialist) 5.8%; ▌ John H. Dickason (Prohibition) 0.6%
Ohio 18	James Kennedy	Republican	1902	Incumbent lost re-election. Democratic gain.	▌ ✓ John J. Whitacre (Democratic) 46.6%; ▌ James Kennedy (Republican) 40.8%; ▌ Thomas Williams (Socialist) 9.7%; ▌ Elias Jenkins (Prohibition) 2.9%
Ohio 19	W. Aubrey Thomas	Republican	1904	Incumbent lost re-election. Democratic gain.	▌ ✓ Ellsworth R. Bathrick (Democratic) 46.0%; ▌ W. Aubrey Thomas (Republican) 43.7%; ▌ Paul G. Miller (Socialist) 8.9%; ▌ A. M. Bird (Prohibition) 1.4%
Ohio 20	L. Paul Howland	Republican	1906	Incumbent re-elected.	▌ ✓ L. Paul Howland (Republican) 46.8%; ▌ William Gordon (Democratic) 46.4%; ▌ John G. Willert (Socialist) 6.4%; ▌ Charles Bartlett (Prohibition) 0.4%
Ohio 21	James H. Cassidy	Republican	1909	Incumbent lost re-election. Democratic gain.	▌ ✓ Robert J. Bulkley (Democratic) 48.1%; ▌ James H. Cassidy (Republican) 44.5%; ▌ Karl A. Cheyney (Socialist) 7.1%; ▌ J. Walter Malone (Prohibition) 0.3%

== Oklahoma ==
District	Incumbent			This race	
District	Member	Party	First elected	Results	Candidates
Oklahoma 1	Bird S. McGuire	Republican	1907	Incumbent re-elected.	▌ ✓ Bird S. McGuire (Republican) 49.2%; ▌Neil E. McNeil (Democratic) 44.6%; ▌W. L. Reynolds (Socialist) 6.1%
Oklahoma 2	Dick T. Morgan	Republican	1908	Incumbent re-elected.	▌ ✓ Dick T. Morgan (Republican) 46.0%; ▌Elmer L. Fulton (Democratic) 44.0%; ▌H. I. Bryant (Socialist) 9.8%
Oklahoma 3	Charles E. Creager	Republican	1908	Incumbent lost re-election. Democratic gain.	▌ ✓ James S. Davenport (Democratic) 50.6%; ▌Charles E. Creager (Republican) 43.5%; ▌G. M. Snyder (Socialist) 5.8%
Oklahoma 4	Charles D. Carter	Democratic	1907	Incumbent re-elected.	▌ ✓ Charles D. Carter (Democratic) 55.6%; ▌Charles M. Campbell (Republican) 30.3%; ▌J. N. Gilmore (Socialist) 14.0%
Oklahoma 5	Scott Ferris	Democratic	1907	Incumbent re-elected.	▌ ✓ Scott Ferris (Democratic) 58.8%; ▌J. H. Franklin (Republican) 27.6%; ▌H. H. Stallard (Socialist) 13.4%

== Oregon ==
District	Incumbent			This race	
District	Member	Party	First elected	Results	Candidates
Oregon 1	Willis C. Hawley	Republican	1906	Incumbent re-elected.	▌ ✓ Willis C. Hawley (Republican) 48.58%; ▌R. G. Smith (Democratic) 33.74%; ▌C. W. Sherman (Socialist) 9.20%; ▌W. P. Elmore (Prohibition) 8.48%
Oregon 2	William R. Ellis	Republican	1906	Incumbent lost renomination. Republican hold.	▌ ✓ Walter Lafferty (Republican) 51.79%; ▌John Manning (Democratic) 32.92%; ▌William A. Crawford (Socialist) 9.44%; ▌George B. Pratt (Prohibition) 5.86%

== Pennsylvania ==
District	Incumbent			This race	
District	Member	Party	First elected	Results	Candidates
Pennsylvania 1	Henry H. Bingham	Republican	1878	Incumbent re-elected.	▌ ✓ Henry H. Bingham (Republican) 69.9%; ▌ Henry V. Garrett (Keystone) 22.0%; ▌ Michael J. Geraghty (Democratic) 6.6%; ▌ James F. Lynch (Socialist) 1.5%
Pennsylvania 2	Joel Cook	Republican	1907	Incumbent re-elected.	▌ ✓ Joel Cook (Republican) 69.4%; ▌ Daniel W. Simpkins (Keystone) 21.4%; ▌ Edward B. Seiberlich (Democratic) 7.1%; ▌ Charles Miller (Socialist) 1.9%; ▌ William S. Umstead (Prohibition) 0.2%
Pennsylvania 3	J. Hampton Moore	Republican	1906	Incumbent re-elected.	▌ ✓ J. Hampton Moore (Republican) 69.2%; ▌ James G. Ramsdell (Keystone) 20.3%; ▌ William A. Hayes (Democratic) 7.8%; ▌ Felix Heinzel (Socialist) 2.3%; ▌ Samuel D. Strohm (City) 0.4%
Pennsylvania 4	Reuben Moon	Republican	1903	Incumbent re-elected.	▌ ✓ Reuben Moon (Republican) 72.6%; ▌ Albert W. Sanson (City) 11.2%; ▌ William C. Mitchell (Democratic) 10.9%; ▌ Josef Doerr (Socialist) 4.7%; ▌ Henry C. Russell (Prohibition) 0.6%
Pennsylvania 5	William W. Foulkrod	Republican	1906	Incumbent lost re-election and died before end of term. Democratic gain.	▌ ✓ Michael Donohoe (Democratic/Keystone) 48.4%; ▌ William W. Foulkrod (Republican) 45.4%; ▌ Martin McCue (Socialist) 5.9%; ▌ Marion Benjamin (Prohibition) 0.3%
Pennsylvania 6	George D. McCreary	Republican	1902	Incumbent re-elected.	▌ ✓ George D. McCreary (Republican) 46.2%; ▌ Frank H. Hawkins (Keystone) 42.5%; ▌ William Carr (Democratic) 7.8%; ▌ George A. Marr (Socialist) 2.1%; ▌ Wharton Barker (Independent) 1.1%; ▌ George B. Cook (Prohibition) 0.3%
Pennsylvania 7	Thomas S. Butler	Republican	1896	Incumbent re-elected.	▌ ✓ Thomas S. Butler (Republican) 51.7%; ▌ Eugene C. Bonniwell (Keystone/Democratic) 45.5%; ▌ Walter N. Lodge (Socialist) 1.6%; ▌ Joseph H. Paschall (Prohibition) 1.2%
Pennsylvania 8	Irving P. Wanger	Republican	1892	Incumbent lost re-election. Democratic gain.	▌ ✓ Robert E. Difenderfer (Democratic/Keystone) 49.6%; ▌ Irving P. Wanger (Republican) 48.1%; ▌ Henry J. Weisser (Socialist) 2.3%
Pennsylvania 9	William Walton Griest	Republican	1908	Incumbent re-elected.	▌ ✓ William Walton Griest (Republican) 79.1%; ▌ James G. McSparran (Democratic) 16.8%; ▌ Daniel S. Von Neida (Prohibition) 2.2%; ▌ Elmer Smith (Socialist) 1.9%
Pennsylvania 10	Thomas D. Nicholls	Democratic	1906	Incumbent retired. Republican gain.	▌ ✓ John R. Farr (Republican) 50.4%; ▌ Patrick F. Calpin (Democratic) 42.1%; ▌ Howard J. Force (Prohibition) 4.9%; ▌ L. H. Gibbs (Socialist) 2.6%
Pennsylvania 11	Henry W. Palmer	Republican	1908	Incumbent retired. Republican hold.	▌ ✓ Charles C. Bowman (Republican) 47.5%; ▌ George R. McLean (Democratic) 45.7%; ▌ Charles F. Quinn (Socialist) 6.9%
Pennsylvania 12	Alfred B. Garner	Republican	1908	Incumbent lost renomination. Democratic gain.	▌ ✓ Robert Emmett Lee (Democratic) 40.1%; ▌ Robert D. Heaton (Republican) 39.9%; ▌ Cornelius F. Foley (Socialist) 20.0%
Pennsylvania 13	John H. Rothermel	Democratic	1906	Incumbent re-elected.	▌ ✓ John H. Rothermel (Democratic) 49.8%; ▌ John K. Hahn (Republican) 32.7%; ▌ Caleb Harrison (Socialist) 15.7%; ▌ Martin Miller (Prohibition) 1.8%
Pennsylvania 14	Charles C. Pratt	Republican	1908	Incumbent lost re-election. Democratic gain.	▌ ✓ George W. Kipp (Democratic/Keystone) 49.0%; ▌ Charles C. Pratt (Republican) 45.2%; ▌ James A. Hodgins (Prohibition) 4.6%; ▌ Sidney R. Matteson (Socialist) 1.2%
Pennsylvania 15	William B. Wilson	Democratic	1906	Incumbent re-elected.	▌ ✓ William B. Wilson (Democratic) 49.7%; ▌ Clarence L. Peaslee (Republican) 38.6%; ▌ Clarence C. Ricker (Socialist) 7.3%; ▌ Stephen Soars (Prohibition) 4.4%
Pennsylvania 16	John G. McHenry	Democratic	1906	Incumbent re-elected.	▌ ✓ John G. McHenry (Democratic/Republican) 53.0%; ▌ Theodore C. Harter (Keystone) 26.8%; ▌ Jacob W. Renn (Socialist) 16.1%; ▌ William Hart (Prohibition) 4.1%
Pennsylvania 17	Benjamin K. Focht	Republican	1906	Incumbent re-elected.	▌ ✓ Benjamin K. Focht (Republican) 50.8%; ▌ J. Murray Africa (Democratic) 41.0%; ▌ J. Emory Weeks (Prohibition) 4.7%; ▌ John A. Horn (Socialist) 3.5%
Pennsylvania 18	Marlin E. Olmsted	Republican	1896	Incumbent re-elected.	▌ ✓ Marlin E. Olmsted (Republican) 59.7%; ▌ W. Jonathan Kiefer (Democratic) 32.9%; ▌ James V. Zerbe (Socialist) 4.6%; ▌ F. Harry Hoffer (Prohibition) 2.8%
Pennsylvania 19	John Merriman Reynolds	Republican	1904	Incumbent resigned to become Lieutenant Governor of Pennsylvania. Republican hold.	▌ ✓ Jesse L. Hartman (Republican) 60.4%; ▌ Isaiah Scheenline (Democratic) 25.5%; ▌ Stewart C. Cowan (Prohibition) 7.2%; ▌ Anslem B. Kirsch (Socialist) 6.8%
Pennsylvania 20	Daniel F. Lafean	Republican	1902	Incumbent re-elected.	▌ ✓ Daniel F. Lafean (Republican) 50.9%; ▌ Andrew R. Brodbeck (Democratic) 44.7%; ▌ William Kelly (Socialist) 2.8%; ▌ Abia Smucker (Prohibition) 1.5%
Pennsylvania 21	Charles Frederick Barclay	Republican	1906	Incumbent retired. Republican hold.	▌ ✓ Charles E. Patton (Republican) 56.0%; ▌ William C. Heinle (Democratic) 32.6%; ▌ George W. Fox (Socialist) 11.3%
Pennsylvania 22	George F. Huff	Republican	1902	Incumbent retired. Democratic gain.	▌ ✓ Curtis H. Gregg (Democratic/Keystone) 42.3%; ▌ J. David McJunkin (Republican) 40.7%; ▌ Robert Dudley (Socialist) 10.6%; ▌ E. S. Littell (Prohibition) 6.5%
Pennsylvania 23	Allen F. Cooper	Republican	1902	Incumbent retired. Republican hold.	▌ ✓ Thomas S. Crago (Republican) 52.9%; ▌ Jesse H. Wise (Democratic/Keystone) 34.4%; ▌ Washington Herd (Socialist) 7.9%; ▌ J. C. Speicher (Prohibition) 4.7%
Pennsylvania 24	John K. Tener	Republican	1908	Incumbent resigned to become Governor of Pennsylvania. Republican hold.	▌ ✓ Charles Matthews (Republican) 44.1%; ▌ Henry H. Wilson (Democratic/Keystone) 41.8%; ▌ Charles A. Collins (Socialist) 9.7%; ▌ M. S. Marquis (Prohibition) 4.4%
Pennsylvania 25	Arthur L. Bates	Republican	1900	Incumbent re-elected.	▌ ✓ Arthur L. Bates (Republican) 46.4%; ▌ John B. Brooks (Democratic/Keystone) 41.9%; ▌ George B. Allen (Socialist) 6.0%; ▌ Richard A. Buzza (Prohibition) 5.7%
Pennsylvania 26	A. Mitchell Palmer	Democratic	1908	Incumbent re-elected.	▌ ✓ A. Mitchell Palmer (Democratic) 61.3%; ▌ Robert Brown (Republican) 33.4%; ▌ Edward R. Evans (Socialist) 3.3%; ▌ Arthur E. Meaker (Prohibition) 2.0%
Pennsylvania 27	J. N. Langham	Republican	1908	Incumbent re-elected.	▌ ✓ J. N. Langham (Republican) 58.8%; ▌ John Smith Shirley (Democratic) 24.5%; ▌ John Houk (Prohibition) 11.1%; ▌ M. A. Van Horn (Socialist) 5.6%
Pennsylvania 28	Nelson P. Wheeler	Republican	1906	Incumbent lost renomination. Republican hold.	▌ ✓ Peter Moore Speer (Republican) 41.7%; ▌ William J. Breene (Democratic) 36.2%; ▌ John E. Gill (Prohibition) 11.6%; ▌ John R. McKeown (Socialist) 8.3%; ▌ William Looser (Labor) 2.2%
Pennsylvania 29	William H. Graham	Republican	1904	Incumbent lost renomination. Republican hold.	▌ ✓ Stephen G. Porter (Republican) 74.2%; ▌ George T. McConnell (Socialist) 12.4%; ▌ Fleming Jamieson (Democratic) 10.6%; ▌ John A. McConnell (Prohibition) 2.8%
Pennsylvania 30	John Dalzell	Republican	1886	Incumbent re-elected.	▌ ✓ John Dalzell (Republican) 46.5%; ▌ Robert J. Black (Prohibition/Labor) 27.4%; ▌ James A. Wakefield (Democratic/Keystone) 14.8%; ▌ W. J. Wright (Socialist) 10.3%; ▌ James A. Fulton (Independent) 1.0%
Pennsylvania 31	James F. Burke	Republican	1904	Incumbent re-elected.	▌ ✓ James F. Burke (Republican) 64.5%; ▌ John J. Thorpe (Democratic/Keystone) 28.8%; ▌ John Connor (Socialist) 5.8%; ▌C. L. Thurgood (Prohibition) 0.9%
Pennsylvania 32	Andrew J. Barchfeld	Republican	1904	Incumbent re-elected.	▌ ✓ Andrew J. Barchfeld (Republican) 49.7%; ▌ Hermann L. Hegner (Democratic/Keystone) 36.6%; ▌ Valentine Remmel (Socialist) 11.6%; ▌ James L. McKee (Prohibition) 2.1%

== Rhode Island ==
District	Incumbent			This race	
District	Member	Party	First elected	Results	Candidates
Rhode Island 1	William Paine Sheffield Jr.	Republican	1908	Incumbent lost re-election. Democratic gain.	▌ ✓ George F. O'Shaunessy (Democratic) 51.3%; ▌ William Paine Sheffield Jr. (Republican) 45.9%; ▌ Stanley Curtis (Socialist) 1.5%; ▌ Richard R. Macomber (Prohibition) 1.3%
Rhode Island 2	Adin B. Capron	Republican	1896	Incumbent retired. Republican hold.	▌ ✓ George H. Utter (Republican) 57.2%; ▌ John Cooney (Democratic) 41.3%; ▌ Bernon E. Helme (Prohibition) 1.5%

== South Carolina ==
District	Incumbent	Party	First elected	Result	Candidates
South Carolina 1	George Swinton Legaré	Democratic	1902	Incumbent re-elected.	▌ ✓ George Swinton Legaré (Democratic) 97.4%; ▌Aaron P. Prioleau (Republican) 2.1%; ▌William Eberhard (Socialist) 0.5%
South Carolina 2	James O. Patterson	Democratic	1904	Incumbent lost renomination. Democratic hold.	▌ ✓ James F. Byrnes (Democratic) 100%
South Carolina 3	Wyatt Aiken	Democratic	1902	Incumbent re-elected.	▌ ✓ Wyatt Aiken (Democratic) 99.9%; Others 0.1%
South Carolina 4	Joseph T. Johnson	Democratic	1900	Incumbent re-elected.	▌ ✓ Joseph T. Johnson (Democratic) 98.9%; ▌Thomas Brier (Republican) 1.1%
South Carolina 5	David E. Finley	Democratic	1898	Incumbent re-elected.	▌ ✓ David E. Finley (Democratic) 100%
South Carolina 6	J. Edwin Ellerbe	Democratic	1904	Incumbent re-elected.	▌ ✓ J. Edwin Ellerbe (Democratic) 100%
South Carolina 7	A. Frank Lever	Democratic	1901 (special)	Incumbent re-elected.	▌ ✓ A. Frank Lever (Democratic) 95.6%; ▌R. H. Richardson (Republican) 4.3%; Others 0.1%

== South Dakota ==
District	Incumbent			This race	
District	Member	Party	First elected	Results	Candidates
South Dakota at-large (2 seats elected on a general ticket)	Charles H. Burke	Republican	1908	Incumbent re-elected.	▌ ✓ Charles H. Burke (Republican) 31.73%; ▌ ✓ Eben Martin (Republican) 31.59%; ▌W. W. Soule (Democratic) 16.00%; ▌John E. Kelley (Democratic) 15.84%; ▌Knute Lewis (Prohibition) 2.03%; ▌W. J. Edgar (Prohibition) 2.02%; ▌Isaac M. Burnside (Independent) 0.80%
South Dakota at-large (2 seats elected on a general ticket)	Eben Martin	Republican	1908	Incumbent re-elected.	▌ ✓ Charles H. Burke (Republican) 31.73%; ▌ ✓ Eben Martin (Republican) 31.59%; ▌W. W. Soule (Democratic) 16.00%; ▌John E. Kelley (Democratic) 15.84%; ▌Knute Lewis (Prohibition) 2.03%; ▌W. J. Edgar (Prohibition) 2.02%; ▌Isaac M. Burnside (Independent) 0.80%

== Tennessee ==
District	Incumbent			This race	
District	Member	Party	First elected	Results	Candidates
Tennessee 1	Zachary D. Massey	Republican	1910 (special)	Incumbent retired. Republican hold.	▌ ✓ Sam R. Sells (Republican) 73.95%; ▌Cyrus H. Lyle (Democratic) 26.05%
Tennessee 2	Richard W. Austin	Republican	1908	Incumbent re-elected.	▌ ✓ Richard W. Austin (Republican) 57.28%; ▌Nathan W. Hale (Republican) 42.72%
Tennessee 3	John A. Moon	Democratic	1896	Incumbent re-elected.	▌ ✓ John A. Moon (Democratic) 56.87%; ▌Charles R. Evans (Republican) 41.72%; ▌C. W. Crouch (Socialist) 1.41%
Tennessee 4	Cordell Hull	Democratic	1906	Incumbent re-elected.	▌ ✓ Cordell Hull (Democratic) 78.87%; ▌J. T. Odum (Ind. Democratic) 21.13%
Tennessee 5	William C. Houston	Democratic	1904	Incumbent re-elected.	▌ ✓ William C. Houston (Democratic) 98.99%; ▌N. Bartlett (Socialist) 1.01%
Tennessee 6	Jo Byrns	Democratic	1908	Incumbent re-elected.	▌ ✓ Jo Byrns (Democratic) 87.01%; ▌W. H. Jackson (Socialist) 12.99%
Tennessee 7	Lemuel P. Padgett	Democratic	1900	Incumbent re-elected.	▌ ✓ Lemuel P. Padgett (Democratic) 96.77%; ▌Daniel McCord (Independent) 2.06%; ▌B. F. Gaunt (Socialist) 1.17%
Tennessee 8	Thetus W. Sims	Democratic	1896	Incumbent re-elected.	▌ ✓ Thetus W. Sims (Democratic) 57.91%; ▌S. E. Murrey (Republican) 41.48%; ▌F. W. Earnshaw (Socialist) 0.61%
Tennessee 9	Finis J. Garrett	Democratic	1904	Incumbent re-elected.	▌ ✓ Finis J. Garrett (Democratic) 85.75%; ▌J. W. Brown (Republican) 8.10%; ▌W. R. Landrum (Ind. Republican) 5.37%; ▌W. P. Outlaw (Socialist) 0.78%
Tennessee 10	George Gordon	Democratic	1906	Incumbent re-elected.	▌ ✓ George Gordon (Democratic) 94.75%; ▌T. H. Haines (Socialist) 5.25%

== Texas ==
District	Incumbent			This race	
District	Member	Party	First elected	Results	Candidates
Texas 1	Morris Sheppard	Democratic	1902	Incumbent re-elected.	▌ ✓ Morris Sheppard (Democratic) 87.4%; ▌ Velmar Antle (Republican) 9.4%; ▌ W. H. Hicks (Socialist) 3.2%
Texas 2	Martin Dies	Democratic	1908	Incumbent re-elected	▌ ✓ Martin Dies (Democratic) 94.4%; ▌ W. J. Collier (Republican) 4.7%; ▌ George W. Eason (Socialist) 0.8%
Texas 3	Robert M. Lively	Democratic	1910	Incumbent retired. Democratic hold.	▌ ✓ James Young (Democratic) 98.9%; ▌ R. B. Eldor (Republican) 1.1%
Texas 4	Choice B. Randell	Democratic	1900	Incumbent re-elected.	▌ ✓ Choice B. Randell (Democratic) 88.9%; ▌ C. A. Gray (Republican) 11.1%
Texas 5	James Andrew Beall	Democratic	1902	Incumbent re-elected	▌ ✓ James Andrew Beall (Democratic) 95.0%; ▌ C. G. Schwartz (Socialist) 2.5%; ▌ M. T. Connor (Republican) 1.7%; ▌ Z. Gilder (Socialist Labor) 0.9%
Texas 6	Rufus Hardy	Democratic	1906	Incumbent re-elected	▌ ✓ Rufus Hardy (Democratic) 97.9%; ▌ T. A. Wilson (Republican) 2.1%
Texas 7	Alexander W. Gregg	Democratic	1902	Incumbent re-elected	▌ ✓ Alexander W. Gregg (Democratic) 88.2%; ▌ Willis Kendall (Republican) 11.3%; ▌ N. J. Gum (Socialist) 0.5%
Texas 8	John M. Moore	Democratic	1905	Incumbent re-elected.	▌ ✓ John M. Moore (Democratic) 90.4%; ▌ A. M. Lawson (Republican) 8.6%; ▌ James M. Lairson (Socialist) 1.0%
Texas 9	George F. Burgess	Democratic	1900	Incumbent re-elected	▌ ✓ George F. Burgess (Democratic) 78.0%; ▌ E. C. Webster (Republican) 16.1%; ▌ Frank Hubbell (Socialist) 3.8%
Texas 10	Albert S. Burleson	Democratic	1898	Incumbent re-elected	▌ ✓ Albert S. Burleson (Democratic) 100%
Texas 11	Robert L. Henry	Democratic	1896	Incumbent re-elected	▌ ✓ Robert L. Henry (Democratic) 98.6%; ▌ E. J. Vesey (Republican) 1.4%
Texas 12	Oscar W. Gillespie	Democratic	1902	Incumbent retired. Democratic hold.	▌ ✓ Oscar Callaway (Democratic) 82.0%; ▌ Robert G. Martin (Socialist) 9.9%; ▌ C. C. Littleton (Republican) 6.5%; ▌ N. C. Pile (Prohibition) 1.6%
Texas 13	John H. Stephens	Democratic	1896	Incumbent re-elected	▌ ✓ John H. Stephens (Democratic) 83.4%; ▌ T. S. Bugbee (Republican) 8.7%; ▌ John I. Green (Socialist) 6.4%; ▌ E. G. Cook (Prohibition) 1.5%
Texas 14	James L. Slayden	Democratic	1896	Incumbent re-elected	▌ ✓ James L. Slayden (Democratic) 94.8%; ▌ J. M. Prier (Socialist) 3.6%; ▌ A. L. Horne (Republican) 1.6%
Texas 15	John Nance Garner	Democratic	1902	Incumbent re-elected	▌ ✓ John Nance Garner (Democratic) 71.7%; ▌ Noah Allen (Republican) 26.5%; ▌ Oscar Krohn (Socialist) 1.8%
Texas 16	William R. Smith	Democratic	1902	Incumbent re-elected	▌ ✓ William R. Smith (Democratic) 85.4%; ▌ W. H. Harvey (Socialist) 8.2%; ▌ Robert A. Webb (Republican) 6.5%

== Utah ==
District	Incumbent			This race	
District	Member	Party	First elected	Results	Candidates
Utah at-large	Joseph Howell	Republican	1902	Incumbent re-elected.	▌ ✓ Joseph Howell (Republican) 49.5%; ▌ Ferdinand Erickson (Democratic) 32.0%; ▌ Allen T. Sanford (American) 13.7%; ▌ James A Smith (Socialist) 4.8%

== Vermont ==
District	Incumbent			This race	
District	Member	Party	First elected	Results	Candidates
Vermont 1	David J. Foster	Republican	1900	Incumbent re-elected.	▌ ✓ David J. Foster (Republican) 68.6%; ▌P. M. Meldon (Democratic) 29.7%; ▌George A. Thrall (Prohibition) 1.7%
Vermont 2	Frank Plumley	Republican	1908	Incumbent re-elected.	▌ ✓ Frank Plumley (Republican) 73.4%; ▌Alexander Cochran (Democratic) 25.1%; ▌Eugene M. Campbell (Prohibition) 1.5%

== Virginia ==
District	Incumbent			This race	
District	Member	Party	First elected	Results	Candidates
Virginia 1	William A. Jones	Democratic	1890	Incumbent re-elected.	▌ ✓ William A. Jones (Democratic) 79.9%; ▌George N. Wise (Republican) 19.4%; Others: ▌F. L. Townsend (Socialist) 0.4%; ▌Edward Schade (Socialist Labor) 0.4%
Virginia 2	Harry L. Maynard	Democratic	1900	Incumbent lost renomination. Democratic hold.	▌ ✓ Edward E. Holland (Democratic) 79.0%; ▌H. H. Humble (Republican) 20.2%; ▌C. E. Good (Unknown) 0.8%
Virginia 3	John Lamb	Democratic	1896	Incumbent re-elected.	▌ ✓ John Lamb (Democratic) 84.8%; ▌W. R. Vawter (Republican) 12.8%; Others: ▌D. D. Harrison (Socialist) 1.4%; ▌T. A. Hollins (Socialist Labor) 1.0%
Virginia 4	Robert Turnbull	Democratic	1910 (special)	Incumbent re-elected.	▌ ✓ Robert Turnbull (Democratic) 100%
Virginia 5	Edward W. Saunders	Democratic	1906 (special)	Incumbent re-elected.	▌ ✓ Edward W. Saunders (Democratic) 50.4%; ▌John M. Parsons (Republican) 49.3%; Others: ▌John B. Anglin (Unknown) 0.2%; ▌Bruce Anderson (Socialist) 0.1%
Virginia 6	Carter Glass	Democratic	1902 (special)	Incumbent re-elected.	▌ ✓ Carter Glass (Democratic) 87.6%; ▌William F. Allison (Republican) 12.4%
Virginia 7	James Hay	Democratic	1896	Incumbent re-elected.	▌ ✓ James Hay (Democratic) 58.0%; ▌John Paul Jr. (Republican) 25.8%; ▌Hugh S. Lupton (Independent) 16.2%
Virginia 8	Charles C. Carlin	Democratic	1907 (special)	Incumbent re-elected.	▌ ✓ Charles C. Carlin (Democratic) 100%
Virginia 9	C. Bascom Slemp	Republican	1907 (special)	Incumbent re-elected.	▌ ✓ C. Bascom Slemp (Republican) 50.3%; ▌Henry C. Stuart (Democratic) 49.6%; ▌John F. Reynolds (Unknown) 0.1%
Virginia 10	Henry D. Flood	Democratic	1900	Incumbent re-elected.	▌ ✓ Henry D. Flood (Democratic) 100%

== Washington ==
District	Incumbent			This race	
District	Member	Party	First elected	Results	Candidates
Washington 1	William E. Humphrey	Republican	1902	Incumbent re-elected.	▌ ✓ William E. Humphrey (Republican) 51.2%; ▌W. W. Black (Democratic) 37.1%; ▌W. W. Smith (Socialist) 9.4%; ▌R. E. Dunlap (Prohibition) 2.3%
Washington 2	W. W. McCredie	Republican	1898	Incumbent lost renomination. Republican hold.	▌ ✓ Stanton Warburton (Republican) 57.5%; ▌Maurice Langhorne (Democratic) 28.9%; ▌Leslie E. Aller (Socialist) 11.2%; ▌W. E. Haycox (Prohibition) 2.3%
Washington 3	Miles Poindexter	Republican	1908	Incumbent retired. Republican hold.	▌ ✓ William La Follette (Republican) 62.1%; ▌Harry D. Merritt (Democratic) 29.7%; ▌David C. Coates (Socialist) 8.2%

== West Virginia ==
District	Incumbent			This race	
District	Member	Party	First elected	Results	Candidates
West Virginia 1	William P. Hubbard	Republican	1906	Incumbent retired. Democratic gain.	▌ ✓ John W. Davis (Democratic) 48.88%; ▌Charles E. Carrigan (Republican) 40.71%; ▌A. L. Bauer (Socialist) 7.77%; ▌Ulysses A. Clayton (Prohibition) 2.64%
West Virginia 2	George C. Sturgiss	Republican	1906	Incumbent lost re-election. Democratic gain.	▌ ✓ William G. Brown Jr. (Democratic) 53.32%; ▌George C. Sturgiss (Republican) 42.08%; ▌W. Scott Garner (Socialist) 2.81%; ▌Robert M. Strickler (Prohibition) 1.79%
West Virginia 3	Joseph H. Gaines	Republican	1900	Incumbent lost re-election. Democratic gain.	▌ ✓ Adam B. Littlepage (Democratic) 47.67%; ▌Joseph H. Gaines (Republican) 44.23%; ▌L. C. Rogers (Socialist) 6.16%; ▌Charles Hill (Prohibition) 1.94%
West Virginia 4	Harry C. Woodyard	Republican	1902	Incumbent lost re-election. Democratic gain.	▌ ✓ John M. Hamilton (Democratic) 51.94%; ▌Harry C. Woodyard (Republican) 45.44%; ▌G. P. Sigler (Prohibition) 1.55%; ▌I. W. Houston (Socialist) 1.07%
West Virginia 5	James A. Hughes	Republican	1900	Incumbent re-elected.	▌ ✓ James A. Hughes (Republican) 52.67%; ▌Rankin Wiley Jr. (Democratic) 47.33%

== Wisconsin ==
Wisconsin elected eleven members of congress on Election Day, November 8, 1910.

District	Incumbent			This race	
District	Member	Party	First elected	Results	Candidates
Wisconsin 1	Henry Allen Cooper	Republican	1892	Incumbent re-elected.	▌ ✓ Henry Allen Cooper (Republican) 57.2%; ▌Calvin Stewart (Democratic) 32.6%; ▌Michael Yabs (Social Dem.) 7.1%; ▌Hans H. Moe (Prohibition) 3.1%
Wisconsin 2	John M. Nelson	Republican	1906^{(special)}	Incumbent re-elected.	▌ ✓ John M. Nelson (Republican) 51.5%; ▌Albert G. Schmedeman (Democratic) 44.4%; ▌Francis S. Cook (Social Dem.) 3.2%; ▌J. Burritt Smith (Prohibition) 0.9%
Wisconsin 3	Arthur W. Kopp	Republican	1908	Incumbent re-elected.	▌ ✓ Arthur W. Kopp (Republican) 56.0%; ▌William Coffland (Democratic) 37.9%; ▌Charles H. Berryman (Prohibition) 3.4%; ▌Jesse C. Stoddard (Social Dem.) 2.7%
Wisconsin 4	William J. Cary	Republican	1906	Incumbent re-elected.	▌ ✓ William J. Cary (Republican) 38.0%; ▌Winfield Gaylord (Social Dem.) 36.6%; ▌William J. Kershaw (Democratic) 25.1%; ▌Charles H. Berryman (Prohibition) 0.2%
Wisconsin 5	William H. Stafford	Republican	1902	Incumbent lost re-nomination. Social Democratic gain.	▌ ✓ Victor L. Berger (Social Dem.) 38.3%; ▌Henry F. Cochems (Republican) 31.7%; ▌Joseph P. Carney (Democratic) 31.7%; ▌Moritz A. Schmoyer (Prohibition) 0.3%
Wisconsin 6	Charles H. Weisse	Democratic	1902	Incumbent retired. Democratic hold.	▌ ✓ Michael E. Burke (Democratic) 51.0%; ▌William Froehlich (Republican) 43.0%; ▌John C. Boll (Social Dem.) 5.5%; ▌George C. Hill (Prohibition) 0.5%
Wisconsin 7	John J. Esch	Republican	1898	Incumbent re-elected.	▌ ✓ John J. Esch (Republican) 63.1%; ▌Paul W. Mahoney (Democratic) 30.2%; ▌John Marquet (Social Dem.) 4.8%; ▌A. A. Merrill (Prohibition) 1.9%
Wisconsin 8	James H. Davidson	Republican	1896	Incumbent re-elected.	▌ ✓ James H. Davidson (Republican) 55.2%; ▌Fred B. Rawson (Democratic) 36.9%; ▌Richard W. Burke (Social Dem.) 6.9%; ▌Charles H. Velte (Prohibition) 0.9%
Wisconsin 9	Gustav Küstermann	Republican	1906	Incumbent lost re-election. Democratic gain.	▌ ✓ Thomas F. Konop (Democratic) 45.6%; ▌Gustav Küstermann (Republican) 45.6%; ▌Thomas J. Oliver (Social Dem.) 6.7%; ▌Alex McEathron (Prohibition) 2.1%
Wisconsin 10	Elmer A. Morse	Republican	1906	Incumbent re-elected.	▌ ✓ Elmer A. Morse (Republican) 54.2%; ▌John F. Lamont (Democratic) 36.8%; ▌Lynn Thompson (Social Dem.) 9.0%
Wisconsin 11	Irvine Lenroot	Republican	1908	Incumbent re-elected.	▌ ✓ Irvine Lenroot (Republican) 88.5%; ▌Henry M. Parks (Social Dem.) 11.4%

== Wyoming ==
District	Incumbent			This race	
District	Member	Party	First elected	Results	Candidates
Wyoming at-large	Frank W. Mondell	Republican	1898	Incumbent re-elected.	▌ ✓ Frank W. Mondell (Republican) 54.71%; ▌William B. Ross (Democratic) 39.48%; ▌J. B. Morgan (Socialist) 5.81%

== Non-voting delegates ==
=== Alaska Territory ===
Alaska Territory elected its non-voting delegate August 9, 1910.

District	Incumbent			This race	
District	Representative	Party	First elected	Results	Candidates
Alaska Territory at-large	James Wickersham	Republican	1908	Incumbent re-elected.	▌ ✓ James Wickersham (Republican); ▌Ed Orr (Republican)

=== Arizona Territory ===
Arizona Territory elected its non-voting delegate sometime in 1910, but did not serve out the complete term as statehood was granted in 1912.

District	Incumbent			This race	
District	Representative	Party	First elected	Results	Candidates
Arizona Territory at-large	Ralph H. Cameron	Republican	1908	Incumbent re-elected.	▌ ✓ Ralph H. Cameron (Republican); [data missing]

=== New Mexico Territory ===
New Mexico Territory elected its non-voting delegate sometime in 1910, but did not serve out the complete term as statehood was granted in 1912.

District	Incumbent			This race	
District	Representative	Party	First elected	Results	Candidates
New Mexico Territory at-large	William Henry Andrews	Republican	1904	Incumbent re-elected.	▌ ✓ William Henry Andrews (Republican); [data missing]

== See also ==
- 1910 United States elections
  - 1910–11 United States Senate elections
- 61st United States Congress
- 62nd United States Congress

== Bibliography ==
- Baker, John D. “The Character of the Congressional Revolution of 1910.” Journal of American History 60#3 (1973), pp. 679–691. online on the revolt against Cannon
- Coletta, Paolo E. The Presidency of William Howard Taft (1973) pp 101–120.
- Dubin, Michael J. (1998). 1788 United States Congressional Elections-1997: The Official Results of the Elections of the 1st Through 105th Congresses. McFarland and Company. ISBN 978-0786402830.
- Gould, Lewis L. The William Howard Taft Presidency (2009) pp 107–120.
- Hechler, Ken. Insurgency; personalities and politics of the Taft era (1964) online
- Martis, Kenneth C. (1989). The Historical Atlas of Political Parties in the United States Congress, 1789-1989. Macmillan Publishing Company. ISBN 978-0029201701.
- Moore, John L., ed. (1994). Congressional Quarterly's Guide to U.S. Elections (Third ed.). Congressional Quarterly Inc. ISBN 978-0871879967.
- Rubin, Ruth Bloch. "Organizing for Insurgency: Intraparty Organization and the Development of the House Insurgency, 1908–1910." Studies in American Political Development 27.2 (2013): 86-110 online.
- Solvick, Stanley D. "William Howard Taft and the Payne-Aldrich Tariff." Mississippi Valley Historical Review 50.3 (1963): 424-442 online.
