= 1909 United States House of Representatives elections =

There were elections in 1909 to the United States House of Representatives:

District	Incumbent			This race	
District	Member / Delegate	Party	First elected	Results	Candidates
Louisiana 2	Robert C. Davey	Democratic	1892; 1894 (retired); 1896	Incumbent member-elect died during previous congress. New member elected March 30, 1909. Democratic hold.	▌ ✓ Samuel L. Gilmore (Democratic); Unopposed
Ohio 21	Theodore E. Burton	Republican	1888; 1890 (lost); 1894	Incumbent member-elect resigned during previous congress. New member elected April 20, 1909. Republican hold.	▌ ✓ James H. Cassidy (Republican) 61.76%; ▌Matthew B. Excell (Democratic) 33.87%; ▌Robert Bandlow (Socialist) 4.37%
Illinois 6	William Lorimer	Republican	1894; 1900 (lost); 1902	Incumbent resigned June 17, 1909, after being elected to the U.S. Senate. New member elected November 23, 1909. Republican hold.	▌ ✓ William Moxley (Republican); ▌Frank C. Wood (Democratic) 32.10%; ▌James A. Jarvis (Socialist) 3.08%; ▌Samuel J. Clark (Prohibition) 2.36%; ▌Willis D. Casey (Independent) 1.36%
Washington 2	Francis W. Cushman	Republican	1898	Incumbent died July 6, 1909. New member elected November 2, 1909. Republican hold.	▌ ✓ W. W. McCredie (Republican) 52.15%; ▌Ernest Lister (Democratic) 38.23%; ▌Emil Herman (Socialist) 5.69%; ▌H. K. Rockhill (Prohibition) 2.54%; ▌Thomas Harlan (Independent) 0.72%; ▌C. M. Carlson (Socialist Labor) 0.68%
Philippines at-large	Pablo Ocampo	Democratic	1907	Term ended November 22, 1909. New delegate elected November 23, 1909. Nacionalista gain.	▌ ✓ Manuel L. Quezon (Nacionalista)
