= Theron E. Catlin =

American politician (1878–1960)

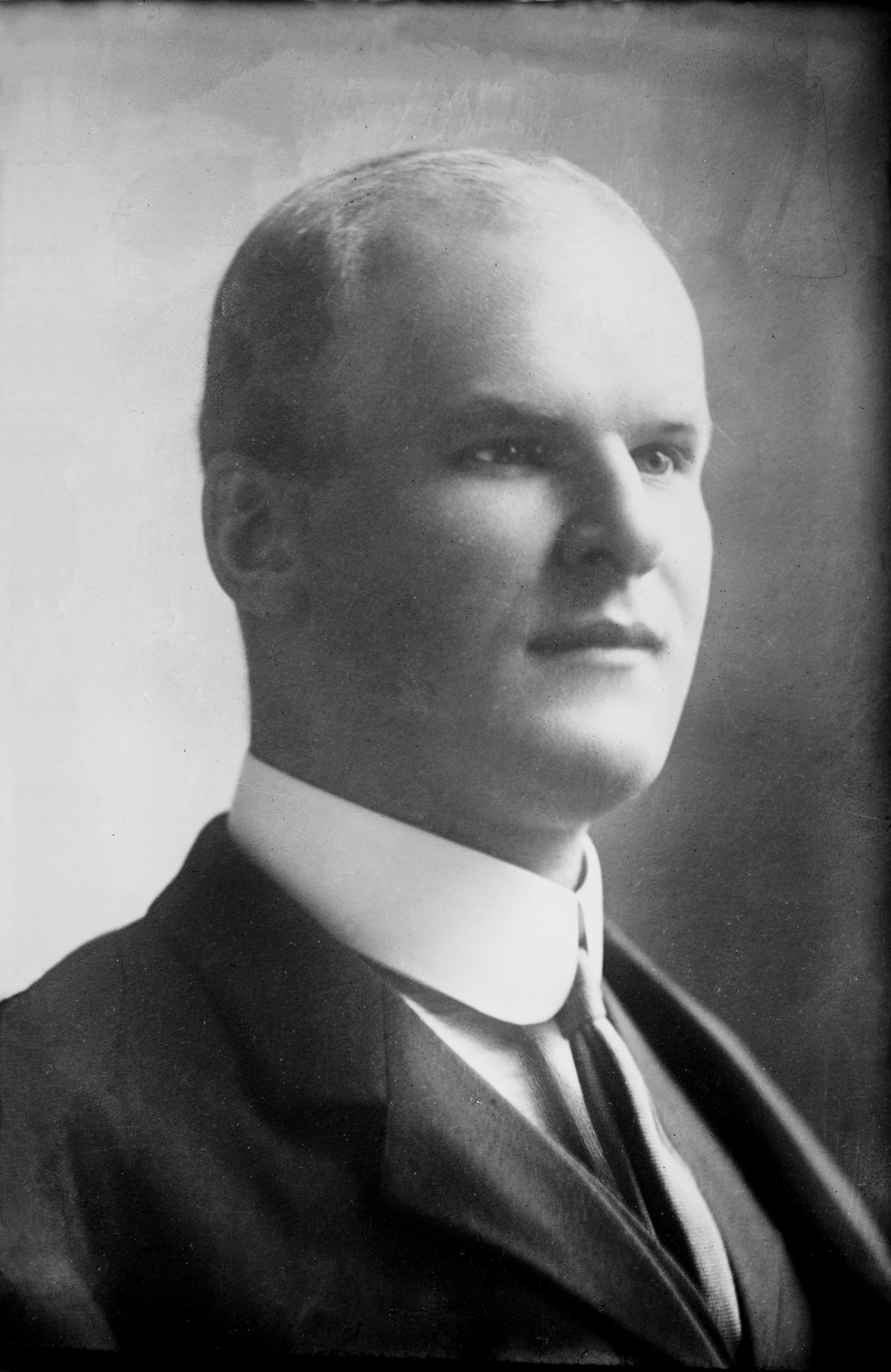

Member of the U.S. House of Representatives from Missouri's 11th district
- In office March 4, 1911 – August 12, 1912
- Preceded by: Patrick F. Gill
- Succeeded by: Patrick F. Gill

Member of the Missouri House of Representatives
- In office 1907–1909

Personal details
- Born: May 16, 1878 St. Louis, Missouri, U.S.
- Died: March 19, 1960 (aged 81) St. Louis, Missouri, U.S.
- Resting place: Bellefontaine Cemetery
- Party: Republican

Theron Ephron Catlin (May 16, 1878 – March 19, 1960) was a U.S. representative from Missouri's 11th congressional district.

Born in St. Louis, Missouri, Catlin attended private schools. He graduated from Harvard University in 1899 and from the law department of the same institution in 1902. He was admitted to the bar in 1903 and commenced practice in St. Louis, Missouri.

He served as a member of the Missouri House of Representatives from 1907–1909.

He presented credentials as a Republican Member-elect to the Sixty-second Congress and served from March 4, 1911, to August 12, 1912. His opponent Patrick F. Gill contested the election on the grounds that Catlin had violated the state's Corrupt Practices Act by allowing family to provide more funding to his election than was allowed. The limit was $662, but more than $10,000 was spent on his campaign. Though he claimed ignorance of the spending, Congress decided he was in violation and he was deemed ineligible for office. They also found evidence of fraud and when the fraudulent votes were eliminated, that Catlin had lost to Gill. Catlin was removed from office and Gill succeeded him.

He was an unsuccessful candidate for election in 1912 to the Sixty-third Congress.

He resumed the practice of law, and served as a member of the board of directors of St. Louis Union Trust Co.

He died in St. Louis, Missouri, March 19, 1960, and his remains were interred in Bellefontaine Cemetery.

U.S. House of Representatives
Preceded by Patrick F. Gill	Member of the U.S. House of Representatives from Missouri's 11th congressional district 1911–1912	Succeeded by Patrick F. Gill
