= Patrick F. Gill =

American politician

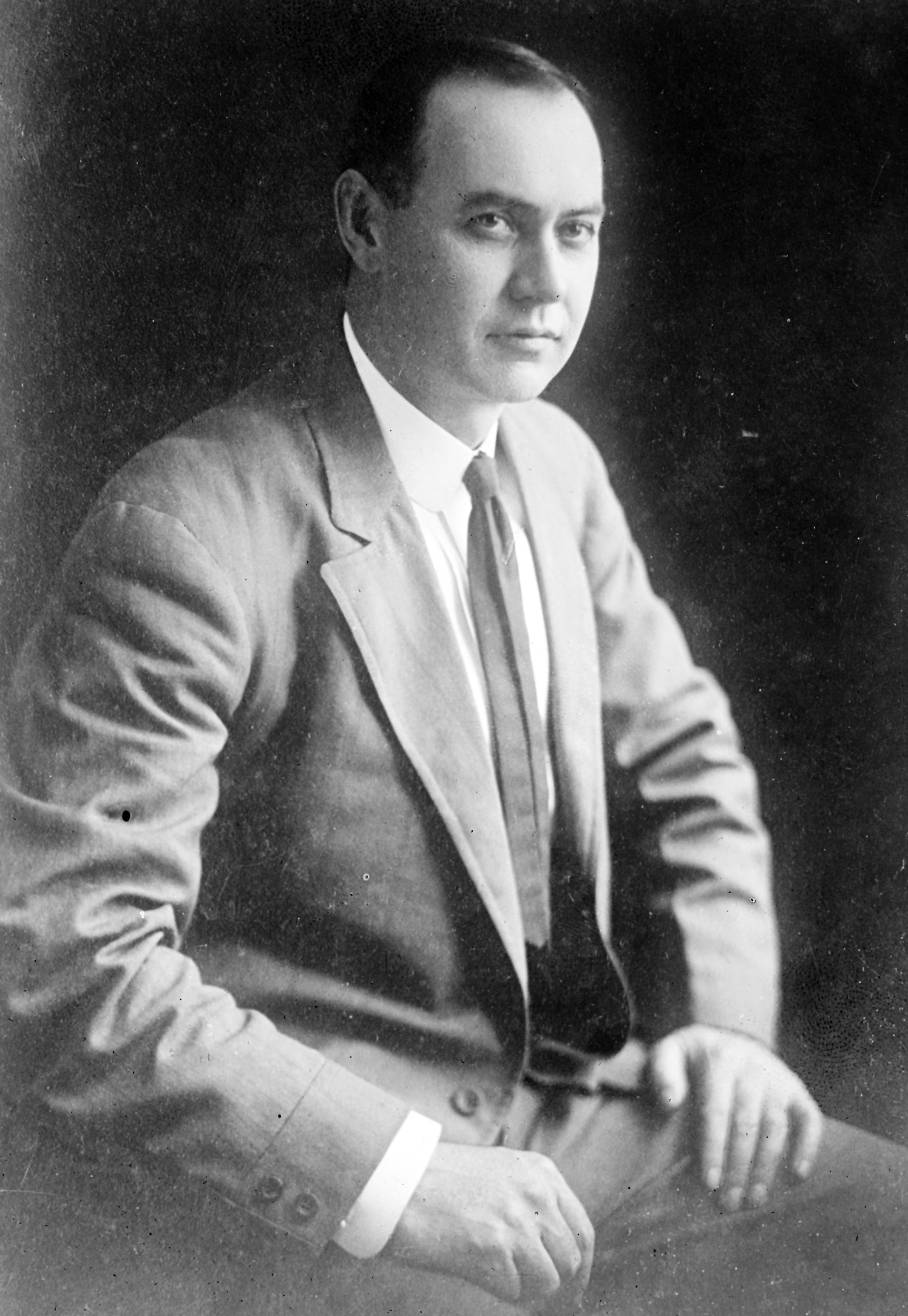

Member of the U.S. House of Representatives from Missouri's 11th district
- In office March 4, 1909 – March 3, 1911
- Preceded by: Henry S. Caulfield
- Succeeded by: Theron E. Catlin
- In office August 12, 1912 – March 3, 1913
- Preceded by: Theron E. Catlin
- Succeeded by: William L. Igoe

Personal details
- Born: August 16, 1868 Independence, Missouri, United States
- Died: May 21, 1923 (aged 54) St. Louis, Missouri, United States
- Party: Democratic
- Profession: Grocer

Patrick Francis Gill (August 16, 1868 – May 21, 1923) was a U.S. Representative from Missouri.

== Pre-congressional life ==
Born in Independence, Missouri, Gill moved with his widowed mother to St. Louis, Missouri, in 1871. He attended the parochial schools and St. Louis University in 1890. He engaged in the grocery business and served as clerk of the circuit court from 1904–1908. He was an unsuccessful candidate for sheriff in 1906.

== Congressional term ==
Gill was elected as a Democrat to the Sixty-first Congress (March 4, 1909 – March 3, 1911). He successfully contested the election of Theron E. Catlin to the Sixty-second Congress and served from August 12, 1912, to March 3, 1913. He was an unsuccessful candidate for renomination. He served as mediator in the Bureau of Mediation and Conciliation, Department of Labor, from July 13, 1918, to September 11, 1922. He died in St. Louis, Missouri, May 21, 1923. He was interred in Calvary Cemetery.

U.S. House of Representatives
Preceded by Henry S. Caulfield	Member of the U.S. House of Representatives from Missouri's 11th congressional district 1909–1911	Succeeded by Theron E. Catlin
Preceded by Theron E. Catlin	Member of the U.S. House of Representatives from Missouri's 11th congressional district 1912–1913	Succeeded by William L. Igoe
