= James H. Cassidy =

American politician

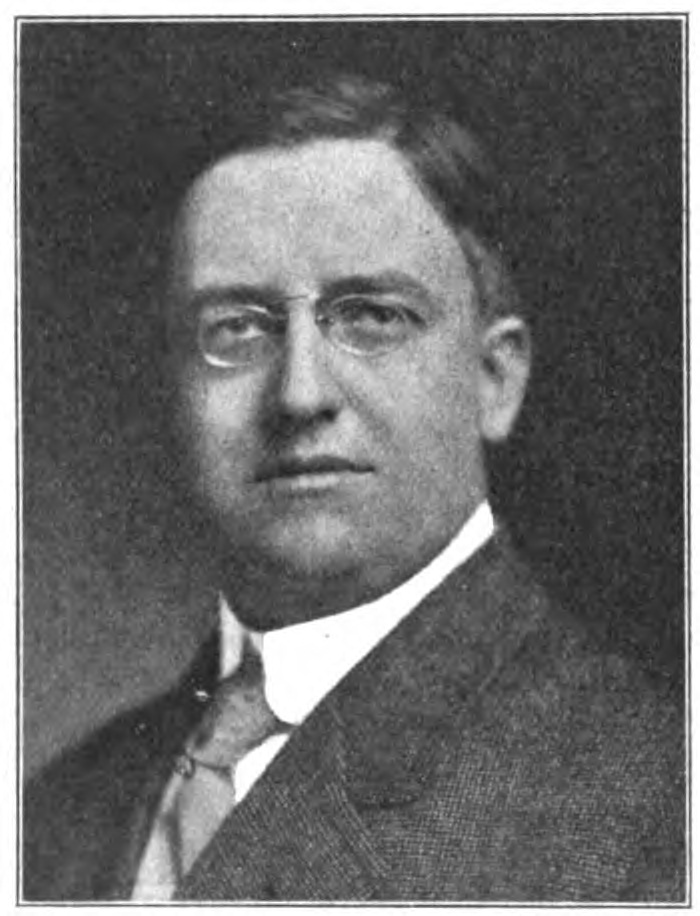

Member of the U.S. House of Representatives from Ohio's 21st district
- In office April 20, 1909 – March 3, 1911
- Preceded by: Theodore E. Burton
- Succeeded by: Robert J. Bulkley

Member of the Ohio House of Representatives
- In office December 1901 - January 11, 1909

Personal details
- Born: James Henry Cassidy; October 28, 1869 Cleveland, Ohio, US
- Died: August 23, 1926 (aged 56) Forest Hills Gardens, New York, US
- Resting place: Maple Grove Cemetery (Kew Gardens, New York)
- Party: Republican
- Education: Cleveland Law School

James Henry Cassidy (October 28, 1869 – August 23, 1926) was an American lawyer and politician who served as a U.S. representative from Ohio for one term from 1909 to 1911.

== Biography ==
Born in Cleveland, Ohio, Cassidy attended public schools. He later studied law at Cleveland Law School.

He was admitted to the bar in 1899 and commenced practice in Cleveland, Ohio. Cassidy subsequently served as clerk of the Committee on Rivers and Harbors, House of Representatives, from December 1901 until January 11, 1909, when he resigned.

=== Congress ===
James H. Cassidy was elected as a Republican to the Sixty-first Congress to fill the vacancy caused by the resignation of Theodore E. Burton, where he served from April 20, 1909 to March 3, 1911. He was an unsuccessful candidate for reelection in 1910 to the Sixty-second Congress.

=== Later career ===
He resumed the practice of his profession in Cleveland, Ohio. He was appointed as receiver of the Cleveland & Pittsburgh Coal Co.. He moved to New York in 1915 and engaged in the brokerage business. He served as president of an express company.

=== Death and burial ===
He died in Forest Hills Gardens, New York on August 23, 1926. He was interred in Maple Grove Cemetery (Kew Gardens, New York).

== Sources ==
- United States Congress. "James H. Cassidy (id: C000238)". Biographical Directory of the United States Congress.

U.S. House of Representatives
Preceded by Theodore E. Burton	Member of the U.S. House of Representatives from Ohio's 21st congressional district 1909-1911	Succeeded by Robert J. Bulkley
