= 1904 United States House of Representatives elections in South Carolina =

The 1904 United States House of Representatives elections in South Carolina were held on November 8, 1904, to elect seven representatives Representatives for one two-year terms from the state of South Carolina. All five incumbents who ran were re-elected and the open seats in the 2nd congressional district and 6th congressional district were retained by the Democrats. The composition of the state delegation thus remained solely Democratic.

== 1st congressional district ==
Incumbent Congressman George Swinton Legaré of the 1st congressional district, in office since 1903, defeated two Republican challengers.

=== General election results ===
South Carolina's 1st congressional district election results, 1904
Party	Candidate	Votes	%	±%
Democratic	George S. Legaré (incumbent)	6,068	91.3	−4.2
Republican	J.N. Noland	346	5.2	N/A
Republican	Aaron P. Prioleau	234	3.5	N/A
Majority		5,722	86.1	−4.9
Turnout		6,648		
Democratic hold				

== 2nd congressional district ==
Incumbent Democratic Congressman Theodore G. Croft of the 2nd congressional district, in office since 1904, did not seek re-election. James O'H. Patterson won the Democratic primary and defeated Republican Isaac Myers in the general election.

=== Democratic primary ===
Democratic primary
Candidate	Votes	%
James O'H. Patterson	5,238	39.7
S.G. Mayfield	5,060	38.4
Leon J. Williams	2,883	21.9

Democratic primary runoff
Candidate	Votes	%	±%
James O'H. Patterson	6,654	54.7	+15.0
S.G. Mayfield	5,520	45.3	+6.9

=== General election results ===
South Carolina's 2nd congressional district election results, 1904
Party	Candidate	Votes	%	±%
Democratic	James O'H. Patterson	7,426	94.7	−0.2
Republican	Isaac Myers	419	5.3	+0.3
Majority		7,007	89.4	−0.5
Turnout		7,845		
Democratic hold				

== 3rd congressional district ==
Incumbent Democratic Congressman Wyatt Aiken of the 3rd congressional district, in office since 1903, defeated I.H. McCalla in the Democratic primary and Republican John Scott in the general election.

=== Democratic primary ===
Democratic primary
Candidate	Votes	%
Wyatt Aiken	11,119	61.7
I.H. McCalla	6,909	38.3

=== General election results ===
South Carolina's 3rd congressional district election results, 1904
Party	Candidate	Votes	%	±%
Democratic	Wyatt Aiken (incumbent)	7,659	98.2	−0.7
Republican	John Scott	142	1.8	+0.7
No party	Write-Ins	1	0.0	0.0
Majority		7,517	96.4	−1.4
Turnout		7,802		
Democratic hold				

== 4th congressional district ==
Incumbent Democratic Congressman Joseph T. Johnson of the 4th congressional district, in office since 1901, defeated Republican challenger J.D. Adams.

=== General election results ===
South Carolina's 4th congressional district election results, 1904
Party	Candidate	Votes	%	±%
Democratic	Joseph T. Johnson (incumbent)	8,516	97.5	−1.2
Republican	J.D. Adams	219	2.5	+1.2
Majority		8,297	95.0	−2.4
Turnout		8,735		
Democratic hold				

== 5th congressional district ==
Incumbent Democratic Congressman David E. Finley of the 5th congressional district, in office since 1899, defeated T. Yancey Williams in the Democratic primary and Republican C.P. White in the general election.

=== Democratic primary ===
Democratic primary
Candidate	Votes	%
David E. Finley	9,823	62.8
T. Yancey Williams	5,809	37.2

=== General election results ===
South Carolina's 5th congressional district election results, 1904
Party	Candidate	Votes	%	±%
Democratic	David E. Finley (incumbent)	7,828	98.5	−0.8
Republican	C.P. White	121	1.5	+0.8
Majority		7,707	97.0	−1.6
Turnout		7,949		
Democratic hold				

== 6th congressional district ==
Incumbent Democratic Congressman Robert B. Scarborough of the 6th congressional district, in office since 1901, opted to retire. J. Edwin Ellerbe, brother of former South Carolina Governor William Haselden Ellerbe, won the Democratic primary and defeated Republican E.H. Deas in the general election.

=== Democratic primary ===
Democratic primary
Candidate	Votes	%
J. Willard Ragsdale	4,923	30.1
J. Edwin Ellerbe	4,808	29.4
James Norton	4,205	25.7
George W. Dargan	2,425	14.8

Democratic primary runoff
Candidate	Votes	%	±%
J. Edwin Ellerbe	7,735	57.4	+28.0
J. Willard Ragsdale	5,730	42.6	+12.5

=== General election results ===
South Carolina's 6th congressional district election results, 1904
Party	Candidate	Votes	%	±%
Democratic	J. Edwin Ellerbe	8,353	95.8	−4.2
Republican	E.H. Deas	370	4.2	+4.2
Majority		7,983	91.6	−8.4
Turnout		8,723		
Democratic hold				

== 7th congressional district ==
Incumbent Democratic Congressman Asbury Francis Lever of the 7th congressional district, in office since 1901, defeated Republican challenger C.C. Jacobs.

=== General election results ===
South Carolina's 7th congressional district election results, 1904
Party	Candidate	Votes	%	±%
Democratic	Asbury F. Lever (incumbent)	8,726	93.8	−2.4
Republican	C.C. Jacobs	563	6.0	+2.2
No party	Write-Ins	16	0.2	+0.2
Majority		8,163	87.8	−4.6
Turnout		9,305		
Democratic hold				

== See also ==
- United States House of Representatives elections, 1904
- South Carolina gubernatorial election, 1904
- South Carolina's congressional districts
