= 1908 United States House of Representatives elections in South Carolina =

The 1908 United States House of Representatives elections in South Carolina were held on November 3, 1908, to select seven Representatives for two-year terms from the state of South Carolina. All seven incumbents were re-elected and the composition of the state delegation remained solely Democratic.

== 1st congressional district ==
Incumbent Democratic Congressman George Swinton Legaré of the 1st congressional district, in office since 1903, defeated Republican challenger Aaron P. Prioleau.

=== General election results ===
South Carolina's 1st congressional district election results, 1908
Party	Candidate	Votes	%	±%
Democratic	George S. Legaré (incumbent)	5,759	90.1	−9.2
Republican	Aaron P. Prioleau	631	9.9	+9.2
Majority		5,128	80.2	−18.4
Turnout		6,390		
Democratic hold				

== 2nd congressional district ==
Incumbent Democratic Congressman James O'H. Patterson of the 2nd congressional district, in office since 1905, defeated W.S. Smith in the Democratic primary and Republican Isaac C. Myers in the general election.

=== Democratic primary ===
Democratic primary
Candidate	Votes	%
James O'H. Patterson	8,875	77.4
W.S. Smith	2,593	22.6

=== General election results ===
South Carolina's 2nd congressional district election results, 1908
Party	Candidate	Votes	%	±%
Democratic	James O'H. Patterson (incumbent)	8,440	99.3	+4.0
Republican	Isaac C. Myers	58	0.7	−4.0
Majority		8,382	98.6	+8.0
Turnout		8,498		
Democratic hold				

== 3rd congressional district ==
Incumbent Democratic Congressman Wyatt Aiken of the 3rd congressional district, in office since 1903, defeated Julius E. Boggs in the Democratic primary and was unopposed in the general election.

=== Democratic primary ===
Democratic primary
Candidate	Votes	%
Wyatt Aiken	5,304	54.0
Julius E. Boggs	4,526	46.0

=== General election results ===
South Carolina's 3rd congressional district election results, 1908
Party	Candidate	Votes	%	±%
Democratic	Wyatt Aiken (incumbent)	10,274	100.0	0.0
Majority		10,274	100.0	0.0
Turnout		10,274		
Democratic hold				

== 4th congressional district ==
Incumbent Democratic Congressman Joseph T. Johnson of the 4th congressional district, in office since 1901, was unopposed in his bid for re-election.

=== General election results ===
South Carolina's 4th congressional district election results, 1908
Party	Candidate	Votes	%	±%
Democratic	Joseph T. Johnson (incumbent)	10,806	100.0	+1.3
Majority		10,806	100.0	+2.2
Turnout		10,806		
Democratic hold				

== 5th congressional district ==
Incumbent Democratic Congressman David E. Finley of the 5th congressional district, in office since 1899, won the Democratic primary and was unopposed in the general election.

=== Democratic primary ===
Democratic primary
Candidate	Votes	%
David E. Finley	6,572	45.4
T. Bothwell Butler	4,333	30.0
William P. Pollock	3,553	24.6

Democratic primary runoff
Candidate	Votes	%	±%
David E. Finley	8,051	58.1	+12.7
T. Bothwell Butler	5,816	41.9	+11.9

=== General election results ===
South Carolina's 5th congressional district election results, 1908
Party	Candidate	Votes	%	±%
Democratic	David E. Finley (incumbent)	9,468	100.0	0.0
Majority		9,468	100.0	0.0
Turnout		9,468		
Democratic hold				

== 6th congressional district ==
Incumbent Democratic Congressman J. Edwin Ellerbe of the 6th congressional district, in office since 1901, won the Democratic primary and was unopposed in the general election.

=== Democratic primary ===
Democratic primary
Candidate	Votes	%
J. Edwin Ellerbe	8,025	45.1
J. Willard Ragsdale	4,091	23.0
P.A. Hodges	2,803	15.8
James R. Coggeshall	1,900	10.7
W. Murchison	964	5.4

Democratic primary runoff
Candidate	Votes	%	±%
J. Edwin Ellerbe	9,608	57.2	+12.1
J. Willard Ragsdale	7,203	42.8	+19.8

=== General election results ===
South Carolina's 6th congressional district election results, 1908
Party	Candidate	Votes	%	±%
Democratic	J. Edwin Ellerbe (incumbent)	9,035	100.0	0.0
Majority		9,035	100.0	0.0
Turnout		9,035		
Democratic hold				

== 7th congressional district ==
Incumbent Democratic Congressman Asbury Francis Lever of the 7th congressional district, in office since 1901, defeated Republican challenger R.H. Richardson.

=== General election results ===
South Carolina's 7th congressional district election results, 1908
Party	Candidate	Votes	%	±%
Democratic	Asbury F. Lever (incumbent)	9,950	90.9	−6.7
Republican	R.H. Richardson	998	9.1	+6.7
Majority		8,952	81.8	−13.4
Turnout		10,948		
Democratic hold				

== See also ==
- United States House of Representatives elections, 1908
- South Carolina gubernatorial election, 1908
- South Carolina's congressional districts
