= 1906 United States House of Representatives elections in South Carolina =

The 1906 United States House of Representatives elections in South Carolina were held on November 6, 1906, to select seven Representatives for two-year terms from the state of South Carolina. All seven incumbents were re-elected and the composition of the state delegation remained solely Democratic.

== 1st congressional district ==
Incumbent Democratic Congressman George Swinton Legaré of the 1st congressional district, in office since 1903, defeated Republican challenger Aaron P. Prioleau.

=== General election results ===
South Carolina's 1st congressional district election results, 1906
Party	Candidate	Votes	%	±%
Democratic	George S. Legaré (incumbent)	3,965	99.3	+8.0
Republican	Aaron P. Prioleau	28	0.7	−8.0
No party	Write-Ins	1	0.0	0.0
Majority		3,937	98.6	+12.5
Turnout		3,994		
Democratic hold				

== 2nd congressional district ==
Incumbent Democratic Congressman James O'H. Patterson of the 2nd congressional district, in office since 1905, won the Democratic primary and defeated Republican Isaac Myers in the general election.

=== Democratic primary ===
Democratic primary
Candidate	Votes	%
James O'H. Patterson	6,370	52.9
Gasper L. Toole	2,845	23.6
Butler B. Hare	2,821	23.5

=== General election results ===
South Carolina's 2nd congressional district election results, 1906
Party	Candidate	Votes	%	±%
Democratic	James O'H. Patterson (incumbent)	4,588	95.3	+0.6
Republican	Isaac Myers	226	4.7	−0.6
Majority		4,362	90.6	+1.2
Turnout		4,814		
Democratic hold				

== 3rd congressional district ==
Incumbent Democratic Congressman Wyatt Aiken of the 3rd congressional district, in office since 1903, defeated Julius E. Boggs in the Democratic primary and was unopposed in the general election.

=== Democratic primary ===
Democratic primary
Candidate	Votes	%
Wyatt Aiken	9,293	57.7
Julius E. Boggs	6,802	42.3

=== General election results ===
South Carolina's 3rd congressional district election results, 1906
Party	Candidate	Votes	%	±%
Democratic	Wyatt Aiken (incumbent)	2,938	100.0	+1.8
Majority		2,938	100.0	+3.6
Turnout		2,938		
Democratic hold				

== 4th congressional district ==
Incumbent Democratic Congressman Joseph T. Johnson of the 4th congressional district, in office since 1901, won the Democratic primary and defeated Republican David C. Gist in the general election.

=== Democratic primary ===
Democratic primary
Candidate	Votes	%
Joseph T. Johnson	12,732	72.0
G. Heyward Mahon	2,805	15.9
W.C. Irby	2,138	12.1

=== General election results ===
South Carolina's 4th congressional district election results, 1906
Party	Candidate	Votes	%	±%
Democratic	Joseph T. Johnson (incumbent)	5,124	98.7	+1.2
Republican	David C. Gist	49	0.9	−1.6
No party	Write-Ins	19	0.4	+0.4
Majority		5,075	97.8	+2.8
Turnout		5,192		
Democratic hold				

== 5th congressional district ==
Incumbent Democratic Congressman David E. Finley of the 5th congressional district, in office since 1899, defeated Thomas J. Strait in the Democratic primary and was unopposed in the general election.

=== Democratic primary ===
Democratic primary
Candidate	Votes	%
David E. Finley	9,703	65.3
Thomas J. Strait	5,159	34.7

=== General election results ===
South Carolina's 5th congressional district election results, 1906
Party	Candidate	Votes	%	±%
Democratic	David E. Finley (incumbent)	3,585	100.0	+1.5
Majority		3,585	100.0	+3.0
Turnout		3,585		
Democratic hold				

== 6th congressional district ==
Incumbent Democratic Congressman J. Edwin Ellerbe of the 6th congressional district, in office since 1905, was unopposed in his bid for re-election.

=== General election results ===
South Carolina's 6th congressional district election results, 1906
Party	Candidate	Votes	%	±%
Democratic	J. Edwin Ellerbe (incumbent)	3,483	100.0	+4.2
Majority		3,483	100.0	+8.4
Turnout		3,483		
Democratic hold				

== 7th congressional district ==
Incumbent Democratic Congressman Asbury Francis Lever of the 7th congressional district, in office since 1901, defeated Republican challenger Aaron D. Dantzler.

=== General election results ===
South Carolina's 7th congressional district election results, 1906
Party	Candidate	Votes	%	±%
Democratic	Asbury F. Lever (incumbent)	5,391	97.6	+3.8
Republican	Aaron D. Dantzler	133	2.4	−3.6
Majority		5,258	95.2	+7.4
Turnout		5,524		
Democratic hold				

== See also ==
- United States House of Representatives elections, 1906
- South Carolina gubernatorial election, 1906
- South Carolina's congressional districts
