= 1910 United States House of Representatives elections in South Carolina =

The 1910 United States House of Representatives elections in South Carolina were held on November 8, 1910, to select seven Representatives for two-year terms from the state of South Carolina. Six incumbents were re-elected and the open seat in the 2nd congressional district was retained by the Democrats. The composition of the state delegation thus remained solely Democratic.

== 1st congressional district ==
Incumbent Democratic Congressman George Swinton Legaré of the 1st congressional district, in office since 1903, defeated James H. Lessesne in the Democratic primary and Republican Aaron P. Prioleau in the general election.

=== Democratic primary ===
Democratic primary
Candidate	Votes	%
George Swinton Legaré	7,111	74.3
James H. Lesesne	2,464	25.7

=== General election results ===
South Carolina's 1st congressional district election results, 1910
Party	Candidate	Votes	%	±%
Democratic	George S. Legaré (incumbent)	3,432	97.4	+7.3
Republican	Aaron P. Prioleau	75	2.1	−7.8
Socialist	William Eberhard	18	0.5	+0.5
Majority		3,357	95.3	+15.1
Turnout		3,525		
Democratic hold				

== 2nd congressional district ==
Incumbent Democratic Congressman James O'H. Patterson of the 2nd congressional district, in office since 1905, was defeated in the Democratic primary by James F. Byrnes. He was unopposed in the general election.

=== Democratic primary ===
Democratic primary
Candidate	Votes	%
James O'H. Patterson	5,391	42.7
James F. Byrnes	4,897	38.7
C.W. Garris	2,355	18.6

Democratic primary runoff
Candidate	Votes	%	±%
James F. Byrnes	6,248	50.2	+11.5
James O'H. Patterson	6,190	49.8	+7.1

=== General election results ===
South Carolina's 2nd congressional district election results, 1910
Party	Candidate	Votes	%	±%
Democratic	James F. Byrnes	4,392	100.0	+0.7
Majority		4,392	100.0	+1.4
Turnout		4,392		
Democratic hold				

== 3rd congressional district ==
Incumbent Democratic Congressman Wyatt Aiken of the 3rd congressional district, in office since 1903, was unopposed in his bid for re-election.

=== General election results ===
South Carolina's 3rd congressional district election results, 1910
Party	Candidate	Votes	%	±%
Democratic	Wyatt Aiken (incumbent)	3,381	99.9	−0.1
No party	Write-Ins	2	0.1	+0.1
Majority		3,379	99.8	−0.2
Turnout		3,383		
Democratic hold				

== 4th congressional district ==
Incumbent Democratic Congressman Joseph T. Johnson of the 4th congressional district, in office since 1901, defeated Republican challenger Thomas Brier.

=== General election results ===
South Carolina's 4th congressional district election results, 1910
Party	Candidate	Votes	%	±%
Democratic	Joseph T. Johnson (incumbent)	7,616	98.9	−1.1
Republican	Thomas Brier	81	1.1	+1.1
No party	Write-Ins	1	0.0	0.0
Majority		7,535	97.8	−2.2
Turnout		7,698		
Democratic hold				

== 5th congressional district ==
Incumbent Democratic Congressman David E. Finley of the 5th congressional district, in office since 1899, won the Democratic primary and was unopposed in the general election.

=== Democratic primary ===
Democratic primary
Candidate	Votes	%
David E. Finley	8,735	52.5
T. Bothwell Butler	6,131	36.9
J.K. Henry	1,769	10.6

=== General election results ===
South Carolina's 5th congressional district election results, 1910
Party	Candidate	Votes	%	±%
Democratic	David E. Finley (incumbent)	3,470	100.0	0.0
Majority		3,470	100.0	0.0
Turnout		3,470		
Democratic hold				

== 6th congressional district ==
Incumbent Democratic Congressman J. Edwin Ellerbe of the 6th congressional district, in office since 1901, won the Democratic primary and was unopposed in the general election.

=== Democratic primary ===
Democratic primary
Candidate	Votes	%
J. Edwin Ellerbe	7,832	47.9
P.A. Hodges	3,781	23.1
George W. Brown	2,621	16.0
Ben B. Sellers	2,133	13.0

Democratic primary runoff
Candidate	Votes	%	±%
J. Edwin Ellerbe	8,916	57.8	+9.9
P.A. Hodges	6,503	42.2	+19.1

=== General election results ===
South Carolina's 6th congressional district election results, 1910
Party	Candidate	Votes	%	±%
Democratic	J. Edwin Ellerbe (incumbent)	3,734	100.0	0.0
Majority		3,734	100.0	0.0
Turnout		3,734		
Democratic hold				

== 7th congressional district ==
Incumbent Democratic Congressman Asbury Francis Lever of the 7th congressional district, in office since 1901, defeated W.W. Roy in the Democratic primary and Republican R.H. Richardson in the general election.

=== Democratic primary ===
Democratic primary
Candidate	Votes	%
Asbury Francis Lever	12,760	85.0
W.W. Roy	2,246	15.0

=== General election results ===
South Carolina's 7th congressional district election results, 1910
Party	Candidate	Votes	%	±%
Democratic	Asbury F. Lever (incumbent)	4,762	95.6	+4.7
Republican	R.H. Richardson	214	4.3	−4.8
No party	Write-Ins	5	0.1	+0.1
Majority		4,548	91.3	+9.5
Turnout		4,981		
Democratic hold				

== See also ==
- United States House of Representatives elections, 1910
- South Carolina gubernatorial election, 1910
- South Carolina's congressional districts
