= 1914 United States House of Representatives elections in South Carolina =

The 1914 United States House of Representatives elections in South Carolina were held on November 3, 1914, to select seven Representatives for two-year terms from the state of South Carolina. The primary elections were held on August 25 and the runoff elections were held two weeks later on September 8. All seven incumbents were re-elected and the composition of the state delegation remained solely Democratic.

== 1st congressional district ==
Incumbent Democratic Congressman Richard S. Whaley of the 1st congressional district, in office since 1913, defeated E.J. Dennis in the Democratic primary and two minor candidates in the general election.

=== Democratic primary ===
Democratic primary
Candidate	Votes	%
Richard S. Whaley	7,081	58.0
E.J. Dennis	5,136	42.0

=== General election results ===
South Carolina's 1st congressional district election results, 1914
Party	Candidate	Votes	%	±%
Democratic	Richard S. Whaley (incumbent)	3,018	98.5	+1.3
Republican	Aaron P. Prioleau	30	1.0	−0.8
Socialist	William Eberhard	15	0.5	−0.5
Majority		2,988	97.5	+2.1
Turnout		3,063		
Democratic hold				

== 2nd congressional district ==
Incumbent Democratic Congressman James F. Byrnes of the 2nd congressional district, in office since 1911, defeated C.M. Mixon in the Democratic primary and was unopposed in the general election.

=== Democratic primary ===
Democratic primary
Candidate	Votes	%
James F. Byrnes	11,620	81.6
C.M. Mixon	2,627	18.4

=== General election results ===
South Carolina's 2nd congressional district election results, 1914
Party	Candidate	Votes	%	±%
Democratic	James F. Byrnes (incumbent)	4,688	100.0	0.0
Majority		4,688	100.0	0.0
Turnout		4,688		
Democratic hold				

== 3rd congressional district ==
Incumbent Democratic Congressman Wyatt Aiken of the 3rd congressional district, in office since 1903, won the Democratic primary and was unopposed in the general election.

=== Democratic primary ===
Democratic primary
Candidate	Votes	%
Wyatt Aiken	11,079	48.7
Frederick H. Dominick	8,170	35.9
John A. Horton	2,648	11.6
F.S. Evans	867	3.8

Democratic primary runoff
Candidate	Votes	%	±%
Wyatt Aiken	11,591	58.6	+9.9
Frederick H. Dominick	8,189	41.4	+5.5

=== General election results ===
South Carolina's 3rd congressional district election results, 1914
Party	Candidate	Votes	%	±%
Democratic	Wyatt Aiken (incumbent)	4,521	100.0	0.0
Majority		4,521	100.0	0.0
Turnout		4,521		
Democratic hold				

== 4th congressional district ==
Incumbent Democratic Congressman Joseph T. Johnson of the 4th congressional district, in office since 1901, won the Democratic primary and defeated two minor candidates in the general election.

=== Democratic primary ===
Democratic primary
Candidate	Votes	%
Joseph T. Johnson	12,378	64.4
Samuel J. Nicholls	5,717	29.8
Thomas C. Duncan	1,113	5.8

=== General election results ===
South Carolina's 4th congressional district election results, 1914
Party	Candidate	Votes	%	±%
Democratic	Joseph T. Johnson (incumbent)	6,175	99.5	−0.5
Republican	J.W. Sexton	22	0.3	+0.3
Socialist	M.I. Ellenberg	11	0.2	+0.2
Majority		6,153	99.2	−0.8
Turnout		6,208		
Democratic hold				

== 5th congressional district ==
Incumbent Democratic Congressman David E. Finley of the 5th congressional district, in office since 1899, defeated W.F. Stevenson in the Democratic primary and was unopposed in the general election.

=== Democratic primary ===
Democratic primary
Candidate	Votes	%
David E. Finley	9,885	54.2
W.F. Stevenson	8,344	45.8

=== General election results ===
South Carolina's 5th congressional district election results, 1914
Party	Candidate	Votes	%	±%
Democratic	David E. Finley (incumbent)	5,180	100.0	0.0
Majority		5,180	100.0	0.0
Turnout		5,180		
Democratic hold				

== 6th congressional district ==
Incumbent Democratic Congressman J. Willard Ragsdale of the 6th congressional district, in office since 1913, won the Democratic primary and was unopposed in the general election.

=== Democratic primary ===
Democratic primary
Candidate	Votes	%
J. Willard Ragsdale	11,077	57.5
J. Edwin Ellerbe	5,933	30.8
A.L. Hamer	2,247	11.7

=== General election results ===
South Carolina's 6th congressional district election results, 1914
Party	Candidate	Votes	%	±%
Democratic	J. Willard Ragsdale (incumbent)	4,263	100.0	0.0
Majority		4,263	100.0	0.0
Turnout		4,263		
Democratic hold				

== 7th congressional district ==
Incumbent Democratic Congressman Asbury Francis Lever of the 7th congressional district, in office since 1901, defeated two minor candidates in the general election.

=== General election results ===
South Carolina's 7th congressional district election results, 1914
Party	Candidate	Votes	%	±%
Democratic	Asbury F. Lever (incumbent)	5,232	95.1	−3.3
Republican	I.S. Leevy	224	4.1	+2.5
Socialist	George F. Lee	45	0.8	+0.8
Majority		5,008	91.0	−5.8
Turnout		5,501		
Democratic hold				

== See also ==
- United States House of Representatives elections, 1914
- South Carolina gubernatorial election, 1914
- South Carolina's congressional districts
