= 59th United States Congress =

1905–1907 U.S. Congress

←	58th	60th	→
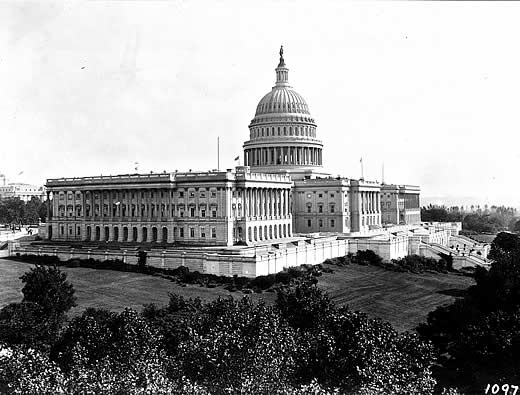
- United States Capitol (1906)

Overview
- Legislative body: United States Congress
- Jurisdiction: United States
- Term: March 4, 1905 – March 4, 1907

Senate
- Members: 90
- President: Charles W. Fairbanks (R)
- President pro tempore: William P. Frye (R)
- Party control: Republican

House of Representatives
- Members: 386 representatives 6 non-voting delegates
- Speaker: Joseph G. Cannon (R)
- Party control: Republican

Sessions
- Special (Note: Special session of the Senate.): March 4, 1905 – March 18, 1905
- 1st: December 4, 1905 – June 30, 1906
- 2nd: December 3, 1906 – March 3, 1907

The 59th United States Congress was a meeting of the legislative branch of the United States federal government, composed of the United States Senate and the United States House of Representatives. It met in Washington, D.C. from March 4, 1905, to March 4, 1907, during the fifth and sixth years of Theodore Roosevelt's presidency. The apportionment of seats in the House of Representatives was based on the 1900 United States census. Both chambers had a Republican majority.

== Major events ==
- March 4, 1905: President Theodore Roosevelt began his second (only full) term.

== Major legislation ==
- May 28, 1906: Foreign Dredge Act of 1906
- June 8, 1906: Antiquities Act
- June 29, 1906: Hepburn Act
- June 30, 1906: Pure Food and Drug Act of 1906 (Wiley Act), ch. 3915, 34 Stat. 768
- June 30, 1906: Meat Inspection Act (Beveridge Act)
- 1906: The Carnegie Foundation for the Advancement of Teaching chartered.
- March 2, 1907: Expatriation Act of 1907, 34 Stat. 1228

== Party summary ==
=== Senate ===
	Party (shading shows control)		Total	Vacant
	Democratic (D)	Republican (R)	Total	Vacant
End of previous congress	33	56	89	1
Begin	32	56	88	2
End	32	58	90	0
Final voting share	35.6%	64.4%		
Beginning of next congress	29	61	90	0

=== House of Representatives ===
	Party (shading shows control)		Total	Vacant
	Democratic (D)	Republican (R)	Total	Vacant
End of previous congress	175	209	384	2
Begin	136	249	385	1
End	133	246	379	7
Final voting share	35.1%	64.9%		
Beginning of next congress	162	221	383	3

== Leaders ==
=== Senate leadership ===
Senate President

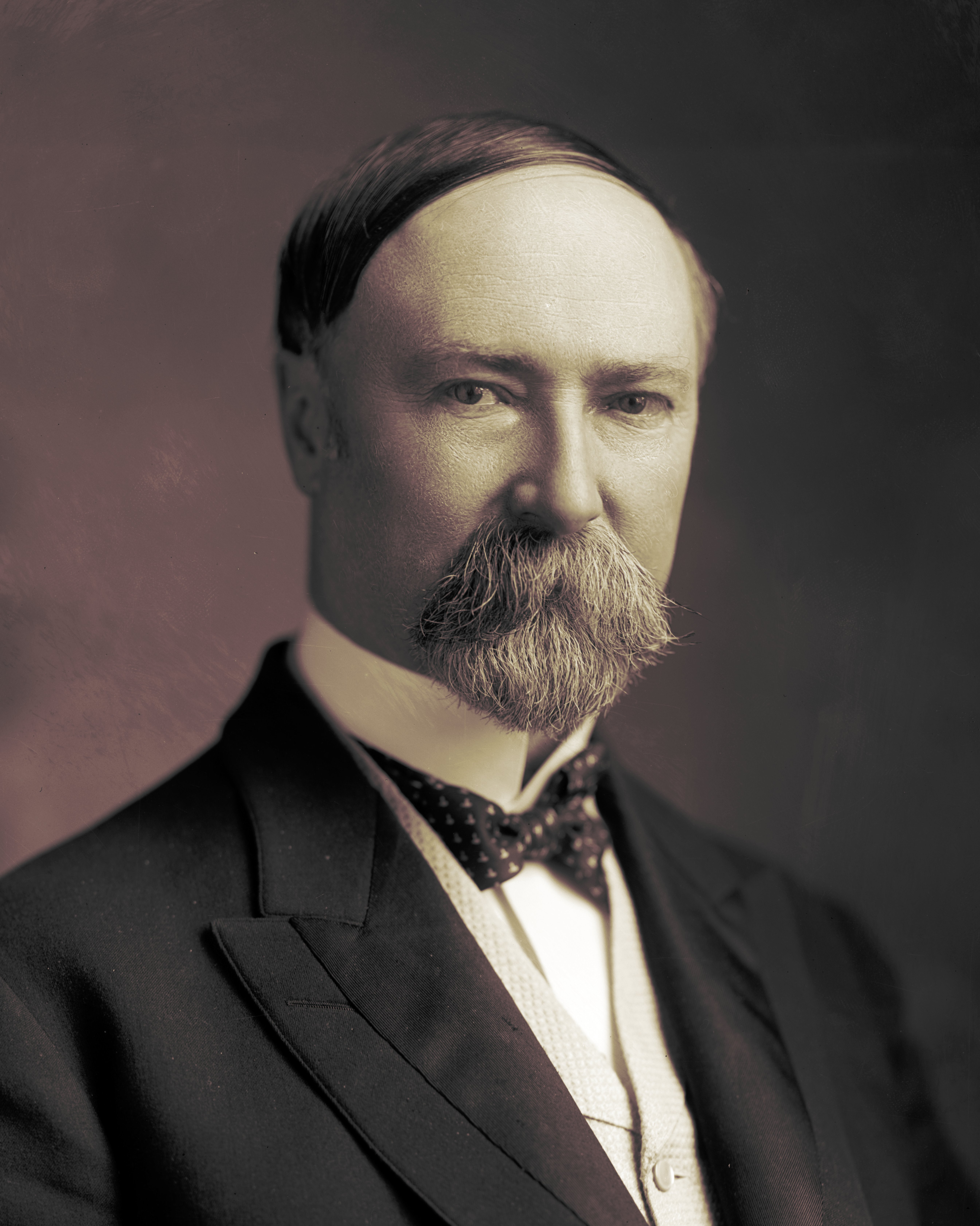
Charles W. Fairbanks (R)

Senate
President pro tempore

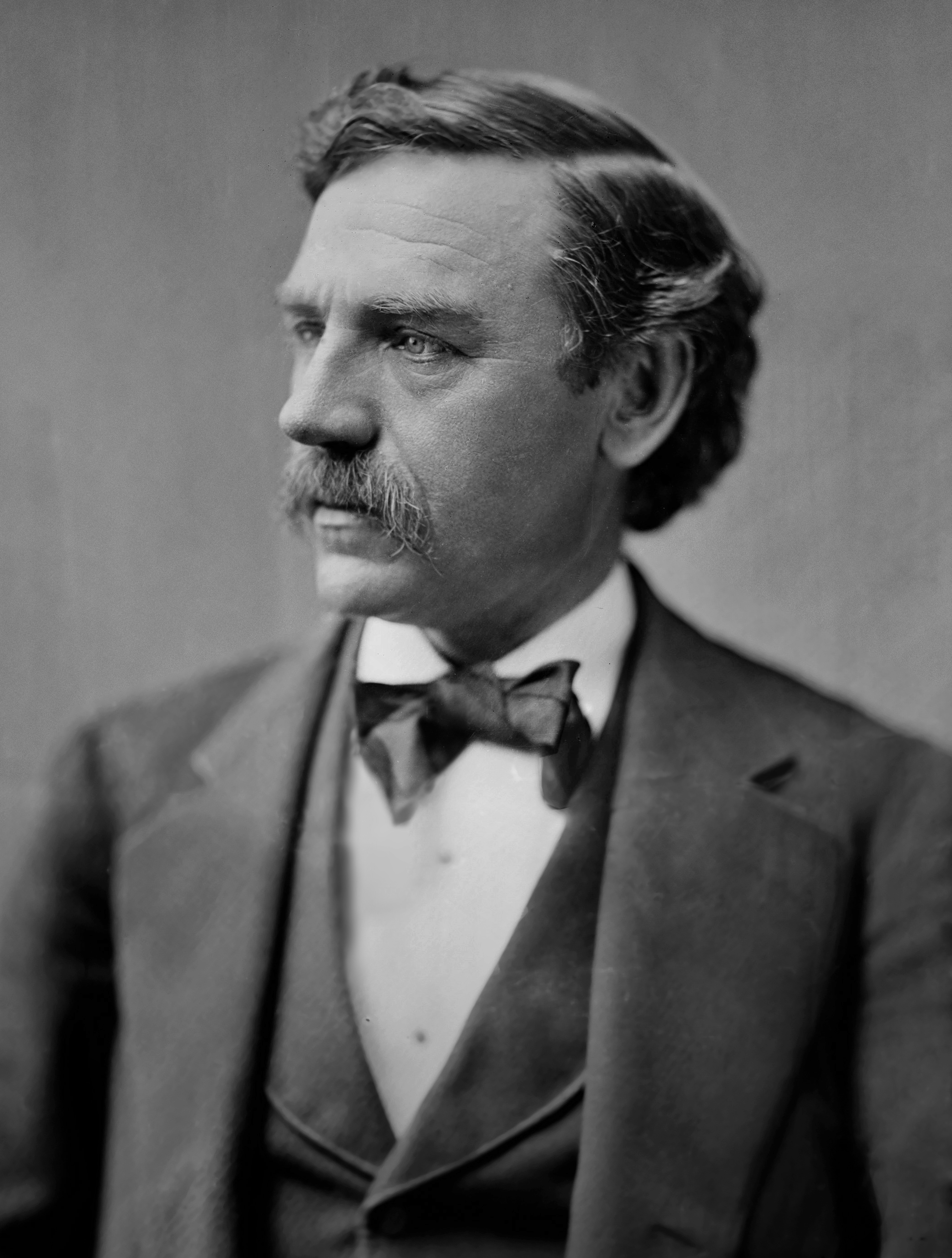
William P. Frye (R)

==== Presiding ====
- President: Charles W. Fairbanks (R)
- President pro tempore: William P. Frye (R)
- Republican Conference Chairman: William B. Allison
- Democratic Caucus Chair: Arthur Pue Gorman, until June 4, 1906
  - Joseph Clay Stiles Blackburn, afterwards
- Democratic Caucus Secretary: Edward W. Carmack

=== House leadership ===
House Speaker

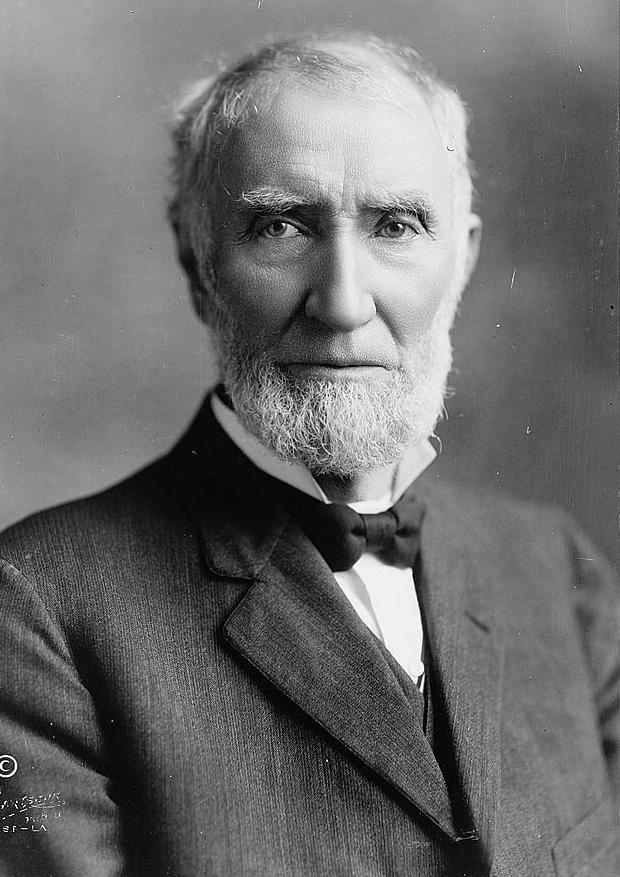
Joseph G. Cannon (R)

==== Presiding ====
- Speaker: Joseph G. Cannon (R)

==== Majority (Republican) leadership ====
- Majority Leader: Sereno E. Payne
- Majority Whip: James E. Watson
- Republican Conference Chair: William Peters Hepburn

==== Minority (Democratic) leadership ====
- Minority Leader: John Sharp Williams
- Minority Whip: James T. Lloyd
- Democratic Caucus Chairman: Robert Lee Henry
- Democratic Campaign Committee Chairman: James M. Griggs

== Members ==
This list is arranged by chamber, then by state. Senators are listed by class, and representatives are listed by district.

Skip to House of Representatives, below

=== Senate ===
At this time, senators were elected by the state legislatures every two years, with one-third beginning new six-year terms with each Congress. Preceding the names in the list below are Senate class numbers, which indicate the cycle of their election, In this Congress, Class 2 meant their term ended with this Congress, requiring reelection in 1906; Class 3 meant their term began in the last Congress, requiring reelection in 1908; and Class 1 meant their term began in this Congress, requiring reelection in 1910.

==== Alabama ====
▌2. John T. Morgan (D)
▌3. Edmund Pettus (D)

==== Arkansas ====
▌2. James H. Berry (D)
▌3. James P. Clarke (D)

==== California ====
▌1. Frank P. Flint (R)
▌3. George C. Perkins (R)

==== Colorado ====
▌2. Thomas M. Patterson (D)
▌3. Henry M. Teller (D)

==== Connecticut ====
▌1. Morgan G. Bulkeley (R)
▌3. Orville H. Platt (R), until April 21, 1905

▌Frank B. Brandegee (R), from May 10, 1905

==== Delaware ====
▌1. Henry A. du Pont, (R), from June 13, 1906
▌2. J. Frank Allee (R)

==== Florida ====
▌2. James P. Taliaferro (D)
▌3. Stephen Mallory (D)

==== Georgia ====
▌2. Augustus O. Bacon (D)
▌3. Alexander S. Clay (D)

==== Idaho ====
▌2. Fred Dubois (D)
▌3. Weldon B. Heyburn (R)

==== Illinois ====
▌2. Shelby M. Cullom (R)
▌3. Albert J. Hopkins (R)

==== Indiana ====
▌1. Albert J. Beveridge (R)
▌3. James A. Hemenway (R)

==== Iowa ====
▌2. Jonathan P. Dolliver (R)
▌3. William B. Allison (R)

==== Kansas ====
▌2. Joseph R. Burton (R), until June 4, 1906

▌Alfred W. Benson (R), June 11, 1906 - January 23, 1907
▌Charles Curtis (R), from January 29, 1907

▌3. Chester I. Long (R)

==== Kentucky ====
▌2. Joseph C. S. Blackburn (D)
▌3. James B. McCreary (D)

==== Louisiana ====
▌2. Murphy J. Foster (D)
▌3. Samuel D. McEnery (D)

==== Maine ====
▌1. Eugene Hale (R)
▌2. William P. Frye (R)

==== Maryland ====
▌1. Isidor Rayner (D)
▌3. Arthur P. Gorman (D), until June 4, 1906

▌William Pinkney Whyte (D), from June 8, 1906

==== Massachusetts ====
▌1. Henry Cabot Lodge (R)
▌2. Winthrop M. Crane (R)

==== Michigan ====
▌1. Julius C. Burrows (R)
▌2. Russell A. Alger (R), until January 24, 1907

▌William Alden Smith (R), from February 6, 1907

==== Minnesota ====
▌1. Moses E. Clapp (R)
▌2. Knute Nelson (R)

==== Mississippi ====
▌1. Hernando D. Money (D)
▌2. Anselm J. McLaurin (D)

==== Missouri ====
▌1. William Warner (R), from March 18, 1905
▌3. William J. Stone (D)

==== Montana ====
▌1. Thomas H. Carter (R)
▌2. William A. Clark (D)

==== Nebraska ====
▌1. Elmer J. Burkett (R)
▌2. Joseph H. Millard (R)

==== Nevada ====
▌1. George S. Nixon (R)
▌3. Francis G. Newlands (D)

==== New Hampshire ====
▌2. Henry E. Burnham (R)
▌3. Jacob H. Gallinger (R)

==== New Jersey ====
▌1. John Kean Jr. (R)
▌2. John F. Dryden (R)

==== New York ====
▌1. Chauncey M. Depew (R)
▌3. Thomas C. Platt (R)

==== North Carolina ====
▌2. Furnifold M. Simmons (D)
▌3. Lee S. Overman (D)

==== North Dakota ====
▌1. Porter J. McCumber (R)
▌3. Henry C. Hansbrough (R)

==== Ohio ====
▌1. Charles W. F. Dick (R)
▌3. Joseph B. Foraker (R)

==== Oregon ====
▌2. John H. Mitchell (R), until December 8, 1905

▌John M. Gearin (D), December 13, 1905 - January 23, 1907
▌Frederick W. Mulkey (R), from January 23, 1907

▌3. Charles W. Fulton (R)

==== Pennsylvania ====
▌1. Philander C. Knox (R)
▌3. Boies Penrose (R)

==== Rhode Island ====
▌1. Nelson W. Aldrich (R)
▌2. George P. Wetmore (R)

==== South Carolina ====
▌2. Benjamin R. Tillman (D)
▌3. Asbury C. Latimer (D)

==== South Dakota ====
▌2. Robert J. Gamble (R)
▌3. Alfred B. Kittredge (R)

==== Tennessee ====
▌1. William B. Bate (D), until March 9, 1905

James B. Frazier (D), from March 21, 1905

▌2. Edward W. Carmack (D)

==== Texas ====
▌1. Charles A. Culberson (D)
▌2. Joseph W. Bailey (D)

==== Utah ====
▌1. George Sutherland (R)
▌3. Reed Smoot (R)

==== Vermont ====
▌1. Redfield Proctor (R)
▌3. William P. Dillingham (R)

==== Virginia ====
▌1. John W. Daniel (D)
▌2. Thomas S. Martin (D)

==== Washington ====
▌1. Samuel H. Piles (R)
▌3. Levi Ankeny (R)

==== West Virginia ====
▌1. Nathan B. Scott (R)
▌2. Stephen B. Elkins (R)

==== Wisconsin ====
▌1. Robert M. La Follette Sr. (R)
▌3. John C. Spooner (R)

==== Wyoming ====
▌1. Clarence D. Clark (R)
▌2. Francis E. Warren (R)

Senators' party membership by state at the opening of the 59th Congress in March 1905. 2 Democrats 1 Democrat and 1 Republican 2 Republicans Territories

=== House of Representatives ===
==== Alabama ====
▌1. George W. Taylor (D)
▌2. Ariosto A. Wiley (D)
▌3. Henry D. Clayton (D)
▌4. Sydney J. Bowie (D)
▌5. J. Thomas Heflin (D)
▌6. John H. Bankhead (D)
▌7. John L. Burnett (D)
▌8. William N. Richardson (D)
▌9. Oscar Underwood (D)

==== Arkansas ====
▌1. Robert B. Macon (D)
▌2. Stephen Brundidge Jr. (D)
▌3. John C. Floyd (D)
▌4. John S. Little (D), until January 14, 1907
▌5. Charles C. Reid (D)
▌6. Joseph Taylor Robinson (D)
▌7. Robert M. Wallace (D)

==== California ====
▌1. James N. Gillett (R), until November 4, 1906

▌William F. Englebright (R), from November 6, 1906

▌2. Duncan E. McKinlay (R)
▌3. Joseph R. Knowland (R)
▌4. Julius Kahn (R)
▌5. Everis A. Hayes (R)
▌6. James C. Needham (R)
▌7. James McLachlan (R)
▌8. Sylvester C. Smith (R)

==== Colorado ====
▌1. Robert W. Bonynge (R)
▌2. Herschel M. Hogg (R)
▌At-large. Franklin E. Brooks (R)

==== Connecticut ====
▌1. E. Stevens Henry (R)
▌2. Nehemiah D. Sperry (R)
▌3. Frank B. Brandegee (R), until May 10, 1905

▌Edwin W. Higgins (R), from October 2, 1905

▌4. Ebenezer J. Hill (R)
▌At-large. George L. Lilley (R)

==== Delaware ====
▌At-large. Hiram R. Burton (R)

==== Florida ====
▌1. Stephen M. Sparkman (D)
▌2. Frank Clark (D)
▌3. William B. Lamar (D)

==== Georgia ====
▌1. Rufus E. Lester (D), until June 16, 1906

▌James W. Overstreet (D), from October 3, 1906

▌2. James M. Griggs (D)
▌3. Elijah B. Lewis (D)
▌4. William C. Adamson (D)
▌5. Leonidas F. Livingston (D)
▌6. Charles L. Bartlett (D)
▌7. Gordon Lee (D)
▌8. William M. Howard (D)
▌9. Thomas Montgomery Bell (D)
▌10. Thomas W. Hardwick (D)
▌11. William G. Brantley (D)

==== Idaho ====
▌At-large. Burton L. French (R)

==== Illinois ====
▌1. Martin B. Madden (R)
▌2. James R. Mann (R)
▌3. William W. Wilson (R)
▌4. Charles S. Wharton (R)
▌5. Anthony Michalek (R)
▌6. William Lorimer (R)
▌7. Philip Knopf (R)
▌8. Charles McGavin (R)
▌9. Henry S. Boutell (R)
▌10. George E. Foss (R)
▌11. Howard M. Snapp (R)
▌12. Charles Eugene Fuller (R)
▌13. Robert R. Hitt (R), until September 20, 1906

▌Frank O. Lowden (R), from November 6, 1906

▌14. Benjamin F. Marsh (R), until June 2, 1905

▌James McKinney (R), from November 7, 1905

▌15. George W. Prince (R)
▌16. Joseph V. Graff (R)
▌17. John A. Sterling (R)
▌18. Joseph G. Cannon (R)
▌19. William B. McKinley (R)
▌20. Henry T. Rainey (D)
▌21. Zeno J. Rives (R)
▌22. William A. Rodenberg (R)
▌23. Frank S. Dickson (R)
▌24. Pleasant T. Chapman (R)
▌25. George Washington Smith (R)

==== Indiana ====
▌1. John H. Foster (R), from May 16, 1905
▌2. John C. Chaney (R)
▌3. William T. Zenor (D)
▌4. Lincoln Dixon (D)
▌5. Elias S. Holliday (R)
▌6. James E. Watson (R)
▌7. Jesse Overstreet (R)
▌8. George W. Cromer (R)
▌9. Charles B. Landis (R)
▌10. Edgar D. Crumpacker (R)
▌11. Frederick Landis (R)
▌12. Newton W. Gilbert (R), until November 6, 1906

▌Clarence C. Gilhams (R), from November 6, 1906

▌13. Abraham L. Brick (R)

==== Iowa ====
▌1. Thomas Hedge (R)
▌2. Albert F. Dawson (R)
▌3. Benjamin P. Birdsall (R)
▌4. Gilbert N. Haugen (R)
▌5. Robert G. Cousins (R)
▌6. John F. Lacey (R)
▌7. John A. T. Hull (R)
▌8. William P. Hepburn (R)
▌9. Walter I. Smith (R)
▌10. James P. Conner (R)
▌11. Elbert H. Hubbard (R)

==== Kansas ====
▌1. Charles Curtis (R), until January 28, 1907
▌2. Justin De Witt Bowersock (R)
▌3. Philip P. Campbell (R)
▌4. James Monroe Miller (R)
▌5. William A. Calderhead (R)
▌6. William A. Reeder (R)
▌7. Victor Murdock (R)
▌At-large. Charles Frederick Scott (R)

==== Kentucky ====
▌1. Ollie M. James (D)
▌2. Augustus Stanley (D)
▌3. James M. Richardson (D)
▌4. David Highbaugh Smith (D)
▌5. J. Swagar Sherley (D)
▌6. Joseph L. Rhinock (D)
▌7. South Trimble (D)
▌8. George G. Gilbert (D)
▌9. Joseph B. Bennett (R)
▌10. Francis A. Hopkins (D)
▌11. Don C. Edwards (R)

==== Louisiana ====
▌1. Adolph Meyer (D)
▌2. Robert C. Davey (D)
▌3. Robert F. Broussard (D)
▌4. John Thomas Watkins (D)
▌5. Joseph E. Ransdell (D)
▌6. Samuel M. Robertson (D)
▌7. Arsène Paulin Pujó (D)

==== Maine ====
▌1. Amos L. Allen (R)
▌2. Charles E. Littlefield (R)
▌3. Edwin C. Burleigh (R)
▌4. Llewellyn Powers (R)

==== Maryland ====
▌1. Thomas A. Smith (D)
▌2. J. Frederick C. Talbott (D)
▌3. Frank C. Wachter (R)
▌4. John Gill Jr. (D)
▌5. Sydney E. Mudd (R)
▌6. George A. Pearre (R)

==== Massachusetts ====
▌1. George P. Lawrence (R)
▌2. Frederick H. Gillett (R)
▌3. Rockwood Hoar (R), until November 1, 1906

▌Charles G. Washburn (R), from December 18, 1906

▌4. Charles Q. Tirrell (R)
▌5. Butler Ames (R)
▌6. Augustus P. Gardner (R)
▌7. Ernest W. Roberts (R)
▌8. Samuel W. McCall (R)
▌9. John A. Keliher (D)
▌10. William S. McNary (D)
▌11. John Andrew Sullivan (D)
▌12. John W. Weeks (R)
▌13. William S. Greene (R)
▌14. William C. Lovering (R)

==== Michigan ====
▌1. Edwin C. Denby (R)
▌2. Charles E. Townsend (R)
▌3. Washington Gardner (R)
▌4. Edward L. Hamilton (R)
▌5. William Alden Smith (R), until February 9, 1907
▌6. Samuel W. Smith (R)
▌7. Henry McMorran (R)
▌8. Joseph W. Fordney (R)
▌9. Roswell P. Bishop (R)
▌10. George A. Loud (R)
▌11. Archibald B. Darragh (R)
▌12. H. Olin Young (R)

==== Minnesota ====
▌1. James Albertus Tawney (R)
▌2. James T. McCleary (R)
▌3. Charles Russell Davis (R)
▌4. Frederick C. Stevens (R)
▌5. Loren Fletcher (R)
▌6. Clarence Buckman (R)
▌7. Andrew Volstead (R)
▌8. James Bede (R)
▌9. Halvor Steenerson (R)

==== Mississippi ====
▌1. Ezekiel S. Candler Jr. (D)
▌2. Thomas Spight (D)
▌3. Benjamin G. Humphreys II (D)
▌4. Wilson S. Hill (D)
▌5. Adam M. Byrd (D)
▌6. Eaton J. Bowers (D)
▌7. Frank A. McLain (D)
▌8. John Sharp Williams (D)

==== Missouri ====
▌1. James T. Lloyd (D)
▌2. William W. Rucker (D)
▌3. Frank B. Klepper (R)
▌4. Frank B. Fulkerson (R)
▌5. Edgar C. Ellis (R)
▌6. David A. De Armond (D)
▌7. John Welborn (R)
▌8. Dorsey W. Shackleford (D)
▌9. James Beauchamp Clark (D)
▌10. Richard Bartholdt (R)
▌11. John T. Hunt (D)
▌12. Ernest E. Wood (D), until June 23, 1906

▌Harry M. Coudrey (R), from June 23, 1906

▌13. Marion E. Rhodes (R)
▌14. William T. Tyndall (R)
▌15. Cassius M. Shartel (R)
▌16. Arthur P. Murphy (R)

==== Montana ====
▌At-large. Joseph M. Dixon (R)

==== Nebraska ====
▌1. Elmer J. Burkett (R), until March 4, 1905

▌Ernest M. Pollard (R), from July 18, 1905

▌2. John L. Kennedy (R)
▌3. John J. McCarthy (R)
▌4. Edmund H. Hinshaw (R)
▌5. George W. Norris (R)
▌6. Moses P. Kinkaid (R)

==== Nevada ====
▌At-large. Clarence D. Van Duzer (D)

==== New Hampshire ====
▌1. Cyrus A. Sulloway (R)
▌2. Frank Dunklee Currier (R)

==== New Jersey ====
▌1. Henry C. Loudenslager (R)
▌2. John J. Gardner (R)
▌3. Benjamin F. Howell (R)
▌4. Ira W. Wood (R)
▌5. Charles N. Fowler (R)
▌6. Henry C. Allen (R)
▌7. Richard Wayne Parker (R)
▌8. William H. Wiley (R)
▌9. Marshall Van Winkle (R)
▌10. Allan L. McDermott (D)

==== New York ====
▌1. William W. Cocks (R)
▌2. George H. Lindsay (D)
▌3. Charles T. Dunwell (R)
▌4. Charles B. Law (R)
▌5. George E. Waldo (R)
▌6. William M. Calder (R)
▌7. John J. Fitzgerald (D)
▌8. Timothy D. Sullivan (D), until July 27, 1906

▌Daniel J. Riordan (D), from November 6, 1906

▌9. Henry M. Goldfogle (D)
▌10. William Sulzer (D)
▌11. William Randolph Hearst (D)
▌12. W. Bourke Cockran (D)
▌13. Herbert Parsons (R)
▌14. Charles A. Towne (D)
▌15. J. Van Vechten Olcott (R)
▌16. Jacob Ruppert (D)
▌17. William S. Bennet (R)
▌18. Joseph A. Goulden (D)
▌19. John E. Andrus (R)
▌20. Thomas W. Bradley (R)
▌21. John H. Ketcham (R), until November 4, 1906
▌22. William H. Draper (R)
▌23. George N. Southwick (R)
▌24. Frank J. LeFevre (R)
▌25. Lucius N. Littauer (R)
▌26. William H. Flack (R), until February 2, 1907
▌27. James S. Sherman (R)
▌28. Charles L. Knapp (R)
▌29. Michael E. Driscoll (R)
▌30. John W. Dwight (R)
▌31. Sereno E. Payne (R)
▌32. James B. Perkins (R)
▌33. J. Sloat Fassett (R)
▌34. James W. Wadsworth (R)
▌35. William H. Ryan (D)
▌36. De Alva S. Alexander (R)
▌37. Edward B. Vreeland (R)

==== North Carolina ====
▌1. John Humphrey Small (D)
▌2. Claude Kitchin (D)
▌3. Charles R. Thomas (D)
▌4. Edward W. Pou (D)
▌5. William W. Kitchin (D)
▌6. Gilbert B. Patterson (D)
▌7. Robert N. Page (D)
▌8. E. Spencer Blackburn (R)
▌9. Edwin Y. Webb (D)
▌10. James M. Gudger Jr. (D)

==== North Dakota ====
▌At-large. Thomas Frank Marshall (R)
▌At-large. Asle Gronna (R)

==== Ohio ====
▌1. Nicholas Longworth (R)
▌2. Herman P. Goebel (R)
▌3. Robert M. Nevin (R)
▌4. Harvey C. Garber (D)
▌5. William Wildman Campbell (R)
▌6. Thomas E. Scroggy (R)
▌7. J. Warren Keifer (R)
▌8. Ralph D. Cole (R)
▌9. James H. Southard (R)
▌10. Henry T. Bannon (R)
▌11. Charles H. Grosvenor (R)
▌12. Edward L. Taylor Jr. (R)
▌13. Grant E. Mouser (R)
▌14. Amos R. Webber (R)
▌15. Beman G. Dawes (R)
▌16. Capell L. Weems (R)
▌17. Martin L. Smyser (R)
▌18. James Kennedy (R)
▌19. W. Aubrey Thomas (R)
▌20. Jacob A. Beidler (R)
▌21. Theodore E. Burton (R)

==== Oregon ====
▌1. Binger Hermann (R)
▌2. John N. Williamson (R)

==== Pennsylvania ====
▌1. Henry H. Bingham (R)
▌2. Robert Adams Jr. (R), until June 1, 1906

▌John E. Reyburn (R), from November 6, 1906

▌3. George A. Castor (R), until February 19, 1906

▌J. Hampton Moore (R), from November 6, 1906

▌4. Reuben O. Moon (R)
▌5. Edward D. Morrell (R)
▌6. George D. McCreary (R)
▌7. Thomas S. Butler (R)
▌8. Irving P. Wanger (R)
▌9. Henry B. Cassel (R)
▌10. Thomas H. Dale (R)
▌11. Henry W. Palmer (R)
▌12. George R. Patterson (R), until March 21, 1906

▌Charles N. Brumm (R), from November 6, 1906

▌13. Marcus C. L. Kline (D)
▌14. Mial E. Lilley (R)
▌15. Elias Deemer (R)
▌16. Edmund W. Samuel (R)
▌17. Thaddeus M. Mahon (R)
▌18. Marlin E. Olmsted (R)
▌19. John M. Reynolds (R)
▌20. Daniel F. Lafean (R)
▌21. Solomon R. Dresser (R)
▌22. George F. Huff (R)
▌23. Allen F. Cooper (R)
▌24. Ernest F. Acheson (R)
▌25. Arthur L. Bates (R)
▌26. Gustav A. Schneebeli (R)
▌27. William O. Smith (R)
▌28. Joseph C. Sibley (R)
▌29. William H. Graham (R)
▌30. John Dalzell (R)
▌31. James F. Burke (R)
▌32. Andrew J. Barchfeld (R)

==== Rhode Island ====
▌1. Daniel L. D. Granger (D)
▌2. Adin B. Capron (R)

==== South Carolina ====
▌1. George S. Legare (D)
▌2. James O. Patterson (D)
▌3. Wyatt Aiken (D)
▌4. Joseph T. Johnson (D)
▌5. David E. Finley (D)
▌6. J. Edwin Ellerbe (D)
▌7. Asbury F. Lever (D)

==== South Dakota ====
▌At-large. Charles H. Burke (R)
▌At-large. Eben W. Martin (R)

==== Tennessee ====
▌1. Walter P. Brownlow (R)
▌2. Nathan W. Hale (R)
▌3. John A. Moon (D)
▌4. Mounce G. Butler (D)
▌5. William C. Houston (D)
▌6. John W. Gaines (D)
▌7. Lemuel P. Padgett (D)
▌8. Thetus W. Sims (D)
▌9. Finis J. Garrett (D)
▌10. Malcolm R. Patterson (D), until November 5, 1906

==== Texas ====
▌1. Morris Sheppard (D)
▌2. Moses L. Broocks (D)
▌3. Gordon J. Russell (D)
▌4. Choice B. Randell (D)
▌5. James Andrew Beall (D)
▌6. Scott Field (D)
▌7. Alexander W. Gregg (D)
▌8. John M. Pinckney (D), until April 24, 1905

▌John M. Moore (D), from June 6, 1905

▌9. George Farmer Burgess (D)
▌10. Albert S. Burleson (D)
▌11. Robert L. Henry (D)
▌12. Oscar W. Gillespie (D)
▌13. John H. Stephens (D)
▌14. James L. Slayden (D)
▌15. John Nance Garner (D)
▌16. William R. Smith (D)

==== Utah ====
▌At-large. Joseph Howell (R)

==== Vermont ====
▌1. David J. Foster (R)
▌2. Kittredge Haskins (R)

==== Virginia ====
▌1. William A. Jones (D)
▌2. Harry L. Maynard (D)
▌3. John Lamb (D)
▌4. Robert G. Southall (D)
▌5. Claude A. Swanson (D), until January 30, 1906

▌Edward W. Saunders (D), from November 6, 1906

▌6. Carter Glass (D)
▌7. James Hay (D)
▌8. John F. Rixey (D), until February 8, 1907
▌9. Campbell Slemp (R)
▌10. Henry D. Flood (D)

==== Washington ====
▌At-large. Wesley L. Jones (R)
▌At-large. Francis W. Cushman (R)
▌At-large. William E. Humphrey (R)

==== West Virginia ====
▌1. Blackburn B. Dovener (R)
▌2. Alston G. Dayton (R), until March 16, 1905

▌Thomas B. Davis (D), from June 6, 1905

▌3. Joseph Holt Gaines (R)
▌4. Harry C. Woodyard (R)
▌5. James Anthony Hughes (R)

==== Wisconsin ====
▌1. Henry Allen Cooper (R)
▌2. Henry C. Adams (R), until July 9, 1906

▌John M. Nelson (R), from September 4, 1906

▌3. Joseph W. Babcock (R)
▌4. Theobald Otjen (R)
▌5. William H. Stafford (R)
▌6. Charles H. Weisse (D)
▌7. John J. Esch (R)
▌8. James H. Davidson (R)
▌9. Edward S. Minor (R)
▌10. Webster E. Brown (R)
▌11. John J. Jenkins (R)

==== Wyoming ====
▌At-large. Franklin W. Mondell (R)

==== Non-voting members ====
▌Alaska Territory. Frank Hinman Waskey (D), from August 14, 1906
▌Arizona Territory. Marcus A. Smith (D)
▌Hawaii Territory. Jonah Kūhiō Kalanianaʻole (R)
▌New Mexico Territory. William Henry Andrews (R)
▌Oklahoma Territory. Bird S. McGuire (R)
▌Puerto Rico. Tulio Larrínaga (Resident Commissioner), (Unionist)

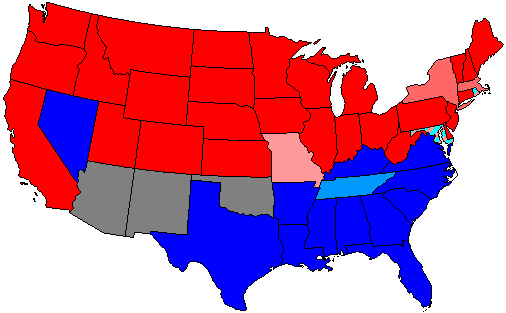
House seats by party holding plurality in state: 80+% – 100% Democratic / 80+% – 100% Republican; 60+% – 80% Democratic / 60+% – 80% Republican; Up to 60% Democratic / Up to 60% Republican

== Changes in membership ==
The count below reflects changes from the beginning of the first session of this Congress.

=== Senate ===
- Replacements: 8
  - Democratic: no net change
  - Republican: no net change
- Deaths: 5
- Resignations: 1
- Vacancies: 2
- Total seats with changes: 9

State (class)	Vacated by	Reason for vacancy	Subsequent	Date of successor's installation
Missouri (1)	Vacant	Legislature had elected late.	William Warner (R)	March 18, 1905
Delaware (1)	Vacant	Legislature had elected late.	Henry A. du Pont (R)	June 13, 1906
Tennessee (1)	William B. Bate (D)	Died March 9, 1905. Successor was elected.	James B. Frazier (D)	March 21, 1905
Connecticut (3)	Orville H. Platt (R)	Died April 21, 1905. Successor was appointed and subsequently elected.	Frank B. Brandegee (R)	May 10, 1905
Oregon (2)	John H. Mitchell (R)	Died December 8, 1905. Successor was appointed.	John M. Gearin (D)	December 13, 1905
Kansas (2)	Joseph R. Burton (R)	Resigned June 4, 1906, due to a conviction of corruption charges. Successor was appointed.	Alfred W. Benson (R)	June 11, 1906
Maryland (2)	Arthur P. Gorman (D)	Died June 4, 1906. Successor was appointed.	William P. Whyte (D)	June 8, 1906
Oregon (2)	John M. Gearin (D)	Successor was elected.	Frederick W. Mulkey (R)	January 23, 1907
Michigan (2)	Russell A. Alger (R)	Died January 24, 1907. Successor was elected.	William A. Smith (R)	February 6, 1907
Kansas (2)	Alfred W. Benson (R)	Successor was elected.	Charles Curtis (R)	January 29, 1907

=== House of Representatives ===
- Replacements: 17
  - Democratic: no net change
  - Republican: no net change
- Deaths: 12
- Resignations: 11
- Contested elections: 1
- New seats: 1
- Total seats with changes: 26

District	Previous	Reason for change	Subsequent	Date of successor's installation
Indiana 1st	Vacant	Rep. James A. Hemenway resigned during previous congress	John H. Foster (R)	May 16, 1905
Nebraska 1st	Elmer Burkett (R)	Resigned March 4, 1905, after being elected to the U.S. Senate	Ernest M. Pollard (R)	July 18, 1905
West Virginia 2nd	Alston G. Dayton (R)	Resigned March 16, 1905, after being appointed judge for the United States District Court for the Northern District of West Virginia	Thomas B. Davis (D)	June 6, 1905
Texas 8th	John M. Pinckney (D)	Assassinated April 24, 1905	John M. Moore (D)	June 6, 1905
Connecticut 3rd	Frank B. Brandegee (R)	Resigned May 10, 1905, after being elected to the U.S. Senate	Edwin W. Higgins (R)	October 2, 1905
Illinois 14th	Benjamin F. Marsh (R)	Died June 2, 1905	James McKinney (R)	November 7, 1905
California 1st	James Gillett (R)	Resigned January 4, 1906, after being elected Governor of California	William F. Englebright (R)	November 6, 1906
Virginia 5th	Claude A. Swanson (D)	Resigned January 30, 1906, after being elected Governor of Virginia	Edward W. Saunders (D)	November 6, 1906
Pennsylvania 3rd	George A. Castor (R)	Died February 19, 1906	J. Hampton Moore (R)	November 6, 1906
Pennsylvania 12th	George R. Patterson (R)	Died March 21, 1906	Charles N. Brumm (R)	November 6, 1906
Pennsylvania 2nd	Robert Adams Jr. (R)	Died June 1, 1906	John E. Reyburn (R)	November 6, 1906
Georgia 1st	Rufus E. Lester (D)	Died June 16, 1906	James W. Overstreet (D)	October 3, 1906
Missouri 12th	Ernest E. Wood (D)	Lost contested election June 23, 1906	Harry M. Coudrey (R)	June 23, 1906
District of Alaska	New seat	New delegate seat August 14, 1906	Frank H. Waskey (D)	August 14, 1906
Wisconsin 2nd	Henry C. Adams (R)	Died July 9, 1906	John M. Nelson (R)	September 4, 1906
New York 8th	Timothy Sullivan (D)	Resigned July 27, 1906	Daniel J. Riordan (D)	November 6, 1906
Illinois 13th	Robert R. Hitt (R)	Died September 20, 1906	Frank O. Lowden (R)	November 6, 1906
Massachusetts 3rd	Rockwood Hoar (R)	Died November 1, 1906	Charles G. Washburn (R)	December 18, 1906
New York 21st	John H. Ketcham (R)	Died November 4, 1906	Seat remained vacant until next Congress	
Tennessee 10th	Malcolm R. Patterson (D)	Resigned November 5, 1906, after being elected Governor of Tennessee	Seat remained vacant until next Congress	
Indiana 12th	Newton W. Gilbert (R)	Resigned November 6, 1906, after being appointed judge of the court of first instance at Manila, Philippines	Clarence C. Gilhams (R)	November 6, 1906
Arkansas 4th	John S. Little (D)	Resigned January 14, 1907, after being elected Governor of Arkansas	Seat remained vacant until next Congress	
Kansas 1st	Charles Curtis (R)	Resigned January 28, 1907, after being elected to the U.S. Senate	Seat remained vacant until next Congress	
New York 26th	William H. Flack (R)	Died February 2, 1907	Seat remained vacant until next Congress	
Virginia 8th	John F. Rixey (D)	Died February 8, 1907	Seat remained vacant until next Congress	
Michigan 5th	William Alden Smith (R)	Resigned February 9, 1907, after being elected to the U.S. Senate	Seat remained vacant until next Congress	

== Committees ==
Lists of committees and their party leaders for members of the House and Senate committees can be found through the Official Congressional Directory at the bottom of this article. The directory after the pages of terms of service lists committees of the Senate, House (Standing with Subcommittees, Select and Special) and Joint and, after that, House/Senate committee assignments. On the committees section of the House and Senate in the Official Congressional Directory, the committee's members on the first row on the left side shows the chairman of the committee and on the right side shows the ranking member of the committee.

=== Senate ===
- Additional Accommodations for the Library of Congress (Select) (Chairman: Thomas S. Martin)
- Agriculture and Forestry (Chairman: Redfield Proctor; Ranking Member: Chester I. Long)
- Appropriations (Chairman: William B. Allison; Ranking Member: Henry M. Teller)
- Audit and Control the Contingent Expenses of the Senate (Chairman: John Kean; Ranking Member: Hernando D. Money)
- Canadian Relations (Chairman: Winthrop Murray Crane; Ranking Member: Benjamin R. Tillman)
- Census (Chairman: Chester I. Long; Ranking Member: Samuel D. McEnery)
- Civil Service and Retrenchment (Chairman: George C. Perkins; Ranking Member: Fred T. Dubois)
- Claims (Chairman: Charles W. Fulton; Ranking Member: Thomas S. Martin)
- Coast and Insular Survey (Chairman: Samuel H. Piles; Ranking Member: John T. Morgan)
- Coast Defenses (Chairman: Philander C. Knox; Ranking Member: Charles A. Culberson)
- Commerce (Chairman: William P. Frye; Ranking Member: James H. Berry)
- Corporations Organized in the District of Columbia (Chairman: Samuel D. McEnery; Ranking Member: Nelson W. Aldrich)
- Cuban Relations (Chairman: Henry E. Burnham; Ranking Member: Henry M. Teller)
- Distributing Public Revenue Among the States (Select)
- District of Columbia (Chairman: Jacob H. Gallinger; Ranking Member: Thomas S. Martin)
- Education and Labor (Chairman: Jonathan P. Dolliver; Ranking Member: John W. Daniel)
- Engrossed Bills (Chairman: James H. Berry; Ranking Member: Alfred B. Kittredge)
- Enrolled Bills (Chairman: John F. Dryden; Ranking Member: Murphy J. Foster Jr.)
- Establish a University in the United States (Select) (Chairman: James A. Hemenway; Ranking Member: Charles A. Culberson)
- Examination of Disposition of Documents (Select) (Chairman: Edmund W. Pettus)
- Examine the Several Branches in the Civil Service (Chairman: Morgan G. Bulkeley; Ranking Member: Charles A. Culberson)
- Expenditures in Executive Departments
- Finance (Chairman: Nelson W. Aldrich; Ranking Member: John W. Daniel)
- Fisheries (Chairman: Albert J. Hopkins; Ranking Member: Stephen R. Mallory)
- Five Civilized Tribes of Indians (Select) (Chairman: Benjamin R. Tillman; Ranking Member: John T. Morgan)
- Foreign Relations (Chairman: Shelby M. Cullom; Ranking Member: John T. Morgan)
- Forest Reservations and the Protection of Game (Chairman: Frank B. Brandegee; Ranking Member: John T. Morgan)
- Geological Survey (Chairman: Frank P. Flint; Ranking Member: Hernando D. Money)
- Immigration (Chairman: William P. Dillingham; Ranking Member: Anselm J. McLaurin)
- Indian Affairs (Chairman: Moses E. Clapp; Ranking Member: John T. Morgan)
- Indian Depredations (Chairman: Elmer J. Burkett; Ranking Member: Augustus O. Bacon)
- Industrial Expositions (Chairman: William Warner; Ranking Member: John W. Daniel)
- Investigate the Condition of the Potomac River Front at Washington (Select) (Chairman: Joseph H. Millard; Ranking Member: Thomas S. Martin)
- Indian Territory (Select)
- Interoceanic Canals (Chairman: Joseph H. Millard; Ranking Member: John T. Morgan)
- Interstate Commerce (Chairman: Stephen B. Elkins; Ranking Member: Benjamin R. Tillman)
- Irrigation and Reclamation of Arid Lands (Chairman: Levi Ankeny; Ranking Member: Clarence D. Van Duzer)
- Judiciary (Chairman: Clarence D. Clark; Ranking Member: Joseph W. Bailey)
- Library (Chairman: George P. Wetmore; Ranking Member: William A. Clark)
- Manufactures (Chairman: Weldon B. Heyburn; Ranking Member: Alexander S. Clay)
- Military Affairs (Chairman: Francis E. Warren; Ranking Member: Edmund W. Pettus)
- Mines and Mining (Chairman: Charles Dick; Ranking Member: Benjamin R. Tillman)
- Mississippi River and its Tributaries (Select) (Chairman: Knute Nelson)
- National Banks (Select) (Chairman: George S. Nixon; Ranking Member: Samuel D. McEnery)
- Naval Affairs (Chairman: Eugene Hale; Ranking Member: Benjamin R. Tillman)
- Organization, Conduct and Expenditures of the Executive Departments (Chairman: Thomas H. Carter; Ranking Member: Anselm J. McLaurin)
- Pacific Islands and Puerto Rico (Chairman: Joseph B. Foraker; Ranking Member: Stephen R. Mallory)
- Pacific Railroads (Chairman: Russell A. Alger; Ranking Member: John T. Morgan)
- Patents (Chairman: Alfred B. Kittredge; Ranking Member: Stephen R. Mallory)
- Pensions (Chairman: Porter J. McCumber; Ranking Member: James P. Taliaferro)
- Philippines (Chairman: Henry Cabot Lodge; Ranking Member: Charles A. Culberson)
- Post Office and Post Roads (Chairman: Boies Penrose; Ranking Member: Arthur P. Gorman)
- Potomac River Front (Select)
- Printing (Chairman: Thomas C. Platt; Ranking Member: Arthur P. Gorman)
- Private Land Claims (Chairman: Henry M. Teller; Ranking Member: Eugene Hale)
- Privileges and Elections (Chairman: Julius C. Burrows; Ranking Member: Edmund W. Pettus)
- Public Buildings and Grounds (Chairman: Nathan B. Scott; Ranking Member: Charles A. Culberson)
- Public Health and National Quarantine (Chairman: John Tyler Morgan; Ranking Member: John Coit Spooner)
- Public Lands (Chairman: Henry C. Hansbrough; Ranking Member: James H. Berry)
- Railroads (Chairman: J. Frank Allee; Ranking Member: Augustus O. Bacon)
- Revision of the Laws (Chairman: Chauncey M. Depew; Ranking Member: John W. Daniel)
- Revolutionary Claims (Chairman: Alexander S. Clay; Ranking Member: Russell A. Alger)
- Rules (Chairman: John C. Spooner; Ranking Member: Henry M. Teller)
- Standards, Weights and Measures (Select) (Chairman: Reed Smoot; Ranking Member: William A. Clark)
- Tariff Regulation (Select)
- Territories (Chairman: Albert J. Beveridge; Ranking Member: Thomas M. Patterson)
- Transportation and Sale of Meat Products (Select) (Chairman: John W. Daniel; Ranking Member: Clarence D. Clark)
- Transportation Routes to the Seaboard (Chairman: Robert J. Gamble; Ranking Member: Edmund W. Pettus)
- Trespassers upon Indian Lands (Select) (Chairman: George Sutherland)
- Ventilation and Acoustics (Select) (Chairman: Roswell P. Bishop; Ranking Member: David H. Smith)
- Whole
- Woman Suffrage (Select) (Chairman: Augustus O. Bacon; Ranking Member: George P. Wetmore)

=== House of Representatives ===
- Accounts (Chairman: H. Burd Cassel; Ranking Member: Charles Lafayette Bartlett)
- Agriculture (Chairman: James W. Wadsworth; Ranking Member: John Lamb)
- Alcoholic Liquor Traffic (Chairman: Nehemiah D. Sperry; Ranking Member: John L. Burnett)
- Appropriations (Chairman: James A. Tawney; Ranking Member: Leonidas F. Livingston)
- Banking and Currency (Chairman: Charles N. Fowler; Ranking Member: Elijah B. Lewis)
- Census (Chairman: Edgar D. Crumpacker; Ranking Member: James Hay)
- Claims (Chairman: James M. Miller; Ranking Member: Henry M. Goldfogle)
- Coinage, Weights and Measures (Chairman: James H. Southard; Ranking Member: John W. Gaines)
- Disposition of Executive Papers
- District of Columbia (Chairman: Joseph W. Babcock; Ranking Member: Thetus W. Sims)
- Education (Chairman: George N. Southwick; Ranking Member: Edwin Y. Webb)
- Election of the President, Vice President and Representatives in Congress (Chairman: Joseph H. Gaines; Ranking Member: William W. Rucker)
- Elections No.#1 (Chairman: James Robert Mann; Ranking Member: Ollie M. James)
- Elections No.#2 (Chairman: Marlin E. Olmsted; Ranking Member: Joshua Frederick Cockey Talbott)
- Elections No.#3 (Chairman: Michael E. Driscoll; Ranking Member: Choice B. Randell)
- Enrolled Bills (Chairman: Frank C. Wachter; Ranking Member: James T. Lloyd)
- Expenditures in the Agriculture Department (Chairman: Charles E. Littlefield; Ranking Member: Henry D. Flood)
- Expenditures in the Commerce and Labor Departments (Chairman: David J. Foster; Ranking Member: Arsene P. Pujo)
- Expenditures in the Interior Department (Chairman: Edward S. Minor; Ranking Member: Robert N. Page)
- Expenditures in the Justice Department (Chairman: William A. Calderhead; Ranking Member: Robert N. Page)
- Expenditures in the Navy Department (Chairman: Joseph W. Fordney; Ranking Member: Choice B. Randell)
- Expenditures in the Post Office Department (Chairman: Irving P. Wanger; Ranking Member: Carter Glass)
- Expenditures in the State Department (Chairman: John H. Ketcham; Ranking Member: Rufus E. Lester)
- Expenditures in the Treasury Department (Chairman: Robert G. Cousins; Ranking Member: John Lamb)
- Expenditures in the War Department (Chairman: George P. Lawrence; Ranking Member: George F. Burgess)
- Expenditures on Public Buildings (Chairman: James A. Hughes; Ranking Member: John H. Small)
- Foreign Affairs (Chairman: Robert R. Hitt; Ranking Member: William M. Howard)
- Immigration and Naturalization (Chairman: Benjamin F. Howell; Ranking Member: Jacob Ruppert Jr.)
- Indian Affairs (Chairman: James S. Sherman; Ranking Member: John H. Stephens)
- Industrial Arts and Expositions (Chairman: Augustus P. Gardner; Ranking Member: Charles L. Bartlett)
- Insular Affairs (Chairman: Henry Allen Cooper; Ranking Member: William A. Jones)
- Interstate and Foreign Commerce (Chairman: William P. Hepburn; Ranking Member: Robert C. Davey)
- Invalid Pensions (Chairman: Cyrus A. Sulloway; Ranking Member: George H. Lindsay)
- Irrigation of Arid Lands (Chairman: Frank W. Mondell; Ranking Member: Clarence D. Van Duzer)
- Judiciary (Chairman: John J. Jenkins; Ranking Member: David A. De Armond)
- Labor (Chairman: John J. Gardner; Ranking Member: William Randolph Hearst)
- Levees and Improvements of the Mississippi River (Chairman: George W. Prince; Ranking Member: Robert F. Broussard)
- Library (Chairman: James T. McCleary; Ranking Member: William M. Howard)
- Manufactures (Chairman: Joseph C. Sibley; Ranking Member: Charles H. Weisse)
- Merchant Marine and Fisheries (Chairman: Charles H. Grosvenor; Ranking Member: Thomas Spight)
- Mileage (Chairman: William A. Reeder; Ranking Member: Elijah B. Lewis)
- Military Affairs (Chairman: John A.T. Hull; Ranking Member: William Sulzer)
- Militia (Chairman: Edward De V. Morrell; Ranking Member: Augustus O. Stanley)
- Mines and Mining (Chairman: Webster E. Brown; Ranking Member: Adolph Meyer)
- Naval Affairs (Chairman: George E. Foss; Ranking Member: Adolph Meyer)
- Pacific Railroads (Chairman: Thomas S. Butler; Ranking Member: James L. Slayden)
- Patents (Chairman: Frank D. Currier; Ranking Member: William Sulzer)
- Pensions (Chairman: Henry C. Loudenslager; Ranking Member: William Richardson)
- Post Office and Post Roads (Chairman: Jesse Overstreet; Ranking Member: John A. Moon)
- Printing (Chairman: Charles B. Landis; Ranking Member: James M. Griggs)
- Private Land Claims (Chairman: George W. Smith; Ranking Member: William A. Jones)
- Public Buildings and Grounds (Chairman: Richard Bartholdt; Ranking Member: John H. Bankhead)
- Public Lands (Chairman: John F. Lacey; Ranking Member: John L. Burnett)
- Railways and Canals (Chairman: James H. Davidson; Ranking Member: John L. Burnett)
- Reform in the Civil Service (Chairman: Frederick H. Gillett; Ranking Member: Edward W. Pou)
- Revision of Laws (Chairman: Reuben O. Moon; Ranking Member: Robert B. Macon)
- Rivers and Harbors (Chairman: Theodore E. Burton; Ranking Member: Rufus E. Lester)
- Rules (Chairman: John Dalzell; Ranking Member: John S. Williams)
- Standards of Official Conduct
- Territories (Chairman: Edward L. Hamilton; Ranking Member: John A. Moon)
- Ventilation and Acoustics (Chairman: Roswell P. Bishop; Ranking Member: David H. Smith)
- War Claims (Chairman: Thaddeus M. Mahon; Ranking Member: Thetus W. Sims)
- Ways and Means (Chairman: Sereno E. Payne; Ranking Member: John S. Williams)
- Whole

=== Joint committees ===
- Conditions of Indian Tribes (Special)
- Disposition of (Useless) Executive Papers (Chairman: Rep. Arthur L. Bates; Vice Chairman: Sen. )
- Revision of the Laws
- The Library
- Printing
- Second Class Mail Matter

== Caucuses ==
- Democratic (House)
- Democratic (Senate)

== Employees ==
=== Legislative branch agency directors ===
- Architect of the Capitol: Elliott Woods
- Librarian of Congress: Herbert Putnam
- Public Printer of the United States: Francis W. Palmer, until 1905
  - Charles A. Stillings, from 1905

=== Senate ===
- Secretary: Charles G. Bennett
- Librarian: Edward C. Goodwin
- Sergeant at Arms: Daniel M. Ransdell
- Chaplain: The Rev. Edward E. Hale, Unitarian

=== House of Representatives ===
- Clerk: Alexander McDowell
- Sergeant at Arms: Henry Casson
- Doorkeeper: Frank B. Lyon
- Postmaster: Joseph C. McElroy
- Clerk at the Speaker's Table: Asher C. Hinds
- Reading Clerks: E. L. Lampson (D) and Dennis E. Alward (R)
- Chaplain: The Rev. Henry N. Couden, Universalist

== See also ==
- 1904 United States elections (elections leading to this Congress)
  - 1904 United States presidential election
  - 1904–05 United States Senate elections
  - 1904 United States House of Representatives elections
- 1906 United States elections (elections during this Congress, leading to the next Congress)
  - 1906–07 United States Senate elections
  - 1906 United States House of Representatives elections
