= 1912 United States House of Representatives elections in South Carolina =

The 1912 United States House of Representatives elections in South Carolina were held on November 5, 1912, to select seven Representatives for two-year terms from the state of South Carolina. Six incumbents were re-elected, but J. Edwin Ellerbe of the 6th congressional district was defeated in the Democratic primary. The seat was retained by the Democrats and the composition of the state delegation remained solely Democratic.

== 1st congressional district ==
Incumbent Democratic Congressman George Swinton Legaré of the 1st congressional district, in office since 1903, defeated L.L. Larisey in the Democratic primary and two minor candidates in the general election.

=== Democratic primary ===
Democratic primary
Candidate	Votes	%
George Swinton Legaré	9,111	69.3
L.L. Larisey	4,045	30.7

=== General election results ===
South Carolina's 1st congressional district election results, 1912
Party	Candidate	Votes	%	±%
Democratic	George S. Legaré (incumbent)	4,550	97.2	−0.2
Republican	Aaron P. Prioleau	85	1.8	−0.3
Socialist	William Eberhard	48	1.0	+0.5
Majority		4,465	95.4	+0.1
Turnout		4,683		
Democratic hold				

== 2nd congressional district ==
Incumbent Democratic Congressman James F. Byrnes of the 2nd congressional district, in office since 1911, defeated Harry D. Calhoun in the Democratic primary and was unopposed in the general election.

=== Democratic primary ===
Democratic primary
Candidate	Votes	%
James F. Byrnes	10,547	70.9
Harry D. Calhoun	4,320	29.1

=== General election results ===
South Carolina's 2nd congressional district election results, 1912
Party	Candidate	Votes	%	±%
Democratic	James F. Byrnes (incumbent)	6,033	100.0	0.0
Majority		6,033	100.0	0.0
Turnout		6,033		
Democratic hold				

== 3rd congressional district ==
Incumbent Democratic Congressman Wyatt Aiken of the 3rd congressional district, in office since 1903, won the Democratic primary and was unopposed in the general election.

=== Democratic primary ===
Democratic primary
Candidate	Votes	%
Wyatt Aiken	16,205	70.7
F.S. Evans	5,305	23.2
M.E. Long	1,402	6.1

=== General election results ===
South Carolina's 3rd congressional district election results, 1912
Party	Candidate	Votes	%	±%
Democratic	Wyatt Aiken (incumbent)	7,458	100.0	+0.1
No party	Write-Ins	1	0.0	−0.1
Majority		7,457	100.0	+0.2
Turnout		7,459		
Democratic hold				

== 4th congressional district ==
Incumbent Democratic Congressman Joseph T. Johnson of the 4th congressional district, in office since 1901, was unopposed in his bid for re-election.

=== General election results ===
South Carolina's 4th congressional district election results, 1912
Party	Candidate	Votes	%	±%
Democratic	Joseph T. Johnson (incumbent)	7,244	100.0	+1.1
Majority		7,244	100.0	+2.2
Turnout		7,244		
Democratic hold				

== 5th congressional district ==
Incumbent Democratic Congressman David E. Finley of the 5th congressional district, in office since 1899, won the Democratic primary and was unopposed in the general election.

=== Democratic primary ===
Democratic primary
Candidate	Votes	%
David E. Finley	12,364	62.7
William P. Pollock	4,315	21.9
Glenn W. Ragsdale	3,038	15.4

=== General election results ===
South Carolina's 5th congressional district election results, 1912
Party	Candidate	Votes	%	±%
Democratic	David E. Finley (incumbent)	7,901	100.0	0.0
Majority		7,901	100.0	0.0
Turnout		7,901		
Democratic hold				

== 6th congressional district ==
Incumbent Democratic Congressman J. Edwin Ellerbe of the 6th congressional district, in office since 1901, was defeated in the Democratic primary by J. Willard Ragsdale. He was unopposed in the general election.

=== Democratic primary ===
Democratic primary
Candidate	Votes	%
J. Willard Ragsdale	11,321	53.0
J. Edwin Ellerbe	10,059	47.0

=== General election results ===
South Carolina's 6th congressional district election results, 1912
Party	Candidate	Votes	%	±%
Democratic	J. Willard Ragsdale	6,446	100.0	0.0
No party	Write-Ins	1	0.0	0.0
Majority		6,445	100.0	0.0
Turnout		6,447		
Democratic hold				

== 7th congressional district ==
Incumbent Democratic Congressman Asbury Francis Lever of the 7th congressional district, in office since 1901, defeated Republican challenger A.D. Dantzler.

=== General election results ===
South Carolina's 7th congressional district election results, 1912
Party	Candidate	Votes	%	±%
Democratic	Asbury F. Lever (incumbent)	6,660	98.4	+2.8
Republican	A.D. Dantzler	105	1.6	−2.7
Majority		6,555	96.8	+5.5
Turnout		6,765		
Democratic hold				

== See also ==
- United States House of Representatives elections, 1912
- South Carolina gubernatorial election, 1912
- South Carolina's congressional districts
