= 1916 United States House of Representatives elections in South Carolina =

The 1916 United States House of Representatives elections in South Carolina were held on November 7, 1916, to select seven representatives for two-year terms from the state of South Carolina. The primary elections were held on August 29, and the runoff elections were held two weeks later on September 12. Six incumbents were re-elected, but Wyatt Aiken of the 3rd congressional district was defeated in the Democratic primary. The seat was retained by the Democrats, and the composition of the state delegation remained solely Democratic.

== 1st congressional district ==
Incumbent Democratic Congressman Richard S. Whaley of the 1st congressional district, in office since 1913, defeated James G. Padgett in the Democratic primary and Republican J.O. Ladd in the general election.

=== Democratic primary ===
Democratic primary
Candidate	Votes	%
Richard S. Whaley	7,522	60.5
James G. Padgett	4,907	39.5

=== General election results ===
South Carolina's 1st congressional district election results, 1916
Party	Candidate	Votes	%	±%
Democratic	Richard S. Whaley (incumbent)	4,999	95.4	−3.1
Republican	J.O. Ladd	240	4.6	+3.6
Majority		4,759	90.8	−6.7
Turnout		5,239		
Democratic hold				

== 2nd congressional district ==
Incumbent Democratic Congressman James F. Byrnes of the 2nd congressional district, in office since 1911, defeated Alvin Etheredge in the Democratic primary and Republican Isaac Myers in the general election.

=== Democratic primary ===
Democratic primary
Candidate	Votes	%
James F. Byrnes	6,785	79.6
Alvin Etheredge	1,742	20.4

=== General election results ===
South Carolina's 2nd congressional district election results, 1916
Party	Candidate	Votes	%	±%
Democratic	James F. Byrnes (incumbent)	7,681	98.5	−1.5
Republican	Isaac Myers	120	1.5	+1.5
Majority		7,561	97.0	−3.0
Turnout		7,801		
Democratic hold				

== 3rd congressional district ==
Incumbent Democratic Congressman Wyatt Aiken of the 3rd congressional district, in office since 1903, was defeated in the Democratic primary by Frederick H. Dominick. He was unopposed in the general election.

=== Democratic primary ===
Democratic primary
Candidate	Votes	%
Frederick H. Dominick	7,021	29.1
Wyatt Aiken	6,095	25.3
Henry C. Tillman	4,862	20.1
A.H. Dagnell	3,814	15.8
John A. Horton	2,344	9.7

Democratic primary runoff
Candidate	Votes	%	±%
Frederick H. Dominick	12,762	55.3	+26.2
Wyatt Aiken	10,298	44.7	+19.4

=== General election results ===
South Carolina's 3rd congressional district election results, 1916
Party	Candidate	Votes	%	±%
Democratic	Frederick H. Dominick	9,447	100.0	0.0
No party	Write-Ins	1	0.0	0.0
Majority		9,446	100.0	0.0
Turnout		9,448		
Democratic hold				

== 4th congressional district ==
Incumbent Democratic Congressman Samuel J. Nicholls of the 4th congressional district, in office since 1915, won the Democratic primary and defeated Republican G.F. Mills in the general election.

=== Democratic primary ===
Democratic primary
Candidate	Votes	%
Samuel J. Nicholls	12,901	72.0
D.B. Traxler	3,391	18.9
J.H. Miller	1,623	9.1

=== General election results ===
South Carolina's 4th congressional district election results, 1916
Party	Candidate	Votes	%	±%
Democratic	Samuel J. Nicholls (incumbent)	11,312	99.4	−0.6
Republican	G.F. Mills	74	0.6	+0.6
Majority		11,238	98.8	−1.2
Turnout		11,386		
Democratic hold				

== 5th congressional district ==
Incumbent Democratic Congressman David E. Finley of the 5th congressional district, in office since 1899, defeated William F. Stevenson in the Democratic primary and was unopposed in the general election.

=== Democratic primary ===
Democratic primary
Candidate	Votes	%
David E. Finley	9,617	52.2
William F. Stevenson	8,803	47.8

=== General election results ===
South Carolina's 5th congressional district election results, 1916
Party	Candidate	Votes	%	±%
Democratic	David E. Finley (incumbent)	8,846	100.0	0.0
Majority		8,846	100.0	0.0
Turnout		8,846		
Democratic hold				

== 6th congressional district ==
Incumbent Democratic Congressman J. Willard Ragsdale of the 6th congressional district, in office since 1913, won the Democratic primary and defeated Republican W.L. McFarlan in the general election.

=== Democratic primary ===
Democratic primary
Candidate	Votes	%
J. Willard Ragsdale	10,220	52.2
Julius S. McInnes	7,981	40.7
Josiah J. Evans	1,398	7.1

=== General election results ===
South Carolina's 6th congressional district election results, 1916
Party	Candidate	Votes	%	±%
Democratic	J. Willard Ragsdale (incumbent)	9,767	99.1	−0.9
Republican	W.L. McFarlan	87	0.9	+0.9
Majority		9,680	98.2	−1.8
Turnout		9,854		
Democratic hold				

== 7th congressional district ==
Incumbent Democratic Congressman Asbury Francis Lever of the 7th congressional district, in office since 1901, defeated Republican challenger I.S. Leevy.

=== General election results ===
South Carolina's 7th congressional district election results, 1916
Party	Candidate	Votes	%	±%
Democratic	Asbury F. Lever (incumbent)	9,817	93.5	−1.6
Republican	I.S. Leevy	683	6.5	+2.4
Majority		9,134	87.0	−4.0
Turnout		10,500		
Democratic hold				

== See also ==
- United States House of Representatives elections, 1916
- South Carolina gubernatorial election, 1916
- South Carolina's congressional districts
