= 1900 United States House of Representatives elections in South Carolina =

The 1900 United States House of Representatives elections in South Carolina was held on Tuesday November 6, to elected seven United States Representatives of South Carolina. Five Democratic incumbents were re-elected and two incumbents were defeated in the primaries, but the seats were retained by the Democrats. The composition of South Carolina delegation after the election was solely Democratic.

== 1st congressional district ==
Incumbent Democratic Congressman William Elliott of the 1st congressional district, in office since 1897, defeated Republican challenger W.W. Beckett.

=== General election results ===
South Carolina's 1st congressional district election results, 1900
Party	Candidate	Votes	%	±%
Democratic	William Elliott (incumbent)	3,666	72.7	+6.2
Republican	W.W. Beckett	1,378	27.3	−6.2
Majority		2,288	45.4	+12.4
Turnout		5,044		
Democratic hold				

== 2nd congressional district ==
Incumbent Democratic Congressman W. Jasper Talbert of the 2nd congressional district, in office since 1893, defeated Republican challenger J.B. Odom.

=== General election results ===
South Carolina's 2nd congressional district election results, 1900
Party	Candidate	Votes	%	±%
Democratic	W. Jasper Talbert (incumbent)	6,713	97.7	+0.7
Republican	J.B. Odom	156	2.3	−0.6
Majority		6,557	95.4	+1.3
Turnout		6,869		
Democratic hold				

== 3rd congressional district ==
Incumbent Democratic Congressman Asbury Latimer of the 3rd congressional district, in office since 1893, won the Democratic primary and defeated Republican challenger Anson C. Merrick in the general election.

=== Democratic primary ===
Democratic primary
Candidate	Votes	%
Asbury Latimer	7,866	65.6
C.T. Wyche	2,883	24.1
E.E. Verner	1,233	10.3

=== General election results ===
South Carolina's 3rd congressional district election results, 1900
Party	Candidate	Votes	%	±%
Democratic	Asbury Latimer (incumbent)	7,834	97.5	+0.9
Republican	Anson C. Merrick	203	2.5	−0.8
Majority		7,631	95.0	+1.7
Turnout		8,037		
Democratic hold				

== 4th congressional district ==
Incumbent Democratic Congressman Stanyarne Wilson of the 4th congressional district, in office since 1895, was defeated in the Democratic primary by Joseph T. Johnson. He defeated Republican challenger S.T. Poinier in the general election.

=== Democratic primary ===
Democratic primary
Candidate	Votes	%
Joseph T. Johnson	11,428	56.5
Stanyarne Wilson	8,814	43.5

=== General election results ===
South Carolina's 4th congressional district election results, 1900
Party	Candidate	Votes	%	±%
Democratic	Joseph T. Johnson	8,189	97.0	+0.6
Republican	S.T. Poinier	251	3.0	−0.6
Majority		7,938	94.0	+1.2
Turnout		8,440		
Democratic hold				

== 5th congressional district ==
Incumbent Democratic Congressman David E. Finley of the 5th congressional district, in office since 1899, defeated Thomas J. Strait in the Democratic primary and Republican John F. Jones in the general election.

=== Democratic primary ===
Democratic primary
Candidate	Votes	%
David E. Finley	7,796	60.0
Thomas J. Strait	5,208	40.0

=== General election results ===
South Carolina's 5th congressional district election results, 1900
Party	Candidate	Votes	%	±%
Democratic	David E. Finley (incumbent)	6,634	97.3	−2.7
Republican	John F. Jones	183	2.7	+2.7
No party	Write-Ins	2	0.0	0.0
Majority		6,451	94.6	−5.4
Turnout		6,819		
Democratic hold				

== 6th congressional district ==
Incumbent Democratic Congressman James Norton of the 6th congressional district, in office since 1897, was defeated in the Democratic primary by Robert B. Scarborough. He defeated Republican R.A. Stuart in the general election.

=== Democratic primary ===
Democratic primary
Candidate	Votes	%
Robert B. Scarborough	5,921	43.2
James Norton	5,315	38.7
J. Edwin Ellerbe	2,484	18.1

Democratic primary runoff
Candidate	Votes	%	±%
Robert B. Scarborough	7,655	53.8	+10.6
James Norton	6,584	46.2	+7.5

=== General election results ===
South Carolina's 6th congressional district election results, 1900
Party	Candidate	Votes	%	±%
Democratic	Robert B. Scarborough	6,476	94.3	−2.6
Republican	R.A. Stuart	395	5.7	+2.6
Majority		6,081	88.6	−5.2
Turnout		6,871		
Democratic hold				

== 7th congressional district ==
Incumbent Democratic Congressman J. William Stokes of the 7th congressional district, in office since 1896, defeated Republican challenger Alexander D. Dantzler.

=== General election results ===
South Carolina's 7th congressional district election results, 1900
Party	Candidate	Votes	%	±%
Democratic	J. William Stokes (incumbent)	7,285	93.2	+3.4
Republican	Alexander D. Dantzler	534	6.8	−3.4
Majority		6,751	86.4	+6.8
Turnout		7,819		
Democratic hold				

== See also ==
- United States House of Representatives elections, 1900
- South Carolina gubernatorial election, 1900
- South Carolina's congressional districts
