= 1898 United States House of Representatives elections in South Carolina =

The 1898 United States House of Representatives elections in South Carolina were held on November 8, 1898, to select seven Representatives for two-year terms from the state of South Carolina. Six Democratic incumbents were re-elected and the open seat was retained by the Democrats. The composition of the state delegation after the election was solely Democratic.

== 1st congressional district ==
Incumbent Democratic Congressman William Elliott of the 1st congressional district, in office since 1897, defeated Republican challenger George W. Murray.

=== General election results ===
South Carolina's 1st congressional district election results, 1898
Party	Candidate	Votes	%	±%
Democratic	William Elliott (incumbent)	3,030	66.5	+2.8
Republican	George W. Murray	1,529	33.5	−2.8
No party	Write-Ins	1	0.0	0.0
Majority		1,501	33.0	+3.2
Turnout		4,560		
Democratic hold				

== 2nd congressional district ==
Incumbent Democratic Congressman W. Jasper Talbert of the 2nd congressional district, in office since 1893, defeated Republican challenger B.P. Chatfield.

=== General election results ===
South Carolina's 2nd congressional district election results, 1898
Party	Candidate	Votes	%	±%
Democratic	W. Jasper Talbert (incumbent)	4,013	97.0	+4.6
Republican	B.P. Chatfield	122	2.9	−4.4
No party	Write-Ins	4	0.1	−0.2
Majority		3,891	94.1	+9.0
Turnout		4,139		
Democratic hold				

== 3rd congressional district ==
Incumbent Democratic Congressman Asbury Latimer of the 3rd congressional district, in office since 1893, won the Democratic primary and defeated Republican challenger John R. Tolbert in the general election.

=== Democratic primary ===
Democratic primary
Candidate	Votes	%
Asbury Latimer	7,866	57.4
George Johnstone	3,621	26.5
Julius E. Boggs	2,210	16.1

=== General election results ===
South Carolina's 3rd congressional district election results, 1898
Party	Candidate	Votes	%	±%
Democratic	Asbury Latimer (incumbent)	9,746	96.6	+4.6
Republican	John R. Tolbert	332	3.3	−4.7
No party	Write-Ins	14	0.1	+0.1
Majority		9,414	93.3	+7.5
Turnout		10,092		
Democratic hold				

== 4th congressional district ==
Incumbent Democratic Congressman Stanyarne Wilson of the 4th congressional district, in office since 1895, won the Democratic primary and defeated Republican challenger P.S. Suber in the general election.

=== Democratic primary ===
Democratic primary
Candidate	Votes	%
Stanyarne Wilson	8,650	52.1
Joseph T. Johnson	7,089	42.7
M.L. Donaldson	872	5.2

=== General election results ===
South Carolina's 4th congressional district election results, 1898
Party	Candidate	Votes	%	±%
Democratic	Stanyarne Wilson (incumbent)	4,467	96.4	+4.2
Republican	P.S. Suber	165	3.6	−4.2
Majority		4,302	92.8	−4.8
Turnout		4,632		
Democratic hold				

== 5th congressional district ==
Incumbent Democratic Congressman Thomas J. Strait of the 5th congressional district, in office since 1893, lost the Democratic primary. David E. Finley defeated William A. Barber in the runoff and then Finley defeated Republican John F. Jones in the general election.

=== Democratic primary ===
Democratic primary
Candidate	Votes	%
David E. Finley	4,072	35.8
William A. Barber	2,741	24.1
Thomas J. Strait	2,210	19.4
William P. Pollock	881	7.8
J.K. Henry	795	7.0
E.J. Kennedy	676	5.9

Democratic primary runoff
Candidate	Votes	%	±%
David E. Finley	6,301	55.3	+19.5
William A. Barber	5,095	44.7	+20.6

=== General election results ===
South Carolina's 5th congressional district election results, 1898
Party	Candidate	Votes	%	±%
Democratic	David E. Finley	4,230	100.0	+9.0
No party	Write-Ins	1	0.0	0.0
Majority		4,229	100.0	+18.0
Turnout		4,231		
Democratic hold				

== 6th congressional district ==
Incumbent Democratic Congressman James Norton of the 6th congressional district, in office since 1897, defeated J. Edwin Ellerbe in the Democratic primary and Republican J.H. Evans in the general election.

=== Democratic primary ===
Democratic primary
Candidate	Votes	%
James Norton	5,410	50.3
J. Edwin Ellerbe	5,353	49.7

=== General election results ===
South Carolina's 6th congressional district election results, 1898
Party	Candidate	Votes	%	±%
Democratic	James Norton (incumbent)	4,765	96.9	+9.2
Republican	J.H. Evans	151	3.1	−9.1
Majority		4,614	93.8	+14.0
Turnout		4,916		
Democratic hold				

== 7th congressional district ==
Incumbent Democratic Congressman J. William Stokes of the 7th congressional district, in office since 1896, defeated Thomas F. Brantley in the Democratic primary and Republican James Weston in the general election.

=== Democratic primary ===
Democratic primary
Candidate	Votes	%
J. William Stokes	8,242	67.6
Thomas F. Brantley	3,951	32.4

=== General election results ===
South Carolina's 7th congressional district election results, 1898
Party	Candidate	Votes	%	±%
Democratic	J. William Stokes (incumbent)	4,433	89.8	+4.2
Republican	James Weston	505	10.2	−4.4
Majority		3,928	79.6	+8.2
Turnout		4,938		
Democratic hold				

== See also ==
- United States House of Representatives elections, 1898
- South Carolina gubernatorial election, 1898
- South Carolina's congressional districts
