= 1902 United States House of Representatives elections in South Carolina =

The 1902 United States House of Representatives elections in South Carolina were held on November 4, 1902, to select seven Representatives for two-year terms from the state of South Carolina. Four incumbents were re-elected and the three open seats were retained by the Democrats. The composition of the state delegation after the election was solely Democratic.

== 1st congressional district ==
Incumbent Democratic Congressman William Elliott of the 1st congressional district, in office since 1897, opted to run for the U.S. Senate instead of seeking re-election. George Swinton Legaré defeated Thomas W. Bacot in the Democratic primary and Republican challenger Aaron P. Prioleau in the general election.

=== Democratic primary ===
Democratic primary
Candidate	Votes	%
George Swinton Legaré	7,466	67.5
Thomas W. Bacot	3,597	32.5

=== General election results ===
South Carolina's 1st congressional district election results, 1902
Party	Candidate	Votes	%	±%
Democratic	George Swinton Legaré	3,749	95.5	+22.8
Republican	Aaron P. Prioleau	175	4.5	−22.8
Majority		3,574	91.0	+45.6
Turnout		3,924		
Democratic hold				

== 2nd congressional district ==
Incumbent Democratic Congressman W. Jasper Talbert of the 2nd congressional district, in office since 1893, opted to run for governor instead of seeking re-election. George W. Croft won the Democratic primary and defeated Republican challenger W.S. Dixon in the general election.

=== Democratic primary ===
Democratic primary
Candidate	Votes	%
George W. Croft	4,096	34.4
G. Duncan Bellinger	3,974	33.4
J. William Thurmond	3,826	32.2

Democratic primary runoff
Candidate	Votes	%	±%
George W. Croft	5,971	50.5	+16.1
G. Duncan Bellinger	5,847	49.5	+16.1

=== General election results ===
South Carolina's 2nd congressional district election results, 1902
Party	Candidate	Votes	%	±%
Democratic	George W. Croft	5,134	94.9	−2.8
Republican	W.S. Dixon	274	5.0	+2.7
No party	Write-Ins	4	0.1	+0.1
Majority		4,860	89.9	−5.5
Turnout		5,412		
Democratic hold				

== 3rd congressional district ==
Incumbent Democratic Congressman Asbury Latimer of the 3rd congressional district, in office since 1893, opted to run for the U.S. Senate instead of seeking re-election. Wyatt Aiken won the Democratic primary and defeated Republican challenger John Scott in the general election.

=== Democratic primary ===
Democratic primary
Candidate	Votes	%
Wyatt Aiken	3,642	22.6
R.F. Smith	2,828	17.5
George E. Prince	2,617	16.2
I.H. McCalla	2,466	15.3
S.Y. Stribling	2,197	13.6
E. Marion Rucker	1,206	7.5
W.N. Graydon	1,180	7.3

Democratic primary runoff
Candidate	Votes	%	±%
Wyatt Aiken	8,772	55.8	+33.2
R.F. Smith	6,956	44.2	+26.7

=== General election results ===
South Carolina's 3rd congressional district election results, 1902
Party	Candidate	Votes	%	±%
Democratic	Wyatt Aiken	5,082	98.9	+1.4
Republican	John Scott	58	1.1	−1.4
Majority		5,024	97.8	+2.8
Turnout		5,140		
Democratic hold				

== 4th congressional district ==
Incumbent Democratic Congressman Joseph T. Johnson of the 4th congressional district, in office since 1901, defeated Stanyarne Wilson in the Democratic primary and Republican L.W.C. Blalock in the general election.

=== Democratic primary ===
Democratic primary
Candidate	Votes	%
Joseph T. Johnson	10,331	64.9
Stanyarne Wilson	5,585	35.1

=== General election results ===
South Carolina's 4th congressional district election results, 1902
Party	Candidate	Votes	%	±%
Democratic	Joseph T. Johnson (incumbent)	4,642	98.7	+1.7
Republican	L.W.C. Blalock	61	1.3	−1.7
Majority		4,581	97.4	+3.4
Turnout		4,703		
Democratic hold				

== 5th congressional district ==
Incumbent Democratic Congressman David E. Finley of the 5th congressional district, in office since 1899, defeated T. Yancey Williams in the Democratic primary and Republican C.P.T. White in the general election.

=== Democratic primary ===
Democratic primary
Candidate	Votes	%
David E. Finley	9,823	62.8
T. Yancey Williams	5,809	37.2

=== General election results ===
South Carolina's 5th congressional district election results, 1902
Party	Candidate	Votes	%	±%
Democratic	David E. Finley (incumbent)	4,535	99.3	+2.0
Republican	C.P.T. White	34	0.7	−2.0
Majority		4,501	98.6	+4.0
Turnout		4,569		
Democratic hold				

== 6th congressional district ==
Incumbent Democratic Congressman Robert B. Scarborough of the 6th congressional district, in office since 1901, was unopposed in his bid for re-election.

=== General election results ===
South Carolina's 6th congressional district election results, 1902
Party	Candidate	Votes	%	±%
Democratic	Robert B. Scarborough (incumbent)	3,981	100.0	+5.7
Majority		3,981	100.0	+11.4
Turnout		3,981		
Democratic hold				

== 7th congressional district ==
Incumbent Democratic Congressman Asbury Francis Lever of the 7th congressional district, in office since 1901, defeated J.B. McLaughlin in the Democratic primary and Republican challenger Alexander D. Dantzler in the general election.

=== Democratic primary ===
Democratic primary
Candidate	Votes	%
Asbury Francis Lever	10,574	83.2
J.B. McLaughlin	2,132	16.8

=== General election results ===
South Carolina's 7th congressional district election results, 1902
Party	Candidate	Votes	%	±%
Democratic	Asbury Francis Lever (incumbent)	4,220	96.2	−3.8
Republican	Alexander D. Dantzler	167	3.8	+3.8
No party	Write-Ins	1	0.0	0.0
Majority		4,053	92.4	−7.6
Turnout		4,388		
Democratic hold				

== See also ==
- United States House of Representatives elections, 1902
- South Carolina gubernatorial election, 1902
- South Carolina's congressional districts
