= Sellers, South Carolina =

- Town
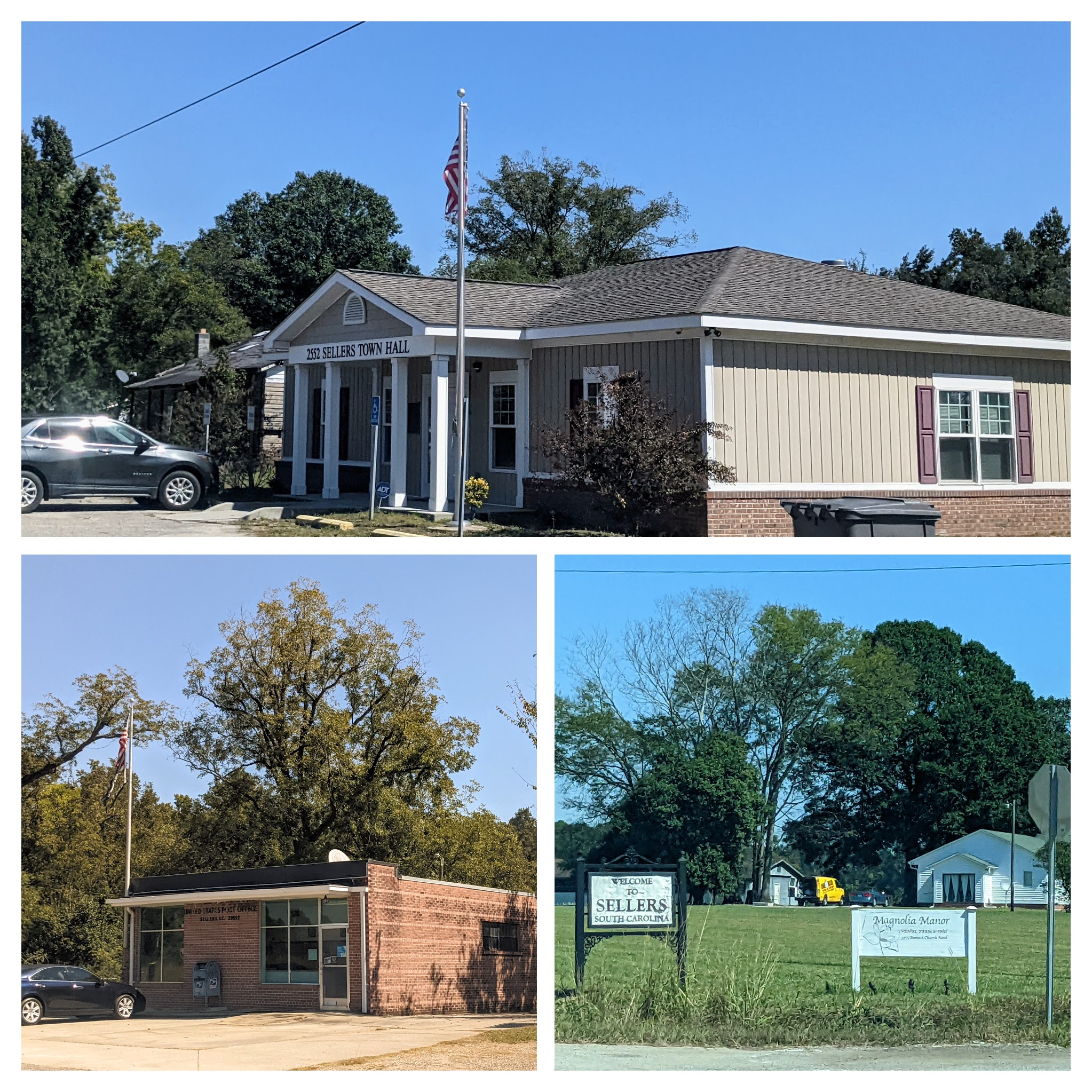
- Collage of photos from Sellers

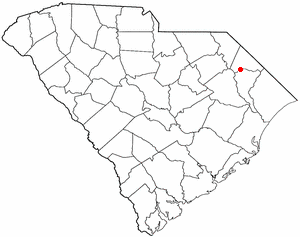
- Location of Sellers in South Carolina
- Coordinates: 34°16′57″N 79°28′20″W
- Country: United States
- State: South Carolina
- County: Marion

Area
  - Total: 0.67 sq mi (1.73 km^{2})
  - Land: 0.67 sq mi (1.73 km^{2})
  - Water: 0 sq mi (0.00 km^{2})
- Elevation: 79 ft (24 m)

Population (2020)
  - Total: 147
  - Density: 219.6/sq mi (84.78/km^{2})
- Time zone: UTC-5 (EST)
  - Summer (DST): UTC-4 (EDT)
- ZIP code: 29592
- Area codes: 843, 854
- FIPS code: 45-65005
- GNIS feature ID: 2407309

Sellers is a small town in Marion County, South Carolina, United States. As of the 2020 census, Sellers had a population of 147.

== Geography ==
According to the United States Census Bureau, the town has a total area of 0.7 square mile (1.8 km^{2}), all land.

== Demographics ==
Historical population
Census	Pop.	Note	%±
1910	458		—
1920	483		5.5%
1930	690		42.9%
1940	681		−1.3%
1950	530		−22.2%
1960	431		−18.7%
1970	469		8.8%
1980	388		−17.3%
1990	358		−7.7%
2000	277		−22.6%
2010	219		−20.9%
2020	147		−32.9%
U.S. Decennial Census

=== Racial and ethnic composition ===
Sellers town, South Carolina – Racial and ethnic composition Note: the US Census treats Hispanic/Latino as an ethnic category. This table excludes Latinos from the racial categories and assigns them to a separate category. Hispanics/Latinos may be of any race.
Race / Ethnicity (NH = Non-Hispanic)	Pop 2000	Pop 2010	Pop 2020	% 2000	% 2010	% 2020
White alone (NH)	40	41	12	14.44%	18.72%	8.16%
Black or African American alone (NH)	237	173	129	85.56%	79.00%	87.76%
Native American or Alaska Native alone (NH)	0	0	0	0.00%	0.00%	0.00%
Asian alone (NH)	0	0	1	0.00%	0.00%	0.68%
Native Hawaiian or Pacific Islander alone (NH)	0	0	0	0.00%	0.00%	0.00%
Other race alone (NH)	0	0	0	0.00%	0.00%	0.00%
Mixed race or Multiracial (NH)	0	2	2	0.00%	0.91%	1.36%
Hispanic or Latino (any race)	0	3	3	0.00%	1.37%	2.04%
Total	277	219	147	100.00%	100.00%	100.00%

=== 2000 census ===
As of the census of 2000, there were 277 people, 111 households, and 65 families residing in the town. The population density was 398.9 inhabitants per square mile (154.0/km^{2}). There were 127 housing units at an average density of 182.9 per square mile (70.6/km^{2}). The racial makeup of the town was 85.56% African American and 14.44% White.

There were 111 households, out of which 25.2% had children under the age of 18 living with them, 26.1% were married couples living together, 26.1% had a female householder with no husband present, and 41.4% were non-families. 38.7% of all households were made up of individuals, and 10.8% had someone living alone who was 65 years of age or older. The average household size was 2.50 and the average family size was 3.46.

In the town, the population was widely distributed by age, with 27.4% under the age of 18, 10.5% from 18 to 24, 29.2% from 25 to 44, 22.0% from 45 to 64, and 10.8% who were 65 years of age or older. The median age was 35 years. For every 100 females, there were 76.4 males. For every 100 females age 18 and over, there were 74.8 males.

The median income for a household in the town was $14,688, and the median income for a family was $16,964. Males had a median income of $19,531 versus $13,125 for females. The per capita income for the town was $6,325. About 50.7% of families and 50.0% of the population were below the poverty line, including 55.9% of those under the age of eighteen and 58.5% of those 65 or over.
