= Samuel J. Nicholls =

American politician

Samuel Jones Nicholls
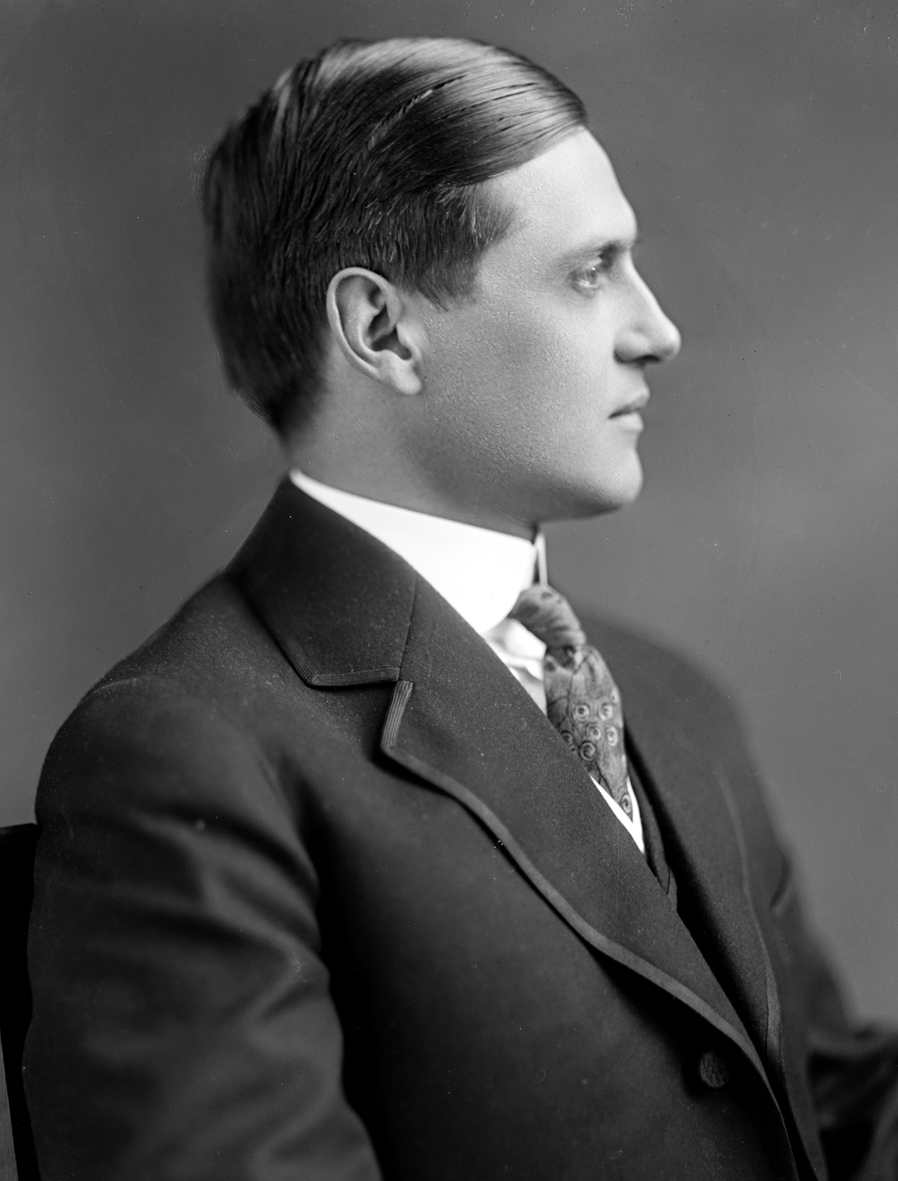

Member of the U.S. House of Representatives from South Carolina's 4th district
- In office September 14, 1915 – March 3, 1921
- Preceded by: Joseph T. Johnson
- Succeeded by: John J. McSwain

Member of the South Carolina House of Representatives from Spartanburg County
- In office January 8, 1907 – February 12, 1909

Personal details
- Born: May 7, 1885 Spartanburg, South Carolina, U.S.
- Died: November 23, 1937 (aged 52) Spartanburg, South Carolina, U.S.
- Resting place: Spartanburg, South Carolina
- Party: Democratic
- Education: Wofford College; Virginia Polytechnic Institute; University of Chicago Law School

Military service
- Branch/service: South Carolina National Guard
- Rank: Captain
- Commands: Company I, First Infantry Regiment

Samuel Jones Nicholls (May 7, 1885 – November 23, 1937) was a United States representative from South Carolina. He was born in Spartanburg, South Carolina. He attended Bingham Military Institute in Asheville, North Carolina; Wofford College, in Spartanburg, South Carolina; Virginia Polytechnic Institute in Blacksburg, Virginia; and the University of Chicago Law School. He was admitted to the bar in 1906 and commenced practice in Spartanburg.

Nicholls was the city attorney of Spartanburg and prosecuting attorney of Spartanburg County, South Carolina. He was a member of the South Carolina House of Representatives 1907-1908. He served by special appointment as circuit judge and as associate justice of the Supreme Court of South Carolina. He also organized and was captain for three years of Company I, First Regiment, South Carolina National Guard Infantry.

Nicholls was elected as a Democrat to the Sixty-fourth Congress to fill the vacancy caused by the resignation of Joseph T. Johnson. He was reelected to the Sixty-fifth and Sixty-sixth Congresses and served from September 14, 1915 to March 3, 1921 and declined to be a candidate for renomination in 1920. He resumed the practice of law in Spartanburg, South Carolina until his death there on November 23, 1937. He is buried in West Oakwood Cemetery.

U.S. House of Representatives
Preceded by Joseph T. Johnson	Member of the U.S. House of Representatives from South Carolina's 4th congressional district 1915 – 1921	Succeeded by John J. McSwain
