= Thomas J. Strait =

American politician (1846–1924)

Thomas Jefferson Strait
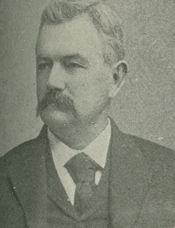

Member of the U.S. House of Representatives from South Carolina's 5th district
- In office March 4, 1893 – March 3, 1899
- Preceded by: John J. Hemphill
- Succeeded by: David E. Finley

Member of the South Carolina Senate
- In office 1890 – 1893

Personal details
- Born: December 25, 1846 Chester District, South Carolina
- Died: April 18, 1924 (aged 77) Lancaster, South Carolina
- Party: Democratic
- Spouse: Katherine Lathrop
- Education: South Carolina Medical College
- Occupation: physician

Military service
- Allegiance: Confederate States
- Branch/service: Confederate States Army
- Years of service: 1862 – 1865
- Rank: Sergeant
- Unit: 6th South Carolina Infantry, 24th South Carolina Infantry
- Battles/wars: American Civil War

Thomas Jefferson Strait (December 25, 1846 – April 18, 1924) was a U.S. representative from South Carolina.

== Biography ==
Born in Chester District, South Carolina, Strait attended the common schools of Mayesville, South Carolina, and Cooper Institute, Mississippi. During the Civil War entered the Confederate States Army in 1862 and served throughout the war, first in Company A, Sixth Regiment of Infantry, and later as sergeant in Company H, Twenty-fourth Regiment, Gist's brigade. He engaged in agricultural pursuits. He taught school in Ebenezer, South Carolina, in 1880. He was graduated from South Carolina Medical College at Charleston in 1885 and practiced medicine. He served as member of the State senate 1890-1893.

Strait was elected as a Democrat to the Fifty-third, Fifty-fourth, and Fifty-fifth Congresses (March 4, 1893 – March 3, 1899). He was an unsuccessful candidate for renomination in 1898 to the Fifty-sixth Congress. He resumed the practice of his profession in Lancaster, South Carolina, and died there on April 18, 1924. He was interred in Westside Cemetery.

== Sources ==
- United States Congress. "Thomas J. Strait (id: S000989)". Biographical Directory of the United States Congress.

U.S. House of Representatives
Preceded by John J. Hemphill	Member of the U.S. House of Representatives from South Carolina's 5th congressional district 1893 – 1899	Succeeded by David E. Finley
