= J. Willard Ragsdale =

American politician

James Willard Ragsdale
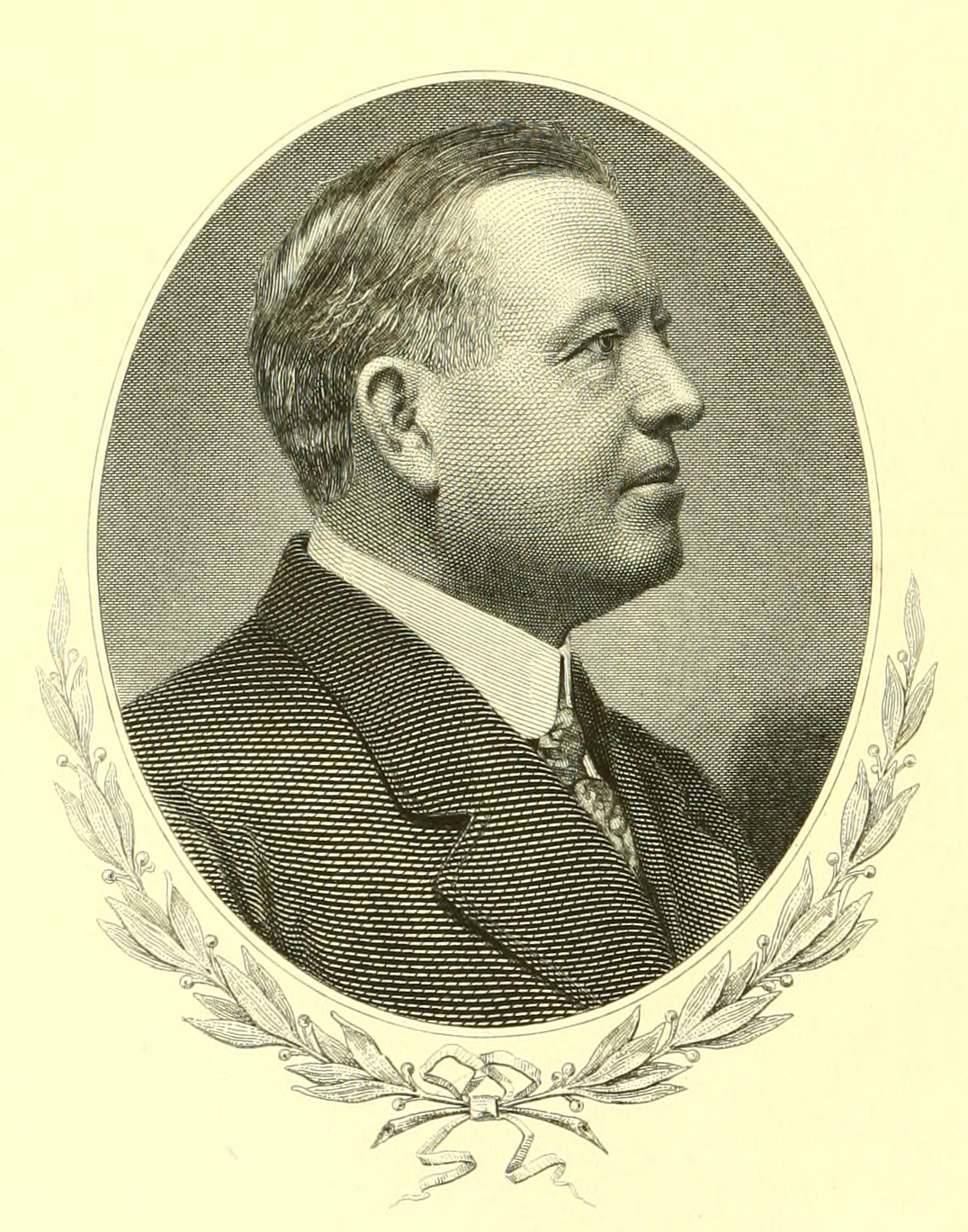

Member of the U.S. House of Representatives from South Carolina's 6th district
- In office March 4, 1913 – July 23, 1919
- Preceded by: J. Edwin Ellerbe
- Succeeded by: Philip H. Stoll

Member of the South Carolina Senate
- In office 1902–1904

Member of the South Carolina House of Representatives
- In office 1899–1900

Personal details
- Born: December 14, 1872 Timmonsville, South Carolina
- Died: July 23, 1919 (aged 46) Washington, D.C.
- Resting place: Florence, South Carolina
- Party: Democratic
- Education: University of South Carolina
- Profession: Lawyer, politician
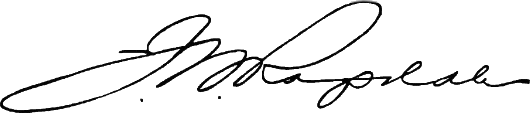
- Signature

James Willard Ragsdale (December 14, 1872 – July 23, 1919) was a U.S. representative from South Carolina.

Born in Timmonsville, South Carolina, Ragsdale attended the public schools. He was employed in a railroad office at Wilmington, North Carolina, for several years. He attended the University of South Carolina at Columbia. He studied law. He was admitted to the bar in 1898 and commenced practice in Florence, South Carolina. He engaged in agricultural pursuits and banking. Trustee of the South Carolina Industrial School. He served as member of the State house of representatives 1899-1900. He served as member of the State senate 1902-1904. He was an unsuccessful candidate for attorney general of South Carolina and for election in 1910 to the Sixty-second Congress.

Ragsdale was elected as a Democrat to the Sixty-third and to the three succeeding Congresses and served from March 4, 1913, until his death in Washington, D.C., July 23, 1919. He was interred in Mount Hope Cemetery, Florence, South Carolina.

== See also ==
- List of members of the United States Congress who died in office (1900–1949)

== Sources ==
- United States Congress. "J. Willard Ragsdale (id: R000010)". Biographical Directory of the United States Congress.
- J. Willard Ragsdale, late a representative from South Carolina, Memorial addresses delivered in the House of Representatives and Senate frontispiece 1921

U.S. House of Representatives
Preceded by J. Edwin Ellerbe	Member of the U.S. House of Representatives from South Carolina's 6th congressional district 1913–1919	Succeeded by Philip H. Stoll
