= James O. Patterson =

American politician

James O'Hanlan Patterson
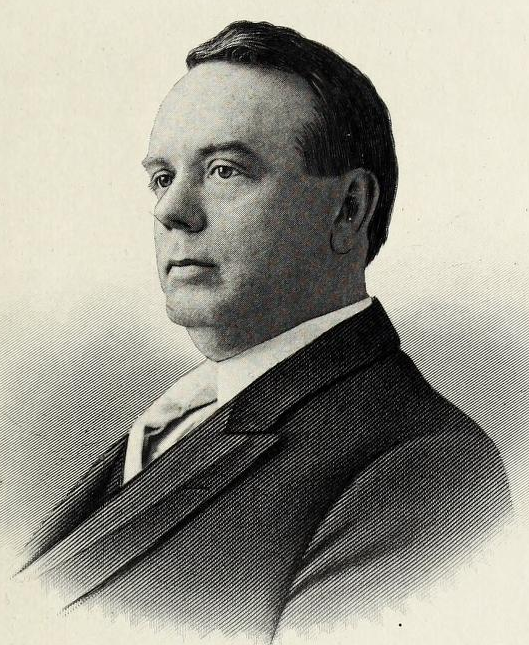
- From Volume 3 of 1908's Men of Mark in South Carolina

Member of the U.S. House of Representatives from South Carolina's 2nd district
- In office March 4, 1905 – March 3, 1911
- Preceded by: Theodore G. Croft
- Succeeded by: James F. Byrnes

Member of the South Carolina House of Representatives from Barnwell County
- In office January 10, 1899 – February 20, 1904

Personal details
- Born: June 25, 1857 Barnwell, South Carolina, U.S.
- Died: October 25, 1911 (aged 54) Barnwell, South Carolina, U.S.
- Resting place: Orangeburg, South Carolina
- Party: Democratic
- Profession: attorney

James O'Hanlon Patterson (June 25, 1857 – October 25, 1911) was a United States representative from South Carolina.

== Biography ==
He was born in Barnwell, South Carolina. He attended private schools in town and also in Augusta, Georgia. Later, he studied law, was admitted to the bar in 1886, and commenced practice in Barnwell, South Carolina.

Patterson was a probate judge of Barnwell County, South Carolina 1888–1892 and a member of the South Carolina House of Representatives 1899–1904. He was elected as a Democrat to the Fifty-ninth, Sixtieth, and Sixty-first Congresses (March 4, 1905 – March 3, 1911). After leaving Congress, he resumed the practice of his profession in Barnwell, South Carolina where he died on October 25, 1911. He was buried in the Episcopal Cemetery.

== Sources ==
=== Books ===
- Hemphill, James Calvin (1908). Men of Mark in South Carolina. Vol. 3. Men of Mark Publishing: Washington, DC.

== External sources ==
- United States Congress. "James O. Patterson (id: P000118)". Biographical Directory of the United States Congress.
- James O. Patterson at Find a Grave

U.S. House of Representatives
Preceded by Theodore G. Croft	Member of the U.S. House of Representatives from South Carolina's 2nd congressional district 1905–1911	Succeeded by James F. Byrnes
