= George Swinton Legaré =

American politician

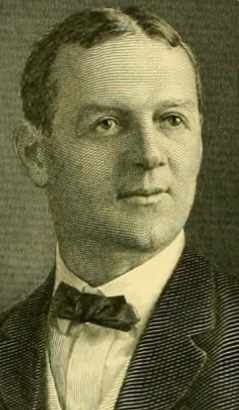
- Frontispiece of 1914's George S. Legaré, Late a Representative from South Carolina

Member of the U.S. House of Representatives from South Carolina's 1st district
- In office March 4, 1903 – January 31, 1913
- Preceded by: William Elliott
- Succeeded by: Richard S. Whaley

Corporation Counsel of Charleston, South Carolina
- In office 1898–1903
- Preceded by: Charles Inglesby
- Succeeded by: George F. Moffett

Personal details
- Born: November 11, 1869 Rockville, South Carolina, US
- Died: January 31, 1913 (aged 43) St. Andrews, South Carolina, US
- Resting place: Magnolia Cemetery (Charleston, South Carolina)
- Party: Democratic
- Spouse: Fannie Izlar (m. 1893)
- Children: 6
- Education: University of South Carolina; Georgetown University
- Profession: Lawyer

George Swinton Legaré (November 11, 1869 – January 31, 1913) was an American attorney and politician from South Carolina. He was best known for his service in the United States House of Representatives from 1903 until his death.

== Early life ==
Legaré was born in Rockville, South Carolina, the son of Edward T. and Kate (Malcolmson) Legaré. Shortly after birth, the Legaré family moved to Charleston. He graduated from Porter Military Academy in 1889. Legaré studied law at the University of South Carolina for two years, then transferred to Georgetown University Law School. He graduated from Georgetown with an LL.B. in 1893.

== Career ==
Legaré was admitted to the bar in 1893 and commenced a legal practice in Charleston. From 1898 to 1903, he served as Charleston's corporation counsel. He was elected as a Democrat to the Fifty-eighth and to the four succeeding Congresses and served from March 4, 1903 until his death. He had been reelected to the Sixty-third Congress, but died before the term started on March 4, 1913.

== Death ==
Legaré died in St. Andrews, near Charleston on January 31, 1913. He was buried at Magnolia Cemetery.

== Family ==
In 1893, Legaré married Fannie Izlar, the daughter of Judge James Izlar. They were the parents of six children, four of whom were living at the time of Legaré's death—Ferdinda, Julia, Hermina, and William.

== See also ==
- List of members of the United States Congress who died in office (1900–1949)

U.S. House of Representatives
Preceded by William Elliott	Member of the U.S. House of Representatives from South Carolina's 1st congressional district 1903-1913	Succeeded by Richard S. Whaley
