= J. Edwin Ellerbe =

American politician (1867–1916)

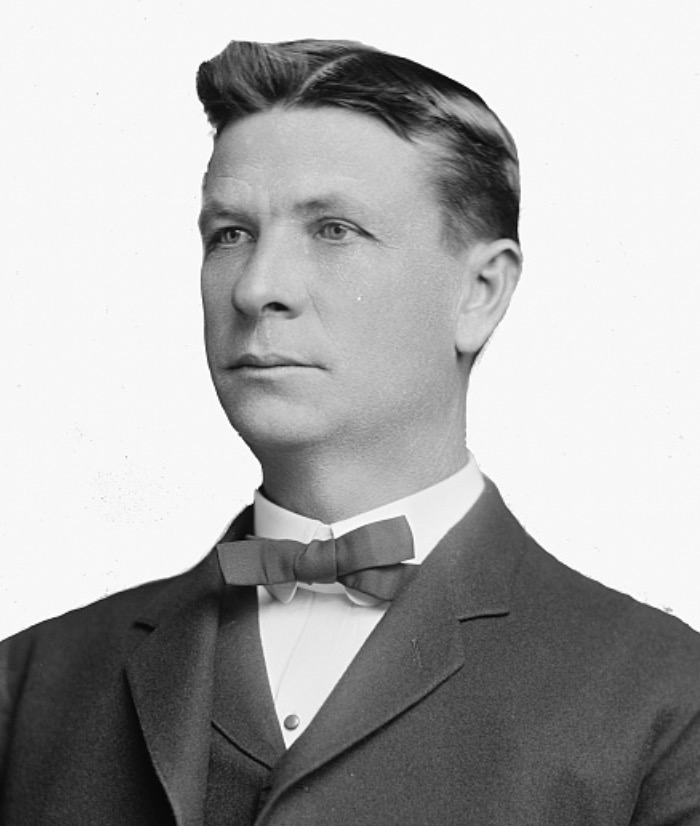
- Portrait of Ellerbe by Charles Milton Bell, taken between December 1903 and March 1905

Member of the U.S. House of Representatives from South Carolina's 6th district
- In office March 4, 1905 – March 3, 1913
- Preceded by: Robert B. Scarborough
- Succeeded by: J. Willard Ragsdale

Member of the South Carolina House of Representatives from the Marion County district
- In office 1894–1896

Personal details
- Born: James Edwin Ellerbe; January 12, 1867 Sellers, South Carolina, US
- Died: October 24, 1916 (aged 49) Asheville, North Carolina, US
- Party: Democratic
- Relations: William Haselden Ellerbe (brother)
- Profession: Politician

James Edwin Ellerbe (January 12, 1867 – October 17, 1916) was an American politician. A Democrat, he was a member of the United States House of Representatives from South Carolina. He was also the brother of Governor William Haselden Ellerbe.

== Early life and education ==
Ellerbe was born on January 12, 1867, in Sellers, South Carolina, one of thirteen children born to planter William S. Ellerbe and Sarah Elizabeth (née Haselden) Ellerbe. His older brother was Governor William Haselden Ellerbe. His family is the namesake of Ellerbe, North Carolina. He grew up in the Pee Dee region. Educated at Pine Hill Academy, he studied at the University of South Carolina and Wofford College, graduating from the latter in 1887. He lived near Marion and worked as a farmer and merchant.

== Career ==
Ellerbe was a Democrat. From 1894 to 1896, he represented Marion County in the South Carolina House of Representatives. He was a delegate to the 1895 South Carolina state constitutional convention. Ellerbe was a member of the United States House of Representatives from March 4, 1905, to March 3, 1913, representing South Carolina's 6th district. He lost the primaries to the following election. During his tenure, South Carolina was heavily dominated by Democrats. Politically, he was liberal, more so than most in Congress at the time. He was a member of the Committees on Irrigation of Arid Lands, on Railways and Canals, and on Rivers and Harbors.

After serving in Congress, Ellerbe returned to farming.

== Personal life and death ==
On November 23, 1887, Ellerbe married Nellie Converse Elford; they two children together. He was Methodist. He died on October 17, 1916, aged 49, in Asheville, North Carolina, from tuberculosis. He was buried in his family's tomb, at the Haselden Cemetery of Latta. He was an uncle of James Douglass Manning, Earle Rogers Ellerbe, and Frank Ellerbe, as well as the first cousin and brother-in-law of James Haselden Manning.

U.S. House of Representatives
Preceded by Robert B. Scarborough	Member of the U.S. House of Representatives from South Carolina's 6th congressional district 1905–1913	Succeeded by J. Willard Ragsdale
