= Wyatt Aiken =

American politician

Member of the U.S. House of Representatives from South Carolina's 3rd district
- In office March 4, 1903 – March 3, 1917
- Preceded by: Asbury Latimer
- Succeeded by: Frederick H. Dominick

Personal details
- Born: December 14, 1863 Bibb County, Georgia, United States
- Died: February 6, 1923 (aged 59) Abbeville, South Carolina, United States
- Party: Democratic
- Profession: Court reporter

Military service
- Allegiance: United States
- Branch/service: United States Army
- Years of service: 1898
- Rank: Private
- Unit: 1st South Carolina Infantry Regiment
- Battles/wars: Spanish–American War

Wyatt Aiken (December 14, 1863 – February 6, 1923) was elected to the U.S. House of Representatives for South Carolina's 3rd congressional district. He served for six terms from 1903 to 1917.

== Early life and family ==
Wyatt Aiken was born near Macon, Georgia on December 14, 1863. He was the son of David Wyatt Aiken, who was the 3rd district's representative from 1877 to 1887. He was reared in Cokesbury, Abbeville County (now Greenwood County). After attending the Cokesbury public schools and of Washington, D.C., he served as the official court reporter for the second South Carolina judicial circuit and, later, for the eighth circuit.

== During the Spanish American War ==
During the Spanish–American War, he volunteered as a private in Company A, First South Carolina Regiment of Infantry. He was appointed battalion adjutant by Governor Ellerbe and acted as regimental quartermaster during the greater portion of his service. On November 10, 1898, he was mustered out in Columbia, South Carolina.

== Political career ==
Aiken was elected as a Democrat to the Fifty-eighth and to the six succeeding Congresses (March 4, 1903 to March 3, 1917). He was an unsuccessful candidate for renomination in 1916 and again in 1918.

== Death and legacy ==
Following his retirement, he lived in Abbeville, South Carolina. Aiken died on February 6, 1923.

U.S. House of Representatives
Preceded by Asbury Latimer	Member of the U.S. House of Representatives from South Carolina's 3rd congressional district 1903–1917	Succeeded by Frederick H. Dominick
