= Joseph T. Johnson =

American judge (1858–1919)

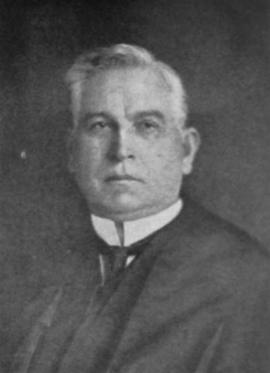

Judge of the United States District Court for the Western District of South Carolina
- In office March 9, 1915 – May 8, 1919
- Appointed by: Woodrow Wilson
- Preceded by: Seat established by 38 Stat. 961
- Succeeded by: Henry Hitt Watkins

Member of the U.S. House of Representatives from South Carolina's 4th district
- In office March 4, 1901 – April 19, 1915
- Preceded by: Stanyarne Wilson
- Succeeded by: Samuel J. Nicholls

Personal details
- Born: Joseph Travis Johnson; February 28, 1858 Brewerton, South Carolina, U.S.
- Died: May 8, 1919 (aged 61) Spartanburg, South Carolina, U.S.
- Party: Democratic
- Education: Erskine College (A.B.); Vanderbilt University Law School (LL.B.)

Joseph Travis Johnson (February 28, 1858 – May 8, 1919) was a United States representative from South Carolina and a United States district judge of the United States District Court for the Western District of South Carolina.

== Education and career ==
Born on February 28, 1858, in Brewerton, an unincorporated community in Laurens County, South Carolina, Johnson attended the common schools, then received an Artium Baccalaureus degree in 1879 from Erskine College and a Bachelor of Laws in 1883 from Vanderbilt University Law School. Prior to entering the bar, he taught school for several years. He was admitted to the bar and entered private practice in Laurens, South Carolina from 1883 to 1895. He continued in private practice in Spartanburg, South Carolina from 1895 to 1915.

== Congressional service ==
Johnson was elected as a Democrat to the United States House of Representatives of the 57th United States Congress and to the seven succeeding Congresses and served from March 4, 1901, until April 19, 1915, when he resigned to accept a federal judgeship.

== Federal judicial service ==
Johnson received a recess appointment from President Woodrow Wilson on March 9, 1915, to the United States District Court for the Western District of South Carolina, to a new seat authorized by 38 Stat. 961. He was nominated to the same position by President Wilson on January 4, 1916. He was confirmed by the United States Senate on January 24, 1916, and received his commission the same day. His service terminated on May 8, 1919, due to his death in Spartanburg. He was interred in Oakwood Cemetery in Spartanburg.

== Sources ==
- United States Congress. "Joseph T. Johnson (id: J000156)". Biographical Directory of the United States Congress.
- "Johnson, Joseph Travis - Federal Judicial Center". www.fjc.gov.

U.S. House of Representatives
Preceded by Stanyarne Wilson	Member of the U.S. House of Representatives from South Carolina's 4th congressional district 1901–1915	Succeeded by Samuel J. Nicholls
Legal offices
Preceded by Seat established by 38 Stat. 961	Judge of the United States District Court for the Western District of South Carolina; 1915–1919	Succeeded by Henry Hitt Watkins
