= David E. Finley =

American politician (1861–1917)

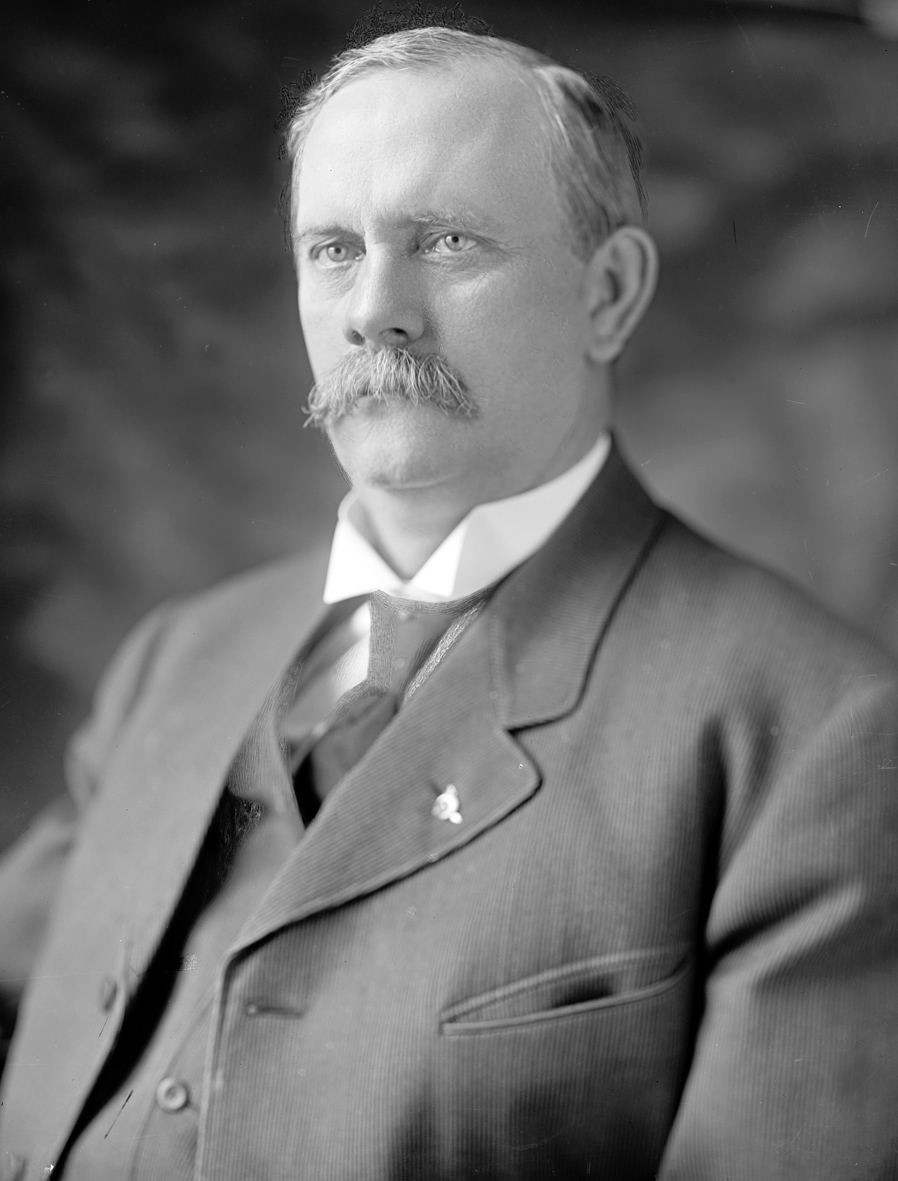

Member of the U.S. House of Representatives from South Carolina's 5th district
- In office March 4, 1899 – January 26, 1917
- Preceded by: Thomas J. Strait
- Succeeded by: Paul G. McCorkle

Member of the South Carolina Senate
- In office 1892 – 1896

Member of the South Carolina House of Representatives
- In office 1890 – 1891

Personal details
- Born: February 28, 1861 Trenton, Arkansas
- Died: January 26, 1917 (aged 55) Charlotte, North Carolina
- Resting place: York, South Carolina
- Party: Democratic
- Education: South Carolina College
- Occupation: lawyer

David E. Finley (February 28, 1861 – January 26, 1917) was a United States representative from South Carolina. He was born in Trenton, Arkansas. He attended the public schools of Rock Hill, South Carolina, and Ebenezer, South Carolina and was graduated from the law department of South Carolina College (now the University of South Carolina) at Columbia, South Carolina, in 1885. He was admitted to the bar in 1886 and commenced practice in York, South Carolina.

Finley was member of the South Carolina House of Representatives 1890–1891. He also served in the South Carolina Senate 1892–1896. He served as a trustee of the University of South Carolina 1890–1896. He was elected as a Democrat to the Fifty-sixth and to the eight succeeding Congresses and served from March 4, 1899, until his death. Prior to dying, he had been reelected to the Sixty-fifth Congress. He died in Charlotte, North Carolina, on January 26, 1917, and was buried in Rose Hill Cemetery, York, South Carolina.

Finley's son, David E. Finley, Jr., a prominent cultural leader in the United States in the 20th century, served as the first director of the National Gallery of Art and the founding chairman of the National Trust for Historic Preservation.

== See also ==
- List of members of the United States Congress who died in office (1900–1949)

U.S. House of Representatives
| Preceded by Thomas J. Strait | Member of the U.S. House of Representatives from South Carolina's 5th congressional district 1899 – 1917 | Succeeded by Paul G. McCorkle |
