= 1912 United States House of Representatives elections =

House elections for the 63rd U.S. Congress

- November 5, 1912 (Note: Maine and Vermont held elections early in September 1912.)

All 435 seats in the United States House of Representatives 218 seats needed for a majority
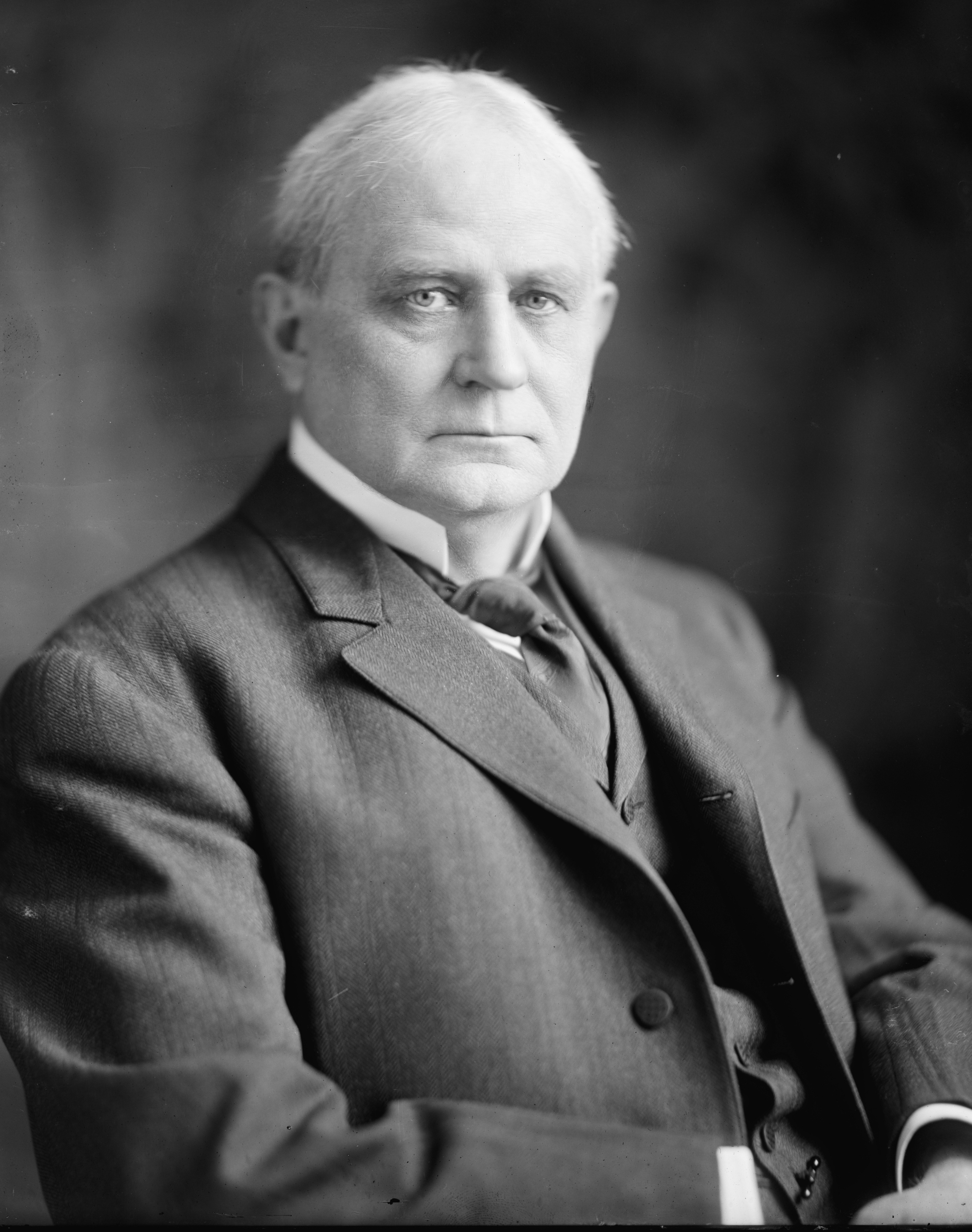

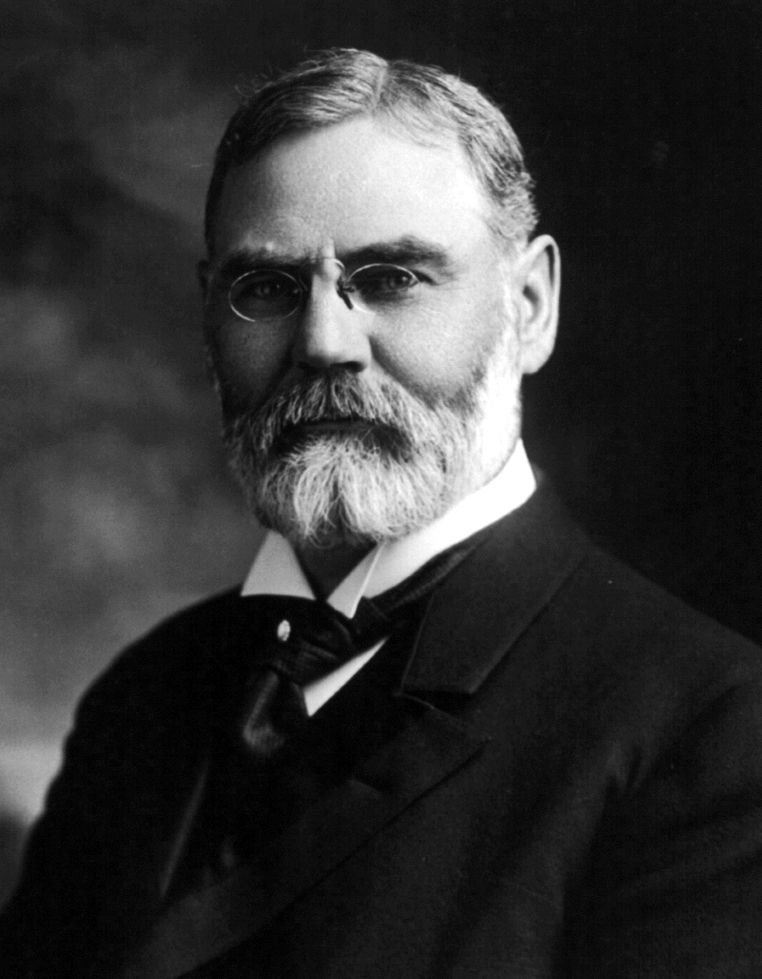
	Majority party	Minority party
Leader	Champ Clark	James Mann
Party	Democratic	Republican
Leader since	March 4, 1909	March 4, 1911
Leader's seat	Missouri 5th	Illinois 2nd
Last election	229 seats	162 seats
Seats won	291	134
Seat change	▲62	▼28
Popular vote	8,224,857	7,396,644
Percentage	43.12%	38.78%
Swing	▼3.42pp	▼7.62pp
	Third party	Fourth party
Party	Progressive	Socialist
Last election	0 seats	1 seat
Seats won	10 (Note: While William Kent would serve as an independent once sworn into Congress, he had been elected on the Progressive Ballot Line.) (Note: This includes two Congressmen elected on the Washington Ballot Line in Pennsylvania.)	0
Seat change	▲10	▼1
Popular vote	1,896,446 (Note: This includes votes for those who ran primarily on the Washington Party Ballot Line.)	1,507,806
Percentage	9.94%	7.90%
Swing	New party	▲3.61pp
	Fifth party
Party	Independent
Last election	2 seats (Note: Included one Progressive Republican (Theron Akin) and one Independent Democrat (Samuel Tribble))
Seats won	0
Seat change	▼2
Popular vote	49,622
Percentage	0.26%
Swing	▼0.21pp
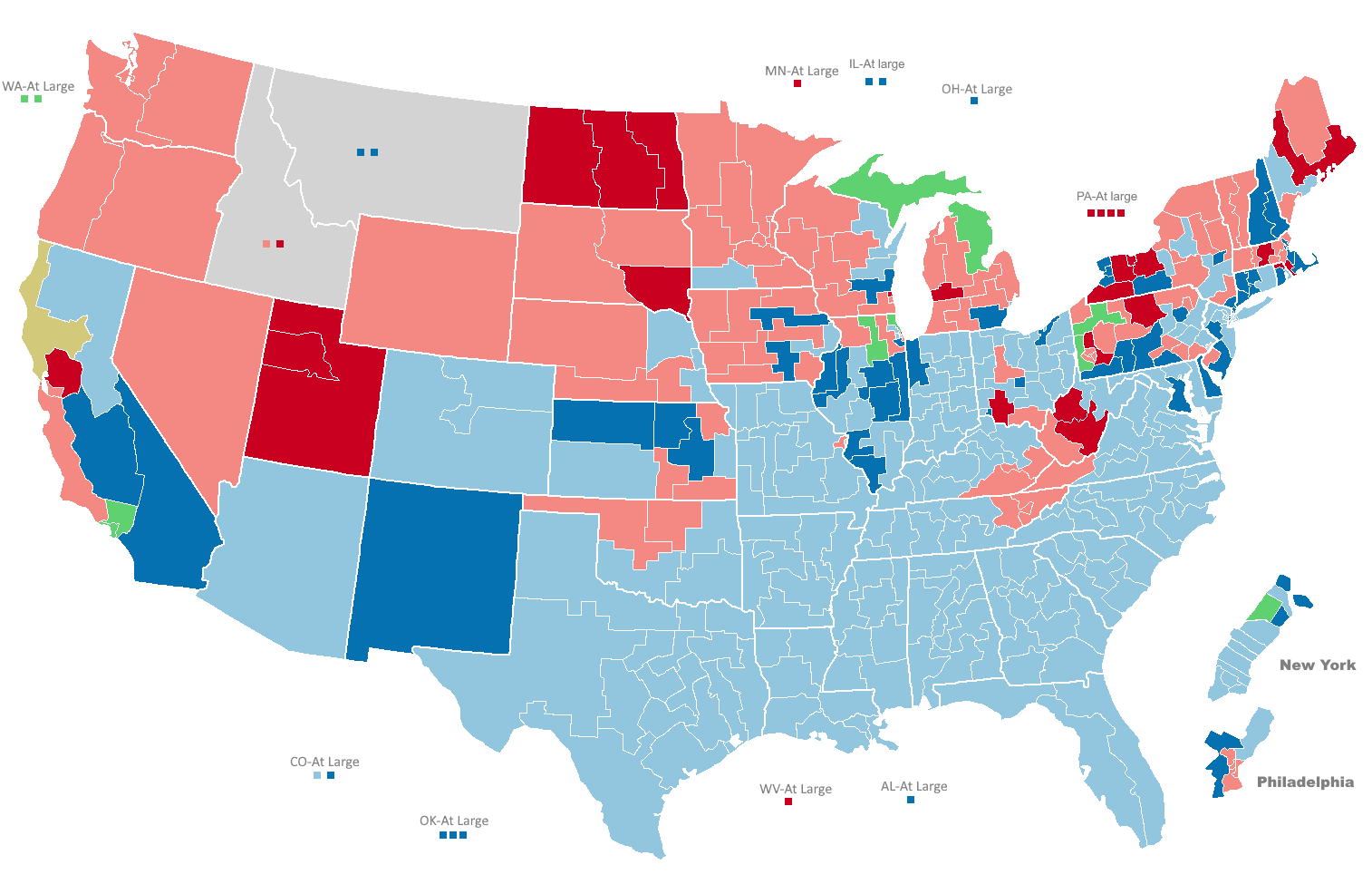
- Results: Democratic hold Democratic gain Republican hold Republican gain Progressive gain Independent gain
Speaker before election
Champ Clark
Democratic
Elected Speaker
Champ Clark
Democratic

The 1912 United States House of Representatives elections were elections for the United States House of Representatives to elect members to serve in the 63rd United States Congress. They were held for the most part on November 5, 1912, while Maine and Vermont held theirs in September. They coincided with the election of President Woodrow Wilson.

Wilson's victory was partly due to the division of the opposition Republican Party into conservative and progressive factions. While many progressives stayed within the party framework, they maintained lukewarm relationships with Republican leadership. Others formed a third party known as the Progressives and several switched allegiance to the Democrats. A message of unity was portrayed by the Democrats, allowing this group to present themselves as above the bickering and corruption that had become associated with the Republican internal feud. Many of the new seats that were added after the prior census ended up in Democratic hands. In addition, William Kent, who had been elected to the House as a Republican in 1908, was elected to California's 1st congressional district as an independent.

This was the first election after the congressional reapportionment based on the 1910 Census. The Apportionment Act of 1911 also guaranteed that Arizona and New Mexico would have one seat each after those states joined the union in early 1912. Under this reapportionment, the number of representatives was increased to 435, where it currently stands (the 435 seat cap was later made permanent after the passage of the Reapportionment Act of 1929, with the exception of 1959 when Alaska and Hawaii were admitted as states).

== Election summaries ==
In reapportionment following the 1910 census, 41 new seats were added, bringing the House to its modern size. This would be the last time the size of the House changed, except for a temporary addition of two seats in 1959 after the admission of Alaska and Hawaii and subsequent return to 435 in 1963. In the reapportionment, 1 state lost 1 seat, 22 states had no change in apportionment, 16 states gained 1 seat each, 5 states gained 2 seats each, 2 states gained 3 seats, 1 state gained 4 seats, and 1 state gained 6 seats. Twelve states used at-large seats in addition to districts to elect new seats.

↓
291	10	134
Democratic	(Note: There were 9 Progressives and 1 Independent)	Republican

Results of the 1912 United States House of Representatives elections
Political party	Leader	MOCs						Votes		
Political party	Leader	Contested	Total	Gained	Lost	Net	Of total (%)	Total	Of total (%)	Change (%)
Democratic	Champ Clark	431	291	71	10	▲61	66.90%	8,210,137	43.29%	-
Republican	James Mann	370	134	17	46	▼29	30.80%	7,377,514	38.90%	-
Progressive		208	8	8	0	▲8	1.84%	1,761,545	9.29%	-
Socialist		335	0	0	1	▼1	0%	1,505,576	7.94%	-
Prohibition		209	0	0	0	Steady	0%	279,036	1.47%	-
Washington		13	2	2	0	▲2	0.46%	130,073	0.69%	-
Keystone		8	0	0	0	Steady	0%	85,278	0.45%	-
Progressive Republican		2	0	0	0	Steady	0%	23,078	0.12%	-
Independent		25	0	0	0	Steady	0%	12,670	0.07%	-
Bull Moose		2	0	0	0	Steady	0%	10,460	0.06%	-
Socialist Labor		21	0	0	0	Steady	0%	8,499	0.04%	-
Independence		9	0	0	0	Steady	0%	7,470	0.04%	-
Roosevelt Progressive		1	0	0	0	Steady	0%	5,891	0.03%	-
National Progressive		2	0	0	0	Steady	0%	5,714	0.03%	-
Taft for President		1	0	0	0	Steady	0%	2,269	0.01%	-
Industrialist		1	0	0	0	Steady	0%	1,075	0.01%	-
Jefferson		1	0	0	0	Steady	0%	73	0.00%	-
Workingmen's		1	0	0	0	Steady	0%	15	0.00%	-
Total			435					18,967,165		

Popular vote
Democratic	43.29%
Republican	38.90%
Progressive	9.98%
Socialist	7.94%
Others	0.58%

House seats
Democratic	66.90%
Republican	30.80%
Progressive	2.30%

State	Type	Total seats (After reapportionment)		Democratic		Republican		Progressive		Independent	
State	Type	Seats	Change	Seats	Change	Seats	Change	Seats	Change	Seats	Change
Alabama	District +at-large (Note: Additional seat or seats elected at-large due to state not redistricting.)	10	▲1	10	▲1	0	Steady	0	Steady	0	Steady
Arizona	At-large	1	Steady	1	Steady	0	Steady	0	Steady	0	Steady
Arkansas	District	7	Steady	7	Steady	0	Steady	0	Steady	0	Steady
California	District	11	▲3	3	▲2	7	Steady	0	Steady	1	▲1
Colorado	District +2 at-large	4	▲1	4	▲1	0	Steady	0	Steady	0	Steady
Connecticut	District	5	Steady	5	▲4	0	▼4	0	Steady	0	Steady
Delaware	At-large	1	Steady	1	▲1	0	▼1	0	Steady	0	Steady
Florida	District +at-large	4	▲1	4	▲1	0	Steady	0	Steady	0	Steady
Georgia	District	12	▲1	12	▲1	0	Steady	0	Steady	0	Steady
Idaho	At-large	2	▲1	0	Steady	2	▲1	0	Steady	0	Steady
Illinois	District +2 at-large	27	▲2	20	▲9	5	▼9	2	▲2	0	Steady
Indiana	District	13	Steady	13	▲1	0	▼1	0	Steady	0	Steady
Iowa	District	11	Steady	3	▲2	8	▼2	0	Steady	0	Steady
Kansas	District	8	Steady	5	▲5	3	▼5	0	Steady	0	Steady
Kentucky	District	11	Steady	9	Steady	2	Steady	0	Steady	0	Steady
Louisiana	District	8	▲1	8	▲1	0	Steady	0	Steady	0	Steady
Maine (Note: Elections held early.)	District	4	Steady	1	▼1	3	▲1	0	Steady	0	Steady
Maryland	District	6	Steady	6	▲1	0	▼1	0	Steady	0	Steady
Massachusetts	District	16	▲2	7	▲3	9	▼1	0	Steady	0	Steady
Michigan	District +at-large	13	▲1	2	Steady	9	▼1	2	▲2	0	Steady
Minnesota	District +at-large	10	▲1	1	Steady	9	▲1	0	Steady	0	Steady
Mississippi	District	8	Steady	8	Steady	0	Steady	0	Steady	0	Steady
Missouri	District	16	Steady	15	▲2	1	▼2	0	Steady	0	Steady
Montana	At-large	2	▲1	2	▲2	0	▼1	0	Steady	0	Steady
Nebraska	District	6	Steady	3	Steady	3	Steady	0	Steady	0	Steady
Nevada	At-large	1	Steady	0	Steady	1	Steady	0	Steady	0	Steady
New Hampshire	District	2	Steady	2	▲2	0	▼2	0	Steady	0	Steady
New Jersey	District	12	▲2	11	▲4	1	▼2	0	Steady	0	Steady
New Mexico	At-large	1	▼1	1	Steady	0	▼1	0	Steady	0	Steady
New York	District	43	▲6	31	▲8	11	▼3	1	▲1	0	Steady
North Carolina	District	10	Steady	10	Steady	0	Steady	0	Steady	0	Steady
North Dakota	District	3	▲1	0	Steady	3	▲1	0	Steady	0	Steady
Ohio	District +at-large	22	▲1	19	▲3	3	▼2	0	Steady	0	Steady
Oklahoma	District +3 at-large	8	▲3	6	▲3	2	Steady	0	Steady	0	Steady
Oregon	District	3	▲1	0	Steady	3	▲1	0	Steady	0	Steady
Pennsylvania	District +4 at-large	36	▲4	12	▲4	22	▼2	2	▲2	0	Steady
Rhode Island	District	3	▲1	2	▲1	1	Steady	0	Steady	0	Steady
South Carolina	District	7	Steady	7	Steady	0	Steady	0	Steady	0	Steady
South Dakota	District	3	▲1	0	Steady	3	▲1	0	Steady	0	Steady
Tennessee	District	10	Steady	8	Steady	2	Steady	0	Steady	0	Steady
Texas	District +2 at-large	18	▲2	18	▲2	0	Steady	0	Steady	0	Steady
Utah	At-large	2	▲1	0	Steady	2	▲1	0	Steady	0	Steady
Vermont	District	2	Steady	0	Steady	2	Steady	0	Steady	0	Steady
Virginia	District	10	Steady	9	Steady	1	Steady	0	Steady	0	Steady
Washington	District +2 at-large	5	▲2	0	Steady	3	Steady	2	▲2	0	Steady
West Virginia	District +at-large	6	▲1	2	▼2	4	▲3	0	Steady	0	Steady
Wisconsin	District	11	Steady	3	▲1	8	(Note: Previous election had 1 Socialist.)	0	Steady	0	Steady
Wyoming	At-large	1	Steady	0	Steady	1	Steady	0	Steady	0	Steady
Total		435	▲41	291 66.9%	▲61	134 30.8%	▼29	9 2.1%	▲9	1 0.2%	▲1

Results shaded according to the winning candidate's share of popular vote

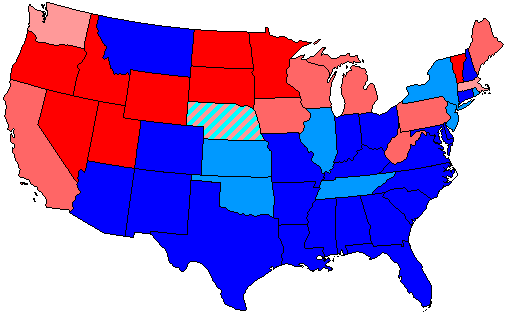
House seats by party holding plurality in state: 80+% Democratic; 80+% Republican; 60+ to 80% Democratic; 60+ to 80% Republican; Up to 60% Democratic; Up to 60% Republican

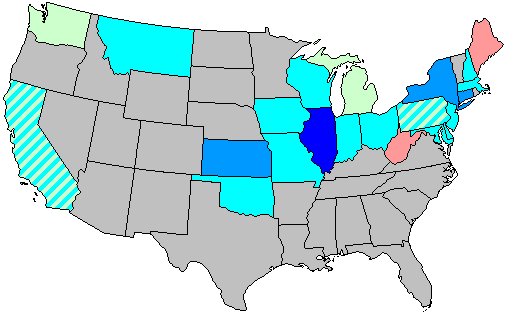
Net gain in party representation (stripes indicate mixed gains): 6+ Democratic gain; 3–5 Democratic gain; 3–5 Republican gain; 1–2 Democratic gain; 1–2 Progressive gain; 1–2 Republican gain; no net change

== Early election dates ==
Two states, with 6 seats between them, held elections early in 1912:

- September 3, 1912: Vermont
- September 9, 1912: Maine

This was the last year that Vermont held early elections.

== Special elections ==
There were five special elections in 1912 to the 57th United States Congress.

Special elections are sorted by date then district.

District	Incumbent			This race	
District	Member	Party	First elected	Results	Candidates
Kansas 7	Edmond H. Madison	Republican	1906	Incumbent died September 18, 1911. New member elected January 9, 1912. Democratic gain.	▌ ✓ George Neeley (Democratic) 48.63%; ▌Frank Martin (Republican) 43.74%; ▌N. L. Amos (Socialist) 5.77%; ▌Harry R. Ross (Prohibition) 1.85%
Pennsylvania 1	Henry H. Bingham	Republican	1878	Incumbent died March 22, 1912. New member elected May 24, 1912. Republican hold.	▌ ✓ William Scott Vare (Republican) 87.76%; ▌Henry V. Garrett (Democratic) 11.85%; ▌Charles L. Hawley (Prohibition) 0.40%
Vermont 1	David J. Foster	Republican	1900	Incumbent died July 30, 1912. New member elected July 30, 1912. Republican hold.	▌ ✓ Frank L. Greene (Republican) 87.3%; ▌George Spargo (Socialist) 11.4%; ▌Patrick Meldon (Democratic) 0.6%
Iowa 11	Elbert H. Hubbard	Republican	1904	Incumbent died June 4, 1912. New member elected November 5, 1912. Republican hold.	▌ ✓ George Cromwell Scott (Republican) 41.05%; ▌Anthony Van Wagenen (Democratic) 36.20%; ▌Joseph W. Hallam (Progressive) 22.76%
New York 26	George R. Malby	Republican	1906	Incumbent died July 5, 1912. New member elected November 5, 1912. Republican hold.	▌ ✓ Edwin Albert Merritt (Republican) 46.87%; ▌Dennis B. Lucey (Democratic) 32.94%; ▌John R. Burnham (Progressive) 20.20%

== Alabama ==
District	Incumbent			This race	
District	Member	Party	First elected	Results	Candidates
Alabama 1	George W. Taylor	Democratic	1896	Incumbent re-elected.	▌ ✓ George W. Taylor (Democratic) 97.2%; ▌W. M. Doyle (Socialist) 2.8%
Alabama 2	S. Hubert Dent Jr.	Democratic	1908	Incumbent re-elected.	▌ ✓ S. Hubert Dent Jr. (Democratic) 100%
Alabama 3	Henry D. Clayton Jr.	Democratic	1896	Incumbent re-elected.	▌ ✓ Henry D. Clayton Jr. (Democratic) 100%
Alabama 4	Fred L. Blackmon	Democratic	1910	Incumbent re-elected.	▌ ✓ Fred L. Blackmon (Democratic) 67.4%; ▌Adolphus P. Longshore (Progressive) 26.6%; ▌W. H. Sturdivant (Republican) 6.0%
Alabama 5	J. Thomas Heflin	Democratic	1904 (special)	Incumbent re-elected.	▌ ✓ J. Thomas Heflin (Democratic) 100%
Alabama 6	Richmond P. Hobson	Democratic	1906	Incumbent re-elected.	▌ ✓ Richmond P. Hobson (Democratic) 82.0%; ▌Charles P. Lunsford (Republican) 18.0%
Alabama 7	John L. Burnett	Democratic	1898	Incumbent re-elected.	▌ ✓ John L. Burnett (Democratic) 54.4%; ▌Sumter Cogswell (Progressive) 30.4%; ▌John J. Stephens (Republican) 15.1%
Alabama 8	William N. Richardson	Democratic	1900 (special)	Incumbent re-elected.	▌ ✓ William N. Richardson (Democratic) 88.4%; ▌William E. Hotchkiss (Republican) 9.5%; ▌W. L. Conner (Socialist) 2.0%
Alabama 9	Oscar Underwood	Democratic	1894 (contested); 1896	Incumbent re-elected.	▌ ✓ Oscar Underwood (Democratic) 88.7%; ▌Frederick B. Parker (Republican) 11.3%
Alabama at-large	None (new district)			New seat. Democratic gain.	▌ ✓ John Abercrombie (Democratic) 87.8%; ▌Asa E. Stratton (Republican) 9.6%; ▌J. C. Maxwell (Socialist) 2.5%

== Arizona ==
Results by county Hayden: 40–50% 50–60%

District	Incumbent			This race	
District	Member	Party	First elected	Results	Candidates
Arizona at-large	Carl Hayden	Democratic	1911	Incumbent re-elected.	▌ ✓ Carl Hayden (Democratic) 48.37%; ▌Robert S. Fisher (Progressive) 24.71%; ▌Thomas Edward Campbell (Republican) 13.21%; ▌A. Charles Smith (Socialist) 12.89%; ▌O. Gibson (Prohibition) 0.82%

== Arkansas ==
District	Incumbent			This race	
District	Member	Party	First elected	Results	Candidates
Arkansas 1	Robert B. Macon	Democratic	1902	Incumbent lost renomination. Democratic hold.	▌ ✓ Thaddeus H. Caraway (Democratic) 100%
Arkansas 2	William A. Oldfield	Democratic	1908	Incumbent re-elected.	▌ ✓ William A. Oldfield (Democratic) 73%; ▌G. W. Wells (Republican) 27%
Arkansas 3	John C. Floyd	Democratic	1904	Incumbent re-elected.	▌ ✓ John C. Floyd (Democratic) 64.57%; ▌J. F. Carlton (Republican) 35.43%
Arkansas 4	William B. Cravens	Democratic	1906	Incumbent retired. Democratic hold.	▌ ✓ Otis Wingo (Democratic) 67.59%; ▌James O. Livesay (Republican) 32.41%
Arkansas 5	Henderson M. Jacoway	Democratic	1910	Incumbent re-elected.	▌ ✓ Henderson M. Jacoway (Democratic) 70.29%; ▌A. C. Remmel (Republican) 29.71%
Arkansas 6	Joseph Taylor Robinson	Democratic	1902	Incumbent retired to run for Arkansas Governor. Democratic hold.	▌ ✓ Samuel M. Taylor (Democratic) 100%
Arkansas 7	William S. Goodwin	Democratic	1910	Incumbent re-elected.	▌ ✓ William S. Goodwin (Democratic) 69.43%; ▌Pat McNalley (Republican) 30.57%

== California ==
District	Incumbent			This race	
District	Member	Party	First elected	Results	Candidates
California 1	William Kent; Redistricted from the 2nd district	Republican	1910	Incumbent re-elected as an independent. Independent gain.	▌ ✓ William Kent (Independent) 37.3%; ▌I. G. Zumwalt (Democratic) 34.4%; ▌Edward H. Hart (Republican) 19.4%; ▌Joseph Bredsteen (Socialist) 9.0%
California 2	John E. Raker; Redistricted from the 1st district	Democratic	1910	Incumbent re-elected.	▌ ✓ John E. Raker (Democratic) 62.64%; ▌Frank M. Rutherford (Republican) 27.17%; ▌J. C. Williams (Socialist) 10.19%
California 3	None (new district)			New seat. Republican gain.	▌ ✓ Charles F. Curry (Republican) 58.8%; ▌Gilbert McMillan Ross (Democratic) 28.8%; ▌William L. Wilson (Socialist) 12.4%
California 4	Julius Kahn	Republican	1898	Incumbent re-elected.	▌ ✓ Julius Kahn (Republican) 56.1%; ▌Bert Schlesinger (Democratic) 32.7%; ▌Norman W. Pendleton (Socialist) 11.2%
California 5	None (new district)			New seat. Republican gain.	▌ ✓ John I. Nolan (Republican) 52.3%; ▌Stephen V. Costello (Democratic) 34.7%; ▌E. L. Reguin (Socialist) 13.0%
California 6	Joseph R. Knowland; Redistricted from the 3rd district	Republican	1904	Incumbent re-elected.	▌ ✓ Joseph R. Knowland (Republican) 53.7%; ▌J. Stitt Wilson (Socialist) 40.0%; ▌Hiram A Luttrell (Democratic) 6.3%
California 7	James C. Needham; Redistricted from the 6th district	Republican	1898	Incumbent lost re-election. Democratic gain.	▌ ✓ Denver S. Church (Democratic) 44.1%; ▌James C. Needham (Republican) 42.6%; ▌J. S. Cato (Socialist) 13.3%
California 8	Everis A. Hayes; Redistricted from the 5th district	Republican	1904	Incumbent re-elected.	▌ ✓ Everis A. Hayes (Republican) 51.0%; ▌James B. Holohan (Democratic) 35.2%; ▌Robert Whitaker (Socialist) 13.9%
California 9	None (new district)			New seat. Progressive gain.	▌ ✓ Charles W. Bell (Progressive) 47.2%; ▌Thomas H. Kirk (Democratic) 23.9%; ▌Ralph L. Criswell (Socialist) 18.2%; ▌George S. Yarnall (Prohibition) 10.7%
California 10	William Stephens; Redistricted from the 7th district	Republican	1910	Incumbent re-elected as a Progressive. Progressive gain.	▌ ✓ William Stephens (Progressive) 53.4%; ▌George Ringo (Democratic) 21.9%; ▌Fred C. Wheeler (Socialist) 21.0%; ▌Emory D. Martindale (Prohibition) 3.7%
California 11	Sylvester C. Smith; Redistricted from the 8th district	Republican	1904	Incumbent retired. Democratic gain. Incumbent died before the Congress ended.	▌ ✓ William Kettner (Democratic) 42.7%; ▌Samuel C. Evans (Republican) 36.8%; ▌Noble A. Richardson (Socialist) 12.1%; ▌Helen M. Stoddard (Prohibition) 8.3%

== Colorado ==
District	Incumbent			This race	
District	Member	Party	First elected	Results	Candidates
Colorado 1	Atterson W. Rucker	Democratic	1908	Incumbent lost renomination. Democratic hold.	▌ ✓ George Kindel (Democratic) 45.8%; ▌W. J. Crank (Progressive) 25.3%; ▌Rice W. Means (Republican) 20.9%; ▌John W. Martin (Socialist) 5.7%; ▌Otto A. Reinhardt (Prohibition) 2.2%
Colorado 2	John A. Martin	Democratic	1908	Incumbent retired. Democratic hold.	▌ ✓ Harry H. Seldomridge (Democratic) 44.3%; ▌Charles A. Ballreich (Republican) 28.7%; ▌Neil N. McLean (Progressive) 19.6%; ▌S. A. Van Buskirk (Socialist) 7.0%
Colorado at-large	None (new seat)			New seat. Democratic gain.	▌ ✓ Edward T. Taylor (Democratic) 22.5%; ▌ ✓ Edward Keating (Democratic) 21.6%; ▌Clarence P. Dodge (Progressive) 12.6%; ▌Samuel H. Kinsley (Republican) 12.4%; ▌Jesse J. Laton (Republican) 12.1%; ▌Charles E. Fisher (Progressive) 11.5%; ▌Unknown (Socialist) 3.1%; ▌F. W. Brainard (Socialist) 3.1%; ▌Samuel S. Stutzman (Prohibition) 1.1%
Colorado at-large	None (new seat)			New seat. Democratic gain.	▌ ✓ Edward T. Taylor (Democratic) 22.5%; ▌ ✓ Edward Keating (Democratic) 21.6%; ▌Clarence P. Dodge (Progressive) 12.6%; ▌Samuel H. Kinsley (Republican) 12.4%; ▌Jesse J. Laton (Republican) 12.1%; ▌Charles E. Fisher (Progressive) 11.5%; ▌Unknown (Socialist) 3.1%; ▌F. W. Brainard (Socialist) 3.1%; ▌Samuel S. Stutzman (Prohibition) 1.1%

== Connecticut ==
District	Incumbent			This race	
District	Member	Party	First elected	Results	Candidates
Connecticut 1	E. Stevens Henry	Republican	1894	Incumbent retired. Democratic gain.	▌ ✓ Augustine Lonergan (Democratic) 40.0%; ▌Charles C. Bissell (Republican) 38.7%; ▌Joseph W. Alsop (Progressive) 14.9%; ▌Arthur B. Beers (Socialist) 4.7%; Others: ▌Duane N. Griffin (Prohibition) 1.0%; ▌Alvis Kumpitsch (Socialist Labor) 0.6%
Connecticut 2	Thomas L. Reilly	Democratic	1910	Incumbent retired to run in the 3rd district. Democratic hold.	▌ ✓ Bryan F. Mahan (Democratic) 41.8%; ▌William A. King (Republican) 40.3%; ▌G. Warren Davis (Progressive) 13.3%; ▌William M. Kellas (Socialist) 3.0%; Others: ▌Charles M. Reed (Prohibition) 1.3%; ▌Otto Ruckser (Socialist Labor) 0.4%
Connecticut 3	Edwin W. Higgins	Republican	1904	Incumbent retired. Democratic gain.	▌ ✓ Thomas L. Reilly (Democratic) 42.7%; ▌John Q. Tilson (Republican) 34.1%; ▌Yandell Henderson (Progressive) 14.4%; ▌William A. Applegate (Socialist) 7.0%; Others: ▌Edward A. Richards (Prohibition) 1.1%; ▌Christian Frosch (Socialist Labor) 0.9%
Connecticut 3	John Q. Tilson; Redistricted from the at-large district	Republican	1908	Incumbent lost re-election. Republican loss.	▌ ✓ Thomas L. Reilly (Democratic) 42.7%; ▌John Q. Tilson (Republican) 34.1%; ▌Yandell Henderson (Progressive) 14.4%; ▌William A. Applegate (Socialist) 7.0%; Others: ▌Edward A. Richards (Prohibition) 1.1%; ▌Christian Frosch (Socialist Labor) 0.9%
Connecticut 4	Ebenezer J. Hill	Republican	1894	Incumbent lost re-election. Democratic gain.	▌ ✓ Jeremiah Donovan (Democratic) 37.6%; ▌Ebenezer J. Hill (Republican) 34.1%; ▌Samuel E. Vincent (Progressive) 19.9%; ▌Robert Hunter (Socialist) 6.9%; Others: ▌G. Whitfield Simonson (Prohibition) 1.0%; ▌Harold Pederson (Socialist Labor) 0.6%
Connecticut 5	None (new district)			New seat. Democratic gain.	▌ ✓ William Kennedy (Democratic) 39.2%; ▌Thomas D. Bradstreet (Republican) 38.0%; ▌Horace G. Hoadley (Progressive) 15.6%; ▌Ernest D. Hull (Socialist) 6.2%; ▌John B. Davidson (Prohibition) 1.0%

== Delaware ==
District	Incumbent			This race	
District	Member	Party	First elected	Results	Candidates
Delaware at-large	William H. Heald	Republican	1908	Incumbent retired. Democratic gain.	▌ ✓ Franklin Brockson (Democratic) 46.16%; ▌George Hall (Republican) 34.37%; ▌Hiram R. Burton (National Progressive) 11.29%; ▌Louis A. Drexler (Progressive) 5.80%; ▌John H. Kelly (Prohibition) 1.23%; ▌Edward Norton (Socialist) 1.16%

== Florida ==
District	Incumbent			This race	
District	Member	Party	First elected	Results	Candidates
Florida 1	Stephen M. Sparkman	Democratic	1894	Incumbent re-elected.	▌ ✓ Stephen M. Sparkman (Democratic) 78.5%; ▌C. C. Allen (Socialist) 12.0%; ▌George W. Beall (Republican) 4.9%; ▌J. D. Hazzard (Progressive) 3.0%; ▌George C. Kelley (Prohibition) 1.6%
Florida 2	Frank Clark	Democratic	1904	Incumbent re-elected.	▌ ✓ Frank Clark (Democratic) 81.1%; ▌J. J. Collins (Socialist) 7.3%; ▌John W. Howell (Republican) 6.7%; ▌C. E. Speir (Progressive) 4.9%
Florida 3	Dannite H. Mays	Democratic	1908	Incumbent lost renomination. Democratic hold.	▌ ✓ Emmett Wilson (Democratic) 86.4%; ▌W. M. Lamberry (Socialist) 6.3%; ▌Thomas F. McGourin (Republican) 4.7%; ▌John T. Poder (Progressive) 2.7%
Florida at-large	None (New seat)			New seat. Democratic gain.	▌ ✓ Claude L'Engle (Democratic) 77.4%; ▌A. N. Jackson (Socialist) 8.2%; ▌George W. Allen (Republican) 6.6%; ▌E. R. Gunby (Progressive) 6.0%; ▌Frances P. Coffin (Prohibition) 1.8%

== Georgia ==
District	Incumbent			This race	
District	Member	Party	First elected	Results	Candidates
Georgia 1	Charles G. Edwards	Democratic	1906	Incumbent re-elected.	▌ ✓ Charles G. Edwards (Democratic) 95.71%; ▌E. J. Seymour (Republican) 4.29%
Georgia 2	Seaborn Roddenbery	Democratic	1910	Incumbent re-elected.	▌ ✓ Seaborn Roddenbery (Democratic) 100%
Georgia 3	Dudley M. Hughes	Democratic	1908	Incumbent ran in the 12th district. Democratic hold.	▌ ✓ Charles R. Crisp (Democratic) 100%
Georgia 4	William C. Adamson	Democratic	1896	Incumbent re-elected.	▌ ✓ William C. Adamson (Democratic) 100%
Georgia 5	William S. Howard	Democratic	1910	Incumbent re-elected.	▌ ✓ William S. Howard (Democratic) 100%
Georgia 6	Charles L. Bartlett	Democratic	1894	Incumbent re-elected.	▌ ✓ Charles L. Bartlett (Democratic) 100%
Georgia 7	Gordon Lee	Democratic	1904	Incumbent re-elected.	▌ ✓ Gordon Lee (Democratic) 100%
Georgia 8	Samuel J. Tribble	Independent; Democratic	1910	Incumbent re-elected.	▌ ✓ Samuel J. Tribble (Democratic) 100%
Georgia 9	Thomas M. Bell	Democratic	1904	Incumbent re-elected.	▌ ✓ Thomas M. Bell (Democratic) 100%
Georgia 10	Thomas W. Hardwick	Democratic	1902	Incumbent re-elected.	▌ ✓ Thomas W. Hardwick (Democratic) 100%
Georgia 11	William G. Brantley	Democratic	1896	Incumbent retired. Democratic hold.	▌ ✓ John R. Walker (Democratic) 100%
Georgia 12	None (New district)			New district. Democratic gain.	▌ ✓ Dudley M. Hughes (Democratic) 100%

== Idaho ==
District	Incumbent			This race	
District	Member	Party	First elected	Results	Candidates
Idaho at-large 2 seats on a general ticket	Burton L. French	Republican	1910	Incumbent re-elected.	▌ ✓ Burton L. French (Republican) 27.52%; ▌ ✓ Addison T. Smith (Republican) 22.40%; ▌Perry W. Mitchell (Democratic) 15.51%; ▌Edward M. Pugmire (Democratic) 15.45%; ▌P. Monroe Smock (Progressive) 6.20%; ▌G. W. Belloit (Socialist) 5.86%; ▌Edward L. Rigg (Socialist) 5.86%; ▌John Tucker (Prohibition) 0.61%; ▌Jonathan G. Carrick (Prohibition) 0.60%
Idaho at-large 2 seats on a general ticket	None (New seat)			New seat. Republican gain.	▌ ✓ Burton L. French (Republican) 27.52%; ▌ ✓ Addison T. Smith (Republican) 22.40%; ▌Perry W. Mitchell (Democratic) 15.51%; ▌Edward M. Pugmire (Democratic) 15.45%; ▌P. Monroe Smock (Progressive) 6.20%; ▌G. W. Belloit (Socialist) 5.86%; ▌Edward L. Rigg (Socialist) 5.86%; ▌John Tucker (Prohibition) 0.61%; ▌Jonathan G. Carrick (Prohibition) 0.60%

== Illinois ==
District	Incumbent			This race	
District	Member	Party	First elected	Results	Candidates
Illinois 1	Martin B. Madden	Republican	1904	Incumbent re-elected.	▌ ✓ Martin B. Madden (Republican) 52.2%; ▌Andrew Donovan (Democratic) 38.2%; ▌William F. Barnard (Socialist) 8.5%; ▌W. H. Rogers (Prohibition) 1.2%
Illinois 2	James Robert Mann	Republican	1896	Incumbent re-elected.	▌ ✓ James Robert Mann (Republican) 37.37%; ▌John Charles Vaughan (Democratic) 27.8%; ▌Thomas D. Knight (Progressive) 26.3%; ▌John C. Flora (Socialist) 8.1%; ▌Edgar T. Lee (Prohibition) 0.6%
Illinois 3	William W. Wilson	Republican	1902	Incumbent lost re-election. Democratic gain.	▌ ✓ George E. Gorman (Democratic) 33.2%; ▌William W. Wilson (Republican) 28.8%; ▌Franklin P. Simons (Progressive) 26.6%; ▌George H. Gibson (Socialist) 10.4%; ▌William H. Dietz (Prohibition) 1.0%
Illinois 4	James T. McDermott	Democratic	1906	Incumbent re-elected.	▌ ✓ James T. McDermott (Democratic) 57.5%; ▌Charles J. Tomkiewicz (Republican) 24.6%; ▌Carl F. Gauger (Socialist) 18.1%
Illinois 5	Adolph J. Sabath	Democratic	1906	Incumbent re-elected.	▌ ✓ Adolph J. Sabath (Democratic) 51.8%; ▌Jacob Gartenstein (Republican) 19.5%; ▌Charles Toepper (Socialist) 15.6%; ▌Louis H. Clusmann (Progressive) 13.1%
Illinois 6	Edmund J. Stack	Democratic	1906	Incumbent lost renomination. Democratic hold.	▌ ✓ James McAndrews (Democratic) 45.3%; ▌Arthur W. Fulton (Republican) 38.2%; ▌John Will (Socialist) 15.6%; ▌J. W. Troeger (Prohibition) 0.9%
Illinois 7	Frank Buchanan	Democratic	1906	Incumbent re-elected.	▌ ✓ Frank Buchanan (Democratic) 28.19%; ▌Elton C. Armitage (Progressive) 27.3%; ▌Niels Juul (Republican) 22.1%; ▌Otto C. Christensen (Socialist) 21.8%; ▌E. H. Parkinson (Prohibition) 0.6%
Illinois 8	Thomas Gallagher	Democratic	1908	Incumbent re-elected.	▌ ✓ Thomas Gallagher (Democratic) 52.4%; ▌William G. Herrmann (Republican) 29.0%; ▌N. F. Holm (Socialist) 17.6%; ▌John Nelson (Prohibition) 1.0%
Illinois 9	Lynden Evans	Democratic	1910	Incumbent lost re-election. Republican gain.	▌ ✓ Frederick A. Britten (Republican) 34.6%; ▌Lynden Evans (Democratic) 30.3%; ▌C. O. Ludlow (Progressive) 22.5%; ▌Frank Shiflersmith (Socialist) 11.8%; Others: ▌Herbert V. Lyon (Prohibition) 0.7%; ▌Hugh F. McGovern (Independent) 0.2%
Illinois 10	George E. Foss	Republican	1894	Incumbent lost re-election. Progressive gain.	▌ ✓ Charles M. Thomson (Progressive) 35.2%; ▌George E. Foss (Republican) 29.0%; ▌Frank L. Fowler (Democratic) 26.0%; ▌Charles E. Larson (Socialist) 8.9%; ▌Dudley Grant Hays (Prohibition) 0.8%
Illinois 11	Ira C. Copley	Republican	1910	Incumbent re-elected.	▌ ✓ Ira C. Copley (Republican) 61.1%; ▌Thomas H. Riley (Democratic) 34.0%; ▌P. H. Murray (Socialist) 2.8%; ▌William P. Lea (Prohibition) 2.1%
Illinois 12	Charles E. Fuller	Republican	1902	Incumbent lost re-election. Progressive gain.	▌ ✓ William H. Hinebaugh (Progressive) 36.4%; ▌Charles E. Fuller (Republican) 33.6%; ▌Jacob W. Rausch (Democratic) 24.3%; ▌Joseph McCabe (Socialist) 4.3%; ▌C. W. Earl (Prohibition) 1.4%
Illinois 13	John C. McKenzie	Republican	1910	Incumbent re-elected.	▌ ✓ John C. McKenzie (Republican) 36.5%; ▌I. F. Edwards (Progressive) 30.1%; ▌Ray Rariden (Democratic) 29.7%; Others: ▌William Beers (Prohibition) 2.1%; ▌Clarence C. Brooks (Socialist) 1.6%
Illinois 14	James McKinney	Republican	1905	Incumbent retired. Democratic gain.	▌ ✓ Clyde H. Tavenner (Democratic) 47.3%; ▌Charles J. Searle (Republican) 44.0%; ▌Charles Block (Socialist) 6.9%; ▌Parkhurst W. Cutler (Prohibition) 1.9%
Illinois 15	George W. Prince	Republican	1895	Incumbent lost re-election. Democratic gain.	▌ ✓ Stephen A. Hoxworth (Democratic) 35.8%; ▌Charles F. Kincheloe (Progressive) 31.7%; ▌George W. Prince (Republican) 25.1%; ▌John C. Sjodin (Socialist) 5.5%; ▌Paul D. Ransom (Prohibition) 1.9%
Illinois 16	Claude U. Stone	Democratic	1910	Incumbent re-elected.	▌ ✓ Claude U. Stone (Democratic) 45.7%; ▌William E. Cadmus (Progressive) 27.6%; ▌Frederick H. Smith (Republican) 20.3%; ▌Rudolf Pfeiffer (Socialist) 5.4%; ▌George W. Warner (Prohibition) 1.1%
Illinois 17	John A. Sterling	Republican	1902	Incumbent lost re-election. Democratic gain.	▌ ✓ Louis FitzHenry (Democratic) 38.0%; ▌John A. Sterling (Republican) 34.5%; ▌George E. Stump (Progressive) 23.6%; Others: ▌E. J. Brais (Socialist) 2.1%; ▌Robert Means (Prohibition) 1.8%
Illinois 18	Joseph G. Cannon	Republican	1872	Incumbent lost re-election. Democratic gain.	▌ ✓ Frank T. O'Hair (Democratic) 38.9%; ▌Joseph G. Cannon (Republican) 37.3%; ▌E. F. Royse (Progressive) 19.0%; ▌Clay Freeman Gaumer (Prohibition) 2.6%; ▌John H. Walker (Socialist) 2.3%
Illinois 19	William B. McKinley	Republican	1904	Incumbent lost re-election. Democratic gain.	▌ ✓ Charles M. Borchers (Democratic) 40.2%; ▌William B. McKinley (Republican) 37.4%; ▌John H. Chadwick (Progressive) 19.5%; Others: ▌Charles E. Peebles (Socialist) 1.5%; ▌Thomas C. Eiler (Prohibition) 1.4%
Illinois 20	Henry T. Rainey	Democratic	1902	Incumbent re-elected.	▌ ✓ Henry T. Rainey (Democratic) 54.1%; ▌E. E. Brass (Republican) 24.2%; ▌B. O. Aylesworth (Progressive) 17.9%; Others: ▌Jesse Morgan (Socialist) 2.0%; ▌Charles P. Corson (Prohibition) 1.8%
Illinois 21	James M. Graham	Democratic	1908	Incumbent re-elected.	▌ ✓ James M. Graham (Democratic) 46.8%; ▌H. Clay Wilson (Republican) 29.7%; ▌Robert Johns (Progressive) 16.0%; ▌Herman Rahm (Socialist) 5.6%; ▌Lewis F. Denton (Prohibition) 1.9%
Illinois 22	William A. Rodenberg	Republican	1898	Incumbent lost re-election. Democratic gain.	▌ ✓ William N. Baltz (Democratic) 43.5%; ▌William A. Rodenberg (Republican) 36.6%; ▌Utten S. Nixon (Progressive) 10.6%; ▌William C. Pierce (Socialist) 8.1%; ▌Andrew J. Meek (Prohibition) 1.3%
Illinois 23	Martin D. Foster	Democratic	1904	Incumbent re-elected.	▌ ✓ Martin D. Foster (Democratic) 52.4%; ▌Robert B. Clark (Republican) 25.0%; ▌George W. Jones (Progressive) 17.7%; ▌John L. McKittrick (Socialist) 2.8%; ▌John W. Honey (Prohibition) 2.2%
Illinois 24	H. Robert Fowler	Democratic	1910	Incumbent re-elected.	▌ ✓ H. Robert Fowler (Democratic) 47.7%; ▌James B. Blackman (Republican) 36.1%; ▌A. J. Gibbons (Progressive) 12.3%; Others: ▌T. C. Mason (Socialist) 2.3%; ▌Thomas J. Scott (Prohibition) 1.6%
Illinois 25	Napoleon B. Thistlewood	Republican	1908	Incumbent lost re-election. Democratic gain.	▌ ✓ Robert P. Hill (Democratic) 43.3%; ▌Napoleon B. Thistlewood (Republican) 36.2%; ▌Robert T. Cook (Progressive) 14.2%; ▌Paul H. Castle (Socialist) 4.5%; ▌Charles F. Stalker (Prohibition) 1.9%
Illinois at-large 2 seats on a general ticket	None (new seat)			New seat. Democratic gain.	▌ ✓ Lawrence B. Stringer (Democratic) 18.4%; ▌ ✓ William E. Williams (Democratic) 17.8%; ▌William E. Mason (Republican) 13.9%; ▌Lawrence P. Boyle (Progressive) 13.8%; ▌B. M. Maxey (Progressive) 13.5%; ▌Walter Huggins (Socialist) 3.7%; ▌D. L. Thomas (Socialist) 3.7%; Others: ▌Walter H. Harris (Prohibition) 0.7%; ▌James H. Shaw (Prohibition) 0.7%; ▌George Martin (Socialist Labor) 0.2%; ▌Joseph Fenyves (Socialist Labor) 0.2%
Illinois at-large 2 seats on a general ticket	None (new seat)			New seat. Democratic gain.	▌ ✓ Lawrence B. Stringer (Democratic) 18.4%; ▌ ✓ William E. Williams (Democratic) 17.8%; ▌William E. Mason (Republican) 13.9%; ▌Lawrence P. Boyle (Progressive) 13.8%; ▌B. M. Maxey (Progressive) 13.5%; ▌Walter Huggins (Socialist) 3.7%; ▌D. L. Thomas (Socialist) 3.7%; Others: ▌Walter H. Harris (Prohibition) 0.7%; ▌James H. Shaw (Prohibition) 0.7%; ▌George Martin (Socialist Labor) 0.2%; ▌Joseph Fenyves (Socialist Labor) 0.2%

== Indiana ==
District	Incumbent			This race	
District	Member	Party	First elected	Results	Candidates
Indiana 1	John W. Boehne	Democratic	1908	Incumbent retired. Democratic hold.	▌ ✓ Charles Lieb (Democratic) 45.65%; ▌D. H. Ortmeyer (Republican) 30.01%; ▌Humphrey C. Heldt (Progressive) 13.74%; ▌William H. Rainey (Socialist) 8.52%; ▌George E. Flanagan (Prohibition) 2.08%
Indiana 2	William A. Cullop	Democratic	1908	Incumbent re-elected.	▌ ✓ William A. Cullop (Democratic) 45.34%; ▌Oscar E. Bland (Republican) 32.56%; ▌John N. Dyer (Progressive) 12.32%; ▌John L. Shepherd (Socialist) 7.98%; ▌Isaac C. Overman (Prohibition) 1.79%
Indiana 3	William E. Cox	Democratic	1908	Incumbent re-elected.	▌ ✓ William E. Cox (Democratic) 51.52%; ▌William D. Barnes (Republican) 22.36%; ▌S. G. Wilkinson (Progressive) 22.27%; ▌John Zahnd (Socialist) 2.65%; ▌H. W. White (Prohibition) 1.2%
Indiana 4	Lincoln Dixon	Democratic	1904	Incumbent re-elected.	▌ ✓ Lincoln Dixon (Democratic) 52.42%; ▌Rollin A. Turner (Republican) 26.88%; ▌Charles Zoller (Progressive) 16.3%; ▌Henry A. Thompson (Prohibition) 2.24%; ▌William Carmichael (Socialist) 2.16%
Indiana 5	Ralph W. Moss	Democratic	1908	Incumbent re-elected.	▌ ✓ Ralph W. Moss (Democratic) 45.16%; ▌F. W. Blankenlaker (Republican) 26.25%; ▌Joseph W. Amis (Socialist) 18.1%; ▌William Houston (Progressive) 7.33%; ▌John Myers (Prohibition) 3.16%
Indiana 6	Finly H. Gray	Democratic	1910	Incumbent re-elected.	▌ ✓ Finly H. Gray (Democratic) 43.9%; ▌William L. Risk (Republican) 24.69%; ▌Gierluf Jansen (Progressive) 23.71%; ▌R. Foster Van Voorhis (Socialist) 4.68%; ▌Mercer Brown (Prohibition) 3.03%
Indiana 7	Charles A. Korbly	Democratic	1908	Incumbent re-elected.	▌ ✓ Charles A. Korbly (Democratic) 42.81%; ▌Joseph V. Zartman (Progressive) 27.26%; ▌Thomas R. Shipp (Republican) 19.73%; ▌Frank J. Hays (Socialist) 8.15%; ▌Albert Stanley (Prohibition) 2.05%
Indiana 8	John A. M. Adair	Democratic	1906	Incumbent re-elected.	▌ ✓ John A. M. Adair (Democratic) 46.48%; ▌Edward C. Toner (Progressive) 25.99%; ▌J. P. Watts (Republican) 16.39%; ▌Hunter McDonald (Socialist) 7.13%; ▌Jacob Walter Gibson (Prohibition) 4.02%
Indiana 9	Martin A. Morrison	Democratic	1906	Incumbent re-elected.	▌ ✓ Martin A. Morrison (Democratic) 45.12%; ▌J. P. Watts (Republican) 30.43%; ▌John F. Neil (Progressive) 17.62%; ▌George N. Keller (Socialist) 3.85%; ▌A. W. Ewing (Prohibition) 2.99%
Indiana 10	Edgar D. Crumpacker	Republican	1896	Incumbent lost re-election. Democratic gain.	▌ ✓ John B. Peterson (Democratic) 38.78%; ▌Edgar D. Crumpacker (Republican) 36.45%; ▌John O. Bowers (Progressive) 20.64%; ▌A. K. Mark (Socialist) 2.89%; ▌William R. Harkrider (Prohibition) 1.25%
Indiana 11	George W. Rauch	Democratic	1906	Incumbent re-elected.	▌ ✓ George W. Rauch (Democratic) 43.8%; ▌John W. Stewart (Republican) 24.44%; ▌Edgar M. Baldwin (Progressive) 21.67%; ▌Ernest Malott (Socialist) 5.63%; ▌Edward H. Kennedy (Prohibition) 4.47%
Indiana 12	Cyrus Cline	Democratic	1906	Incumbent re-elected.	▌ ✓ Cyrus Cline (Democratic) 46.89%; ▌Charles R. Lane (Republican) 37.92%; ▌H. M. Widney (Progressive) 10.02%; ▌William Dibble (Socialist) 3.19%; ▌Jacob G. Wise (Prohibition) 1.99%
Indiana 13	Henry A. Barnhart	Democratic	1908	Incumbent re-elected.	▌ ✓ Henry A. Barnhart (Democratic) 43.91%; ▌R. Clarence Stephens (Progressive) 24.31%; ▌Charles A. Carlisle (Republican) 24.25%; ▌Ervin H. Cady (Socialist) 5.17%; ▌William Warner (Prohibition) 2.36%

== Iowa ==
District	Incumbent			This race	
District	Member	Party	First elected	Results	Candidates
Iowa 1	Charles A. Kennedy	Republican	1906	Incumbent re-elected.	▌ ✓ Charles A. Kennedy (Republican) 42.14%; ▌Joshua F. Elder (Democratic) 36.03%; ▌Joe Crail (Progressive) 19.21%; ▌Frank Kubisch (Socialist) 2.62%
Iowa 2	Irvin S. Pepper	Democratic	1910	Incumbent re-elected.	▌ ✓ Irvin S. Pepper (Democratic) 85.71%; ▌Michael T. Kennedy (Socialist) 10.99%; ▌Charles C. Bacon (Prohibition)
Iowa 3	Charles E. Pickett	Republican	1908	Incumbent lost re-election. Democratic gain.	▌ ✓ Maurice Connolly (Democratic) 42.34%; ▌Charles E. Pickett (Republican) 39.55%; ▌Robert E. Leach (Progressive) 14.46%; ▌D. S. Cameron (Socialist) 2.07%; ▌S. D. Kennedy (Prohibition) 1.58%
Iowa 4	Gilbert N. Haugen	Republican	1898	Incumbent re-elected.	▌ ✓ Gilbert N. Haugen (Republican) 52.61%; ▌G. A. Meyer (Democratic) 44.48%; ▌James S. Mott (Socialist) 1.89%; ▌Thomas McElroy (Prohibition) 1.01%
Iowa 5	Gilbert N. Haugen	Republican	1908	Incumbent re-elected.	▌ ✓ James W. Good (Republican) 47.7%; ▌S. C. Huber (Democratic) 44.2%; ▌Fred A. Niles (Progressive) 4.69%; ▌Louis N. Nock (Socialist) 2.11%; ▌F. J. Thomas (Prohibition) 1.31%
Iowa 6	Nathan E. Kendall	Republican	1908	Incumbent renominated but withdrew prior to election. Democratic gain.	▌ ✓ Sanford Kirkpatrick (Democratic) 42.47%; ▌M. A. McCord (Republican) 39.28%; ▌John H. Patton (Progressive) 12.39%; ▌Andrew Engle (Socialist) 5.87%
Iowa 7	Solomon F. Prouty	Republican	1908	Incumbent re-elected.	▌ ✓ Solomon F. Prouty (Republican) 43.16%; ▌Clint L. Price (Democratic) 34.78%; ▌George C. White (Progressive) 14.69%; ▌Andy Swanson (Socialist) 4.84%; ▌Ira D. Kellogg (Prohibition) 2.54%
Iowa 8	Horace M. Towner	Republican	1910	Incumbent re-elected.	▌ ✓ Horace M. Towner (Republican) 49.21%; ▌V. R. McGinnis (Democratic) 41.26%; ▌Lawrence W. Laughlin (Progressive) 7.21%; ▌S. D. Mercer (Socialist) 2.32%
Iowa 9	William R. Green	Republican	1911	Incumbent re-elected.	▌ ✓ William R. Green (Republican) 53.26%; ▌Orris Mosher (Democratic) 43.53%; ▌Arthur C. Kelly (Socialist) 2.34%; ▌W. B. Crewdson (Prohibition) .88%
Iowa 10	Frank P. Woods	Republican	1908	Incumbent re-elected.	▌ ✓ Frank P. Woods (Republican) 53.92%; ▌Nelson L. Rood (Democratic) 32.53%; ▌Sheppard B. Philpot (Progressive) 11.21%; ▌A. E. Moxley (Socialist) 2.34%
Iowa 11	Elbert H. Hubbard	Republican	1908	Incumbent died June 4, 1912. Republican hold.	▌ ✓ George Cromwell Scott (Republican) 40.09%; ▌Anthony Van Wagenen (Democratic) 34.9%; ▌Joseph W. Hallam (Progressive) 22.46%; ▌John W. Bennett (Socialist) 1.75%; ▌A. Jamieson (Prohibition) 0.8%

== Kansas ==
District	Incumbent			This race	
District	Member	Party	First elected	Results	Candidates
Kansas 1	Daniel R. Anthony Jr.	Republican	1907 (Special)	Incumbent re-elected.	▌ ✓ Daniel R. Anthony Jr. (Republican) 51.76%; ▌J. B. Chapman (Democratic) 46.51%; ▌H. B. Conwell (Socialist) 1.73%
Kansas 2	Joseph Taggart	Democratic	1911 (Special)	Incumbent re-elected.	▌ ✓ Joseph Taggart (Democratic) 50.13%; ▌J. L. Brady (Republican) 42.68%; ▌R. S. Thomas (Socialist) 7.19%
Kansas 3	Philip P. Campbell	Republican	1902	Incumbent re-elected.	▌ ✓ Philip P. Campbell (Republican) 38.95%; ▌Francis M. Brady (Democratic) 37.41%; ▌George D. Brewer (Socialist) 23.65%
Kansas 4	Fred S. Jackson	Republican	1910	Incumbent lost re-election. Democratic gain.	▌ ✓ Dudley Doolittle (Democratic) 48.55%; ▌Fred S. Jackson (Republican) 47.07%; ▌S. W. Beach (Socialist) 4.38%
Kansas 5	Rollin R. Rees	Republican	1910	Incumbent lost re-election. Democratic gain.	▌ ✓ Guy T. Helvering (Democratic) 49.76%; ▌Rollin R. Rees (Republican) 45.91%; ▌Grant Chapin (Socialist) 4.33%
Kansas 6	Isaac D. Young	Republican	1910	Incumbent lost re-election. Democratic gain.	▌ ✓ John R. Connelly (Democratic) 47.99%; ▌Isaac D. Young (Republican) 45.63%; ▌Daniel W. Stoner (Socialist) 5.03%; ▌James K. Land (Prohibition) 1.35%
Kansas 7	George A. Neeley	Democratic	1912 (special)	Incumbent re-elected.	▌ ✓ George A. Neeley (Democratic) 51.26%; ▌Gordon L. Finley (Republican) 42.53%; ▌N. L. Amos (Socialist) 5.55%; ▌Harry R. Ross (Prohibition) 0.66%
Kansas 8	Victor Murdock	Republican	1903	Incumbent re-elected.	▌ ✓ Victor Murdock (Republican) 53.37%; ▌John I. Saunders (Democratic) 43.06%; ▌George Burnett (Socialist) 3.57%

== Kentucky ==
District	Incumbent			This race	
District	Member	Party	First elected	Results	Candidates
Kentucky 1	Ollie Murray James	Democratic	1902	Incumbent retired to run for U.S. Senator. Democratic Hold	▌ ✓ Alben W. Barkley (Democratic) 64.47%; ▌Charles Furgeson (Republican) 30.43%; ▌I. O. Ford (Socialist) 5.1%
Kentucky 2	Augustus O. Stanley	Democratic	1902	Incumbent re-elected.	▌ ✓ Augustus O. Stanley (Democratic) 71.26%; ▌L. R. Fox (Progressive) 23.47%; ▌Carr Hawkins (Socialist) 5.28%
Kentucky 3	Robert Y. Thomas Jr.	Democratic	1908	Incumbent re-elected.	▌ ✓ Robert Y. Thomas Jr. (Democratic) 47.91%; ▌Thurman B. Dixon (Republican) 29.40%; ▌J. D. Duncan (Progressive) 19.55%; ▌E. L. Davenport (Socialist) 3.13%
Kentucky 4	Ben Johnson	Democratic	1906	Incumbent re-elected.	▌ ✓ Ben Johnson (Democratic) 53.22%; ▌E. R. Bassett (Progressive) 28.59%; ▌John C. Thompson (Republican) 16.12%; ▌A. Logsdon (Socialist) 2.07%
Kentucky 5	J. Swagar Sherley	Democratic	1902	Incumbent re-elected.	▌ ✓ J. Swagar Sherley (Democratic) 46.15%; ▌Henry I. Fox (Progressive) 43.02%; ▌E. J. Ashcraft (Republican) 7.12%; ▌Charles Dobbs (Socialist) 2.78%; ▌John H. Arnold (Socialist Labor) 0.94%
Kentucky 6	Arthur B. Rouse	Democratic	1910	Incumbent re-elected.	▌ ✓ Arthur B. Rouse (Democratic) 57.26%; ▌D. B. Wallace (Republican) 20.08%; ▌J. G. Blackburn (Progressive) 15.78%; ▌M. A. Brinkman (Socialist) 6.89%
Kentucky 7	J. Campbell Cantrill	Democratic	1908	Incumbent re-elected.	▌ ✓ J. Campbell Cantrill (Democratic) 80.82%; ▌J. G. Blackburn (Progressive) 19.18%
Kentucky 8	Harvey Helm	Democratic	1906	Incumbent re-elected.	▌ ✓ Harvey Helm (Democratic) 71.01%; ▌J. W. Dinsmore (Progressive) 28.99%
Kentucky 9	William J. Fields	Democratic	1910	Incumbent re-elected.	▌ ✓ William J. Fields (Democratic) 50.7%; ▌Harry Bailey (Republican) 30.71%; ▌E. S. Hutchins (Progressive) 16.46%; ▌James A. Williams (Socialist) 2.12%
Kentucky 10	John W. Langley	Republican	1906	Incumbent re-elected.	▌ ✓ John W. Langley (Republican) 69.77%; ▌W. T. Stafford (Progressive) 30.23%
Kentucky 11	Caleb Powers	Republican	1910	Incumbent re-elected.	▌ ✓ Caleb Powers (Republican) 46.43%; ▌Ben V. Smith (Democratic) 29.47%; ▌H. Seavey (Progressive) 22.66%; ▌M. O. Jackson (Socialist) 1.45%

== Louisiana ==
District	Incumbent			This race	
District	Member	Party	First elected	Results	Candidates
Louisiana 1	Albert Estopinal	Democratic	1908	Incumbent re-elected.	▌ ✓ Albert Estopinal (Democratic) 100%
Louisiana 2	H. Garland Dupré	Democratic	1910	Incumbent re-elected.	▌ ✓ H. Garland Dupré (Democratic) 100%
Louisiana 3	Robert F. Broussard	Democratic	1896	Incumbent re-elected.	▌ ✓ Robert F. Broussard (Democratic) 100%
Louisiana 4	John T. Watkins	Democratic	1904	Incumbent re-elected.	▌ ✓ John T. Watkins (Democratic) 93.53%; ▌Lee Norris (Socialist) 6.47%
Louisiana 5	Joseph E. Ransdell	Democratic	1900	Incumbent retired to run for Senate. Democratic hold.	▌ ✓ James Walter Elder (Democratic) 100%
Louisiana 6	Lewis L. Morgan	Democratic	1912	Incumbent re-elected.	▌ ✓ Lewis L. Morgan (Democratic) 100%
Louisiana 7	Arsène Pujo	Democratic	1902	Incumbent retired. Democratic hold.	▌ ✓ Ladislas Lazaro (Democratic) 87.39%; ▌Otis Putnam (Socialist) 12.61%
Louisiana 8	None (New district)			New district. Democratic gain.	▌ ✓ James B. Aswell (Democratic) 77.68%; ▌J. R. Jones (Socialist) 22.33%

== Maine ==
District	Incumbent			This race	
District	Member	Party	First elected	Results	Candidates
Maine 1	Asher Hinds	Republican	1910	Incumbent re-elected.	▌ ✓ Asher Hinds (Republican) 51.72%; ▌Michael T. O'Brien (Democratic) 45.69%; ▌Israel Albert (Socialist) 1.36%
Maine 2	Daniel J. McGillicuddy	Democratic	1910	Incumbent re-elected.	▌ ✓ Daniel J. McGillicuddy (Democratic) 50.37%; ▌W. B. Skelton (Republican) 46.8%; ▌Walter R. Barlow (Socialist) 2.14%
Maine 3	Samuel W. Gould	Democratic	1910	Incumbent lost re-election. Republican gain.	▌ ✓ Forrest Goodwin (Republican) 49.88%; ▌Samuel W. Gould (Democratic) 47.83%; ▌Zenas L. Putnam (Socialist) 1.66%; ▌Samuel F. Emerson (Prohibition) 0.62%
Maine 4	Frank E. Guernsey	Republican	1908	Incumbent re-elected.	▌ ✓ Frank E. Guernsey (Republican) 54.36%; ▌Charles Mullen (Democratic) 45.01%; ▌William A. Rideout (Prohibition) 0.63%

== Maryland ==
District	Incumbent			This race	
District	Member	Party	First elected	Results	Candidates
Maryland 1	James Harry Covington	Democratic	1908	Incumbent re-elected.	▌ ✓ J. Harry Covington (Democratic) 85.2%; ▌Robert D. Grier (Progressive) 11.2%; ▌Charles M. Elderdice (Prohibition) 3.6%
Maryland 2	J. Frederick C. Talbott	Democratic	1902	Incumbent re-elected.	▌ ✓ J. Frederick C. Talbott (Democratic) 59.9%; ▌Laban Sparks (Republican) 37.2%; ▌Basil W. Bowman (Prohibition) 1.8%; ▌Martin O. Huttman (Socialist) 1.2%
Maryland 3	George Konig	Democratic	1910	Incumbent re-elected.	▌ ✓ George Konig (Democratic) 54.7%; ▌Charles W. Main (Republican) 39.9%; ▌Charles F. Krant (Socialist) 3.5%; ▌Edwin B. Fenby (Prohibition) 2.0%
Maryland 4	J. Charles Linthicum	Democratic	1910	Incumbent re-elected.	▌ ✓ J. Charles Linthicum (Democratic) 60.8%; ▌Jacob F. Murbach (Republican) 35.9%; ▌Charles E. Develin (Socialist) 1.9%; ▌Alfred S. Day (Prohibition) 1.3%
Maryland 5	Thomas Parran	Republican	1910	Incumbent lost re-election. Democratic gain.	▌ ✓ Frank Owens Smith (Democratic) 48.9%; ▌Thomas Parran (Republican) 45.5%; ▌Mark Jackson (Socialist) 4.2%; ▌Holin D. Todd (Prohibition) 1.4%
Maryland 6	David John Lewis	Democratic	1910	Incumbent re-elected.	▌ ✓ David John Lewis (Democratic) 56.0%; ▌Charles D. Wagaman (Republican) 38.8%; ▌Sylvester L. V. Young (Socialist) 3.6%; ▌William L. Purdum (Prohibition) 1.6%

== Massachusetts ==
District	Incumbent			This race	
District	Member	Party	First elected	Results	Candidates
Massachusetts 1	George P. Lawrence	Republican	1897 (special)	Incumbent retired. Republican hold.	▌ ✓ Allen T. Treadway (Republican) 42.8%; ▌Richard J. Morrissey (Democratic) 40.0%; ▌Samuel P. Blagden (Progressive) 12.9%; ▌Edward A. Buckland (Socialist) 4.3%
Massachusetts 2	Frederick H. Gillett	Republican	1892	Incumbent re-elected.	▌ ✓ Frederick H. Gillett (Republican) 42.8%; ▌William G. McKechnie (Democratic) 38.1%; ▌Thomas L. Hisgen (Progressive) 18.9%
Massachusetts 3	William Wilder	Republican	1910	Incumbent re-elected.	▌ ✓ William Wilder (Republican) 45.0%; ▌M. Fred O'Connell (Democratic) 33.8%; ▌Stephen M. Marshall (Progressive) 18.4%; ▌Leon B. Stoddard (Socialist) 2.8%
Massachusetts 4	John A. Thayer	Democratic	1910	Incumbent lost re-election. Republican gain.	▌ ✓ Samuel Winslow (Republican) 49.6%; ▌John A. Thayer (Democratic) 36.7%; ▌Burton W. Potter (Progressive) 11.9%; ▌Thomas Paine Abbott (Socialist) 1.8%
Massachusetts 5	Butler Ames	Republican	1902	Incumbent retired. Republican hold.	▌ ✓ John Jacob Rogers (Republican) 44.8%; ▌Humphrey O'Sullivan (Democratic) 38.5%; ▌William N. Osgood (Progressive) 14.7%; ▌William J. Carroll (Socialist) 2.1%
Massachusetts 6	Augustus P. Gardner	Republican	1902 (special)	Incumbent re-elected.	▌ ✓ Augustus P. Gardner (Republican) 49.8%; ▌George A. Schofield (Democratic) 28.6%; ▌Arthur L. Nason (Progressive) 21.6%
Massachusetts 7	None (New district)			New seat. Democratic gain.	▌ ✓ Michael F. Phelan (Democratic) 45.9%; ▌Frank P. Bennett Jr. (Republican) 31.7%; ▌Lynn M. Ranger (Progressive) 18.0%; ▌William W. McNally (Socialist) 4.5%
Massachusetts 8	Samuel W. McCall	Republican	1892	Incumbent retired. Democratic gain.	▌ ✓ Frederick S. Deitrick (Democratic) 40.5%; ▌Frederick W. Dallinger (Republican) 36.4%; ▌Henry C. Long (Progressive) 21.6%; ▌Saul Beaumont (Socialist) 1.5%
Massachusetts 9	Ernest W. Roberts	Republican	1898	Incumbent re-elected.	▌ ✓ Ernest W. Roberts (Republican) 45.1%; ▌Henry C. Rowland (Democratic) 28.1%; ▌John Herbert (Progressive) 23.7%; ▌Squire E. Putney (Socialist) 3.1%
Massachusetts 10	William Francis Murray	Democratic	1910	Incumbent re-elected.	▌ ✓ William F. Murray (Democratic) 64.0%; ▌Daniel T. Callahan (Progressive) 19.7%; ▌Loyal L. Jenkins (Republican) 12.9%; ▌Warren A. Carpenter (Socialist) 3.4%
Massachusetts 11	Andrew J. Peters	Democratic	1906	Incumbent re-elected.	▌ ✓ Andrew J. Peters (Democratic) 64.0%; ▌Sherwin L. Cook (Republican) 31.5%; ▌Charles F. Claus (Socialist) 4.5%
Massachusetts 12	James Michael Curley	Democratic	1910	Incumbent re-elected.	▌ ✓ James Michael Curley (Democratic) 48.8%; ▌James Brendan Connolly (Progressive) 29.5%; ▌Charles H. Robinson (Republican) 19.1%; ▌Thomas G. Connolly (Socialist) 2.6%
Massachusetts 13	John W. Weeks	Republican	1904	Incumbent re-elected.	▌ ✓ John W. Weeks (Republican) 45.0%; ▌John Joseph Mitchell (Democratic) 38.4%; ▌George A. Fiel (Progressive) 16.6%
Massachusetts 14	Robert O. Harris	Republican	1910	Incumbent lost re-election. Democratic gain.	▌ ✓ Edward Gilmore (Democratic) 33.9%; ▌Henry L. Kincaide (Progressive) 32.2%; ▌Robert O. Harris (Republican) 28.3%; ▌John McCarty (Socialist) 5.7%
Massachusetts 15	William S. Greene	Republican	1898 (special)	Incumbent re-elected.	▌ ✓ William S. Greene (Republican) 45.1%; ▌John W. Coughlin (Democratic) 36.1%; ▌Alvin G. Weeks (Progressive) 16.8%; ▌George Frederick W. Wright (Socialist) 1.9%
Massachusetts 16	None (New district)			New district. Democratic gain.	▌ ✓ Thomas Chandler Thacher (Democratic) 40.2%; ▌William L. Bullock (Republican) 31.5%; ▌Thomas Thompson (Progressive) 25.1%; ▌Joseph Palme (Socialist) 3.2%

== Michigan ==
District	Incumbent			This race	
District	Member	Party	First elected	Results	Candidates
Michigan 1	Frank E. Doremus	Democratic	1910	Incumbent re-elected.	▌ ✓ Frank E. Doremus (Democratic) 38.33%; ▌James H. Pound (Progressive) 28.53%; ▌Ezra P. Beechler (Republican) 28.33%; ▌Milam F. Martin (Socialist) 4.11%
Michigan 2	William Wedemeyer	Republican	1910	Incumbent lost re-election. Democratic gain.	▌ ✓ Samuel Beakes (Democratic) 35.00%; ▌William Wedemeyer (Republican) 34.77%; ▌Hubert F. Probert (Progressive) 28.53%; ▌John P. Foster (Socialist) 1.70%
Michigan 3	John M. C. Smith	Republican	1910	Incumbent re-elected.	▌ ✓ John M. C. Smith (Republican) 32.65%; ▌Claude S. Carney (Democratic) 32.37%; ▌Edward N. Dingley (Progressive) 28.85%; ▌Levant L. Rogers (Socialist) 6.14%
Michigan 4	Edward L. Hamilton	Republican	1896	Incumbent re-elected.	▌ ✓ Edward L. Hamilton (Republican) 34.16%; ▌Albert E. Beebe (Democratic) 33.23%; ▌George M. Valentine (Progressive) 29.37%; ▌H. L. Gifford (Socialist) 3.24%
Michigan 5	Edwin F. Sweet	Democratic	1910	Incumbent lost re-election. Republican gain.	▌ ✓ Carl E. Mapes (Republican) 35.25%; ▌Edwin F. Sweet (Democratic) 33.98%; ▌Suel A. Sheldon (Progressive) 24.72%; ▌Edward A. Kosten (Socialist) 4.64%; ▌Amherst B. Cheney (Prohibition) 1.41%
Michigan 6	Samuel W. Smith	Republican	1896	Incumbent re-elected.	▌ ✓ Samuel W. Smith (Republican) 36.46%; ▌Alva M. Cummins (Democratic) 31.54%; ▌William S. Kellogg (Progressive) 31.10%
Michigan 7	Henry McMorran	Republican	1902	Incumbent retired. Republican hold.	▌ ✓ Louis C. Cramton (Republican) 36.96%; ▌Loren A. Sherman (Progressive) 30.84%; ▌John J. Bell (Democratic) 29.39%; ▌Henry C. Kaumeier (Socialist) 1.67%; ▌George E. Ackerman (Prohibition) 1.15%
Michigan 8	Joseph W. Fordney	Republican	1898	Incumbent re-elected.	▌ ✓ Joseph W. Fordney (Republican) 34.36%; ▌Albert L. Chandler (Progressive) 30.14%; ▌Miles J. Purcell (Democratic) 29.97%; ▌George L. Seiferlein (Socialist) 4.05%; ▌David S. Woolman (Prohibition) 1.48%
Michigan 9	James C. McLaughlin	Republican	1906	Incumbent re-elected.	▌ ✓ James C. McLaughlin (Republican) 39.10%; ▌William H. Sears (Progressive) 34.70%; ▌Herman R. O'Connor (Democratic) 26.21%
Michigan 10	George A. Loud	Republican	1902	Incumbent lost re-election. Progressive gain.	▌ ✓ Roy O. Woodruff (Progressive) 35.11%; ▌George A. Loud (Republican) 33.09%; ▌Lewis P. Coumans (Democratic) 27.61%; ▌Miles W. Gaffney (Socialist) 4.20%
Michigan 11	Francis H. Dodds	Republican	1908	Incumbent lost renomination. Republican hold.	▌ ✓ Francis O. Lindquist (Republican) 48.24%; ▌Archie McCall (Democratic) 23.40%; ▌John W. Patchin (Progressive) 23.07%; ▌Harry N. McLean (Socialist) 3.68%; ▌George A. Chatterton (Prohibition) 1.61%
Michigan 12	H. Olin Young	Republican	1902	Incumbent lost re-election. Progressive gain.	▌ ✓ William J. MacDonald (Progressive) 39.27%; ▌H. Olin Young (Republican) 38.75%; ▌John Powers (Democratic) 21.99%
Michigan at-large	New district.			New seat. Republican gain.	▌ ✓ Patrick H. Kelley (Republican) 36.2%; ▌William H. Hill (Progressive) 34.1%; ▌Edward Frensdorf (Democratic) 29.7%

== Minnesota ==
District	Incumbent			This race	
District	Member	Party	First elected	Results	Candidates
Minnesota 1	Sydney Anderson	Republican	1910	Incumbent re-elected.	▌ ✓ Sydney Anderson (Republican) 69.6%; ▌Clinton J. Robinson (Democratic) 30.4%
Minnesota 2	Winfield Scott Hammond	Democratic	1892	Incumbent re-elected.	▌ ✓ Winfield Scott Hammond (Democratic) 50.3%; ▌Franklin Fowler Ellsworth (Republican) 44.7%; ▌John R. Hollister (Public Ownership) 5.1%
Minnesota 3	Charles Russell Davis	Republican	1902	Incumbent re-elected.	▌ ✓ Charles Russell Davis (Republican) 61.3%; ▌Clinton J. Robinson (Democratic) 32.3%; ▌Frank F. Marzahn (Prohibition) 6.4%
Minnesota 4	Frederick Stevens	Republican	1896	Incumbent re-elected.	▌ ✓ Frederick Stevens (Republican) 36.8%; ▌James J. Regan (Democratic) 27.0%; ▌Hugh T. Halbert (Progressive) 21.9%; ▌Albert Rosenquist (Public Ownership) 14.3%
Minnesota 5	Frank M. Nye	Republican	1906	Incumbent retired. Republican hold.	▌ ✓ George R. Smith (Republican) 44.3%; ▌Thomas David Schall (Progressive) 21.3%; ▌Thomas P. Dwyer (Democratic) 17.3%; ▌Thomas E. Latimer (Public Ownership) 17.2%
Minnesota 6	Charles Lindbergh	Republican	1906	Incumbent re-elected.	▌ ✓ Charles Lindbergh (Republican) 62.5%; ▌Andrew J. Gilkinson (Democratic) 29.1%; ▌Alfred W. Uhl (Public Ownership) 8.3%
Minnesota 7	Andrew Volstead	Republican	1906	Incumbent re-elected.	▌ ✓ Andrew Volstead (Republican) 100%
Minnesota 8	Clarence B. Miller	Republican	1908	Incumbent re-elected.	▌ ✓ Clarence B. Miller (Republican) 50.8%; ▌John Jenswold (Democratic) 30.9%; ▌Morris Kaplan (Public Ownership) 18.3%
Minnesota 9	Halvor Steenerson	Republican	1902	Incumbent re-elected.	▌ ✓ Halvor Steenerson (Republican) 66.7%; ▌Michael A. Brattland (Public Ownership) 33.3%
Minnesota at-large	None (new seat)			New seat. Republican gain.	▌ ✓ James Manahan (Republican) 55.1%; ▌Carl Johnson Buell (Democratic) 24.9%; ▌James S. Ingalls (Public Ownership) 10.7%; ▌William G. Calderwood (Prohibition) 9.2%

== Mississippi ==
District	Incumbent			This race	
District	Member	Party	First elected	Results	Candidates
Mississippi 1	Ezekiel S. Candler Jr.	Democratic	1900	Incumbent re-elected.	▌ ✓ Ezekiel S. Candler Jr. (Democratic) 100%
Mississippi 2	Hubert D. Stephens	Democratic	1910	Incumbent re-elected.	▌ ✓ Hubert D. Stephens (Democratic) 100%
Mississippi 3	Benjamin G. Humphreys II	Democratic	1902	Incumbent re-elected.	▌ ✓ Benjamin G. Humphreys II (Democratic) 91.26%; ▌F. F. Clark (Unknown) 8.74%
Mississippi 4	Thomas U. Sisson	Democratic	1908	Incumbent re-elected.	▌ ✓ Thomas U. Sisson (Democratic) 100%
Mississippi 5	Samuel A. Witherspoon	Democratic	1910	Incumbent re-elected.	▌ ✓ Samuel A. Witherspoon (Democratic) 100%
Mississippi 6	Pat Harrison	Democratic	1910	Incumbent re-elected.	▌ ✓ Pat Harrison (Democratic) 100%
Mississippi 7	William A. Dickson	Democratic	1908	Incumbent retired. Democratic hold.	▌ ✓ Percy Quin (Democratic) 100%
Mississippi 8	James Collier	Democratic	1908	Incumbent re-elected.	▌ ✓ James Collier (Democratic) 100%

== Missouri ==
District	Incumbent			This race	
District	Member	Party	First elected	Results	Candidates
Missouri 1	James T. Lloyd	Democratic	1898	Incumbent re-elected.	▌ ✓ James T. Lloyd (Democratic) 53.93%; ▌Beverly L. Benfoey (Republican) 31.38%; ▌Arthur B. Warner (Progressive) 14.69%
Missouri 2	William W. Rucker	Democratic	1898	Incumbent re-elected.	▌ ✓ William W. Rucker (Democratic) 57.33%; ▌Edward F. Haley (Republican) 25.49%; ▌R. H. Williams (Progressive) 17.05%; ▌Clarence E. Campbell (Socialist) 0.13%
Missouri 3	Joshua W. Alexander	Democratic	1906	Incumbent re-elected.	▌ ✓ Joshua W. Alexander (Democratic) 52.85%; ▌James H. Morroway (Republican) 29.31%; ▌W. Sam Wightman (Progressive) 17.84%
Missouri 4	Charles F. Booher	Democratic	1889	Incumbent re-elected.	▌ ✓ Charles F. Booher (Democratic) 53.76%; ▌Claude V. Hickman (Republican) 29.98%; ▌Fred P. Robinson (Progressive) 14.21%; ▌Edward D. Wilcox (Socialist) 2.05%
Missouri 5	William P. Borland	Democratic	1908	Incumbent re-elected.	▌ ✓ William P. Borland (Democratic) 52.86%; ▌Charles A. Sumner (Progressive) 34.61%; ▌Isaac B. Kimbrell (Republican) 9.12%; ▌Charles F. Streckhahn (Socialist) 2.57%; Others: ▌Orange J. Hill (Prohibition) 0.58%; ▌Karl Oberheu (Socialist Labor) 0.26%
Missouri 6	Clement C. Dickinson	Democratic	1910	Incumbent re-elected.	▌ ✓ Clement C. Dickinson (Democratic) 52.24%; ▌Louis T. Dunaway (Republican) 26.60%; ▌G. A. Theilmann (Progressive) 19.86%; ▌Herman P. Faris (Prohibition) 1.31%
Missouri 7	Courtney W. Hamlin	Democratic	1902	Incumbent re-elected.	▌ ✓ Courtney W. Hamlin (Democratic) 48.89%; ▌Theodore C. Owen (Republican) 33.09%; ▌William W. Blain (Progressive) 15.41%; ▌H. N. Schurman (Socialist) 2.61%
Missouri 8	Dorsey W. Shackleford	Democratic	1899	Incumbent re-elected.	▌ ✓ Dorsey W. Shackleford (Democratic) 53.05%; ▌David W. Peters (Republican) 39.13%; ▌Morton H. Pemberton (Progressive) 7.82%
Missouri 9	Champ Clark	Democratic	1892	Incumbent re-elected.	▌ ✓ Champ Clark (Democratic) 56.47%; ▌William L. Cole (Republican) 42.21%; ▌George Strattman (Socialist) 1.1%; ▌Leopold Kolkmeier (Socialist Labor) 0.22%
Missouri 10	Richard Bartholdt	Republican	1892	Incumbent re-elected.	▌ ✓ Richard Bartholdt (Republican) 37.57%; ▌William L. Cole (Democratic) 35.29%; ▌August Siebert (Progressive) 18.56%; ▌George Strattman (Socialist) 8.09%; ▌Leopold Kolkmeier (Socialist Labor) 0.5%
Missouri 11	Patrick F. Gill	Democratic	1908	Incumbent lost renomination. Democratic hold.	▌ ✓ William L. Igoe (Democratic) 50.41%; ▌Theron E. Catlin (Republican) 31.93%; ▌John W. Ward (Progressive) 12.34%; ▌Philip H. Mueller (Socialist) 4.97%; ▌Joseph Scheidler (Socialist Labor) 0.34%
Missouri 12	Leonidas C. Dyer	Republican	1910	Incumbent lost re-election. Democratic gain.	▌ ✓ Michael J. Gill (Democratic) 50.73%; ▌Leonidas C. Dyer (Republican) 49.27%
Missouri 13	Walter L. Hensley	Democratic	1910	Incumbent re-elected.	▌ ✓ Walter L. Hensley (Democratic) 52.11%; ▌Simon G. Nipper (Republican) 43.44%; ▌George W. O'Dam (Socialist) 4.45%
Missouri 14	Joseph J. Russell	Democratic	1904	Incumbent re-elected.	▌ ✓ Joseph J. Russell (Democratic) 46.49%; ▌George R. Curry (Republican) 44.68%; ▌Albert F. Bumpas (Socialist) 8.84%
Missouri 15	James A. Daugherty	Democratic	1910	Incumbent lost re-nomination. Democratic hold.	▌ ✓ Perl D. Decker (Democratic) 46.01%; ▌Isaac V. McPherson (Republican) 28.16%; ▌Henry H. Gregg (Progressive) 17.08%; ▌W. J. Bedingfield (Socialist) 7.02%; ▌William H. Dalton (Prohibition) 1.31%; ▌Arthur E. Holbrook (Socialist Labor) 0.42%
Missouri 16	Thomas L. Rubey	Democratic	1908	Incumbent re-elected.	▌ ✓ Thomas L. Rubey (Democratic) 52.33%; ▌James P. O'Bannon (Republican) 35.57%; ▌Columbus Bradford (Progressive) 12.1%

== Montana ==
District	Incumbent			This race	
District	Member	Party	First elected	Results	Candidates
Montana at-large 2 seats on a general ticket	Charles N. Pray	Republican	1906	Incumbent lost re-election. Democratic gain.	▌ ✓ Tom Stout (Democratic) 17.8%; ▌ ✓ John M. Evans (Democratic) 16.8%; ▌Charles N. Pray (Republican) 16.1%; ▌William Allen (Republican) 13.5%; ▌Thomas M. Everett (Progressive) 11.4%; ▌George A. Horkan (Progressive) 10.5%; ▌Henri Labeau (Socialist) 7.0%; ▌J. Frank Mabie (Socialist) 6.9%
Montana at-large 2 seats on a general ticket	None (new seat)			New seat. Democratic gain.	▌ ✓ Tom Stout (Democratic) 17.8%; ▌ ✓ John M. Evans (Democratic) 16.8%; ▌Charles N. Pray (Republican) 16.1%; ▌William Allen (Republican) 13.5%; ▌Thomas M. Everett (Progressive) 11.4%; ▌George A. Horkan (Progressive) 10.5%; ▌Henri Labeau (Socialist) 7.0%; ▌J. Frank Mabie (Socialist) 6.9%

== Nebraska ==
District	Incumbent			This race	
District	Member	Party	First elected	Results	Candidates
Nebraska 1	John A. Maguire	Democratic	1908	Incumbent re-elected.	▌ ✓ John A. Maguire (Democratic) 50.52%; ▌Paul F. Clark (Republican) 45.57%; ▌C. R. Oyler (Socialist) 2.52%; ▌N. A. Carraker (Prohibition) 1.40%
Nebraska 2	Charles O. Lobeck	Democratic	1910	Incumbent re-elected.	▌ ✓ Charles O. Lobeck (Democratic) 47.44%; ▌Howard H. Baldrige (Republican) 46.22%; ▌J. N. Carter (Socialist) 6.33%
Nebraska 3	Dan V. Stephens	Democratic	1911 (special)	Incumbent re-elected.	▌ ✓ Dan V. Stephens (Democratic) 53.14%; ▌Joseph C. Cook (Republican) 43.92%; ▌N. H. Nye (Socialist) 1.85%; ▌Henry F. Hockenberger (Prohibition) 1.09%
Nebraska 4	Charles H. Sloan	Republican	1910	Incumbent re-elected.	▌ ✓ Charles H. Sloan (Republican) 52.98%; ▌Charles M. Skiles (Democratic) 43.44%; ▌E. E. Olmstead (Socialist) 2.26%; ▌L. A. White (Prohibition) 1.32%
Nebraska 5	George W. Norris	Republican	1902	Incumbent retired to run for U.S. senator. Republican hold.	▌ ✓ Silas R. Barton (Republican) 49.04%; ▌Roderick D. Sutherland (Democratic) 45.67%; ▌W. C. Elliott (Socialist) 3.70%; ▌George W. Porter (Prohibition) 1.59%
Nebraska 6	Moses Kinkaid	Republican	1902	Incumbent re-elected.	▌ ✓ Moses Kinkaid (Republican) 47.51%; ▌William J. Taylor (Democratic) 35.54%; ▌Florence Armstrong (Prohibition) 9.59%; ▌Fred J. Warren (Socialist) 7.21%; ▌Lucien Stebbins (Progressive) 0.16%

== Nevada ==
District	Incumbent			This race	
District	Member	Party	First elected	Results	Candidates
Nevada at-large	Edwin E. Roberts	Republican	1910	Incumbent re-elected.	▌ ✓ Edwin E. Roberts (Republican) 37.32%; ▌Clay Tallman (Democratic) 36.97%; ▌John E. Worden (Socialist) 15.23%; ▌George Springmeyer (Progressive) 10.48%

== New Hampshire ==
District	Incumbent			This race	
District	Member	Party	First elected	Results	Candidates
New Hampshire 1	Cyrus A. Sulloway	Republican	1894	Incumbent lost re-election. Democratic gain.	▌ ✓ Eugene E. Reed (Democratic) 45.38%; ▌Cyrus A. Sulloway (Republican) 41.72%; ▌Samuel O. Titus (Progressive) 10.35%; ▌Michael B. Roth (Socialist) 2.06%
New Hampshire 2	Frank D. Currier	Republican	1900	Incumbent lost re-election. Democratic gain.	▌ ✓ Raymond B. Stevens (Democratic) 53.61%; ▌Frank D. Currier (Republican) 44.18%; ▌Horace W. Spokesfield (Socialist) 1.78%

== New Jersey ==
District	Incumbent			This race	
District	Member	Party	First elected	Results	Candidates
New Jersey 1	William J. Browning	Republican	1911	Incumbent re-elected.	▌ ✓ William J. Browning (Republican) 39.27%; ▌O. Stewart Craven (Democratic) 35.64%; ▌Frank B. Jess (Roosevelt Progressive) 15.94%; ▌William P. Shrouds (Socialist) 4.95%; ▌George D. Chenoweth (Progressive) 2.75%; ▌Joseph L. Surtees (Prohibition) 1.45%
New Jersey 2	John J. Gardner	Republican	1892	Incumbent lost re-election. Democratic gain.	▌ ✓ J. Thompson Baker (Democratic) 43.13%; ▌John J. Gardner (Republican) 32.97%; ▌Francis D. Potter (Progressive) 19.74%; ▌Lewis L. Eavenson (Prohibition) 2.16%; ▌G. A. McKeon (Socialist) 2%
New Jersey 3	Thomas J. Scully	Democratic	1910	Incumbent re-elected.	▌ ✓ Thomas J. Scully (Democratic) 56.92%; ▌Benjamin F. Brown (Republican) 39.69%; ▌Thomas J. Scott (Prohibition) 2%; ▌Murray S. Schloss (Socialist) 1.4%
New Jersey 4	Ira W. Wood	Republican	1904	Incumbent retired. Democratic gain.	▌ ✓ Allan B. Walsh (Democratic) 44.96%; ▌William Blackman (Republican) 29.27%; ▌John E. Gill (Progressive) 22.73%; ▌Frank Gilbert (Socialist) 1.88%; Others: ▌William Lunger (Prohibition) 0.97%; ▌George Yardley (Socialist Labor) 0.19%
New Jersey 5	William E. Tuttle Jr.	Democratic	1910	Incumbent re-elected.	▌ ✓ William E. Tuttle Jr. (Democratic) 40.07%; ▌William N. Runyon (Republican) 31.34%; ▌Charles W. Ennis (Progressive) 21.28%; ▌William Amarian Matthews (Socialist) 5.95%; ▌Charles K. Ely (Prohibition) 1.11%; ▌Charles Sandberg (Socialist Labor) 0.25%
New Jersey 6	Vacant			William Hughes (D) resigned after appointment as judge of Passaic County Court of Common Pleas. Democratic hold.	▌ ✓ Lewis J. Martin (Democratic) 46.48%; ▌Stephen Wood McClave (Republican) 25.57%; ▌Leverett Sage (Progressive) 21.40%; ▌Frederick Krafft (Socialist) 4.03%; ▌Will D. Martin (Prohibition) 2.52%
New Jersey 7	None (New district)			New district. Democratic gain.	▌ ✓ Robert G. Bremner (Democratic) 42.19%; ▌Alvin Smith (Republican) 28.15%; ▌Henry Marelli (Progressive) 20.04%; ▌John Luthringer (Socialist) 6.96%; ▌Rudolph Katz (Socialist Labor) 2.03%; ▌Charles Rowland (Prohibition) 0.63%
New Jersey 8	Eugene F. Kinkead; Redistricted from the 9th district	Democratic	1908	Incumbent red-elected.	▌ ✓ Eugene F. Kinkead (Democratic) 52.29%; ▌Harold Bouton (Republican) 35.44%; ▌Robert S. Tew (Independent Republican) 8.44%; ▌George Headley (Socialist) 3.40%; ▌Donald MacMillan (Prohibition) 0.44%
New Jersey 9	Walter I. McCoy; Redistricted from the 8th district	Democratic	1910	Incumbent re-elected.	▌ ✓ Walter I. McCoy (Democratic) 42.41%; ▌Herman P. Walker (Progressive) 26.63%; ▌Richard W. Parker (Republican) 24.20%; ▌William E. Bohm (Socialist) 6.05%; ▌John Berryman (Prohibition) 0.72%
New Jersey 10	Edward W. Townsend; Redistricted from the 7th district	Democratic	1910	Incumbent re-elected.	▌ ✓ Edward W. Townsend (Democratic) 39.57%; ▌William F. Morgan (Progressive) 28.61%; ▌A. Lincoln Adams (Republican) 25.92%; ▌Alexander Cairns (Socialist) 5.52%; ▌Charles P. Gould (Prohibition) 0.38%
New Jersey 11	None (New district)			New district. Democratic gain.	▌ ✓ John J. Eagan (Democratic) 62.25%; ▌Harlan Besson (Republican) 30.75%; ▌James M. Reilly (Socialist) 6.26%; Others: ▌John Sweeney (Socialist Labor) 0.42%; ▌Charles P. Gould (Prohibition) 0.32%
New Jersey 12	James A. Hamill; Redistricted from the 10th district	Democratic	1906	Incumbent re-elected.	▌ ✓ James A. Hamill (Democratic) 67.47%; ▌George L. Record (Republican) 30.35%; ▌James Parker (Prohibition) 1.58%; ▌Edward H. Mead (Independent) 0.6%

== New Mexico ==
District	Incumbent			This race	
District	Member	Party	First elected	Results	Candidates
New Mexico at-large	Harvey B. Fergusson	Democratic	1911	Incumbent re-elected.	▌ ✓ Harvey B. Fergusson (Democratic) 45.6%; ▌Nathan Jaffa (Republican) 36.9%; ▌Andrew J. Eggum (Socialist) 12.1%; ▌Marcos DeBaca (Progressive) 5.5%
New Mexico at-large	George Curry	Republican	1911	Incumbent retired. Seat eliminated in reapportionment. Republican loss.	▌ ✓ Harvey B. Fergusson (Democratic) 45.6%; ▌Nathan Jaffa (Republican) 36.9%; ▌Andrew J. Eggum (Socialist) 12.1%; ▌Marcos DeBaca (Progressive) 5.5%

== New York ==
District	Incumbent			This race	
District	Member	Party	First elected	Results	Candidates
New York 1	Martin W. Littleton	Democratic	1910	Incumbent retired. Democratic hold.	▌ ✓ Lathrop Brown (Democratic) 40.74%; ▌Frederick C. Hicks (Republican) 29.01%; ▌William Bourke Cockran (Progressive) 27.91%; ▌Smith A. Sands (Prohibition) 1.12%; Others: ▌Harry W. Paine (Socialist) 0.96%; ▌William S. Hotline (Independence League) 0.26%
New York 2	George H. Lindsay	Democratic	1900	Incumbent retired. Democratic hold.	▌ ✓ Denis O'Leary (Democratic) 57.03%; ▌Frank E. Hopkins (Republican) 17.15%; ▌Felix Fritsche (Progressive) 17.72%; ▌William Danmar (Socialist) 7.21%; Others: ▌George Traeger (Independence League) 0.76%; ▌George H. Miller (Prohibition) 0.11%
New York 3	Frank E. Wilson; Redistricted from the 4th district.	Democratic	1898	Incumbent re-elected.	▌ ✓ Frank E. Wilson (Democratic) 47.98%; ▌Frank F. Schulz (Republican) 25.14%; ▌Westervelt Prentice (Progressive) 18.64%; ▌John J. Jennings (Socialist) 6.83%; ▌David Hunter (Independence League) 1.23%; ▌James B. Davie (Prohibition) 0.18%
New York 4	None (New district)			New district. Democratic gain.	▌ ✓ Harry H. Dale (Democratic) 47.07%; ▌William Liebermann (Republican) 18.57%; ▌Samuel Greenblatt (Progressive) 26.70%; ▌Robert J. Nolan (Socialist) 7.49%; ▌Conrad H. Palmateer (Prohibition) 0.17%
New York 5	William C. Redfield	Democratic	1908	Incumbent retired. Democratic loss.	▌ ✓ James P. Maher (Democratic) 45.98%; ▌John S. Gaynor (Republican) 28.23%; ▌Charles J. Ryan (Progressive) 21.31%; ▌Hugh O'Malley (Socialist) 3.39%; Others: ▌William N. Morrison (Independence League) 0.88%; ▌Preston E. Terry (Prohibition) 0.22%
New York 5	James P. Maher; Redistricted from the 3rd district.	Democratic	1908	Incumbent re-elected.	▌ ✓ James P. Maher (Democratic) 45.98%; ▌John S. Gaynor (Republican) 28.23%; ▌Charles J. Ryan (Progressive) 21.31%; ▌Hugh O'Malley (Socialist) 3.39%; Others: ▌William N. Morrison (Independence League) 0.88%; ▌Preston E. Terry (Prohibition) 0.22%
New York 6	William M. Calder	Republican	1904	Incumbent re-elected	▌ ✓ William M. Calder (Republican) 47.94%; ▌Robert H. Roy (Democratic) 29.38%; ▌Jesse Fuller (Progressive) 20.58%; ▌Browne C. Hammond (Socialist) 1.85%; ▌John Berry (Prohibition) 0.25%
New York 7	John J. Fitzgerald	Democratic	1898	Incumbent re-elected	▌ ✓ John J. Fitzgerald (Democratic) 59.12%; ▌Michael A. Fitzgerald (Independence League) 20.27%; ▌John E. Brady (Republican) 18.46%; ▌Henry Crygier (Socialist) 1.92%; ▌John McKee (Prohibition) 0.24%
New York 8	None (New district)			New district. Democratic gain.	▌ ✓ Daniel J. Griffin (Democratic) 59.12%; ▌Albert H. T. Banzhaf (Progressive) 26.49%; ▌Ernest P. Seelman (Republican) 18%; ▌Fred L. Lackemacher (Socialist) 3.22%; ▌Frank C. Foster (Prohibition) 0.3%
New York 9	None (New district)			New district. Democratic gain.	▌ ✓ James H. O'Brien (Democratic) 40.95%; ▌John F. Kennedy (Progressive) 26.69%; ▌Oscar W. Swift (Republican) 26.07%; ▌William Koenig (Socialist) 5.22%; ▌Robert Strahl (Independence League) 1.07%
New York 10	William Sulzer	Democratic	1894	Incumbent retired to run for Governor of New York. Democratic hold.	▌ ✓ Herman A. Metz (Democratic) 36.64%; ▌Jacob L. Holtzmann (Progressive) 28.93%; ▌Reuben L. Haskell (Republican) 25.42%; ▌Barnet Wolff (Socialist) 8.77%; Others: ▌George M. Davison (Prohibition) 0.17%; ▌John O. Nelson (Workingmen's League) 0.07%
New York 11	Charles V. Fornes	Democratic	1896	Incumbent retired. Democratic loss.	▌ ✓ Daniel J. Riordan (Democratic) 60.1%; ▌William Wirt Mills (Progressive) 21.71%; ▌William G. Rose (Republican) 15.9%; ▌John H. W. Nagle (Socialist) 1.7%; ▌William T. Magrath (Prohibition) 0.59%
New York 11	Daniel J. Riordan; Redistricted from the 8th district.	Democratic	1898	Incumbent re-elected.	▌ ✓ Daniel J. Riordan (Democratic) 60.1%; ▌William Wirt Mills (Progressive) 21.71%; ▌William G. Rose (Republican) 15.9%; ▌John H. W. Nagle (Socialist) 1.7%; ▌William T. Magrath (Prohibition) 0.59%
New York 12	Henry M. Goldfogle; Redistricted from the 9th district.	Democratic	1900	Incumbent re-elected.	▌ ✓ Henry M. Goldfogle (Democratic) 39.32%; ▌Meyer London (Socialist) 31.22%; ▌Henry Moskowitz (Progressive) 22.28%; ▌Alexander Wolf (Republican) 7.18%
New York 13	None (New district)			New district. Democratic gain.	▌ ✓ Timothy Sullivan (Democratic) 50.59%; ▌Sigmund S. Rotter (Progressive) 32.10%; ▌John B.G. Rinehart (Republican) 10.22%; ▌Joshua Wanhope (Socialist) 7.02%; ▌Richard Granville Green (Prohibition) 0.07%
New York 14	John J. Kindred	Democratic	1910	Incumbent retired. Democratic loss.	▌ ✓ Jefferson M. Levy (Democratic) 49.39%; ▌Abraham Goodman (Progressive) 24.59%; ▌E. Crosby Kindleberger (Republican) 19.14%; ▌Marie MacDonald (Socialist) 5.29%; ▌James W. Conners (Independence League) 1.12%; Others: ▌Henry B. Martin (Jefferson) 0.4%; ▌Charles H. Simmons (Prohibition) 0.08%
New York 14	Jefferson M. Levy; Redistricted from the 13th district.	Democratic	1898	Incumbent re-elected.	▌ ✓ Jefferson M. Levy (Democratic) 49.39%; ▌Abraham Goodman (Progressive) 24.59%; ▌E. Crosby Kindleberger (Republican) 19.14%; ▌Marie MacDonald (Socialist) 5.29%; ▌James W. Conners (Independence League) 1.12%; Others: ▌Henry B. Martin (Jefferson) 0.4%; ▌Charles H. Simmons (Prohibition) 0.08%
New York 15	Michael F. Conry; Redistricted from the 12th district.	Democratic	1896	Incumbent re-elected.	▌ ✓ Michael F. Conry (Democratic) 61.71%; ▌James H. Hickey (Progressive) 17.61%; ▌Francis A. O'Neill (Republican) 17.35%; ▌John Mullen (Socialist) 2.32%
New York 16	None (New district)			New district. Democratic gain.	▌ ✓ Peter J. Dooling (Democratic) 56.31%; ▌Francis C. Dale (Republican) 22.20%; ▌Timothy Healy (Progressive) 18.80%; ▌Thomas O'Byrne (Socialist) 2.55%; ▌Charles Manierre (Prohibition) 0.15%
New York 17	None (New district)			New district. Democratic gain.	▌ ✓ John F. Carew (Democratic) 51.78%; ▌Lindon Bates Jr. (Progressive) 23.13%; ▌Ogden L. Mills (Republican) 20.51%; ▌John A. Wall (Socialist) 4.5%; ▌John B. Stark (Prohibition) 0.08%
New York 18	Steven Beckwith Ayres	Democratic	1910	Incumbent lost renomination. Democratic loss.	▌ ✓ Thomas G. Patten (Democratic) 50.02%; ▌Amos Pinchot (Progressive) 24.25%; ▌S. Walter Kaufman (Republican) 18.04%; ▌Algernon Lee (Socialist) 7.61%; ▌Elzey E. Meacham (Prohibition) 0.08%
New York 18	Thomas G. Patten; Redistricted from the 15th district.	Democratic	1910	Incumbent re-elected.	▌ ✓ Thomas G. Patten (Democratic) 50.02%; ▌Amos Pinchot (Progressive) 24.25%; ▌S. Walter Kaufman (Republican) 18.04%; ▌Algernon Lee (Socialist) 7.61%; ▌Elzey E. Meacham (Prohibition) 0.08%
New York 19	John Emory Andrus	Republican	1904	Incumbent retired. Progressive gain.	▌ ✓ Walter M. Chandler (Progressive) 39.18%; ▌Franklin Leonard, Jr. (Democratic) 38.34%; ▌Alexander Brough (Republican) 19.9%; ▌Jeremiah C. Frost (Socialist) 2.45%; ▌John G. Tait (Prohibition) 0.13%
New York 20	Thomas W. Bradley	Republican	1902	Incumbent retired. Republican loss.	▌ ✓ Francis Burton Harrison (Democratic) 41.72%; ▌Julius H. Reiter (Progressive) 37.51%; ▌Abram Goodman (Republican) 12.75%; ▌Nicholas Aleinikoff (Socialist) 7.96%; ▌Herbert D. Burnham (Prohibition) 0.06%
New York 20	Francis Burton Harrison; Redistricted from the 16th district.	Democratic	1902	Incumbent re-elected.	▌ ✓ Francis Burton Harrison (Democratic) 41.72%; ▌Julius H. Reiter (Progressive) 37.51%; ▌Abram Goodman (Republican) 12.75%; ▌Nicholas Aleinikoff (Socialist) 7.96%; ▌Herbert D. Burnham (Prohibition) 0.06%
New York 21	Richard E. Connell	Democratic	1896	Incumbent won renomination, but died. Democratic loss.	▌ ✓ Henry George Jr. (Democratic) 47.04%; ▌Jerome F. Reilly (Progressive) 29.90%; ▌Martin C. Ansorge (Republican) 18.78%; ▌Miles B. Bartholemew (Socialist) 4.15%; ▌Edward A. Packer (Prohibition) 0.13%
New York 21	Henry George Jr. Redistricted from the 17th district.	Democratic	1910	Incumbent re-elected.	▌ ✓ Henry George Jr. (Democratic) 47.04%; ▌Jerome F. Reilly (Progressive) 29.90%; ▌Martin C. Ansorge (Republican) 18.78%; ▌Miles B. Bartholemew (Socialist) 4.15%; ▌Edward A. Packer (Prohibition) 0.13%
New York 22	William H. Draper	Republican	1900	Incumbent retired. Democratic gain.	▌ ✓ Henry Bruckner (Democratic) 47.68%; ▌Irving M. Crane (Progressive) 28.40%; ▌Rufus P. Johnson (Republican) 18.30%; ▌Charles Gall (Socialist) 5.51%; ▌William M. Hess (Prohibition) 0.12%
New York 23	Henry S. De Forest	Republican	1910	Incumbent lost renomination. Democratic gain.	▌ ✓ Joseph A. Goulden (Democratic) 44.25%; ▌Edward J. Raldiris (Progressive) 30.12%; ▌Peter Wynne (Republican) 20.11%; ▌Frederick Paulitsch (Socialist) 5.38%; ▌Hans P. Freece (Prohibition) 0.15%
New York 24	None (New district)			Incumbent ran in NY 34. Democratic gain.	▌ ✓ Woodson R. Oglesby (Democratic) 44.05%; ▌Alfred E. Smith (Progressive) 30.92%; ▌Barton E. Kingman (Republican) 20.34%; ▌Allan L. Benson (Socialist) 4.37%; ▌Peter Lindemann (Prohibition) 0.32%
New York 25	Theron Akin	Progressive	1910	Incumbent lost renomination. Democratic gain.	▌ ✓ Benjamin I. Taylor (Democratic) 42.16%; ▌James W. Husted (Republican) 32.65%; ▌John C. Bucher (Progressive) 22.32%; ▌Herman Kobbe (Socialist) 2.05%; ▌Louis W. Elliott (Prohibition) 0.83%
New York 26	None (New district)			New district. Republican gain.	▌ ✓ Edmund Platt (Republican) 44.49%; ▌John K. Sague (Democratic) 43.57%; ▌Augustus B. Gray (Progressive) 9.53%; ▌Mitchell Downing (Prohibition) 1.1%; ▌Harry Schefer (Socialist) 1.04%; ▌Luther Brooks (Independence League) 0.26%
New York 27	None (New district)			New district. Democratic gain.	▌ ✓ George McClellan (Democratic) 48.30%; ▌Charles B. Ward (Republican) 38.90%; ▌Horatio Seymour Manning (Progressive) 9.72%; ▌Platt N. Chase (Prohibition) 2.16%; ▌Eugene Daurner (Socialist) 0.92%
New York 28	None (New district)			Incumbent ran in NY 32. Democratic gain.	▌ ✓ Peter G. Ten Eyck (Democratic) 44.10%; ▌Daniel H. Prior (Republican) 43.88%; ▌Joseph F. McLaughlin (Progressive) 9.35%; ▌Fred L. Arland (Socialist) 1.5%; Others: ▌Jay W. Forrest (Independent) 0.77%; ▌Abram J. Negus (Prohibition) 0.41%
New York 29	None (New district)			New district. Republican gain.	▌ ✓ James S. Parker (Republican) 43.99%; ▌Milton K. Huppuch (Democratic) 35.78%; ▌Frederick E. Draper, Jr. (Progressive) 16.07%; ▌John Q. Reynolds (Socialist) 2.4%; ▌George H. Northrup (Prohibition) 1.77%
New York 30	John W. Dwight	Republican	1902	Incumbent retired. Republican hold.	▌ ✓ Samuel Wallin (Republican) 33.08%; ▌R. E. "Lee" Reynolds (Democratic) 32.35%; ▌George R. Lunn (Socialist) 22.07%; ▌Edward Everett Hale (Progressive) 11%; ▌Lyman B. Thompson (Prohibition) 1.5%
New York 31	Edwin A. Merritt; Redistricted from the 26th district.	Republican	1910	Incumbent re-elected.	▌ ✓ Edwin A. Merritt (Republican) 46.82%; ▌Dennis B. Lucey (Democratic) 32.96%; ▌John R. Burnham (Progressive) 20.22%
New York 32	Luther W. Mott; Redistricted from the 28th district.	Republican	1910	Incumbent re-elected.	▌ ✓ Luther W. Mott (Republican) 45.57%; ▌Robert E. Gregg (Democratic) 33.42%; ▌William W. Kelley (Progressive) 18.83%; ▌Oliver Curtis (Socialist) 2.18%
New York 33	Charles A. Talcott; Redistricted from the 27th district.	Democratic	1910	Incumbent re-elected.	▌ ✓ Charles A. Talcott (Democratic) 38.04%; ▌Homer P. Snyder (Republican) 35.58%; ▌Benjamin Thorne Gilbert (Progressive) 21.44%; ▌Arthur L. Byron-Curtiss (Socialist) 3.58%; ▌Frank B. Severance (Prohibition) 1.36%
New York 34	George W. Fairchild; Redistricted from the 24th district.	Republican	1906	Incumbent re-elected.	▌ ✓ George W. Fairchild (Republican) 43.78%; ▌James J. Bayard, Jr. (Democratic) 40.31%; ▌Jared C. Estleow (Progressive) 11.05%; ▌Frank Dewitt Reese (Prohibition) 3.27%; ▌John Evans Scudder (Socialist) 1.59%
New York 35	Michael E. Driscoll; Redistricted from the 29th district.	Republican	1898	Incumbent lost re-election. Democratic gain.	▌ ✓ John R. Clancy (Democratic) 35.35%; ▌Michael E. Driscoll (Republican) 35.08%; ▌Giles H. Stilwell (Progressive) 22.82%; ▌Fred Sander (Socialist) 4.76%; ▌John Richards (Prohibition) 1.99%
New York 36	Sereno E. Payne; Redistricted from the 31st district.	Republican	1882	Incumbent re-elected.	▌ ✓ Sereno E. Payne (Republican) 42.21%; ▌Richard C. Drummond (Democratic) 36.67%; ▌Wilson M. Gould (Progressive) 16.70%; ▌J. J. Tillapaugh (Prohibition) 2.31%; ▌John H. Vander Bosch (Socialist) 2.10%
New York 37	Edwin S. Underhill; Redistricted from the 33rd district.	Democratic	1910	Incumbent re-elected.	▌ ✓ Edwin S. Underhill (Democratic) 39.92%; ▌Thomas F. Fennell (Republican) 37.48%; ▌Wiley W. Capron (Progressive) 16.13%; ▌Martin A. Tuttle (Prohibition) 3.93%; ▌Joseph P. Burris (Socialist) 2.54%
New York 38	None (New district)			New district. Republican gain.	▌ ✓ Thomas B. Dunn (Republican) 35.42%; ▌George P. Decker (Democratic) 32.42%; ▌A. Emerson Babcock (Progressive) 25.15%; ▌Kendrick P. Shedd (Socialist) 5.97%; ▌D. Marvin Filkins (Prohibition) 1.05%
New York 39	Henry G. Danforth; Redistricted from the 32nd district.	Republican	1910	Incumbent re-elected.	▌ ✓ Henry G. Danforth (Republican) 39.06%; ▌Charles Ward (Democratic) 33.93%; ▌Silas L. Strivings (Progressive) 22.76%; ▌Perry A. Carpenter (Prohibition) 2.24%; ▌John E. O'Rourke (Socialist) 2.02%
New York 40	James S. Simmons; Redistricted from the 34th district.	Republican	1908	Incumbent lost re-election. Democratic gain.	▌ ✓ Robert H. Gittins (Democratic) 37.51%; ▌James S. Simmons (Republican) 33.74%; ▌Frank C. Ferguson (Progressive) 23.09%; ▌James F. Ryan (Socialist) 4.23%; ▌William Van R. Blighton (Prohibition) 1.42%
New York 41	Edward B. Vreeland; Redistricted from the 37th district.	Republican	1910	Incumbent lost renomination. Republican loss.	▌ ✓ Charles Bennett Smith (Democratic) 40.48%; ▌George A. Davis (Republican) 26.08%; ▌Henry Kobler (Progressive) 25.79%; ▌Edward Simon, Jr. (Socialist) 6.88%; ▌James H. Allen (Prohibition) 0.78%
New York 41	Charles Bennett Smith; Redistricted from the 36th district.	Democratic	1910	Incumbent re-elected.	▌ ✓ Charles Bennett Smith (Democratic) 40.48%; ▌George A. Davis (Republican) 26.08%; ▌Henry Kobler (Progressive) 25.79%; ▌Edward Simon, Jr. (Socialist) 6.88%; ▌James H. Allen (Prohibition) 0.78%
New York 42	Daniel A. Driscoll; Redistricted from the 35th district.	Democratic	1908	Incumbent re-elected.	▌ ✓ Daniel A. Driscoll (Democratic) 45.70%; ▌Willard H. Ticknor (Republican) 26.50%; ▌L. Bradley Dorr (Progressive) 22.04%; ▌Samuel Leary (Socialist) 4.96%; ▌Vernon M. Stone (Prohibition) 0.8%
New York 43	None (New district)			New district. Republican gain.	▌ ✓ Charles M. Hamilton (Republican) 37.91%; ▌Manton M. Wyvell (Democratic) 27.27%; ▌Samuel A. Carlson (Progressive) 25.59%; ▌Fred T. Williams (Socialist) 4.69%; ▌Charles E. Welch (Prohibition) 4.55%

== North Carolina ==
District	Incumbent			This race	
District	Member	Party	First elected	Results	Candidates
North Carolina 1	John H. Small	Democratic	1898	Incumbent re-elected.	▌ ✓ John H. Small (Democratic) 98.41%; ▌Marshall D. Leggitt (Republican) 1.59%
North Carolina 2	Claude Kitchin	Democratic	1898	Incumbent re-elected.	▌ ✓ Claude Kitchin (Democratic) 91.85%; ▌Thomas B. Brown (Republican) 8.13%; ▌A. J. Connor (Unknown) 0.02%
North Carolina 3	John M. Faison	Democratic	1910	Incumbent re-elected.	▌ ✓ John M. Faison (Democratic) 65.80%; ▌Thomas B. Brown (Republican) 34.20%; ▌Rodolph Duffy (Independent) 0.01%
North Carolina 4	Edward W. Pou	Democratic	1896	Incumbent re-elected.	▌ ✓ Edward W. Pou (Democratic) 79.49%; ▌John F. Mitchell (Republican) 20.50%; Write-Ins 0.02%
North Carolina 5	Charles M. Stedman	Democratic	1910	Incumbent re-elected.	▌ ✓ Charles M. Stedman (Democratic) 56.13%; ▌C. W. Curry (Republican) 42.60%; ▌George R. Greene (Socialist) 1.25%; ▌David H. Blair (Progressive) 0.02%
North Carolina 6	Hannibal L. Godwin	Democratic	1906	Incumbent re-elected.	▌ ✓ Hannibal L. Godwin (Democratic) 98.63%; ▌Thomas A. Norment (Ind. Republican) 1.37%
North Carolina 7	Robert N. Page	Democratic	1902	Incumbent re-elected.	▌ ✓ Robert N. Page (Democratic) 58.94%; ▌R. Don Laws (Republican) 41.05%; Write-Ins 0.01%
North Carolina 8	Robert L. Doughton	Democratic	1910	Incumbent re-elected.	▌ ✓ Robert L. Doughton (Democratic) 55.59%; ▌George D.B. Reynolds (Republican) 44.23%; Others: ▌W. H. Jenkins (Socialist) 0.11%; ▌E. P. Deal (Prohibition) 0.06%
North Carolina 9	E. Yates Webb	Democratic	1902	Incumbent re-elected.	▌ ✓ E. Yates Webb (Democratic) 62.66%; ▌John A. Smith (Progressive) 29.03%; ▌D. B. Paul (Republican) 8.30%
North Carolina 10	James M. Gudger Jr.	Democratic	1902	Incumbent re-elected.	▌ ✓ James M. Gudger Jr. (Democratic) 53.05%; ▌R. Hilliard Staton (Republican) 46.67%; Others: ▌James B. White (Socialist) 0.28%; ▌Pearson (Independent) 0.01%

== North Dakota ==
District	Incumbent			This race	
District	Member	Party	First elected	Results	Candidates
North Dakota 1	Henry T. Helgesen; Redistricted from the at-large district.	Republican	1910	Incumbent re-elected.	▌ ✓ Henry T. Helgesen (Republican) 61.11%; ▌Verner E. Lovell (Democratic) 34.23%; ▌Leon Durocher (Socialist) 4.67%
North Dakota 2	None (new district)			New seat. Republican gain.	▌ ✓ George M. Young (Republican) 64.40%; ▌J. A. Minckler (Democratic) 28.28%; ▌John A. Yoder (Socialist) 7.32%
North Dakota 3	None (new district)			New seat. Republican gain.	▌ ✓ Patrick Norton (Republican) 50.74%; ▌Halvor L. Halvorson (Democratic) 28.66%; ▌Arthur LeSueur (Socialist) 20.61%

== Ohio ==
District	Incumbent			This race	
District	Member	Party	First elected	Results	Candidates
Ohio 1	Nicholas Longworth	Republican	1902	Incumbent lost reelection. Democratic gain.	▌ ✓ Stanley E. Bowdle (Democratic) 41.99%; ▌Nicholas Longworth (Republican) 41.80%; ▌Millard F. Andrew (Progressive) 10.85%; ▌Lawrence A. Zitt (Socialist) 5.36%
Ohio 2	Alfred G. Allen	Democratic	1910	Incumbent reelected.	▌ ✓ Alfred G. Allen (Democratic) 46.6%; ▌Otto J. Renner (Republican) 37.74%; ▌William B. Hay (Progressive) 8.83%; ▌R. S. Moore (Socialist) 6.83%
Ohio 3	James M. Cox	Democratic	1908	Incumbent retired to run for Ohio Governor. Democratic hold.	▌ ✓ Warren Gard (Democratic) 42.94%; ▌Bert B. Buckley (Republican) 24.66%; ▌Frederick G. Strickland (Socialist) 20.53%; ▌Alfred G. Pease (Progressive) 11.21%; ▌Jasper Huffman (Prohibition) 0.66%
Ohio 4	J. Henry Goeke	Democratic	1910	Incumbent reelected.	▌ ✓ J. Henry Goeke (Democratic) 53.79%; ▌John L. Cable (Republican) 25.67%; ▌William E. Rudy (Progressive) 12.48%; ▌Scott Williams (Socialist) 5.33%; ▌W. Rollo Boehringer (Prohibition) 2.73%
Ohio 5	Timothy T. Ansberry	Democratic	1904	Incumbent reelected.	▌ ✓ Timothy T. Ansberry (Democratic) 64.01%; ▌Edward Staley (Republican) 32.42%; ▌George W. Kirk (Socialist) 3.57%
Ohio 6	Matthew Denver	Democratic	1906	Incumbent retired. Republican gain.	▌ ✓ Simeon D. Fess (Republican) 49.19%; ▌D. K. Hempstead (Democratic) 47.04%; ▌G. D. Vandervort (Socialist) 3.76%
Ohio 7	James D. Post	Democratic	1910	Incumbent reelected.	▌ ✓ James D. Post (Democratic) 46.69%; ▌R. M. Hughey (Republican) 44.99%; ▌Winfield S. Tibbetts (Socialist) 7.26%; ▌Gustavus P. Raup (Prohibition) 1.06%
Ohio 8	Frank B. Willis	Republican	1910	Incumbent reelected.	▌ ✓ Frank B. Willis (Republican) 43.84%; ▌W. W. Durbin (Democratic) 40.64%; ▌Lemuel G. Herbert (Progressive) 12.28%; ▌Arthur G. Parthemer (Socialist) 3.24%
Ohio 9	Isaac R. Sherwood	Democratic	1872	Incumbent reelected.	▌ ✓ Isaac R. Sherwood (Democratic) 53.28%; ▌Holland C. Webster (Republican) 35.13%; ▌Thomas C. Devine (Socialist) 11.59%
Ohio 10	Robert M. Switzer	Republican	1910	Incumbent reelected.	▌ ✓ Robert M. Switzer (Republican) 37.07%; ▌Charles M. Caldwell (Democratic) 36.58%; ▌William E. Pricer (Progressive) 19.32%; ▌William Miller (Socialist) 7.03%
Ohio 11	Horatio C. Claypool	Democratic	1910	Incumbent reelected.	▌ ✓ Horatio C. Claypool (Democratic) 49.12%; ▌Albert Douglas (Republican) 42.83%; ▌Albert Smith (Socialist) 8.05%
Ohio 12	Edward L. Taylor Jr.	Republican	1904	Incumbent lost re-election. Democratic gain.	▌ ✓ Clement L. Brumbaugh (Democratic) 52.27%; ▌Edward L. Taylor Jr. (Republican) 31.53%; ▌Jacob L. Bachman (Socialist) 15.24%; ▌John R. Schmidt (Prohibition) 0.97%
Ohio 13	Carl C. Anderson	Democratic	1908	Incumbent died. Democratic hold.	▌ ✓ John A. Key (Democratic) 50.31%; ▌Miles H. McLaughlin (Republican) 24.82%; ▌Benjamin F. Scheidler (Progressive) 12.92%; ▌George P. Maxwell (Socialist) 11.96%
Ohio 14	William G. Sharp	Democratic	1900	Incumbent re-elected.	▌ ✓ William G. Sharp (Democratic) 59.04%; ▌Winfield S. Kerr (Republican) 32.71%; ▌George A. Storck (Socialist) 8.26%
Ohio 15	George White	Democratic	1906	Incumbent re-elected.	▌ ✓ George White (Democratic) 43.91%; ▌James Joyce (Republican) 35.47%; ▌Howard E. Buker (Progressive) 12.01%; ▌Frank B. Martin (Socialist) 7.33%; ▌James T. Orr (Prohibition) 1.28%
Ohio 16	William B. Francis	Democratic	1910	Incumbent re-elected.	▌ ✓ William B. Francis (Democratic) 43.91%; ▌David Hollingsworth (Republican) 35.47%; ▌Robert Carson (Progressive) 12.01%
Ohio 17	William A. Ashbrook	Democratic	1906	Incumbent re-elected.	▌ ✓ William A. Ashbrook (Democratic) 72.09%; ▌Albert R. Milner (Progressive) 16.70%; ▌Dan McCarton (Socialist) 11.21%
Ohio 18	John J. Whitacre	Democratic	1908	Incumbent re-elected.	▌ ✓ John J. Whitacre (Democratic) 43.60%; ▌Roscoe C. McCullough (Republican) 42.53%; ▌George F. Lelansky (Socialist) 13.87%
Ohio 19	Ellsworth R. Bathrick	Democratic	1910	Incumbent re-elected.	▌ ✓ Ellsworth R. Bathrick (Democratic) 35.86%; ▌W. S. Harris (Progressive) 28.40%; ▌Hiram G. Starkey (Republican) 20.50%; ▌C. E. Sheplin (Socialist) 13.82%; ▌Nathan Johnson (Prohibition) 1.42%
Ohio 20	L. Paul Howland	Republican	1906	Incumbent lost re-election. Democratic gain.	▌ ✓ William Gordon (Democratic) 40.27%; ▌Frank W. Woods (Progressive) 30.05%; ▌L. Paul Howland (Republican) 21.03%; ▌John G. Willett (Socialist) 8.65%
Ohio 21	Robert J. Bulkley	Democratic	1910	Incumbent re-elected.	▌ ✓ Robert J. Bulkley (Democratic) 42.88%; ▌Augustus R. Hatton (Progressive) 28.45%; ▌Frederick L. Taft (Republican) 18.22%; ▌Fred C. Ruppel (Socialist) 10.46%

== Oklahoma ==
District	Incumbent			This race	
District	Member	Party	First elected	Results	Candidates
Oklahoma 1	Bird S. McGuire	Republican	1907	Incumbent re-elected.	▌ ✓ Bird S. McGuire (Republican) 45.0%; ▌John J. Davis (Democratic) 43.6%; ▌Achilles W. Renshaw (Socialist) 10.5%; ▌Thomas P. Hopley (Prohibition) 0.7%
Oklahoma 2	Dick T. Morgan	Republican	1908	Incumbent re-elected.	▌ ✓ Dick T. Morgan (Republican) 43.8%; ▌J. J. Carney (Democratic) 42.7%; ▌P. D. McKenzie (Socialist) 13.4%
Oklahoma 3	James S. Davenport	Democratic	1910	Incumbent re-elected.	▌ ✓ James S. Davenport (Democratic) 49.5%; ▌R. T. Daniel (Republican) 38.0%; ▌Lewis B. Irvin (Socialist) 11.7%; ▌H. L. Storm (Independent) 0.6%
Oklahoma 4	Charles D. Carter	Democratic	1907	Incumbent re-elected.	▌ ✓ Charles D. Carter (Democratic) 51.3%; ▌E. N. Wright (Republican) 24.4%; ▌Fred W. Holt (Socialist) 24.2%
Oklahoma 5	Scott Ferris	Democratic	1907	Incumbent re-elected.	▌ ✓ Scott Ferris (Democratic) 56.2%; ▌C. O. Clark (Republican) 22.7%; ▌H. H. Stallard (Socialist) 20.9%
Oklahoma at-large 3 seats on a general ticket	None (new seat)			New seat. Democratic gain.	▌ ✓ William H. Murray (Democratic) 16.2%; ▌ ✓ Claude Weaver (Democratic) 16.2%; ▌ ✓ Joseph B. Thompson (Democratic) 16.1%; ▌Alvin D. Allen (Republican) 11.7%; ▌James L. Brown (Republican) 11.7%; ▌Emory Brownlee (Republican) 11.5%; ▌Oscar Ameringer (Socialist) 5.5%; ▌J. T. Cumbie (Socialist) 5.5%; ▌J. Luther Langston (Socialist) 5.5%
Oklahoma at-large 3 seats on a general ticket	None (new seat)			New seat. Democratic gain.	▌ ✓ William H. Murray (Democratic) 16.2%; ▌ ✓ Claude Weaver (Democratic) 16.2%; ▌ ✓ Joseph B. Thompson (Democratic) 16.1%; ▌Alvin D. Allen (Republican) 11.7%; ▌James L. Brown (Republican) 11.7%; ▌Emory Brownlee (Republican) 11.5%; ▌Oscar Ameringer (Socialist) 5.5%; ▌J. T. Cumbie (Socialist) 5.5%; ▌J. Luther Langston (Socialist) 5.5%
Oklahoma at-large 3 seats on a general ticket	None (new seat)			New seat. Democratic gain.	▌ ✓ William H. Murray (Democratic) 16.2%; ▌ ✓ Claude Weaver (Democratic) 16.2%; ▌ ✓ Joseph B. Thompson (Democratic) 16.1%; ▌Alvin D. Allen (Republican) 11.7%; ▌James L. Brown (Republican) 11.7%; ▌Emory Brownlee (Republican) 11.5%; ▌Oscar Ameringer (Socialist) 5.5%; ▌J. T. Cumbie (Socialist) 5.5%; ▌J. Luther Langston (Socialist) 5.5%

== Oregon ==
District	Incumbent			This race	
District	Member	Party	First elected	Results	Candidates
Oregon 1	Willis C. Hawley	Republican	1906	Incumbent re-elected.	▌ ✓ Willis C. Hawley (Republican) 43.1%; ▌R. G. Smith (Democratic) 24.6%; ▌John W. Campbell (Progressive) 13.9%; ▌W. S. Richards (Socialist) 11.5%; ▌O. A. Stillman (Prohibition) 6.9%
Oregon 2	None (new district)			New seat. Republican gain.	▌ ✓ Nicholas J. Sinnott (Republican) 53.5%; ▌James H. Graham (Democratic) 29.4%; ▌C. H. Abercrombie (Socialist) 10.7%; ▌George L. Cleaver (Prohibition) 6.4%
Oregon 3	Walter Lafferty; Redistricted from the 2nd district	Republican	1910	Incumbent re-elected.	▌ ✓ Walter Lafferty (Republican) 42.9%; ▌M. G. Munly (Democratic) 29.6%; ▌Thomas McCusker (Independent) 16.1%; ▌Lee Campbell (Socialist) 7.8%; ▌LeGrand M. Baldwin (Prohibition) 3.6%

== Pennsylvania ==
District	Incumbent			This race	
District	Member	Party	First elected	Results	Candidates
Pennsylvania 1	William Scott Vare	Republican	1912	Incumbent re-elected.	▌ ✓ William Scott Vare (Republican) 68.67%; ▌John H. Hall (Democratic) 28.59%; ▌Harry Gantz (Socialist) 2.74%
Pennsylvania 2	William S. Reyburn	Republican	1911	Incumbent withdrew from primary. Republican hold.	▌ ✓ George S. Graham (Republican) 50.7%; ▌William Schlipf (Democratic) 26.05%; ▌Harry W. Lambrith (Progressive) 19.85%; ▌Harvey C. Parker (Socialist) 3.21%; ▌William S. Umstead (Prohibition) 0.19%
Pennsylvania 3	J. Hampton Moore	Republican	1906	Incumbent re-elected.	▌ ✓ J. Hampton Moore (Republican) 54.15%; ▌John H. Fow (Democratic) 21.71%; ▌Harry E. Walter (Progressive) 20.69%; ▌George Ruby (Socialist) 3.45%
Pennsylvania 4	Reuben Moon	Republican	1903	Incumbent lost renomination. Republican hold.	▌ ✓ George W. Edmonds (Republican) 68.51%; ▌Thomas T. Nelson (Democratic) 26.74%; ▌Charles DeKyne (Socialist) 4.45%; ▌Henry C. Russell (Prohibition) 0.31%
Pennsylvania 5	Michael Donohoe	Democratic	1908	Incumbent re-elected	▌ ✓ Michael Donohoe (Democratic) 55.17%; ▌Henry S. Borneman (Republican) 38.07%; ▌John Whitehead (Socialist) 6.53%; ▌E. A. Moore (Prohibition) 0.23%
Pennsylvania 6	George D. McCreary	Republican	1902	Incumbent retired. Democratic gain.	▌ ✓ J. Washington Logue (Democratic) 34.88%; ▌Frederick S. Drake (Washington) 31.01%; ▌Harry Arista Mackey (Republican) 30.46%; ▌Perry R. Long (Socialist) 3.15%; Others: ▌William C. Letson (Prohibition) 0.42%; ▌Francis T. Tobin (Workingman) 0.09%
Pennsylvania 7	Thomas S. Butler	Republican	1896	Incumbent re-elected	▌ ✓ Thomas S. Butler (Republican) 46.70%; ▌Eugene C. Bonniwell (Democratic) 31.24%; ▌Frederick A. Howard (Washington) 19.54%; ▌Walter N. Lodge (Socialist) 1.56%; ▌Edwin P. Sellew (Prohibition) 0.97%
Pennsylvania 8	Robert E. Difenderfer	Democratic	1910	Incumbent re-elected	▌ ✓ Robert E. Difenderfer (Democratic) 38.19%; ▌Oscar O. Bean (Republican) 33.19%; ▌Thomas K. Ober (Washington) 25.57%; ▌James C. Hogan (Socialist) 3.05%
Pennsylvania 9	William Walton Griest	Republican	1908	Incumbent re-elected	▌ ✓ William Walton Griest (Republican) 42.71%; ▌John N. Hetrick (Bull Moose) 30.11%; ▌Richard M. Reilly (Democratic) 24.34%; ▌E. S. Musser (Socialist) 2.02%; ▌Daniel S. Von Neida (Prohibition) 0.82%
Pennsylvania 10	John R. Farr	Republican	1908	Incumbent re-elected	▌ ✓ John R. Farr (Republican) 49.64%; ▌Michael A. McGinley (Democratic) 42.46%; ▌Madison F. Larkin (Prohibition) 4.31%; ▌L. H. Gibbs (Socialist) 2.87%; ▌T. Ellsworth Davies (Nat'l Progressive) 0.72%
Pennsylvania 11	Charles C. Bowman	Republican	1910	Incumbent lost re-election. Democratic gain.	▌ ✓ John J. Casey (Democratic) 34.88%; ▌Clarence D. Coughlin (Washington) 31.01%; ▌Charles C. Bowman (Republican) 30.46%; ▌Charles F. Quinn (Socialist) 3.15%
Pennsylvania 12	Robert Emmett Lee	Democratic	1908	Incumbent re-elected	▌ ✓ Robert Emmett Lee (Democratic) 50.41%; ▌Alfred B. Garner (Republican) 35.40%; ▌William W. Thorn (Progressive) 1.74%; ▌Cornelius F. Foley (Socialist) 11.72%; ▌H. F. Reber (Prohibition) 0.73%
Pennsylvania 13	John H. Rothermel	Democratic	1906	Incumbent re-elected	▌ ✓ John H. Rothermel (Democratic) 50.61%; ▌Claude T. Reno (Republican) 39.16%; ▌Clarence T. Wixson (Socialist) 9.48%; Others: ▌Oliver K. Mohr (Prohibition) 0.52%; ▌Harry A. Cyphers (Keystone) 0.16%; ▌Caleb Harrison (Industrialist) 0.07%
Pennsylvania 14	William D. B. Ainey	Republican	1911	Incumbent re-elected	▌ ✓ William D. B. Ainey (Republican) 61.07%; ▌Joel G. Hill (Democratic) 34.72%; ▌William S. Heermans (Prohibition) 2.92%; ▌Charles Welch (Socialist) 1.29%
Pennsylvania 15	William B. Wilson	Democratic	1906	Incumbent lost re-election. Republican gain.	▌ ✓ Edgar R. Kiess (Republican) 45.92%; ▌William B. Wilson (Democratic) 44.08%; ▌Aaron Noll (Socialist) 7.37%; ▌David Salmon (Prohibition) 2.63%
Pennsylvania 16	John G. McHenry	Democratic	1906	Incumbent died. Democratic hold.	▌ ✓ John V. Lesher (Democratic) 47.08%; ▌I. Clinton Kline (Republican) 42.35%; ▌George W. Dornbach (Socialist) 9.07%; ▌T. P. Jepson (Prohibition) 1.50%
Pennsylvania 17	Benjamin K. Focht	Republican	1900	Incumbent lost re-election. Democratic gain.	▌ ✓ Franklin Lewis Dershem (Democratic) 38.87%; ▌Benjamin K. Focht (Republican) 30.32%; ▌Frank B. Clayton (Washington) 26.08%; ▌William G. Bowers (Socialist) 3.8%; ▌W. C. Bratton (Prohibition) 0.93%
Pennsylvania 18	Marlin E. Olmsted	Republican	1896	Incumbent retired. Republican hold.	▌ ✓ Aaron S. Kreider (Republican) 32.29%; ▌David L. Kaufman (Democratic) 31.39%; ▌Henry C. Demming (Washington) 30.10%; ▌J. Milton Ibach (Socialist) 4.43%; ▌Edwin H. Molly (Prohibition) 1.79%
Pennsylvania 19	Jesse L. Hartman	Republican	1910	Incumbent lost re-election. Democratic gain.	▌ ✓ Warren W. Bailey (Democratic) 31.78%; ▌Jesse L. Hartman (Republican) 29.56%; ▌Lynn A. Brua (Washington) 29.46%; ▌Daniel W. Murphy (Socialist) 6.71%; ▌Adie A. Stevens (Prohibition) 1.35%; ▌John W. Blake (Keystone) 1.11%
Pennsylvania 20	Daniel F. Lafean	Republican	1902	Incumbent lost re-election. Democratic gain.	▌ ✓ Andrew R. Brodbeck (Democratic) 31.78%; ▌Daniel F. Lafean (Republican) 29.56%; ▌Robert C. Blair (Washington) 29.46%; ▌George W. Bacon (Socialist) 6.71%; ▌Henry H. Trumpfheller (Prohibition) 1.35%
Pennsylvania 21	Charles E. Patton	Republican	1910	Incumbent re-elected	▌ ✓ Charles E. Patton (Republican) 50.27%; ▌James A. Gleason (Democratic) 38.76%; ▌George W. Fox (Socialist) 7.47%; ▌W. H. Watt (Prohibition) 3.50%
Pennsylvania 22	Curtis H. Gregg	Democratic	1900	Incumbent lost re-election. Republican gain.	▌ ✓ Abraham L. Keister (Republican) 41.56%; ▌Curtis H. Gregg (Democratic) 39.91%; ▌Charles Cunningham (Socialist) 12.65%; ▌Daniel K. Albright (Prohibition) 5.89%
Pennsylvania 23	Thomas S. Crago	Republican	1910	Incumbent lost re-election. Democratic gain.	▌ ✓ Wooda N. Carr (Democratic) 38.76%; ▌Thomas S. Crago (Republican) 24.87%; ▌Harvey L. Berkeley (Washington) 24.09%; ▌Charles L. Gans (Socialist) 9.29%; ▌Bert S. Forsythe (Prohibition) 2.99%
Pennsylvania 24	Charles Matthews	Republican	1910	Incumbent lost re-election. Progressive gain.	▌ ✓ Henry W. Temple (Washington) 30.80%; ▌Charles Matthews (Republican) 28.93%; ▌S. A. Lacock (Democratic) 23.0%; ▌George Frethey (Socialist) 13.62%; ▌James B. Peebles (Prohibition) 3.65%
Pennsylvania 25	Arthur L. Bates	Republican	1900	Incumbent retired. Republican hold.	▌ ✓ Milton W. Shreve (Republican) 47.57%; ▌Turner W. Shacklett (Democratic) 37.99%; ▌Sidney A. Schwartz (Socialist) 9.92%; ▌B. R. Pike (Prohibition) 4.52%
Pennsylvania 26	A. Mitchell Palmer	Democratic	1908	Incumbent re-elected	▌ ✓ A. Mitchell Palmer (Democratic) 53.41%; ▌Francis A. March (Republican) 42.41%; ▌George R. Miller (Socialist) 3.03%; ▌E. S. Wolfe (Prohibition) 1.15%
Pennsylvania 27	J. N. Langham	Republican	1908	Incumbent re-elected	▌ ✓ J. N. Langham (Republican) 56.73%; ▌Foster M. Mohney (Democratic) 31.35%; ▌Thomas J. Fredericks (Socialist) 6.15%; ▌John Houk (Prohibition) 5.77%
Pennsylvania 28	Peter M. Speer	Republican	1910	Incumbent lost re-election. Progressive gain.	▌ ✓ Willis J. Hulings (Washington) 31.38%; ▌John P. Hines (Democratic) 29.49%; ▌Peter M. Speer (Republican) 21.61%; ▌John R. McKeown (Socialist) 12.40%; ▌J. W. Neilly (Prohibition) 5.12%
Pennsylvania 29	Stephen G. Porter	Republican	1910	Incumbent re-elected	▌ ✓ Stephen G. Porter (Republican) 61.29%; ▌Joseph Gallagher (Democratic) 21.20%; ▌George T. McConnell (Socialist) 15.01%; ▌Robert J. Smith (Prohibition) 1.64%; ▌Charles F. Chubb (Keystone) 0.87%
Pennsylvania 30	John Dalzell	Republican	1886	Incumbent lost renomination. Republican hold.	▌ ✓ M. Clyde Kelly (Republican) 54.54%; ▌Fred H. Merrick (Socialist) 23.96%; ▌Delmont K. Ferree (Democratic) 21.24%; ▌J. A. Brought (Industrialist) 0.26%
Pennsylvania 31	James F. Burke	Republican	1902	Incumbent re-elected	▌ ✓ James F. Burke (Republican) 51.06%; ▌William A. Prosser (Socialist) 24.39%; ▌Joseph F. Joyce (Democratic) 23.40%; ▌Fred C. Brittain (Prohibition) 1.16%
Pennsylvania 32	Andrew J. Barchfeld	Republican	1902	Incumbent re-elected	▌ ✓ Andrew J. Barchfeld (Republican) 40.76%; ▌Herman L. Hegner (Democratic) 26.54%; ▌Thomas F. Kennedy (Socialist) 18.85%; ▌William M. Shrodes (Keystone) 13.85%
Pennsylvania at-large	None (New seat)			New seat. Republican gain.	▌ ✓ Fred E. Lewis (Republican)
Pennsylvania at-large	None (New seat)			New seat. Republican gain.	▌ ✓ John M. Morin (Republican)
Pennsylvania at-large	None (New seat)			New seat. Republican gain.	▌ ✓ Anderson H. Walters (Republican)
Pennsylvania at-large	None (New seat)			New seat. Republican gain.	▌ ✓ Arthur R. Rupley (Republican)

== Rhode Island ==
District	Incumbent			This race	
District	Member	Party	First elected	Results	Candidates
Rhode Island 1	George F. O'Shaunessy	Democratic	1910	Incumbent re-elected.	▌ ✓ George F. O'Shaunessy (Democratic) 50.26%; ▌William Paine Sheffield Jr. (Republican) 37.20%; ▌John E. Bolan (Progressive) 11.72%; ▌Samuel B. Prentice (Prohibition) 0.82%
Rhode Island 2	George H. Utter	Republican	1910	Incumbent died. Democratic gain.	▌ ✓ Peter G. Gerry (Democratic) 42.92%; ▌Zenas W. Bliss (Republican) 41.35%; ▌Claude C. Ball (Progressive) 14.57%; ▌William G. Lawton (Prohibition) 1.16%
Rhode Island 3	None (new district)			New seat. Republican gain.	▌ ✓ Ambrose Kennedy (Republican) 49%; ▌F. X. Ruttey (Democratic) 41.15%; ▌Edwin F. Tuttle (Progressive) 9.02%; ▌Ernest L. Merry (Prohibition) 0.83%

== South Carolina ==
District	Incumbent			This race	
District	Member	Party	First elected	Results	Candidates
South Carolina 1	George Swinton Legaré	Democratic	1902	Incumbent re-elected.	▌ ✓ George Swinton Legaré (Democratic) 97.2%; ▌Aaron P. Prioleau (Republican) 1.8%; ▌William Eberhard (Socialist) 1.0%
South Carolina 2	James F. Byrnes	Democratic	1910	Incumbent re-elected.	▌ ✓ James F. Byrnes (Democratic) 100%
South Carolina 3	Wyatt Aiken	Democratic	1902	Incumbent re-elected.	▌ ✓ Wyatt Aiken (Democratic) 100%
South Carolina 4	Joseph T. Johnson	Democratic	1900	Incumbent re-elected.	▌ ✓ Joseph T. Johnson (Democratic) 100%
South Carolina 5	David E. Finley	Democratic	1898	Incumbent re-elected.	▌ ✓ David E. Finley (Democratic) 100%
South Carolina 6	J. Edwin Ellerbe	Democratic	1904	Incumbent lost renomination. Democratic hold.	▌ ✓ J. Willard Ragsdale (Democratic) 100%
South Carolina 7	A. Frank Lever	Democratic	1900	Incumbent re-elected.	▌ ✓ A. Frank Lever (Democratic) 98.4%; ▌Alexander B. Dantzler (Republican) 1.6%

== South Dakota ==
District	Incumbent			This race	
District	Member	Party	First elected	Results	Candidates
South Dakota 1	None (new district)			New seat. Republican gain.	▌ ✓ Charles H. Dillon (Republican) 55.8%; ▌Robert E. Dowdell (Democratic) 39.5%; ▌C. V. Templeton (Prohibition) 2.6%; ▌E. M. Jacobsen (Socialist) 2.2%
South Dakota 2	Charles H. Burke; Redistricted from the at-large district	Republican	1908	Incumbent re-elected.	▌ ✓ Charles H. Burke (Republican) 57.6%; ▌C. Boyd Barrett (Democratic) 35.5%; ▌E. Francis Atwood (Socialist) 3.9%; ▌W. J. Edgar (Prohibition) 2.9%
South Dakota 3	Eben Martin; Redistricted from the at-large district	Republican	1908	Incumbent re-elected.	▌ ✓ Eben Martin (Republican) 52.5%; ▌Harry Gandy (Democratic) 42.1%; ▌J. E. Ballinger (Socialist) 5.4%

== Tennessee ==
District	Incumbent			This race	
District	Member	Party	First elected	Results	Candidates
Tennessee 1	Sam R. Sells	Republican	1910	Incumbent re-elected.	▌ ✓ Sam R. Sells (Republican) 50.87%; ▌Zachary D. Massey (Progressive Republican) 49.02%; ▌[FNU] Johnson (Independent) 0.12%
Tennessee 2	Richard W. Austin	Republican	1908	Incumbent re-elected.	▌ ✓ Richard W. Austin (Republican) 47.62%; ▌W. H. Buttram (Progressive Republican) 26.32%; ▌J. C. Williams (Democratic) 25.03%; ▌R. E. Miller (Socialist) 1.03%
Tennessee 3	John A. Moon	Democratic	1896	Incumbent re-elected.	▌ ✓ John A. Moon (Democratic) 67.36%; ▌C. S. Stewart (Republican) 23.56%; ▌J. W. Eastman (Progressive) 8.01%; ▌Daniel Shirley (Socialist) 1.07%
Tennessee 4	Cordell Hull	Democratic	1906	Incumbent re-elected.	▌ ✓ Cordell Hull (Democratic) 64.92%; ▌I. J. Human (Republican) 34.84%; ▌John H. Compton (Socialist) 0.24%
Tennessee 5	William C. Houston	Democratic	1904	Incumbent re-elected.	▌ ✓ William C. Houston (Democratic) 54.28%; ▌J. C. Beasley (Democratic) 37.99%; ▌Doak Aydelott (Democratic) 7.59%; ▌N. Bartlett (Socialist) 0.14%
Tennessee 6	Jo Byrns	Democratic	1908	Incumbent re-elected.	▌ ✓ Jo Byrns (Democratic) 82.03%; ▌J. A. Althauser (Republican) 15.30%; ▌L. A. Wiles (Socialist) 2.66%
Tennessee 7	Lemuel P. Padgett	Democratic	1900	Incumbent re-elected.	▌ ✓ Lemuel P. Padgett (Democratic) 55.07%; ▌Clarence W. Turner (Democratic) 44.83%; ▌D. J. Bevis (Unknown) 0.10%
Tennessee 8	Thetus W. Sims	Democratic	1896	Incumbent re-elected.	▌ ✓ Thetus W. Sims (Democratic) 54.15%; ▌J. W. Ross (Republican) 36.39%; ▌C. Grissam (Progressive) 8.77%; ▌B. W. Parker (Socialist) 0.69%
Tennessee 9	Finis J. Garrett	Democratic	1904	Incumbent re-elected.	▌ ✓ Finis J. Garrett (Democratic) 79.02%; ▌B. C. Cochran (Republican) 20.65%; ▌D. E. McNeil (Socialist) 0.33%
Tennessee 10	Kenneth McKellar	Democratic	1911 (special)	Incumbent re-elected.	▌ ✓ Kenneth McKellar (Democratic) 94.32%; ▌George Pardue (Socialist) 5.68%

== Texas ==
District	Incumbent			This race	
District	Member	Party	First elected	Results	Candidates
Texas 1	Morris Sheppard	Democratic	1902	Incumbent retired to run for State Senate. Democratic hold.	▌ ✓ Horace W. Vaughan (Democratic) 85.93%; ▌S. L. Willyard (Socialist) 10.64%; ▌Josh Barker (Republican) 3.43%
Texas 2	Martin Dies	Democratic	1908	Incumbent re-elected	▌ ✓ Martin Dies (Democratic) 80.28%; ▌J. A. Freeland (Socialist) 13.74%; ▌Howard M. Smith (Republican) 3.47%; ▌E. G. Christian (Progressive) 2.51%
Texas 3	James Young	Democratic	1910	Incumbent re-elected	▌ ✓ James Young (Democratic) 96.61%; ▌B. F. Bryant (Unknown) 3.39%
Texas 4	Choice B. Randell	Democratic	1900	Incumbent retired to run for State Senate. Democratic hold.	▌ ✓ Sam Rayburn (Democratic) 89.55%; ▌C. E. Obsuchain (Republican) 8.63%; ▌G. J. Barlow (Socialist) 1.82%
Texas 5	James Andrew Beall	Democratic	1902	Incumbent re-elected	▌ ✓ James Andrew Beall (Democratic) 97.75%; ▌M. C. Scott (Unknown) 2.25%
Texas 6	Rufus Hardy	Democratic	1906	Incumbent re-elected	▌ ✓ Rufus Hardy (Democratic) 95.97%; ▌W. H. Wilson (Socialist) 4.03%
Texas 7	Alexander W. Gregg	Democratic	1902	Incumbent re-elected	▌ ✓ Alexander W. Gregg (Democratic) 100%
Texas 8	John M. Moore	Democratic	1905	Incumbent retired. Democratic hold.	▌ ✓ Joe H. Eagle (Democratic) 83.25%; ▌Jeff N. Miller (Republican) 10.03%; ▌J. E. Curd (Socialist) 6.72%
Texas 9	George F. Burgess	Democratic	1900	Incumbent re-elected	▌ ✓ George F. Burgess (Democratic) 100%
Texas 10	Albert S. Burleson	Democratic	1898	Incumbent re-elected	▌ ✓ Albert S. Burleson (Democratic) 100%
Texas 11	Robert L. Henry	Democratic	1896	Incumbent re-elected	▌ ✓ Robert L. Henry (Democratic) 98.15%; ▌C. G. Davidson (Socialist) 1.86%
Texas 12	Oscar Callaway	Democratic	1910	Incumbent re-elected	▌ ✓ Oscar Callaway (Democratic) 97.62%; ▌Clarence Nugent (Socialist) 2.38%
Texas 13	John H. Stephens	Democratic	1896	Incumbent re-elected	▌ ✓ John H. Stephens (Democratic) 89.15%; ▌L. B. Lindsey (Progressive) 5.76%; ▌H. H. Cooper (Republican) 5.1%
Texas 14	James L. Slayden	Democratic	1896	Incumbent re-elected	▌ ✓ James L. Slayden (Democratic) 97.48%; ▌Julius Real (Republican) 1.32%; ▌A. D. Zucht (Unknown) 1.2%
Texas 15	John Nance Garner	Democratic	1902	Incumbent re-elected	▌ ✓ John Nance Garner (Democratic) 100%
Texas 16	William R. Smith	Democratic	1902	Incumbent re-elected	▌ ✓ William R. Smith (Democratic) 100%
Texas at-large	None (new district)			New seat. Democratic gain.	▌ ✓ Daniel E. Garrett (Democratic)
Texas at-large	None (new district)			New seat. Democratic gain.	▌ ✓ Hatton W. Sumners (Democratic)

== Utah ==
The Utah election consisted of an all-party general ticket election to the two at-large seats. Howell was elected to the first at-large seat, while Johnson was elected to the second at-large seat, but they were nevertheless placed in districts.

District	Incumbent			This race	
District	Member	Party	First elected	Results	Candidates
Utah 1	Joseph Howell; Redistricted from the at-large seat	Republican	1902	Incumbent re-elected.	▌ ✓ Joseph Howell (Republican) 19.45%; ▌ ✓ Jacob Johnson (Republican) 18.96%; ▌Mathonihah Thomas (Democratic) 16.77%; ▌Tillman D. Johnson (Democratic) 16.52%; ▌S. H. Love (Progressive) 10.08%; ▌Lewis Larson (Progressive) 9.89%; ▌Murray E. King (Socialist) 4.05%; ▌William M. Knerr (Socialist) 4.04%; ▌Elias Anderson (Socialist Labor) 0.23%
Utah 2	None (new district)			New district. Republican gain.	▌ ✓ Joseph Howell (Republican) 19.45%; ▌ ✓ Jacob Johnson (Republican) 18.96%; ▌Mathonihah Thomas (Democratic) 16.77%; ▌Tillman D. Johnson (Democratic) 16.52%; ▌S. H. Love (Progressive) 10.08%; ▌Lewis Larson (Progressive) 9.89%; ▌Murray E. King (Socialist) 4.05%; ▌William M. Knerr (Socialist) 4.04%; ▌Elias Anderson (Socialist Labor) 0.23%

== Vermont ==
District	Incumbent			This race	
District	Member	Party	First elected	Results	Candidates
Vermont 1	Frank L. Greene	Republican	1912 (special)	Incumbent re-elected.	▌ ✓ Frank L. Greene (Republican) 59.7%; ▌Patrick M. Meldon (Democratic) 35.4%; ▌George L. Story (Prohibition) 3.1%; ▌John Spargo (Socialist) 1.8%
Vermont 2	Frank Plumley	Republican	1908	Incumbent re-elected.	▌ ✓ Frank Plumley (Republican) 57.9%; ▌Otis C. Sawyer (Democratic) 36.0%; ▌Chester E. Ordway (Socialist) 3.3%; ▌Elmer E. Phillips (Prohibition) 2.3%

== Virginia ==
District	Incumbent			This race	
District	Member	Party	First elected	Results	Candidates
Virginia 1	William A. Jones	Democratic	1890	Incumbent re-elected.	▌ ✓ William A. Jones (Democratic) 91.0%; ▌T. E. Coleman (Socialist) 6.6%; ▌Godfrey Kinder (Socialist Labor) 2.4%
Virginia 2	Edward E. Holland	Democratic	1910	Incumbent re-elected.	▌ ✓ Edward E. Holland (Democratic) 89.1%; ▌Nathaniel T. Green (Progressive) 9.9%; Others: ▌Isaiah A. Chesman (Unknown) 0.6%; ▌B. D. Downey (Socialist Labor) 0.4%
Virginia 3	John Lamb	Democratic	1896	Incumbent retired. Democratic hold.	▌ ✓ Andrew J. Montague (Democratic) 97.6%; ▌Chase A. Haight (Unknown) 1.4%; ▌H. Adolph Muller (Socialist Labor) 1.0%
Virginia 4	Robert Turnbull	Democratic	1910	Incumbent lost renomination. Democratic hold.	▌ ✓ Walter A. Watson (Democratic) 96.4%; ▌Fred Herzig (Socialist) 3.3%; ▌Robert Turnbull (Independent) 0.3%
Virginia 5	Edward W. Saunders	Democratic	1906 (special)	Incumbent re-elected.	▌ ✓ Edward W. Saunders (Democratic) 62.0%; ▌A. B. Hamner (Republican) 35.7%; ▌J. Celphas Shelton (Unknown) 2.3%
Virginia 6	Carter Glass	Democratic	1902 (special)	Incumbent re-elected.	▌ ✓ Carter Glass (Democratic) 72.8%; ▌James S. Browning (Progressive) 20.6%; ▌Adon A. Yoder (Unknown) 3.4%; ▌Jacob Harvey (Unknown) 3.3%
Virginia 7	James Hay	Democratic	1896	Incumbent re-elected.	▌ ✓ James Hay (Democratic) 71.5%; ▌George N. Earman (Republican) 25.3%; ▌E. C. Garrison (Socialist) 3.2%
Virginia 8	Charles C. Carlin	Democratic	1907 (special)	Incumbent re-elected.	▌ ✓ Charles C. Carlin (Democratic) 90.7%; ▌F. T. Evans (Socialist) 6.3%; ▌Milton Fling (Unknown) 3.0%
Virginia 9	C. Bascom Slemp	Republican	1907 (special)	Incumbent re-elected.	▌ ✓ C. Bascom Slemp (Republican) 50.0%; ▌R. A. Ayers (Democratic) 46.6%; ▌Walter Graham (Unknown) 3.4%
Virginia 10	Henry D. Flood	Democratic	1900	Incumbent re-elected.	▌ ✓ Henry D. Flood (Democratic) 74.4%; ▌E. J. McCulloch (Progressive) 19.0%; ▌Nathan Parkins (Socialist) 6.5%

== Washington ==
District	Incumbent			This race	
District	Member	Party	First elected	Results	Candidates
Washington 1	William E. Humphrey	Republican	1902	Incumbent re-elected.	▌ ✓ William E. Humphrey (Republican) 31.0%; ▌Daniel Landon (Progressive) 30.4%; ▌Charles G. Heifner (Democratic) 23.7%; ▌Joseph Gilbert (Socialist) 14.9%
Washington 2	Stanton Warburton	Republican	1910	Incumbent lost re-election as a Progressive. Republican hold.	▌ ✓ Albert Johnson (Republican) 32.5%; ▌Stanton Warburton (Progressive) 30.9%; ▌James A. Munday (Democratic) 21.4%; ▌Leslie E. Aller (Socialist) 15.3%
Washington 3	William La Follette	Republican	1910	Incumbent re-elected.	▌ ✓ William La Follette (Republican) 33.1%; ▌Roscoe M. Drumheller (Democratic) 29.4%; ▌Frank Goodwin (Progressive) 28.0%; ▌Robert B. Martin (Socialist) 9.6%
Washington at-large 2 seats on a general ticket	None (new seat)			New seat. Progressive gain.	▌ ✓ Jacob Falconer (Progressive) 16.1%; ▌ ✓ James W. Bryan (Progressive) 15.3%; ▌Henry B. Dewey (Republican) 14.8%; ▌J. E. Frost (Republican) 14.6%; ▌E. O. Connor (Democratic) 12.4%; ▌Henry M. White (Democratic) 12.2%; ▌M. E. Giles (Socialist) 6.7%; ▌Alfred Wagenknecht (Socialist) 6.6%; ▌N. A. Thompson (Prohibition) 1.4%
Washington at-large 2 seats on a general ticket	None (new seat)			New seat. Progressive gain.	▌ ✓ Jacob Falconer (Progressive) 16.1%; ▌ ✓ James W. Bryan (Progressive) 15.3%; ▌Henry B. Dewey (Republican) 14.8%; ▌J. E. Frost (Republican) 14.6%; ▌E. O. Connor (Democratic) 12.4%; ▌Henry M. White (Democratic) 12.2%; ▌M. E. Giles (Socialist) 6.7%; ▌Alfred Wagenknecht (Socialist) 6.6%; ▌N. A. Thompson (Prohibition) 1.4%

== West Virginia ==
District	Incumbent			This race	
District	Member	Party	First elected	Results	Candidates
West Virginia 1	John W. Davis	Democratic	1910	Incumbent re-elected.	▌ ✓ John W. Davis (Democratic) 44.97%; ▌George A. Laughlin (Republican) 44.67%; ▌Mathew S. Holt (Socialist) 7.68%; ▌L. E. Peters (Prohibition) 2.69%
West Virginia 2	William G. Brown Jr.	Democratic	1910	Incumbent re-elected.	▌ ✓ William G. Brown Jr. (Democratic) 47.32%; ▌William G. Conley (Republican) 47.29%; ▌Edgar L. Smith (Socialist) 3.98%; ▌James C. Gibson (Prohibition) 1.41%
West Virginia 3	Adam Brown Littlepage	Democratic	1910	Incumbent lost re-election. Republican gain.	▌ ✓ Samuel B. Avis (Republican) 46.09%; ▌Adam Brown Littlepage (Democratic) 43.49%; ▌L. C. Rogers (Socialist) 9.14%; ▌J. L. Ryan (Prohibition) 1.29%
West Virginia 4	John M. Hamilton	Democratic	1910	Incumbent lost re-election. Republican gain.	▌ ✓ Hunter H. Moss Jr. (Republican) 50.23%; ▌John M. Hamilton (Democratic) 47.53%; ▌Arthur Hank (Prohibition) 1.29%; ▌Herbert O. Davis (Socialist) 1.07%
West Virginia 5	James A. Hughes	Republican	1900	Incumbent re-elected.	▌ ✓ James A. Hughes (Republican) 51.92%; ▌James F. Beaver (Democratic) 43.41%; ▌G. W. Gillespie (Socialist) 3.87%; ▌B. H. White (Prohibition) 0.81%
West Virginia at-large	None (new seat)			New seat. Republican gain.	▌ ✓ Howard Sutherland (Republican) 49.73%; ▌Ben H. Hiner (Democratic) 42.93%; ▌William A. Peter (Socialist) 5.73%; ▌Squire Halstead (Prohibition) 1.62%

== Wisconsin ==
District	Incumbent			This race	
District	Member	Party	First elected	Results	Candidates
Wisconsin 1	Henry Allen Cooper	Republican	1890	Incumbent re-elected.	▌ ✓ Henry Allen Cooper (Republican) 53.2%; ▌Calvin Stewart (Democratic) 38.8%; ▌Joseph Orth (Soc. Dem.) 4.3%; ▌Marcus S. Kellogg (Prohibition) 3.7%
Wisconsin 2	Michael E. Burke; Redistricted from the 6th district.	Democratic	1910	Incumbent re-elected.	▌ ✓ Michael E. Burke (Democratic) 55.2%; ▌Henry J. Grell (Republican) 39.3%; ▌Edward D. Deuss (Soc. Dem.) 4.0%; ▌Will Mack (Prohibition) 1.4%
Wisconsin 3	Arthur W. Kopp	Republican	1908	Incumbent retired. Republican loss.	▌ ✓ John M. Nelson (Republican) 52.9%; ▌Albert H. Long (Democratic) 43.0%; ▌Charles H. Berryman (Prohibition) 2.9%; ▌William E. Middleton (Soc. Dem.) 1.2%
Wisconsin 3	John M. Nelson; Redistricted from the 2nd district	Republican	1906	Incumbent re-elected.	▌ ✓ John M. Nelson (Republican) 52.9%; ▌Albert H. Long (Democratic) 43.0%; ▌Charles H. Berryman (Prohibition) 2.9%; ▌William E. Middleton (Soc. Dem.) 1.2%
Wisconsin 4	William J. Cary	Republican	1906	Incumbent re-elected as a Democrat. Democratic gain.	▌ ✓ William J. Cary (Democratic) 44.9% (Note: William J. Cary was nominated by the Democratic Party in 1912 as part of a fusion ticket opposed to the socialists, but he caucused as a progressive Republican before and after the election and ran for Congress three more times as a Republican after this.); ▌Winfield Gaylord (Soc. Dem.) 32.6%; ▌John M. Beffel (Republican) 20.9%; ▌William R. Nethercut (Prohibition) 1.6%
Wisconsin 5	Victor L. Berger	Social; Democratic	1910	Incumbent lost re-election. Republican gain.	▌ ✓ William H. Stafford (Republican) 41.3%; ▌Victor L. Berger (Soc. Dem.) 36.3%; ▌James F. Trottman (Republican) 21.4%; ▌Augustus C. Forster (Prohibition) 1.1%
Wisconsin 6	James H. Davidson; Redistricted from the 8th district	Republican	1896	Incumbent lost re-election. Democratic gain.	▌ ✓ Michael K. Reilly (Democratic) 48.7%; ▌James H. Davidson (Republican) 45.1%; ▌Martin Georgenson (Soc. Dem.) 4.8%; ▌Frank L. Smith (Prohibition) 1.5%
Wisconsin 7	John J. Esch	Republican	1898	Incumbent re-elected.	▌ ✓ John J. Esch (Republican) 61.0%; ▌William Coffland (Democratic) 32.8%; ▌Burton S. Hawley (Prohibition) 2.7%; ▌C. A. Noetzelman (Soc. Dem.) 2.4%
Wisconsin 8	None (new district)			New seat. Republican gain.	▌ ✓ Edward E. Browne (Republican) 54.6%; ▌Arthur J. Plowman (Democratic) 39.2%; ▌Curtis A. Boorman (Soc. Dem.) 4.0%; ▌Adolph R. Bucknam (Prohibition) 2.2%
Wisconsin 9	Thomas F. Konop	Democratic	1910	Incumbent re-elected.	▌ ✓ Thomas F. Konop (Democratic) 48.5%; ▌Elmer A. Morse (Republican) 46.4%; ▌James Oliver (Soc. Dem.) 3.3%; ▌Jason L. Sizer (Prohibition) 1.8%
Wisconsin 9	Elmer A. Morse; Redistricted from the 10th district	Republican	1906	Incumbent lost re-election. Republican loss.	▌ ✓ Thomas F. Konop (Democratic) 48.5%; ▌Elmer A. Morse (Republican) 46.4%; ▌James Oliver (Soc. Dem.) 3.3%; ▌Jason L. Sizer (Prohibition) 1.8%
Wisconsin 10	None (new district)			New seat. Republican gain.	▌ ✓ James A. Frear (Republican) 65.0%; ▌Charles Donohue (Democratic) 28.7%; ▌Albert Slaughter (Soc. Dem.) 3.4%; ▌Beverly White (Prohibition) 2.8%
Wisconsin 11	Irvine Lenroot	Republican	1908	Incumbent re-elected.	▌ ✓ Irvine Lenroot (Republican) 59.6%; ▌Henry A. Johnson (Democratic) 27.3%; ▌Ellis B. Harris (Soc. Dem.) 10.7%; ▌David W. Emerson (Prohibition) 2.5%

== Wyoming ==
District	Incumbent			This race	
District	Member	Party	First elected	Results	Candidates
Wyoming at-large	Frank W. Mondell	Republican	1898	Incumbent re-elected.	▌ ✓ Frank W. Mondell (Republican) 46.43%; ▌Thomas Fahey (Democratic) 35.73%; ▌Charles E. Winter (Progressive) 11.72%; ▌Anthony Carlson (Socialist) 5.41%; ▌Lemuel L. Laughlin (Prohibition) 0.72%

== Non-voting delegates ==
=== Alaska Territory ===
Alaska Territory elected its non-voting delegate on August 13, 1912.

District	Incumbent			This race	
District	Member	Party	First elected	Results	Candidates
Alaska Territory at-large	James Wickersham	Republican	1908	Incumbent re-elected as a Progressive. Progressive gain.	▌ ✓ James Wickersham (Progressive) 40.57%; ▌William A. Gilmore (Republican) 21.02%; ▌Kazis Krauczunas (Socialist) 20.54%; ▌Robert W. Jennings (Democratic) 14.28%

=== Hawaii Territory ===
District	Incumbent			This race	
District	Member	Party	First elected	Results	Candidates
Hawaii Territory at-large	Jonah Kūhiō Kalanianaʻole	Republican	1902	Incumbent re-elected.	▌ ✓ Jonah Kūhiō Kalanianaʻole (Republican) 52.65%; ▌Lincoln L. McCandless (Democratic) 43.25%; ▌C. K. Notley (Home Rule) 2.59%; ▌Clark (Socialist) 1.51%

== See also ==
- 1912 United States elections
  - 1912 United States presidential election
  - 1912–13 United States Senate elections
- 62nd United States Congress
- 63rd United States Congress

== Bibliography ==
- Dubin, Michael J. (March 1, 1998). United States Congressional Elections, 1788-1997: The Official Results of the Elections of the 1st Through 105th Congresses. McFarland and Company. ISBN 978-0786402830.
- Martis, Kenneth C. (January 1, 1989). The Historical Atlas of Political Parties in the United States Congress, 1789-1989. Macmillan Publishing Company. ISBN 978-0029201701.
- Moore, John L., ed. (1994). Congressional Quarterly's Guide to U.S. Elections (Third ed.). Congressional Quarterly Inc. ISBN 978-0871879967.
- "Party Divisions of the House of Representatives* 1789–Present". Office of the Historian, United States House of Representatives.
