= Thomas S. Crago =

American politician (1866–1925)

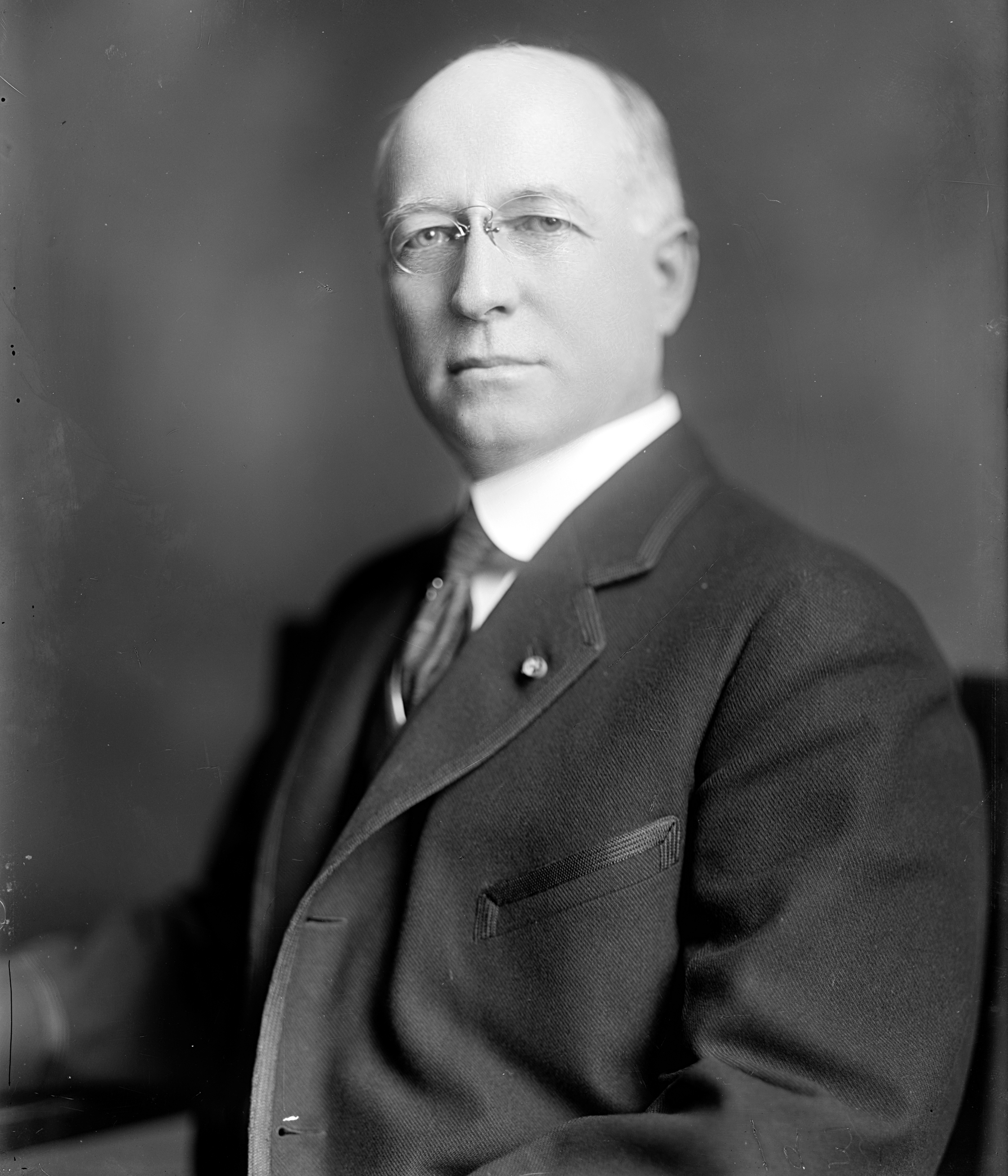
Crago, 1905–1925

Thomas Spencer Crago (August 8, 1866 – September 12, 1925) was a Republican member of the U.S. House of Representatives from Pennsylvania.

Thomas S. Crago was born in Carmichaels, Pennsylvania. He attended Greene Academy and Waynesburg College. He graduated from Princeton College in 1893. He studied law, and was admitted to the bar of Greene County, Pennsylvania in 1894 and commenced practice in Waynesburg, Pennsylvania.

He served as captain of Company K in the Tenth Pennsylvania Volunteer Infantry during the Spanish–American War and the Philippine–American War. After the war helped to reorganize the Pennsylvania National Guard and was elected major and later lieutenant colonel of the Tenth Infantry (later reorganized into the 110th Infantry Regiment). He resigned his commission while in Congress but was later retired with the rank of colonel. He was a delegate to the 1904 Republican National Convention.

Crago was elected as a Republican to the Sixty-second Congress. He was an unsuccessful candidate for reelection in 1912. He served as commander in chief of the Veterans of Foreign Wars in 1914 and 1915.

He was again elected to the Sixty-fourth, Sixty-fifth, and Sixty-sixth Congresses. He was not a candidate for renomination in 1920, but was subsequently elected to the Sixty-seventh Congress to fill the vacancy caused by the death of Mahlon M. Garland. He was not a candidate for renomination in 1922.

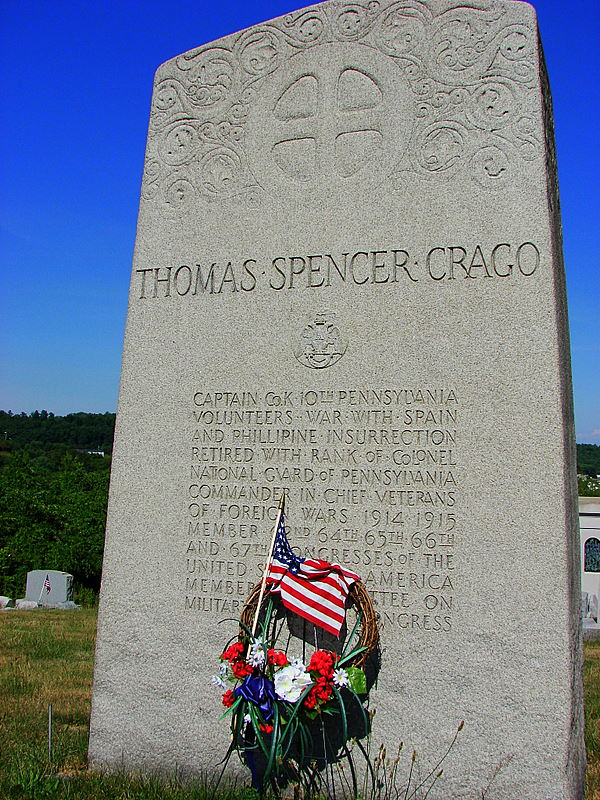
Crago's gravesite

He was appointed special assistant to the Attorney General of the United States on March 7, 1923, and was assigned to the War Frauds Division. He resigned August 15, 1924. He served as vice president of the Union Deposit & Trust Co. of Waynesburg, Pennsylvania.

He died in Waynesburg, aged 59, and interred in Green Mount Cemetery.

U.S. House of Representatives
Preceded by Allen F. Cooper	Member of the U.S. House of Representatives from Pennsylvania's 23rd congressional district 1911–1913	Succeeded by Wooda N. Carr
Preceded by Fred E. Lewis, John M. Morin, Anderson H. Walters, Arthur R. Rupley	Member of the U.S. House of Representatives from Pennsylvania's at-large congressional district 1915–1917 alongside: Daniel F. Lafean, John R. K. Scott, Mahlon M. Garland; 1917–1919 alongside: John R. K. Scott, Joseph McLaughlin, Mahlon M. Garland; 1919–1921 alongside: Anderson H. Walters, William J. Burke, Mahlon M. Garland	Succeeded by Anderson H. Walters, William J. Burke, Joseph McLaughlin
Preceded by Mahlon M. Garland	Member of the U.S. House of Representatives from Pennsylvania's at-large congressional district September 20, 1921 – March 3, 1923 alongside: Anderson H. Walters, William J. Burke, Joseph McLaughlin	Succeeded by 33rd: M. Clyde Kelly; 34th: John M. Morin; 35th: James M. Magee; 36th: Guy E. Campbell
