= James M. Magee =

American politician

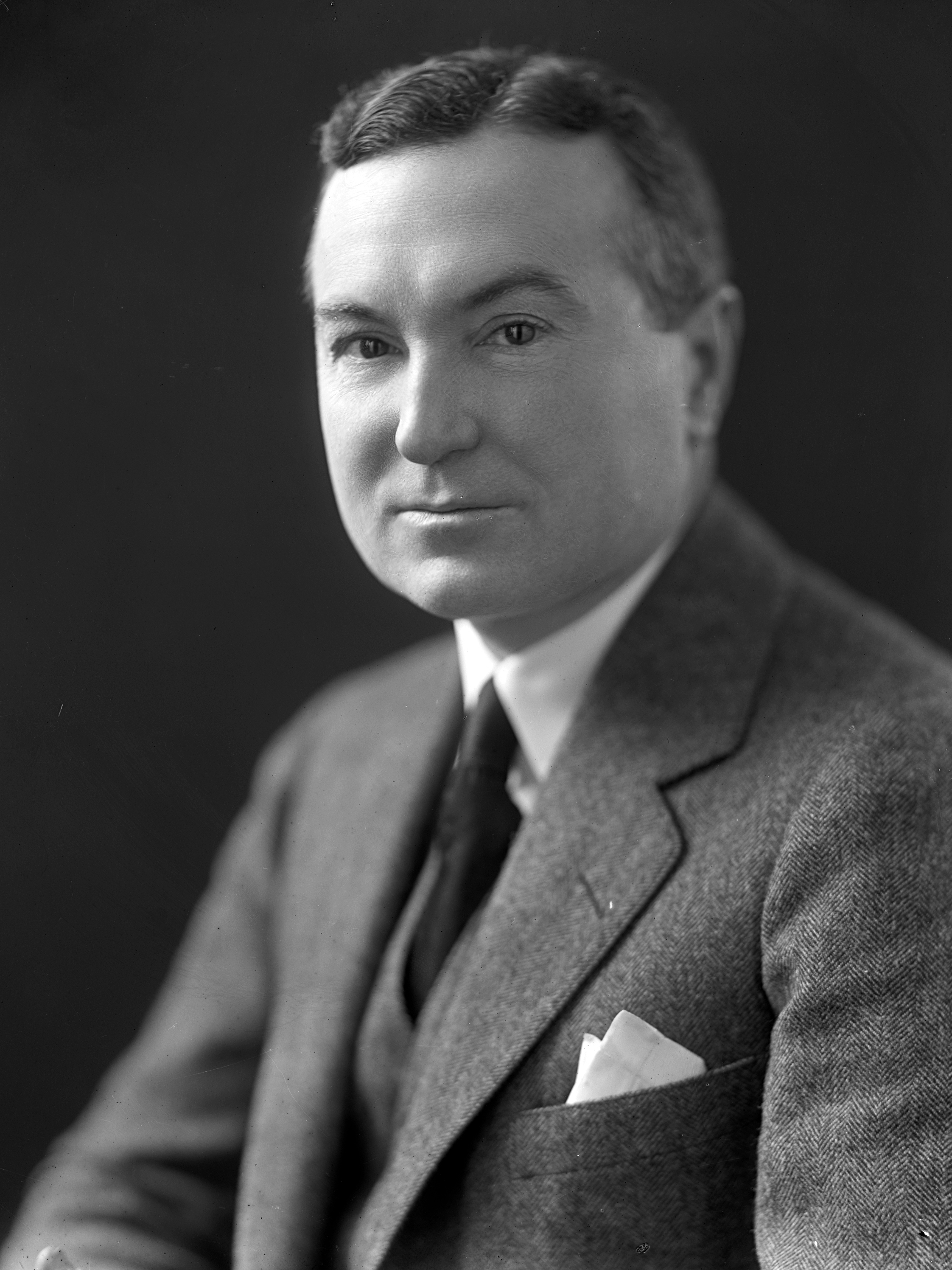
Harris & Ewing photo, Library of Congress

James McDevitt Magee (April 5, 1877 – April 16, 1949) was an aviator and a Republican member of the U.S. House of Representatives from Pennsylvania.

== Biography ==
James M. Magee was born in Evergreen, Pennsylvania (near Pittsburgh, Pennsylvania). He graduated from Yale University in 1899, where he was a member of Skull and Bones, and from the law department of the University of Pennsylvania at Philadelphia in 1902. He was admitted to the bar in 1903 and commenced practice in Pittsburgh. He was commissioned a first lieutenant in the United States Army Air Service during the First World War. He was promoted to captain and served until January 1919. He was later commissioned a lieutenant colonel in the Reserve. During his entire period of service he was attached to the executive office of the Department of Military Aeronautics.

Magee was elected as a Republican to the Sixty-eighth and Sixty-ninth Congresses. He was an unsuccessful candidate for renomination in 1926. He served as chairman of the Pennsylvania Securities Commission in Harrisburg, Pennsylvania, from 1931 to 1935. He continued the practice of law in Pittsburgh until his death there. Magee was interred in Allegheny Cemetery in Pittsburgh.

Magee was brother of missionary John Magee, and uncle to John Gillespie Magee, Jr., author of the poem "High Flight."

U.S. House of Representatives
| Preceded by at-large: William J. Burke, Thomas S. Crago, Joseph McLaughlin, Anderson H. Walters | Member of the U.S. House of Representatives from Pennsylvania's 35th congressional district 1923–1927 | Succeeded by Harry A. Estep |
