= Fred E. Lewis =

American politician

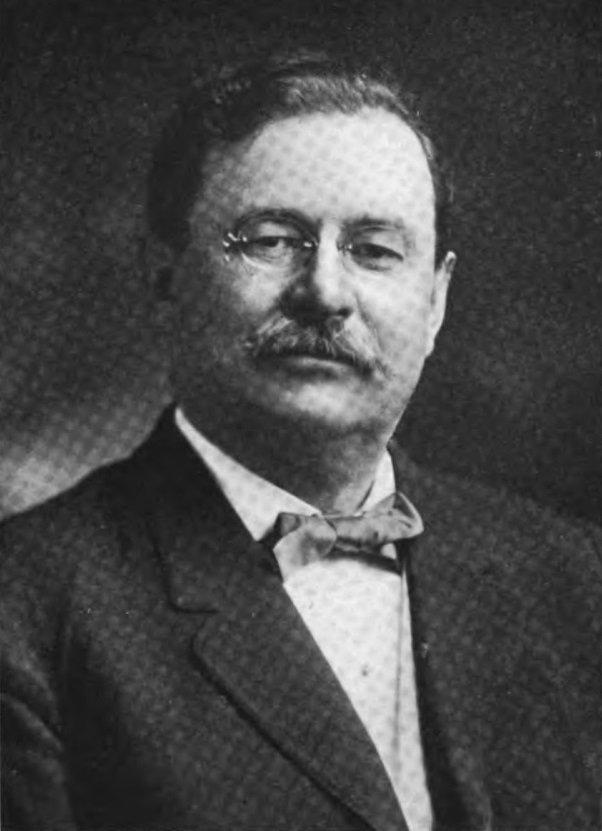
- Lewis in December 1917

Member of the U.S. House of Representatives from Pennsylvania's at-large congressional district
- In office March 4, 1913 – March 3, 1915; Alongside: John M. Morin, Anderson H. Walters, Arthur R. Rupley
- Preceded by: District established
- Succeeded by: John R.K. Scott, Thomas S. Crago, Daniel F. Lafean, Mahlon M. Garland

Mayor of Allentown, Pennsylvania
- In office 1896–1899
- Preceded by: Henry Willard Allison
- Succeeded by: James L. Schaadt
- In office 1902–1905
- Preceded by: James L. Schaadt
- Succeeded by: Dr. Alfred J. Yost
- In office 1932–1936
- Preceded by: Malcolm W. Gross
- Succeeded by: Malcolm W. Gross

Personal details
- Born: February 8, 1865 Allentown, Pennsylvania, U.S.
- Died: June 27, 1949 (aged 84) Allentown, Pennsylvania, U.S.

Fred Ewing Lewis (February 8, 1865 – June 27, 1949) was a Republican member of the U.S. House of Representatives from Pennsylvania.

== Early life and education ==
Fred Ewing Lewis was born in Allentown, Pennsylvania on February 8, 1865. He attended the Collegiate and Commercial Institute in New Haven, Connecticut, and Muhlenberg College in Allentown. After studying law, he was admitted to the bar in 1888, and began the practice of his profession in Allentown.

== Career ==
He served as mayor of Allentown in 1896 and 1902. He organized and was president of the Merchants' National Bank and was president of the Dime Savings & Trust Co. in Allentown.

Lewis was elected as a Republican to the Sixty-third Congress. After his time in Congress, he resumed his profession and also engaged in banking.

He then served again as mayor of Allentown from 1932 to 1936.

== Death ==
Lewis died in Allentown on June 27, 1949, at age 84, and was interred in that city's Union-West End Cemetery.

U.S. House of Representatives
Preceded by None	Member of the U.S. House of Representatives from Pennsylvania's at-large congressional district 1913–1915 alongside: Anderson H. Walters, John M. Morin, Arthur R. Rupley	Succeeded by Thomas S. Crago, John R.K. Scott, Daniel F. Lafean, Mahlon M. Garland
