= John M. Morin =

American politician

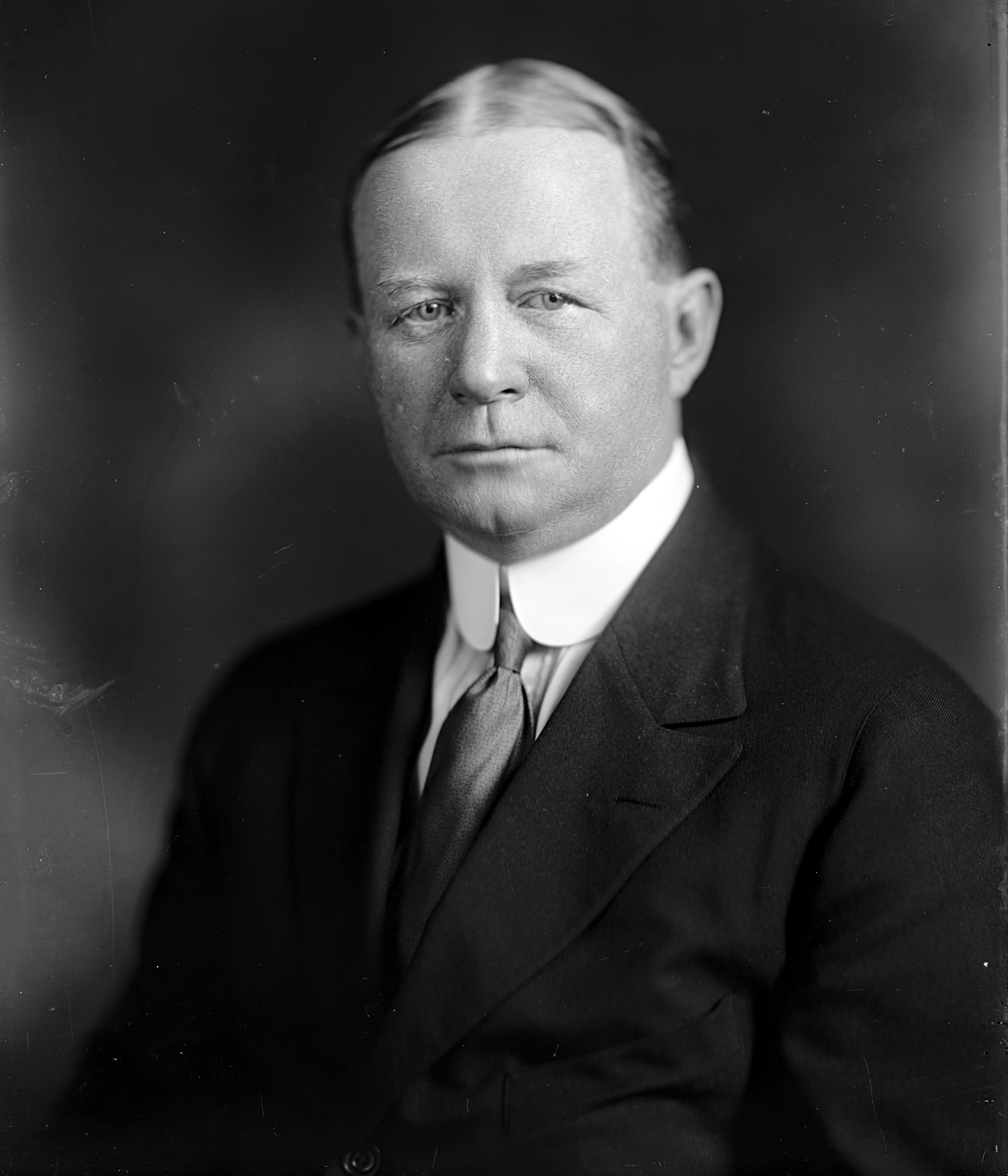
John M. Morin

John Mary Morin (April 18, 1868 – March 3, 1942) was a Republican member of the United States House of Representatives for Pennsylvania.

== Biography ==
Morin was born in Philadelphia, Pennsylvania, but moved with his parents to Pittsburgh. He began working in a glass factory in 1882, and was employed in steel mills until 1885. In 1889, he moved to Missoula, Montana and engaged in mercantile pursuits, during which time he took a night course at the Haskins' Business College in Missoula. After graduating from college in 1892, he returned to Pittsburgh and became engaged in the hotel business. He became a director of the Washington Trust Company in 1910. He served as a member of the Pittsburgh Common Council from 1904 to 1906. He was a delegate to the Republican State conventions from 1905 to 1912, and director of Public Safety in Pittsburgh from 1909 to 1913.

Morin was elected in 1912 as a Republican to the 63rd United States Congress, and served eight terms. He was Chairman of the United States House Committee on Military Affairs in the 69th and 70th Congresses. He was an unsuccessful candidate for renomination in 1928. He was appointed a commissioner of United States Employees' Compensation Commission in Washington, D.C., and served from 1928 until his death at age 73.

A long-time member of the Fraternal Order of Eagles, he served as Grand Worthy (International) President of the fraternity in 1920–21. He died in Marine Hospital in Baltimore, Maryland.

Anecdotes about Morin, and correspondence by his family during World War II, can be found in a book written by his grandson, Love and War as Never Before.

U.S. House of Representatives
Preceded by None	Member of the U.S. House of Representatives from Pennsylvania's at-large congressional district 1913–1915 alongside: Anderson H. Walters, Fred E. Lewis, Arthur R. Rupley	Succeeded by At-large: Thomas S. Crago, John R. K. Scott, Daniel F. Lafean, Mahlon M. Garland
Preceded by James F. Burke	Member of the U.S. House of Representatives from Pennsylvania's 31st congressional district 1915–1923	Succeeded by Adam M. Wyant
Preceded by At-large: William J. Burke, Thomas S. Crago, Joseph McLaughlin, Anderson H. Walters	Member of the U.S. House of Representatives from Pennsylvania's 34th congressional district 1923–1929	Succeeded by Patrick J. Sullivan
