= Arthur Ringwalt Rupley =

American politician

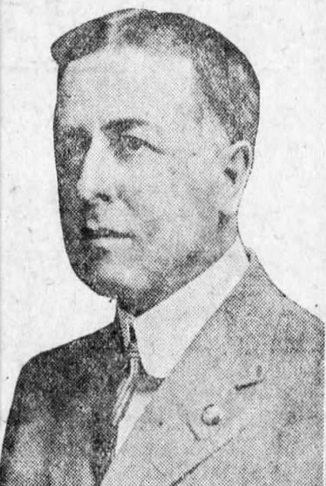

Member of the U.S. House of Representatives
- In office March 4, 1913 – March 4, 1915
- Constituency: Pennsylvania's at-large congressional district

Personal details
- Born: November 13, 1868 West Fairview, Pennsylvania, U.S.
- Died: October 23, 1920 (aged 51) Carlisle, Pennsylvania, U.S.
- Party: Republican
- Education: Dickinson School of Law
- Occupation: Lawyer, politician

Arthur Ringwalt Rupley (November 13, 1868 – October 23, 1920) was a Republican member of the U.S. House of Representatives from Pennsylvania.

== Biography ==
Arthur R. Rupley was born in West Fairview, Pennsylvania. He attended the Harrisburg Academy and the Cumberland Valley State Normal School in Shippensburg, Pennsylvania.

He graduated from the Dickinson School of Law in Carlisle, Pennsylvania in 1890, and was admitted to the bar in 1891.

He served as chairman of the Republican Party's county committee from 1895 to 1898 and as district attorney of Cumberland County, Pennsylvania, from 1895 to 1899. A county and city solicitor from 1900 to 1906, he was appointed as a delegate to the Republican State convention in 1910 and to the Republican National Convention in 1912.

Rupley was elected as a Republican to the Sixty-third Congress. After completing his tenure, he resumed the practice of law and specialized in public-service work.

== Death and interment ==
Rupley died in Carlisle from Bright's disease on October 23, 1920, and was interred in the Ashland Cemetery.

U.S. House of Representatives
Preceded by None	Member of the U.S. House of Representatives from Pennsylvania's at-large congressional district 1913–1915 alongside: Fred E. Lewis, John M. Morin, Anderson H. Walters	Succeeded by At-large: Thomas S. Crago, John R. K. Scott, Daniel F. Lafean, Mahlon M. Garland
