= Guy E. Campbell =

American politician

Guy Edgar Campbell
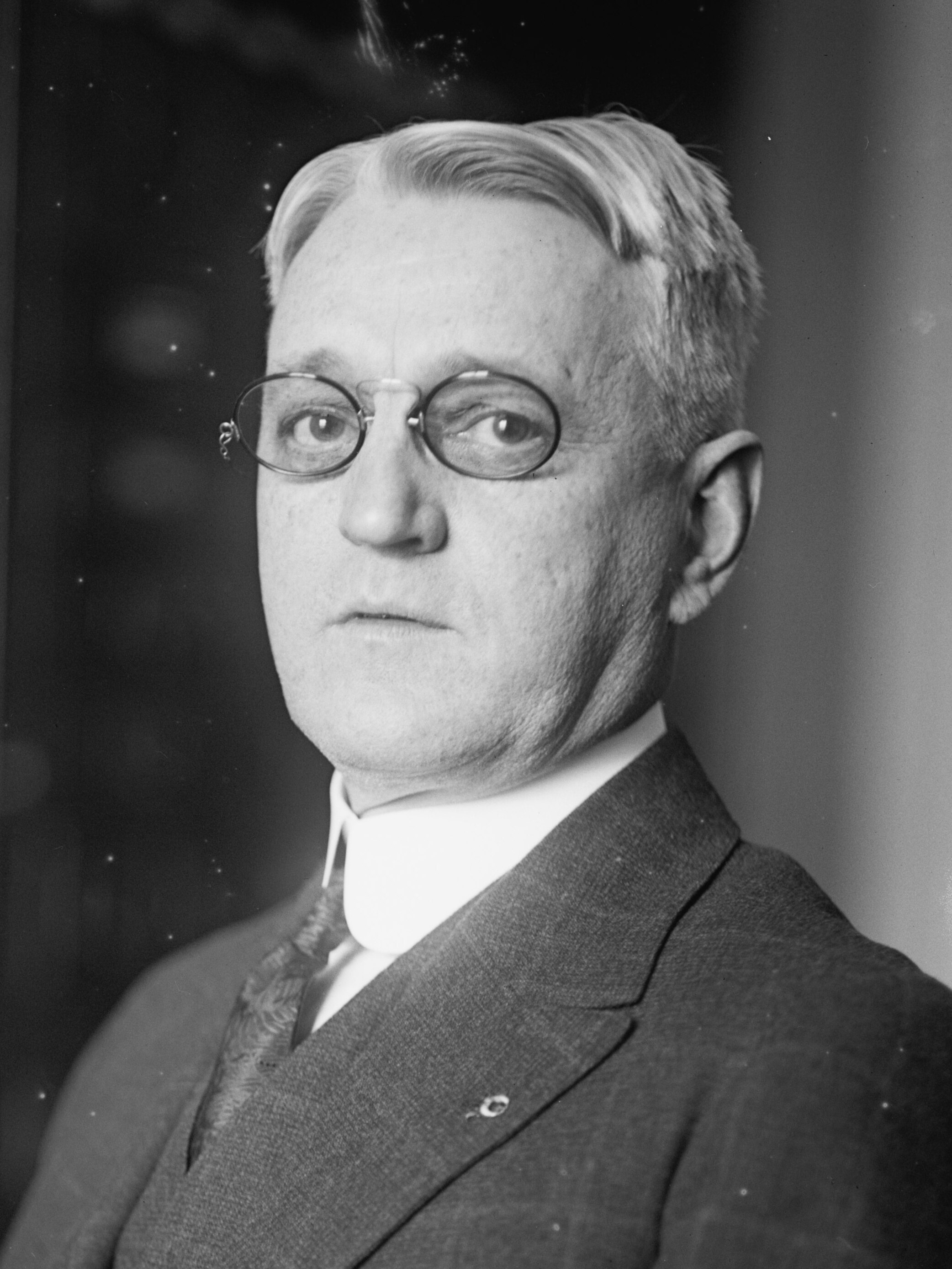

Member of the U.S. House of Representatives from Pennsylvania
- In office March 4, 1917 – March 3, 1933
- Preceded by: Andrew J. Barchfeld
- Succeeded by: District eliminated
- Constituency: 32nd district (1917–1923); 36th district (1923–1933)

Personal details
- Born: October 9, 1871 Fetterman, West Virginia, U.S.
- Died: February 17, 1940 (aged 68) Willoughby, Ohio, U.S.
- Party: Democratic (until 1923); Republican (from 1923)

Guy Edgar Campbell (October 9, 1871 – February 17, 1940) was a Democratic and Republican member of the U.S. House of Representatives from Pennsylvania.

== Early life and education ==
Campbell was born in Fetterman, West Virginia. His father was an immigrant from Scotland. In 1889, he moved to Pennsylvania with his parents, who moved to Pittsburgh, in 1889, and to Crafton, Pennsylvania, in 1893. He attended Iron City Business College in Pittsburgh. His brother Otto C Campbell, 10 years his junior, served as Street Commissioner of Crafton Borough.

== Career ==
Campbell was employed as a clerk in the offices of the Baltimore and Ohio Railroad in Pittsburgh, until June 1896, when he resigned. He was engaged in the general insurance business in Pittsburgh until 1903. He was interested in the production of oil and gas in Pennsylvania and West Virginia.

== U.S. House of Representatives ==
Campbell was elected as a Democrat to the Sixty-fifth, Sixty-sixth, and Sixty-seventh Congresses, and as a Republican to the Sixty-eighth and to the four succeeding Congresses. He served as the Chairman of the United States House Committee on Expenditures in the Department of Labor during the Sixty-eighth Congress. He was an unsuccessful candidate for reelection in 1932. He became engaged in an advisory capacity in Washington, D.C.

== Death ==
He died at Willoughby, Ohio, and is interred in Union Dale Cemetery in Pittsburgh.

== Sources ==
- United States Congress. "Guy E. Campbell (id: C000084)". Biographical Directory of the United States Congress.
- The Political Graveyard: Index to Politicians: Campbell, G to I at politicalgraveyard.com The Political Graveyard]

U.S. House of Representatives
Preceded by Andrew J. Barchfeld	Member of the U.S. House of Representatives from Pennsylvania's 32nd congressional district 1917–1923	Succeeded by Stephen G. Porter
Preceded by at-large: Joseph McLaughlin, Anderson H. Walters, William J. Burke, Thomas S. Crago	Member of the U.S. House of Representatives from Pennsylvania's 36th congressional district 1923–1933	Succeeded by District Eliminated
