= 66th United States Congress =

1919-1921 U.S. Congress

←	65th	67th	→
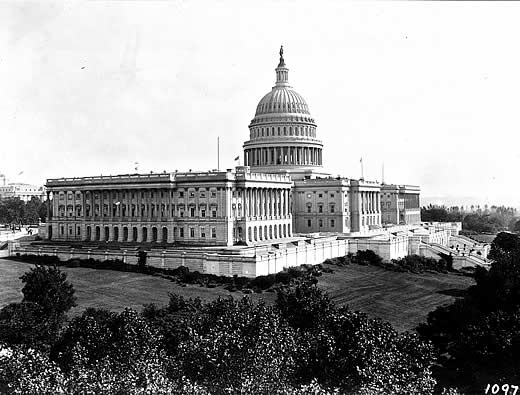
- United States Capitol (1906)

Overview
- Legislative body: United States Congress
- Jurisdiction: United States
- Term: March 4, 1919 – March 4, 1921

Senate
- Members: 96
- President: Thomas R. Marshall (D)
- President pro tempore: Albert B. Cummins (R)
- Party control: Republican

House of Representatives
- Members: 435 representatives 5 non-voting delegates
- Speaker: Frederick H. Gillett (R)
- Party control: Republican

Sessions
- 1st: May 19, 1919 – November 19, 1919
- 2nd: December 1, 1919 – June 5, 1920
- 3rd: December 6, 1920 – March 3, 1921

The 66th United States Congress was a meeting of the legislative branch of the United States federal government, comprising the United States Senate and the United States House of Representatives. It met in Washington, D.C., from March 4, 1919, to March 4, 1921, during the last two years of Woodrow Wilson's presidency. The apportionment of seats in the House of Representatives was based on the 1910 United States census.

The Republicans won majorities in both the House and the Senate, thus taking control of both chambers.

It was the last congress to have had no female members of Congress in the House of Representatives and thus the last time there was an all-male congress. (Note: Several subsequent congresses, up to the 96th Congress, would have periods with no women in the Senate but several in the House.)

== Major events ==
A brief special session was called by President Wilson in March 1919, because of a filibuster that had successfully blocked appropriations bills needed to fund day-to-day government operations.

- April 30, 1919: First wave of the 1919 United States anarchist bombings.
- June 2, 1919: The home of Attorney General Palmer was bombed in the second wave of anarchist bombings.
- June 15, 1919: Pancho Villa attacked Ciudad Juárez. When the bullets begin to fly to the U.S. side of the border, 2 units of the U.S. 7th Cavalry Regiment crossed the border and repulse Villa's forces.
- July 19–23, 1919: Race riot in Washington, D.C.
- August 31, 1919: The Communist Party of the United States was established
- September 9, 1919: Boston Police Strike
- September 22, 1919: Steel strike of 1919
- October 2, 1919: President Woodrow Wilson suffered a massive stroke, leaving him partially paralyzed
- November 1, 1919: Coal Strike of 1919
- November 7, 1919: First of the Palmer Raids during the First Red Scare
- January 2, 1920: Second of the Palmer Raids during the First Red Scare
- January 16, 1920: Prohibition, went into effect in the United States
- March 1, 1920: United States Railroad Administration returned control of American railroads to its constituent railroad companies
- May 7–8, 1920: Louis Freeland Post appeared before the House Committee on Rules, effectively ending Attorney General Palmer's presidential aspirations.
- November 2, 1920: Warren G. Harding defeated James M. Cox in the 1920 United States presidential election

== Major legislation ==
- June 30, 1919: Navy Appropriations Act of 1919
- June 30, 1919: Hastings Amendment
- July 11, 1919: Anti-Lobbying Act of 1919
- July 11, 1919: Army Appropriations Act of 1919
- July 19, 1919: Sundry Civil Expenses Appropriations Act
- October 18, 1919: National Prohibition Act (Volstead Act), ch. 85, 41 Stat. 305
- October 22, 1919: Underground Water Act of 1919
- October 29, 1919: National Motor Vehicle Theft Act (Dyer Act)
- November 4, 1919: Deficiency Act of 1919
- November 6, 1919: Indian Soldier Act of 1919
- December 24, 1919: Edge Act of 1919
- February 25, 1920: Oil Leasing Act of 1920
- February 25, 1920: Mineral Leasing Act of 1920 (Smoot-Sinnot Act), ch. 85, 41 Stat. 437
- February 25, 1920: Pipeline Rights-of-Way Act
- February 25, 1920: Sale of Water For Miscellaneous Purposes Act
- February 28, 1920: Esch-Cummins Act, Pub. L. 66–152, 41 Stat. 456
- March 9, 1920: Suits in Admiralty Act of 1920
- March 15, 1920: Military Surplus Act of 1920 (Kahn-Wadsworth Act)
- March 30, 1920: Death on the High Seas Act of 1920
- April 13, 1920: Phelan Act of 1920
- May 1, 1920: Fuller Act of 1920
- May 10, 1920: Deportation Act of 1920
- May 18, 1920: Kinkaid Act of 1920
- May 20, 1920: Sale of Surplus Improved Public Lands Act
- May 22, 1920: Civil Service Retirement Act of 1920
- May 29, 1920: Independent Treasury Act of 1920
- June 2, 1920: Industry Vocational Rehabilitation Act of 1920 (Smith-Bankhead Act)
- June 2, 1920: Civilian Vocational Rehabilitation Act of 1920 (Smith-Fess Act)
- June 2, 1920: National Park Criminal Jurisdiction Act
- June 4, 1920: National Defense Act of 1920 (Kahn Act)
- June 5, 1920: Sills Act of 1920
- June 5, 1920: Merchant Marine Act of 1920 (Jones Act)
- June 5, 1920: Women's Bureau Act of 1920
- June 5, 1920: Ship Mortgage Act of 1920
- June 5, 1920: River and Harbors Act of 1920
- June 5, 1920: Federal Water Power Act of 1920 (Esch Act)
- January 4, 1921: War Finance Corporation Act of 1921
- March 3, 1921: Patent Act of 1921 (Nolan Act)
- March 3, 1921: Federal Water Power Act Amendment (Jones-Esch Act)

== Constitutional amendments ==
- January 16, 1919: Eighteenth Amendment to the United States Constitution, declaring the production, transport, and sale of alcohol (though not the consumption or private possession) illegal, was ratified by the requisite number of states (then 36) to become part of the Constitution
  - Amendment later repealed on December 5, 1933, by the Twenty-first Amendment to the United States Constitution
- June 4, 1919: Approved the Nineteenth Amendment to the U.S. Constitution prohibiting the states and the federal government from denying the right to vote to citizens of the United States on the basis of sex, and submitted it to the state legislatures for ratification
- August 18, 1920: The Nineteenth Amendment to the United States Constitution was ratified by the requisite number of states (then 36) to become part of the Constitution

== Treaties ==
- March 19, 1920: Senate refused to ratify Treaty of Versailles

== Party summary ==
=== Senate ===
Senate membership

Beginning of the Congress

Ending of the Congress

	Party (shading shows control)		Total	Vacant
	Democratic (D)	Republican (R)	Total	Vacant
End of previous congress	51	45	96	0
Begin	47	49	96	0
End	46	50	96	0
Final voting share	47.9%	52.1%		
Beginning of next congress	37	59	96	0

=== House of Representatives ===
	Party (shading shows control)							Total	Vacant
	Democratic (D)	Socialist (Soc.)	Farmer- Labor (FL)	Republican (R)	Independent Republican (IR)	Prohibition (Proh.)	Other	Total	Vacant
End of previous congress	211	1	0	212	0	1	3 (Note: Progressive)	428	7
Begin	191	1	1	238	0	1	0	432	3
End	187	0	1	238	1	1	0	428	7
Final voting share	43.7%	0.0%	0.2%	55.6%	0.2%	0.2%	0.0%		
Beginning of next congress	131	1	0	299	1	0	0	432	3

House membership

Beginning of the Congress

Ending of the Congress

== Leadership ==
=== Senate leadership ===
Senate president

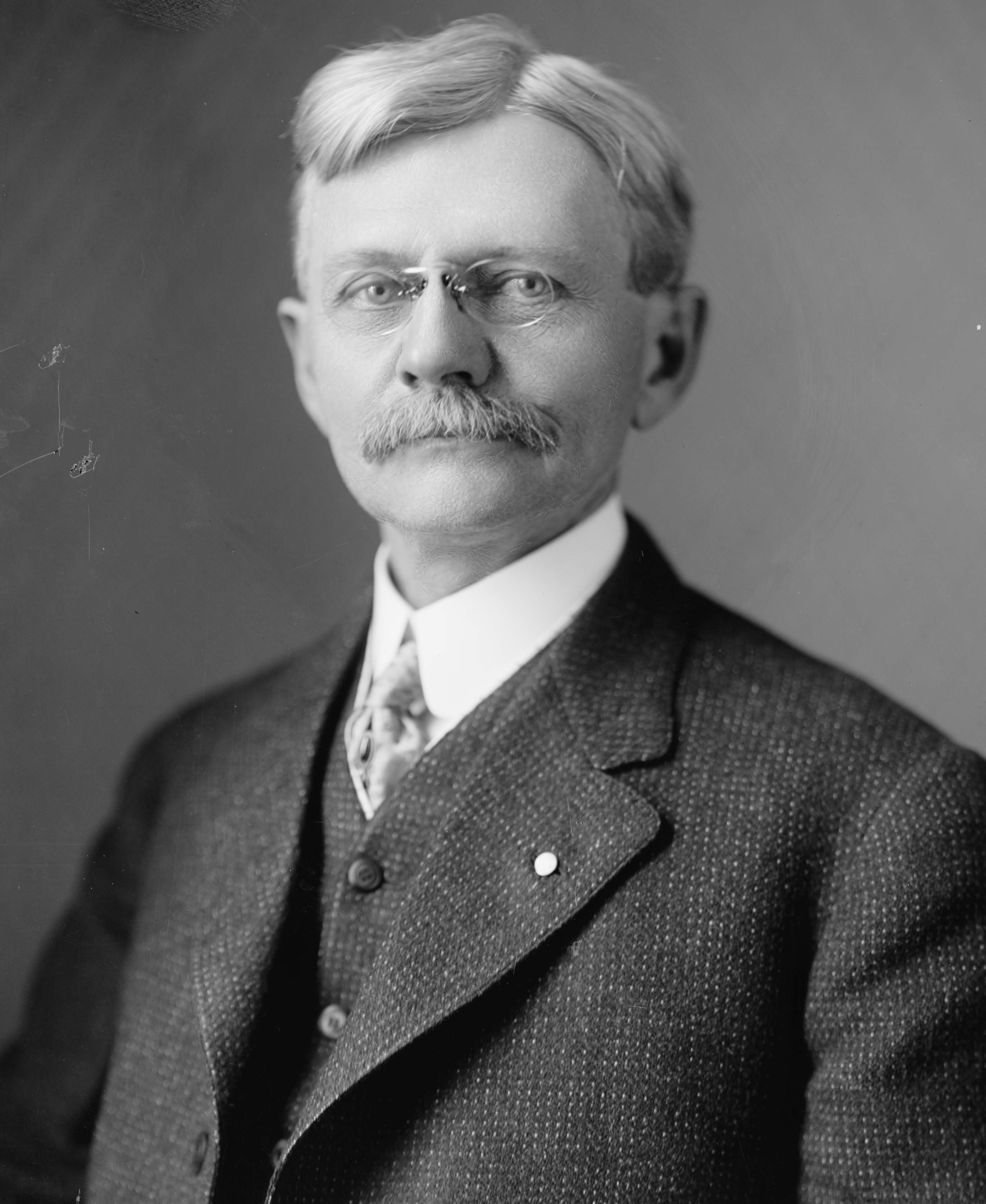
Thomas R. Marshall (D)

Senate president pro tempore

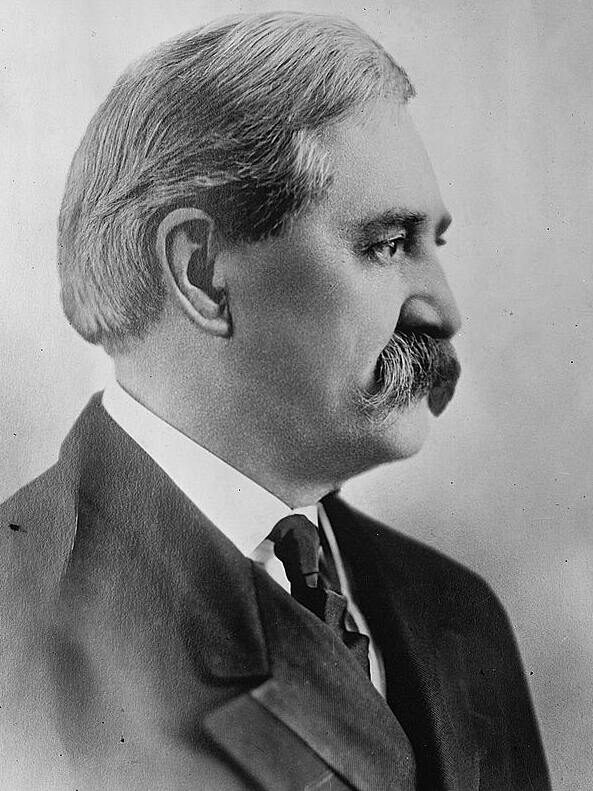
Albert B. Cummins (R)

==== Presiding ====
- President: Thomas R. Marshall (D)
- President pro tempore: Albert B. Cummins (R)

==== Majority (Republican) leadership ====
- Majority Leader: Henry Cabot Lodge
- Majority Whip: Charles Curtis
- Republican Conference Secretary: James Wolcott Wadsworth Jr.
- National Senatorial Committee Chair: Miles Poindexter

==== Minority (Democratic) leadership ====
- Minority Leader: Oscar Underwood
- Minority Whip: Peter G. Gerry
- Democratic Caucus Secretary: William H. King

=== House leadership ===
House Speaker

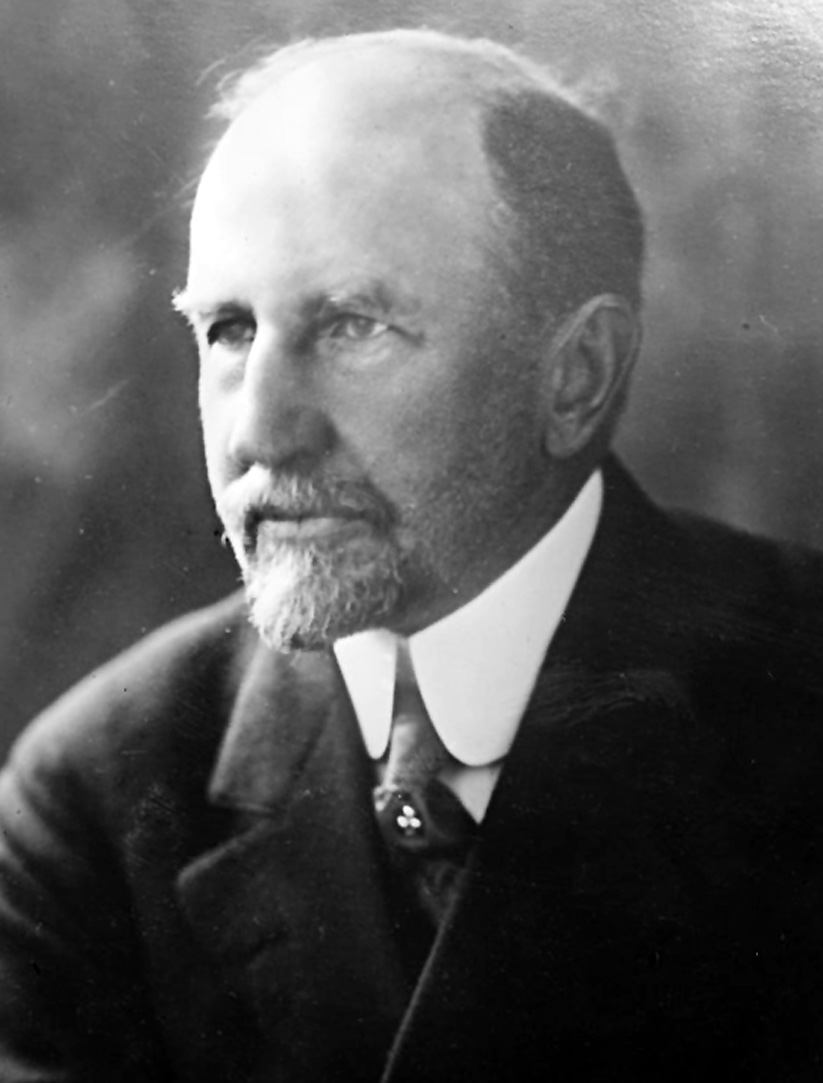
Frederick H. Gillett (R)

==== Presiding ====
- Speaker: Frederick H. Gillett (R)

==== Majority (Republican) leadership ====
- Majority Leader: Franklin Mondell
- Majority Whip: Harold Knutson
- Republican Conference Chairman: Horace Mann Towner
- Republican Campaign Committee Chairman: Simeon D. Fess

==== Minority (Democratic) leadership ====
- Minority Leader: Champ Clark
- Minority Whip: vacant
- Democratic Caucus Chairman: Arthur Granville Dewalt
- Democratic Campaign Committee Chairman: Scott Ferris

== Members ==
Skip to House of Representatives, below

=== Senate ===
In this Congress, Class 3 meant their term ended with this Congress, requiring reelection in 1920; Class 1 meant their term began in the last Congress, requiring reelection in 1922; and Class 2 meant their term began in this Congress, requiring reelection in 1924.

==== Alabama ====
▌2. John H. Bankhead (D), until March 1, 1920

▌B. B. Comer (D), from March 5, 1920 - November 2, 1920
▌J. Thomas Heflin (D), from November 3, 1920

▌3. Oscar Underwood (D)

==== Arizona ====
▌1. Henry F. Ashurst (D)
▌3. Marcus A. Smith (D)

==== Arkansas ====
▌2. Joseph Taylor Robinson (D)
▌3. William F. Kirby (D)

==== California ====
▌1. Hiram W. Johnson (R)
▌3. James D. Phelan (D)

==== Colorado ====
▌2. Lawrence C. Phipps (R)
▌3. Charles S. Thomas (D)

==== Connecticut ====
▌1. George P. McLean (R)
▌3. Frank B. Brandegee (R)

==== Delaware ====
▌1. Josiah O. Wolcott (D)
▌2. L. Heisler Ball (R)

==== Florida ====
▌1. Park Trammell (D)
▌3. Duncan U. Fletcher (D)

==== Georgia ====
▌2. William J. Harris (D)
▌3. Hoke Smith (D)

==== Idaho ====
▌2. William E. Borah (R)
▌3. John F. Nugent (D), until January 14, 1921

▌Frank R. Gooding (R), from January 15, 1921

==== Illinois ====
▌2. J. Medill McCormick (R)
▌3. Lawrence Y. Sherman (R)

==== Indiana ====
▌1. Harry S. New (R)
▌3. James E. Watson (R)

==== Iowa ====
▌2. William S. Kenyon (R)
▌3. Albert B. Cummins (R)

==== Kansas ====
▌2. Arthur Capper (R)
▌3. Charles Curtis (R)

==== Kentucky ====
▌2. Augustus Stanley (D)
▌3. John C. W. Beckham (D)

==== Louisiana ====
▌2. Joseph E. Ransdell (D)
▌3. Edward J. Gay (D)

==== Maine ====
▌1. Frederick Hale (R)
▌2. Bert M. Fernald (R)

==== Maryland ====
▌1. Joseph I. France (R)
▌3. John W. Smith (D)

==== Massachusetts ====
▌1. Henry Cabot Lodge (R)
▌2. David I. Walsh (D)

==== Michigan ====
▌1. Charles E. Townsend (R)
▌2. Truman H. Newberry (R)

==== Minnesota ====
▌1. Frank B. Kellogg (R)
▌2. Knute Nelson (R)

==== Mississippi ====
▌1. John Sharp Williams (D)
▌2. Pat Harrison (D)

==== Missouri ====
▌1. James A. Reed (D)
▌3. Selden P. Spencer (R)

==== Montana ====
▌1. Henry L. Myers (D)
▌2. Thomas J. Walsh (D)

==== Nebraska ====
▌1. Gilbert M. Hitchcock (D)
▌2. George W. Norris (R)

==== Nevada ====
▌1. Key Pittman (D)
▌3. Charles B. Henderson (D)

==== New Hampshire ====
▌2. Henry W. Keyes (R)
▌3. George H. Moses (R)

==== New Jersey ====
▌1. Joseph S. Frelinghuysen (R)
▌2. Walter E. Edge (R)

==== New Mexico ====
▌1. Andrieus A. Jones (D)
▌2. Albert B. Fall (R)

==== New York ====
▌1. William M. Calder (R)
▌3. James W. Wadsworth Jr. (R)

==== North Carolina ====
▌2. Furnifold M. Simmons (D)
▌3. Lee S. Overman (D)

==== North Dakota ====
▌1. Porter J. McCumber (R)
▌3. Asle Gronna (R)

==== Ohio ====
▌1. Atlee Pomerene (D)
▌3. Warren G. Harding (R), until January 13, 1921

▌Frank B. Willis (R), from January 14, 1921

==== Oklahoma ====
▌2. Robert L. Owen (D)
▌3. Thomas P. Gore (D)

==== Oregon ====
▌2. Charles L. McNary (R)
▌3. George E. Chamberlain (D)

==== Pennsylvania ====
▌1. Philander C. Knox (R)
▌3. Boies Penrose (R)

==== Rhode Island ====
▌1. Peter G. Gerry (D)
▌2. LeBaron B. Colt (R)

==== South Carolina ====
▌2. Nathaniel B. Dial (D)
▌3. Ellison D. Smith (D)

==== South Dakota ====
▌2. Thomas Sterling (R)
▌3. Edwin S. Johnson (D)

==== Tennessee ====
▌1. Kenneth D. McKellar (D)
▌2. John K. Shields (D)

==== Texas ====
▌1. Charles A. Culberson (D)
▌2. Morris Sheppard (D)

==== Utah ====
▌1. William H. King (D)
▌3. Reed Smoot (R)

==== Vermont ====
▌1. Carroll S. Page (R)
▌3. William P. Dillingham (R),

==== Virginia ====
▌1. Claude A. Swanson (D)
▌2. Thomas S. Martin (D), until November 12, 1919

▌Carter Glass (D), from February 2, 1920

==== Washington ====
▌1. Miles Poindexter (R)
▌3. Wesley L. Jones (R)

==== West Virginia ====
▌1. Howard Sutherland (R)
▌2. Davis Elkins (R)

==== Wisconsin ====
▌1. Robert M. La Follette (R)
▌3. Irvine Lenroot (R)

==== Wyoming ====
▌1. John B. Kendrick (D)
▌2. Francis E. Warren (R)

Senators' party membership by state at the opening of the 66th Congress in March 1919. 2 Democrats 1 Democrat and 1 Republican 2 Republicans

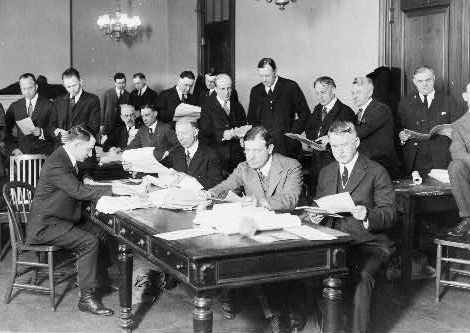
Senate Elections Committee engaged in the counting of the Ford-Newberry vote. Tellers in the foreground of the picture are Senators Walter E. Edge and Selden P. Spencer.

=== House of Representatives ===
The names of representatives are preceded by their district numbers.

==== Alabama ====
▌1. John McDuffie (D)
▌2. S. Hubert Dent Jr. (D)
▌3. Henry B. Steagall (D)
▌4. Fred L. Blackmon (D), until February 8, 1921
▌5. J. Thomas Heflin (D), until November 1, 1920

▌William B. Bowling (D), from December 14, 1920

▌6. William B. Oliver (D)
▌7. John L. Burnett (D), until May 13, 1919

▌Lilius Bratton Rainey (D), from September 30, 1919

▌8. Edward B. Almon (D)
▌9. George Huddleston (D)
▌10. William B. Bankhead (D)

==== Arizona ====
▌At-large. Carl Hayden (D)

==== Arkansas ====
▌1. Thaddeus H. Caraway (D)
▌2. William A. Oldfield (D)
▌3. John N. Tillman (D)
▌4. Otis Wingo (D)
▌5. Henderson M. Jacoway (D)
▌6. Samuel M. Taylor (D)
▌7. William S. Goodwin (D)

==== California ====
▌1. Clarence F. Lea (D)
▌2. John E. Raker (D)
▌3. Charles F. Curry (R)
▌4. Julius Kahn (R)
▌5. John I. Nolan (R)
▌6. John A. Elston (R)
▌7. Henry E. Barbour (R)
▌8. Hugh S. Hersman (D)
▌9. Charles H. Randall (Proh.)
▌10. Henry Z. Osborne (R)
▌11. William Kettner (D)

==== Colorado ====
▌1. William N. Vaile (R)
▌2. Charles Bateman Timberlake (R)
▌3. Guy U. Hardy (R)
▌4. Edward T. Taylor (D)

==== Connecticut ====
▌1. Augustine Lonergan (D)
▌2. Richard P. Freeman (R)
▌3. John Q. Tilson (R)
▌4. Schuyler Merritt (R)
▌5. James P. Glynn (R)

==== Delaware ====
▌At-large. Caleb R. Layton (R)

==== Florida ====
▌1. Herbert J. Drane (D)
▌2. Frank Clark (D)
▌3. John H. Smithwick (D)
▌4. William J. Sears (D)

==== Georgia ====
▌1. James W. Overstreet (D)
▌2. Frank Park (D)
▌3. Charles R. Crisp (D)
▌4. William C. Wright (D)
▌5. William D. Upshaw (D)
▌6. James W. Wise (D)
▌7. Gordon Lee (D)
▌8. Charles H. Brand (D)
▌9. Thomas Montgomery Bell (D)
▌10. Carl Vinson (D)
▌11. William C. Lankford (D)
▌12. William W. Larsen (D)

==== Idaho ====
▌1. Burton L. French (R)
▌2. Addison T. Smith (R)

==== Illinois ====
▌1. Martin B. Madden (R)
▌2. James R. Mann (R)
▌3. William W. Wilson (R)
▌4. John W. Rainey (D)
▌5. Adolph J. Sabath (D)
▌6. James McAndrews (D)
▌7. Niels Juul (R)
▌8. Thomas Gallagher (D)
▌9. Frederick A. Britten (R)
▌10. Carl R. Chindblom (R)
▌11. Ira C. Copley (R)
▌12. Charles Eugene Fuller (R)
▌13. John C. McKenzie (R)
▌14. William J. Graham (R)
▌15. Edward John King (R)
▌16. Clifford Ireland (R)
▌17. Frank L. Smith (R)
▌18. Joseph G. Cannon (R)
▌19. William B. McKinley (R)
▌20. Henry T. Rainey (D)
▌21. Loren E. Wheeler (R)
▌22. William A. Rodenberg (R)
▌23. Edwin B. Brooks (R)
▌24. Thomas S. Williams (R)
▌25. Edward E. Denison (R)
▌At-large. Richard Yates Jr. (R)
▌At-large. William E. Mason (R)

==== Indiana ====
▌1. Oscar R. Luhring (R)
▌2. Oscar E. Bland (R)
▌3. James W. Dunbar (R)
▌4. John S. Benham (R)
▌5. Everett Sanders (R)
▌6. Richard N. Elliott (R)
▌7. Merrill Moores (R)
▌8. Albert H. Vestal (R)
▌9. Fred S. Purnell (R)
▌10. William R. Wood (R)
▌11. Milton Kraus (R)
▌12. Louis W. Fairfield (R)
▌13. Andrew J. Hickey (R)

==== Iowa ====
▌1. Charles A. Kennedy (R)
▌2. Harry E. Hull (R)
▌3. Burton E. Sweet (R)
▌4. Gilbert N. Haugen (R)
▌5. James W. Good (R)
▌6. C. William Ramseyer (R)
▌7. Cassius C. Dowell (R)
▌8. Horace M. Towner (R)
▌9. William R. Green (R)
▌10. Lester J. Dickinson (R)
▌11. William D. Boies (R)

==== Kansas ====
▌1. Daniel Read Anthony Jr. (R)
▌2. Edward C. Little (R)
▌3. Philip P. Campbell (R)
▌4. Homer Hoch (R)
▌5. James G. Strong (R)
▌6. Hays B. White (R)
▌7. Jasper N. Tincher (R)
▌8. William A. Ayres (D)

==== Kentucky ====
▌1. Alben Barkley (D)
▌2. David Hayes Kincheloe (D)
▌3. Robert Y. Thomas Jr. (D)
▌4. Ben Johnson (D)
▌5. Charles F. Ogden (R)
▌6. Arthur B. Rouse (D)
▌7. J. Campbell Cantrill (D)
▌8. King Swope (R), from August 1, 1919
▌9. William Jason Fields (D)
▌10. John W. Langley (R)
▌11. John M. Robsion (R)

==== Louisiana ====
▌1. Albert Estopinal (D), until April 28, 1919

▌James O'Connor (D), from June 5, 1919

▌2. Henry Garland Dupré (D)
▌3. Whitmell P. Martin (D)
▌4. John Thomas Watkins (D)
▌5. Riley Joseph Wilson (D)
▌6. Jared Y. Sanders Sr. (D)
▌7. Ladislas Lazaro (D)
▌8. James Benjamin Aswell (D)

==== Maine ====
▌1. Louis B. Goodall (R)
▌2. Wallace H. White Jr. (R)
▌3. John A. Peters (R)
▌4. Ira G. Hersey (R)

==== Maryland ====
▌1. William N. Andrews (R)
▌2. Carville Benson (D)
▌3. Charles P. Coady (D)
▌4. J. Charles Linthicum (D)
▌5. Sydney Emanuel Mudd II (R)
▌6. Frederick N. Zihlman (R)

==== Massachusetts ====
▌1. Allen T. Treadway (R)
▌2. Frederick H. Gillett (R)
▌3. Calvin D. Paige (R)
▌4. Samuel E. Winslow (R)
▌5. John J. Rogers (R)
▌6. Willfred W. Lufkin (R)
▌7. Michael F. Phelan (D)
▌8. Frederick W. Dallinger (R)
▌9. Alvan T. Fuller (R), until January 5, 1921
▌10. John F. Fitzgerald (D), until October 23, 1919

▌Peter F. Tague (D), from October 23, 1919

▌11. George H. Tinkham (R)
▌12. James A. Gallivan (D)
▌13. Robert Luce (R)
▌14. Richard Olney II (D)
▌15. William S. Greene (R)
▌16. Joseph Walsh (R)

==== Michigan ====
▌1. Frank E. Doremus (D)
▌2. Earl C. Michener (R)
▌3. John M. C. Smith (R)
▌4. Edward L. Hamilton (R)
▌5. Carl Mapes (R)
▌6. Patrick H. Kelley (R)
▌7. Louis C. Cramton (R)
▌8. Joseph W. Fordney (R)
▌9. James C. McLaughlin (R)
▌10. Gilbert A. Currie (R)
▌11. Frank D. Scott (R)
▌12. W. Frank James (R)
▌13. Charles Archibald Nichols (R), until April 25, 1920

▌Clarence J. McLeod (R), from November 2, 1920

==== Minnesota ====
▌1. Sydney Anderson (R)
▌2. Franklin Ellsworth (R)
▌3. Charles Russell Davis (R)
▌4. Carl Van Dyke (D), until May 20, 1919

▌Oscar E. Keller (IR), from July 1, 1919

▌5. Walter H. Newton (R)
▌6. Harold Knutson (R)
▌7. Andrew Volstead (R)
▌8. William Leighton Carss (FL)
▌9. Halvor Steenerson (R)
▌10. Thomas D. Schall (R)

==== Mississippi ====
▌1. Ezekiel S. Candler Jr. (D)
▌2. Hubert D. Stephens (D)
▌3. Benjamin G. Humphreys II (D)
▌4. Thomas U. Sisson (D)
▌5. William Webb Venable (D)
▌6. Paul B. Johnson Sr. (D)
▌7. Percy E. Quin (D)
▌8. James W. Collier (D)

==== Missouri ====
▌1. Milton A. Romjue (D)
▌2. William W. Rucker (D)
▌3. Joshua W. Alexander (D), until December 15, 1919

▌Jacob L. Milligan (D), from February 14, 1920

▌4. Charles F. Booher (D), until January 21, 1921
▌5. William Thomas Bland (D)
▌6. Clement C. Dickinson (D)
▌7. Samuel C. Major (D)
▌8. William L. Nelson (D)
▌9. James Beauchamp Clark (D), until March 2, 1921
▌10. Cleveland A. Newton (R)
▌11. William Leo Igoe (D)
▌12. Leonidas C. Dyer (R)
▌13. Marion E. Rhodes (R)
▌14. Edward D. Hays (R)
▌15. Isaac V. McPherson (R)
▌16. Thomas L. Rubey (D)

==== Montana ====
▌1. John M. Evans (D)
▌2. Carl W. Riddick (R)

==== Nebraska ====
▌1. C. Frank Reavis (R)
▌2. Albert W. Jefferis (R)
▌3. Robert E. Evans (R)
▌4. Melvin O. McLaughlin (R)
▌5. William E. Andrews (R)
▌6. Moses P. Kinkaid (R)

==== Nevada ====
▌At-large. Charles R. Evans (D)

==== New Hampshire ====
▌1. Sherman Everett Burroughs (R)
▌2. Edward Hills Wason (R)

==== New Jersey ====
▌1. William J. Browning (R), until March 24, 1920

▌Francis F. Patterson Jr. (R), from November 2, 1920

▌2. Isaac Bacharach (R)
▌3. Thomas J. Scully (D)
▌4. Elijah C. Hutchinson (R)
▌5. Ernest R. Ackerman (R)
▌6. John R. Ramsey (R)
▌7. Amos H. Radcliffe (R)
▌8. Cornelius A. McGlennon (D)
▌9. Daniel F. Minahan (D)
▌10. Frederick R. Lehlbach (R)
▌11. John J. Eagan (D)
▌12. James A. Hamill (D)

==== New Mexico ====
▌At-large. Benigno C. Hernández (R)

==== New York ====
▌1. Frederick C. Hicks (R)
▌2. C. Pope Caldwell (D)
▌3. John MacCrate (R), until December 30, 1920
▌4. Thomas H. Cullen (D)
▌5. John B. Johnston (D)
▌6. Frederick W. Rowe (R)
▌7. James P. Maher (D)
▌8. William E. Cleary (D)
▌9. David J. O'Connell (D)
▌10. Reuben L. Haskell (R), until December 31, 1919

▌Lester D. Volk (R), from November 2, 1920

▌11. Daniel J. Riordan (D)
▌12. Henry M. Goldfogle (D)
▌13. Christopher D. Sullivan (D)
▌14. Fiorello H. LaGuardia (R), until December 31, 1919

▌Nathan D. Perlman (R), from November 2, 1920

▌15. Peter J. Dooling (D)
▌16. Thomas Francis Smith (D)
▌17. Herbert C. Pell Jr. (D)
▌18. John F. Carew (D)
▌19. Joseph Rowan (D)
▌20. Isaac Siegel (R)
▌21. Jerome F. Donovan (D)
▌22. Anthony J. Griffin (D)
▌23. Richard F. McKiniry (D)
▌24. James V. Ganly (D)
▌25. James W. Husted (R)
▌26. Edmund Platt (R), until June 7, 1920

▌Hamilton Fish III (R), from November 2, 1920

▌27. Charles B. Ward (R)
▌28. Rollin B. Sanford (R)
▌29. James S. Parker (R)
▌30. Frank Crowther (R)
▌31. Bertrand H. Snell (R)
▌32. Luther W. Mott (R)
▌33. Homer P. Snyder (R)
▌34. William H. Hill (R)
▌35. Walter W. Magee (R)
▌36. Norman J. Gould (R)
▌37. Alanson B. Houghton (R)
▌38. Thomas B. Dunn (R)
▌39. Archie D. Sanders (R)
▌40. S. Wallace Dempsey (R)
▌41. Clarence MacGregor (R)
▌42. James M. Mead (D)
▌43. Daniel A. Reed (R)

==== North Carolina ====
▌1. John Humphrey Small (D)
▌2. Claude Kitchin (D)
▌3. Samuel M. Brinson (D)
▌4. Edward W. Pou (D)
▌5. Charles M. Stedman (D)
▌6. Hannibal L. Godwin (D)
▌7. Leonidas D. Robinson (D)
▌8. Robert L. Doughton (D)
▌9. Edwin Y. Webb (D), until November 10, 1919

▌Clyde R. Hoey (D), from December 16, 1919

▌10. Zebulon Weaver (D)

==== North Dakota ====
▌1. John Miller Baer (R)
▌2. George M. Young (R)
▌3. James H. Sinclair (R)

==== Ohio ====
▌1. Nicholas Longworth (R)
▌2. Ambrose E. B. Stephens (R)
▌3. Warren Gard (D)
▌4. Benjamin F. Welty (D)
▌5. Charles J. Thompson (R)
▌6. Charles C. Kearns (R)
▌7. Simeon D. Fess (R)
▌8. R. Clinton Cole (R)
▌9. Isaac R. Sherwood (D)
▌10. Israel M. Foster (R)
▌11. Edwin D. Ricketts (R)
▌12. Clement L. Brumbaugh (D)
▌13. James T. Begg (R)
▌14. Martin L. Davey (D)
▌15. C. Ellis Moore (R)
▌16. Roscoe C. McCulloch (R)
▌17. William A. Ashbrook (D)
▌18. B. Frank Murphy (R)
▌19. John G. Cooper (R)
▌20. Charles A. Mooney (D)
▌21. John J. Babka (D)
▌22. Henry I. Emerson (R)

==== Oklahoma ====
▌1. Everette B. Howard (D)
▌2. William W. Hastings (D)
▌3. Charles D. Carter (D)
▌4. Tom D. McKeown (D)
▌5. Joseph Bryan Thompson (D), until September 18, 1919

▌John W. Harreld (R), from November 8, 1919

▌6. Scott Ferris (D)
▌7. James V. McClintic (D)
▌8. Dick Thompson Morgan (R), until July 4, 1920

▌Charles Swindall (R), from November 2, 1920

==== Oregon ====
▌1. Willis C. Hawley (R)
▌2. Nicholas J. Sinnott (R)
▌3. Clifton N. McArthur (R)

==== Pennsylvania ====
▌1. William S. Vare (R)
▌2. George S. Graham (R)
▌3. J. Hampton Moore (R), until January 4, 1920

▌Harry C. Ransley (R), from November 2, 1920

▌4. George W. Edmonds (R)
▌5. Peter E. Costello (R)
▌6. George P. Darrow (R)
▌7. Thomas S. Butler (R)
▌8. Henry Winfield Watson (R)
▌9. William W. Griest (R)
▌10. Patrick McLane (D), until February 25, 1921

▌John R. Farr (R), from February 25, 1921

▌11. John J. Casey (D)
▌12. John Reber (R)
▌13. Arthur G. Dewalt (D)
▌14. Louis T. McFadden (R)
▌15. Edgar R. Kiess (R)
▌16. John V. Lesher (D)
▌17. Benjamin K. Focht (R)
▌18. Aaron S. Kreider (R)
▌19. John M. Rose (R)
▌20. Edward S. Brooks (R)
▌21. Evan J. Jones (R)
▌22. John Haden Wilson (D)
▌23. Samuel A. Kendall (R)
▌24. Henry W. Temple (R)
▌25. Milton W. Shreve (R)
▌26. Henry J. Steele (D)
▌27. Nathan L. Strong (R)
▌28. Willis J. Hulings (R)
▌29. Stephen G. Porter (R)
▌30. M. Clyde Kelly (R)
▌31. John M. Morin (R)
▌32. Guy E. Campbell (D)
▌At-large. Thomas S. Crago (R)
▌At-large. William J. Burke (R)
▌At-large. Anderson H. Walters (R)
▌At-large. Mahlon M. Garland (R), until November 19, 1920

==== Rhode Island ====
▌1. Clark Burdick (R)
▌2. Walter Russell Stiness (R)
▌3. Ambrose Kennedy (R)

==== South Carolina ====
▌1. Richard S. Whaley (D)
▌2. James F. Byrnes (D)
▌3. Fred H. Dominick (D)
▌4. Samuel J. Nicholls (D)
▌5. William F. Stevenson (D)
▌6. J. Willard Ragsdale (D), until July 23, 1919

▌Philip H. Stoll (D), from October 7, 1919

▌7. Asbury F. Lever (D), until August 1, 1919

▌Edward C. Mann (D), from October 7, 1919

==== South Dakota ====
▌1. Charles A. Christopherson (R)
▌2. Royal C. Johnson (R)
▌3. Harry L. Gandy (D)

==== Tennessee ====
▌1. Sam R. Sells (R)
▌2. J. Will Taylor (R)
▌3. John A. Moon (D)
▌4. Cordell Hull (D)
▌5. Ewin L. Davis (D)
▌6. Joseph W. Byrns (D)
▌7. Lemuel P. Padgett (D)
▌8. Thetus W. Sims (D)
▌9. Finis J. Garrett (D)
▌10. Hubert Fisher (D)

==== Texas ====
▌1. Eugene Black (D)
▌2. John C. Box (D)
▌3. James Young (D)
▌4. Sam Rayburn (D)
▌5. Hatton W. Sumners (D)
▌6. Rufus Hardy (D)
▌7. Clay Stone Briggs (D)
▌8. Joe H. Eagle (D)
▌9. Joseph J. Mansfield (D)
▌10. James P. Buchanan (D)
▌11. Tom T. Connally (D)
▌12. Fritz G. Lanham (D), from April 19, 1919
▌13. Lucian W. Parrish (D)
▌14. Carlos Bee (D)
▌15. John Nance Garner (D)
▌16. Claude B. Hudspeth (D)
▌17. Thomas L. Blanton (D)
▌18. John Marvin Jones (D)

==== Utah ====
▌1. Milton H. Welling (D)
▌2. James Henry Mays (D)

==== Vermont ====
▌1. Frank L. Greene (R)
▌2. Porter H. Dale (R)

==== Virginia ====
▌1. S. Otis Bland (D)
▌2. Edward Everett Holland (D)
▌3. Andrew Jackson Montague (D)
▌4. Walter Allen Watson (D), until December 24, 1919

▌Patrick H. Drewry (D), from April 27, 1920

▌5. Edward W. Saunders (D), until February 29, 1920

▌Rorer A. James (D), from June 1, 1920

▌6. James P. Woods (D)
▌7. Thomas W. Harrison (D)
▌8. R. Walton Moore (D), from April 27, 1919
▌9. C. Bascom Slemp (R)
▌10. Henry D. Flood (D)

==== Washington ====
▌1. John F. Miller (R)
▌2. Lindley H. Hadley (R)
▌3. Albert Johnson (R)
▌4. John W. Summers (R)
▌5. J. Stanley Webster (R)

==== West Virginia ====
▌1. Matthew M. Neely (D)
▌2. George M. Bowers (R)
▌3. Stuart F. Reed (R)
▌4. Harry C. Woodyard (R)
▌5. Wells Goodykoontz (R)
▌6. Leonard S. Echols (R)

==== Wisconsin ====
▌1. Clifford E. Randall (R)
▌2. Edward Voigt (R)
▌3. James G. Monahan (R)
▌4. John C. Kleczka (R)
▌5. Victor L. Berger (Soc.), until November 10, 1919
▌6. Florian Lampert (R)
▌7. John J. Esch (R)
▌8. Edward E. Browne (R)
▌9. David G. Classon (R)
▌10. James A. Frear (R)
▌11. Adolphus P. Nelson (R)

==== Wyoming ====
▌At-large. Franklin W. Mondell (R)

==== Non-voting members ====
▌Alaska Territory. Charles A. Sulzer (D), until April 28, 1919

▌George B. Grigsby (D), from June 3, 1920 - March 1, 1921
▌James Wickersham (R), from March 1, 1921

▌Hawaii Territory. Jonah Kūhiō Kalanianaʻole (R)
▌Puerto Rico. Félix Córdova Dávila (Resident Commissioner), Unionist
▌Philippines. Jaime C. de Veyra (Resident Commissioner), (Nac.)
▌Philippines. Teodoro R. Yangco (Resident Commissioner), (Nac.) until March 3, 1920

▌Isauro Gabaldon (Resident Commissioner), (Nac.) from March 4, 1920

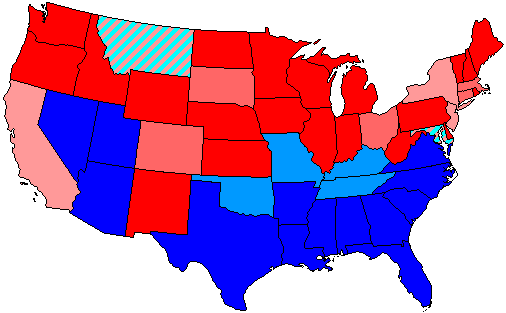
House seats by party holding plurality in state: 80+% to 100% Democratic / 80+% to 100% Republican; 60+% to 80% Democratic / 60+% to 80% Republican; Up to 60% Democratic / Up to 60% Republican

== Changes in membership ==
The count below reflects changes from the beginning of the first session of this Congress.

=== Senate ===
- Replacements: 5
  - Democratic: 1 seat net loss
  - Republican: 1 seat net gain
- Deaths: 2
- Resignations: 2
- Vacancy: 0
- Total seats with changes: 4

State	Senator	Reason for vacancy	Successor	Date of successor's installation
Virginia (2)	Thomas S. Martin (D)	Died November 12, 1919. Successor was appointed and subsequently elected.	Carter Glass (D)	February 2, 1920
Alabama (2)	John H. Bankhead (D)	Died March 1, 1920. Successor was appointed.	B. B. Comer (D)	March 5, 1920
Alabama (2)	B. B. Comer (D)	Successor was elected.	J. Thomas Heflin (D)	November 3, 1920
Ohio (3)	Warren G. Harding (R)	Resigned January 13, 1921, after being elected President of the United States. Successor was appointed having already been elected to the next term.	Frank B. Willis (R)	January 14, 1921
Idaho (3)	John F. Nugent (D)	Resigned January 14, 1921, after losing election and subsequently being appointed to the Federal Trade Commission. Successor was appointed having already been elected to the next term..	Frank R. Gooding (R)	January 15, 1921

=== House of Representatives ===
- Replacements: 23
  - Democratic: 4 seat net loss
  - Republican: 4 seat net gain
- Deaths: 13
- Resignations: 10
- Contested elections: 3
- Total seats with changes: 32

District	Vacated by	Reason for vacancy	Successor	Date of successor's installation
Texas 12th	Vacant	Rep. James C. Wilson died during previous congress	Fritz G. Lanham (D)	April 19, 1919
Virginia 8th	Vacant	Rep. Charles C. Carlin resigned during previous congress	R. Walton Moore (D)	April 19, 1919
Kentucky 8th	Vacant	Rep. Harvey Helm died during previous congress	King Swope (R)	August 1, 1919
Louisiana 1st	Albert Estopinal (D)	Died April 28, 1919	James O'Connor (D)	June 5, 1919
Alaska Territory	Charles A. Sulzer (D)	Died April 28, 1919	George B. Grigsby (D)	June 30, 1920
Alabama 7th	John L. Burnett (D)	Died May 13, 1919	Lilius Bratton Rainey (D)	September 30, 1919
Minnesota 4th	Carl Van Dyke (D)	Died May 20, 1919	Oscar Keller (R)	July 1, 1919
South Carolina 6th	J. Willard Ragsdale (D)	Died July 23, 1919	Philip H. Stoll (D)	October 7, 1919
South Carolina 7th	Asbury F. Lever (D)	Resigned August 1, 1919, after becoming member of the Federal Farm Loan Board	Edward C. Mann (D)	October 7, 1919
Oklahoma 5th	Joseph B. Thompson (D)	Died September 18, 1919	John W. Harreld (R)	November 8, 1919
Massachusetts 10th	John F. Fitzgerald (D)	Lost contested election October 23, 1919	Peter F. Tague (D)	October 23, 1919
North Carolina 9th	Edwin Y. Webb (D)	Resigned November 10, 1919, after being appointed to the United States District Court for the Western District of North Carolina	Clyde R. Hoey (D)	December 16, 1919
Wisconsin 5th	Victor L. Berger (Socialist)	Ousted November 10, 1919, due to his conviction under the Espionage Act of 1917	Seat remained vacant until next Congress	
Missouri 3rd	Joshua W. Alexander (D)	Resigned December 15, 1919, after being appointed United States Secretary of Commerce	Jacob L. Milligan (D)	February 14, 1920
Virginia 4th	Walter A. Watson (D)	Died December 24, 1919	Patrick H. Drewry (D)	April 27, 1920
New York 10th	Reuben L. Haskell (R)	Resigned December 31, 1919	Lester D. Volk (R)	November 2, 1920
New York 14th	Fiorello H. La Guardia (R)	Resigned December 31, 1919, after being elected President of the New York City Board of Aldermen	Nathan D. Perlman (R)	November 2, 1920
Pennsylvania 3rd	J. Hampton Moore (R)	Resigned January 4, 1920, after being elected Mayor of Philadelphia	Harry C. Ransley (R)	November 2, 1920
Virginia 5th	Edward W. Saunders (D)	Resigned February 29, 1920, after being elected judge of the State Supreme Court of Appeals	Rorer A. James (D)	June 1, 1920
Philippines At-large	Teodoro R. Yangco	Term expired March 3, 1920	Isauro Gabaldon	March 4, 1920
New Jersey 1st	William J. Browning (R)	Died March 24, 1920	Francis F. Patterson Jr. (R)	November 2, 1920
Michigan 13th	Charles A. Nichols (R)	Died April 25, 1920	Clarence J. McLeod (R)	November 2, 1920
New York 26th	Edmund Platt (R)	Resigned June 7, 1920, after being appointed to the Federal Reserve Board	Hamilton Fish III (R)	November 2, 1920
Oklahoma 8th	Dick T. Morgan (R)	Died July 4, 1920	Charles Swindall (R)	November 2, 1920
Alabama 5th	J. Thomas Heflin (D)	Resigned November 1, 1920, after being elected to the U.S. Senate	William B. Bowling (D)	December 14, 1920
Pennsylvania At-large	Mahlon M. Garland (R)	Died November 19, 1920	Seat remained vacant until next Congress	
New York 3rd	John MacCrate (R)	Resigned December 30, 1920, after being elected justice of the Supreme Court of the State of New York	Seat remained vacant until next Congress	
Massachusetts 9th	Alvan T. Fuller (R)	Resigned January 5, 1921, after being elected Lieutenant Governor of Massachusetts	Seat remained vacant until next Congress	
Missouri 4th	Charles F. Booher (D)	Died January 21, 1921	Seat remained vacant until next Congress	
Alabama 4th	Fred L. Blackmon (D)	Died February 8, 1921	Seat remained vacant until next Congress	
Pennsylvania 10th	Patrick McLane (D)	Lost contested election February 25, 1921	John R. Farr (R)	February 25, 1921
Alaska Territory	George B. Grigsby (D)	Lost contested election March 1, 1921	James Wickersham (R)	March 1, 1921
Missouri 9th	Champ Clark (D)	Died March 2, 1921 having already been defeated for re-election	Seat remained vacant until next Congress	

== Committees ==
Lists of committees and their party leaders for members of the House and Senate committees can be found through the Official Congressional Directory at the bottom of this article. The directory after the pages of terms of service lists committees of the Senate, House (Standing with Subcommittees, Select and Special) and Joint and, after that, House/Senate committee assignments. On the committees section of the House and Senate in the Official Congressional Directory, the committee's members on the first row on the left side shows the chairman of the committee and on the right side shows the ranking member of the committee.

=== Senate ===
- Additional Accommodations for the Library of Congress (Select) (Chairman: Furnifold M. Simmons; Ranking Member: Boies Penrose)
- Agriculture and Forestry (Chairman: Asle Gronna; Ranking Member: Thomas P. Gore)
- Appropriations (Chairman: Francis E. Warren; Ranking Member: Lee S. Overman)
- Audit and Control the Contingent Expenses of the Senate (Chairman: William M. Calder; Ranking Member: Andrieus A. Jones)
- Banking and Currency (Chairman: George P. McLean; Ranking Member: Robert L. Owen)
- Budget (Special)
- Canadian Relations (Chairman: Frederick Hale; Ranking Member: John B. Kendrick)
- Census (Chairman: Howard Sutherland; Ranking Member: Morris Sheppard)
- Civil Service and Retrenchment (Chairman: Thomas Sterling; Ranking Member: Kenneth McKellar)
- Claims (Chairman: Selden P. Spencer; Ranking Member: Joseph T. Robinson)
- Coast and Insular Survey (Chairman: Walter Evans Edge; Ranking Member: Edward J. Gay)
- Coast Defenses (Chairman: Joseph S. Frelinghuysen; Ranking Member: John W. Smith)
- Commerce (Chairman: Wesley L. Jones; Ranking Member: Duncan U. Fletcher)
- Conservation of National Resources (Chairman: Ellison D. Smith; Ranking Member: LeBaron B. Colt)
- Corporations Organized in the District of Columbia (Chairman: Atlee Pomerene; Ranking Member: Robert M. La Follette)
- Cuban Relations (Chairman: Hiram W. Johnson; Ranking Member: Oscar W. Underwood)
- Disposition of Useless Papers in the Executive Departments (Chairman: Thomas J. Walsh; Ranking Member: Joseph I. France)
- District of Columbia (Chairman: Lawrence Y. Sherman; Ranking Member: John W. Smith)
- District of Columbia Public School System (Select)
- Education and Labor (Chairman: William S. Kenyon; Ranking Member: Hoke Smith)
- Engrossed Bills (Chairman: Lee S. Overman; Ranking Member: Francis E. Warren)
- Enrolled Bills (Chairman: L. Heisler Ball; Ranking Member: Nathaniel B. Dial)
- Establish a University in the United States (Select)
- Examine the Several Branches in the Civil Service (Chairman: John Walter Smith; Ranking Member: Frank B. Brandegee)
- Expenditures in the Department of Agriculture (Chairman: Arthur Capper; Ranking Member: Furnifold M. Simmons)
- Expenditures in the Department of Commerce (Chairman: Davis Elkins; Ranking Member: Josiah O. Wolcott)
- Expenditures in the Interior Department (Chairman: John H. Bankhead; Ranking Member: Reed Smoot)
- Expenditures in the Department of Justice (Chairman: Thomas P. Gore; Ranking Member: William E. Borah)
- Expenditures in the Department of Labor (Chairman: Medill McCormick; Ranking Member: J.C.W. Beckham)
- Expenditures in the Navy Department (Chairman: Claude A. Swanson; Ranking Member: William P. Dillingham)
- Expenditures in the Post Office Department (Chairman: Henry W. Keyes; Ranking Member: William H. King)
- Expenditures in the Department of State (Chairman: Lawrence C. Phipps; Ranking Member: Henry L. Myers)
- Expenditures in the Treasury Department (Chairman: Hoke Smith; Ranking Member: Warren G. Harding)
- Finance (Chairman: Boies Penrose; Ranking Member: Furnifold M. Simmons)
- Fisheries (Chairman: Truman H. Newberry; Ranking Member: Duncan U. Fletcher)
- Five Civilized Tribes of Indians (Chairman: Robert L. Owen; Ranking Member: George W. Norris)
- Foreign Relations (Chairman: Henry Cabot Lodge; Ranking Member: Gilbert M. Hitchcock)
- Forest Reservations and the Protection of Game (Chairman: Gilbert M. Hitchcock; Ranking Member: George P. McLean)
- Geological Survey (Chairman: Marcus A. Smith; Ranking Member: George W. Norris)
- Immigration (Chairman: LeBaron B. Colt; Ranking Member: Thomas P. Gore)
- Indian Affairs (Chairman: Charles Curtis; Ranking Member: Henry F. Ashurst)
- Indian Depredations (Chairman: Henry L. Myers; Ranking Member: Miles Poindexter)
- Industrial Expositions (Chairman: Key Pittman; Ranking Member: Asle Gronna)
- Interoceanic Canals (Chairman: William E. Borah; Ranking Member: Thomas J. Walsh)
- Interstate Commerce (Chairman: Albert B. Cummins; Ranking Member: Ellison D. Smith)
- Investigate Trespassers upon Indian Lands (Chairman: Henry F. Ashurst; Ranking Member: Wesley L. Jones)
- Irrigation and Reclamation of Arid Lands (Chairman: Charles L. McNary; Ranking Member: James D. Phelan)
- Judiciary (Chairman: Knute Nelson; Ranking Member: Charles A. Culberson)
- Library (Chairman: Frank B. Brandegee; Ranking Member: John S. Williams)
- Manufactures (Chairman: Robert M. La Follette; Ranking Member: Ellison D. Smith)
- Military Affairs (Chairman: James W. Wadsworth Jr.; Ranking Member: George E. Chamberlain)
- Mines and Mining (Chairman: Miles Poindexter; Ranking Member: Charles B. Henderson)
- Mississippi River and its Tributaries (Select) (Chairman: Joseph E. Ransdell; Ranking Member: Albert B. Cummins)
- National Banks (Chairman: Frank B. Kellogg; Ranking Member: Peter G. Gerry)
- Naval Affairs (Chairman: Carroll S. Page; Ranking Member: Claude A. Swanson)
- Pacific Islands, Puerto Rico and the Virgin Islands (Chairman: Albert B. Fall; Ranking Member: Morris Sheppard)
- Pacific Railroads (Chairman: Charles S. Thomas; Ranking Member: Frank B. Brandegee)
- Patents (Chairman: George W. Norris; Ranking Member: William F. Kirby)
- Pensions (Chairman: Porter J. McCumber; Ranking Member: Thomas J. Walsh)
- Philippines (Chairman: Warren G. Harding; Ranking Member: Duncan U. Fletcher)
- Post Office and Post Roads (Chairman: Charles E. Townsend; Ranking Member: John H. Bankhead)
- Printing (Chairman: George H. Moses; Ranking Member: Marcus A. Smith)
- Private Land Claims (Chairman: Charles A. Culberson; Ranking Member: Knute Nelson)
- Privileges and Elections (Chairman: William P. Dillingham; Ranking Member: Atlee Pomerene)
- Public Buildings and Grounds (Chairman: Bert M. Fernald; Ranking Member: James A. Reed)
- Public Health and National Quarantine (Chairman: Joseph I. France; Ranking Member: Joseph E. Ransdell)
- Public Lands (Chairman: Reed Smoot; Ranking Member: Henry L. Myers)
- Railroads (Chairman: Irvine L. Lenroot; Ranking Member: Peter G. Gerry)
- Reconstruction and Production (Select)
- Revision of the Laws (Chairman: N/A; Ranking Member: N/A)
- Revolutionary Claims (Chairman: Morris Sheppard; Ranking Member: Henry Cabot Lodge)
- Rules (Chairman: Philander C. Knox; Ranking Member: Lee S. Overman)
- Standards, Weights and Measures (Chairman: William S. Kenyon; Ranking Member: Warren G. Harding)
- Tariff Regulation (Select)
- Territories (Chairman: Harry S. New; Ranking Member: Key Pittman)
- Transportation and Sale of Meat Products (Select) (Chairman: Duncan U. Fletcher; Ranking Member: Porter J. McCumber)
- Transportation Routes to the Seaboard (Chairman: Duncan U. Fletcher; Ranking Member: William P. Dillingham)
- Trespassers upon Indian Lands (Select) (Chairman: Henry F. Ashurst; Ranking Member: Wesley L. Jones)
- Whole
- Woman Suffrage (Chairman: James Eli Watson; Ranking Member: Andrieus A. Jones)

=== House of Representatives ===
- Accounts (Chairman: Clifford Ireland; Ranking Member: Frank Park)
- Agriculture (Chairman: Gilbert N. Haugen; Ranking Member: Gordon Lee)
- Alcoholic Liquor Traffic (Chairman: Addison T. Smith; Ranking Member: William D. Upshaw)
- Appropriations (Chairman: James W. Good; Ranking Member: Joseph W. Byrns)
- Banking and Currency (Chairman: Edmund Platt; Ranking Member: Michael F. Phelan)
- Budget (Select) (Chairman: James W. Good; Ranking Member: Joseph W. Byrns)
- Census (Chairman: Charles A. Nichols; Ranking Member: James B. Aswell)
- Claims (Chairman: George W. Edmonds; Ranking Member: Henry B. Steagall)
- Coinage, Weights and Measures (Chairman: Albert H. Vestal; Ranking Member: William A. Ashbrook)
- Disposition of Executive Papers (Chairman: Merrill Moores)
- District of Columbia (Chairman: Carl E. Mapes; Ranking Member: Ben Johnson)
- Education (Chairman: Simeon D. Fess; Ranking Member: William J. Sears)
- Election of the President, Vice President and Representatives in Congress (Chairman: Florian Lampert; Ranking Member: William W. Rucker)
- Elections No.#1 (Chairman: Frederick W. Dallinger; Ranking Member: Joe H. Eagle)
- Elections No.#2 (Chairman: Louis B. Goodall; Ranking Member: James W. Overstreet)
- Elections No.#3 (Chairman: Cassius C. Dowell; Ranking Member: Joseph Rowan)
- Enrolled Bills (Chairman: John R. Ramsey; Ranking Member: Ladislas Lazaro)
- Expenditures in the Agriculture Department (Chairman: John M. Baer; Ranking Member: Robert L. Doughton)
- Expenditures in the Commerce Department (Chairman: Thomas Sutler Williams; Ranking Member: Michael F. Phelan)
- Expenditures in the Interior Department (Chairman: Aaron S. Kreider; Ranking Member: William F. Stevenson)
- Expenditures in the Justice Department (Chairman: Wallace H. White Jr.; Ranking Member: James P. Buchanan)
- Expenditures in the Labor Department (Chairman: Anderson H. Walters; Ranking Member: John J. Casey)
- Expenditures in the Navy Department (Chairman: Leonard S. Echols; Ranking Member: Rufus Hardy)
- Expenditures in the Post Office Department (Chairman: Frederick N. Zihlman; Ranking Member: Benjamin G. Humphreys)
- Expenditures in the State Department (Chairman: Richard N. Elliott; Ranking Member: Clement Brumbaugh)
- Expenditures in the Treasury Department (Chairman: Porter H. Dale; Ranking Member: Charles D. Carter)
- Expenditures in the War Department (Chairman: William J. Graham; Ranking Member: Jerome F. Donovan)
- Expenditures on Public Buildings (Chairman: Ira G. Hersey; Ranking Member: Ezekiel S. Candler Jr.)
- Flood Control (Chairman: William A. Rodenberg; Ranking Member: Benjamin G. Humphreys)
- Foreign Affairs (Chairman: Stephen G. Porter; Ranking Member: Henry D. Flood)
- Immigration and Naturalization (Chairman: Albert Johnson; Ranking Member: Adolph J. Sabath)
- Indian Affairs (Chairman: Philip P. Campbell; Ranking Member: Charles D. Carter)
- Industrial Arts and Expositions (Chairman: Oscar E. Bland; Ranking Member: Isaac R. Sherwood)
- Insular Affairs (Chairman: Horace M. Towner; Ranking Member: Finis J. Garrett)
- Interstate and Foreign Commerce (Chairman: John J. Esch; Ranking Member: Thetus W. Sims)
- Invalid Pensions (Chairman: Charles E. Fuller; Ranking Member: Isaac R. Sherwood)
- Investigate Contracts and Expenditures Made by the War Department during the War (Select) (Chairman: N/A; Ranking Member: N/A)
- Irrigation of Arid Lands (Chairman: Moses P. Kinkaid; Ranking Member: Edward T. Taylor)
- Judiciary (Chairman: Andrew J. Volstead; Ranking Member: Robert Y. Thomas Jr.)
- Labor (Chairman: John M. C. Smith; Ranking Member: James P. Maher)
- Library (Chairman: Norman J. Gould; Ranking Member: Ben Johnson)
- Merchant Marine and Fisheries (Chairman: William S. Greene; Ranking Member: Rufus Hardy)
- Mileage (Chairman: John A. Elston; Ranking Member: James P. Maher)
- Military Affairs (Chairman: Julius Kahn; Ranking Member: S. Hubert Dent Jr.)
- Mines and Mining (Chairman: Mahlon M. Garland; Ranking Member: Otis Wingo)
- Naval Affairs (Chairman: Thomas S. Butler; Ranking Member: Lemuel P. Padgett)
- Patents (Chairman: John I. Nolan; Ranking Member: Guy E. Campbell)
- Pensions (Chairman: Sam R. Sells; Ranking Member: James M. Mead)
- Post Office and Post Roads (Chairman: Halvor Steenerson; Ranking Member: John A. Moon)
- Printing (Chairman: Edgar R. Kiess; Ranking Member: James V. McClintic)
- Public Buildings and Grounds (Chairman: John W. Langley; Ranking Member: Frank Clark)
- Public Lands (Chairman: Nicholas J. Sinnott; Ranking Member: Scott Ferris)
- Railways and Canals (Chairman: Loren E. Wheeler; Ranking Member: Benjamin F. Welty)
- Reform in the Civil Service (Chairman: Frederick R. Lehlbach; Ranking Member: Hannibal L. Godwin)
- Revision of Laws (Chairman: Edward C. Little; Ranking Member: John T. Watkins)
- Rivers and Harbors (Chairman: Charles A. Kennedy; Ranking Member: John H. Small)
- Roads (Chairman: Thomas B. Dunn; Ranking Member: Edward W. Saunders)
- Rules (Chairman: Philip P. Campbell; Ranking Member: Edward W. Pou)
- Standards of Official Conduct
- Territories (Chairman: Charles F. Curry; Ranking Member: John T. Watkins)
- United States Shipping Board Operations (Select) (Chairman: Joseph Walsh; Ranking Member: N/A)
- War Claims (Chairman: Benjamin K. Focht; Ranking Member: Frank Clark)
- Water Power (Special) (Chairman: John J. Esch; Ranking Member: Thetus W. Sims)
- Ways and Means (Chairman: Joseph W. Fordney; Ranking Member: Claude Kitchin)
- Woman Suffrage (Chairman: James Robert Mann; Ranking Member: John E. Raker)
- Whole

=== Joint committees ===
- Conditions of Indian Tribes (Special)
- Disposition of (Useless) Executive Papers
- High Cost of Living
- The Library (Chairman: Sen. Frank B. Brandegee)
- Pacific Coast Naval Bases
- Postal Salaries
- Postal Service
- Printing (Chairman: Sen. Reed Smoot)
- Reclassification of Salaries
- Reorganization
- Reorganization of the Administrative Branch of the Government
- Three Hundredth Anniversary of the Landing of the Pilgrims
- To Investigate the System of Shortime Rural Credits

== Caucuses ==
- Democratic (House)
- Democratic (Senate)

== Employees ==
=== Legislative branch agency directors ===
- Architect of the Capitol: Elliott Woods
- Librarian of Congress: Herbert Putnam
- Public Printer of the United States: Cornelius Ford

=== Senate ===
- Chaplain: F.J. Prettyman (Methodist), until January 21, 1921.
  - John J. Muir (Baptist), from January 21, 1921.
- Secretary: James M. Baker, until May 19, 1919.
  - George A. Sanderson, from May 19, 1919.
- Librarian: Edward C. Goodwin
- Sergeant at Arms: Charles P. Higgins, until May 19, 1919.
  - David S. Barry, from May 19, 1919.

=== House of Representatives ===
- Chaplain: Henry N. Couden (Universalist)
- Clerk: South Trimble, until May 19, 1919
  - William T. Page, from May 19, 1919
- Doorkeeper: Bert W. Kennedy
- Clerk at the Speaker's Table: Clarence A. Cannon
  - Lehr Fess
- Reading Clerks: Patrick Joseph Haltigan (D) and Alney E. Chaffee (R)
- Postmaster: Frank W. Collier
- Sergeant at Arms: Robert B. Gordon, until May 19, 1919
  - Joseph G. Rodgers, from May 19, 1919

== See also ==
- 1918 United States elections (elections leading to this Congress)
  - 1918 United States Senate elections
  - 1918 United States House of Representatives elections
- 1920 United States elections (elections during this Congress, leading to the next Congress)
  - 1920 United States presidential election
  - 1920 United States Senate elections
  - 1920 United States House of Representatives elections
