= Anderson H. Walters =

American politician

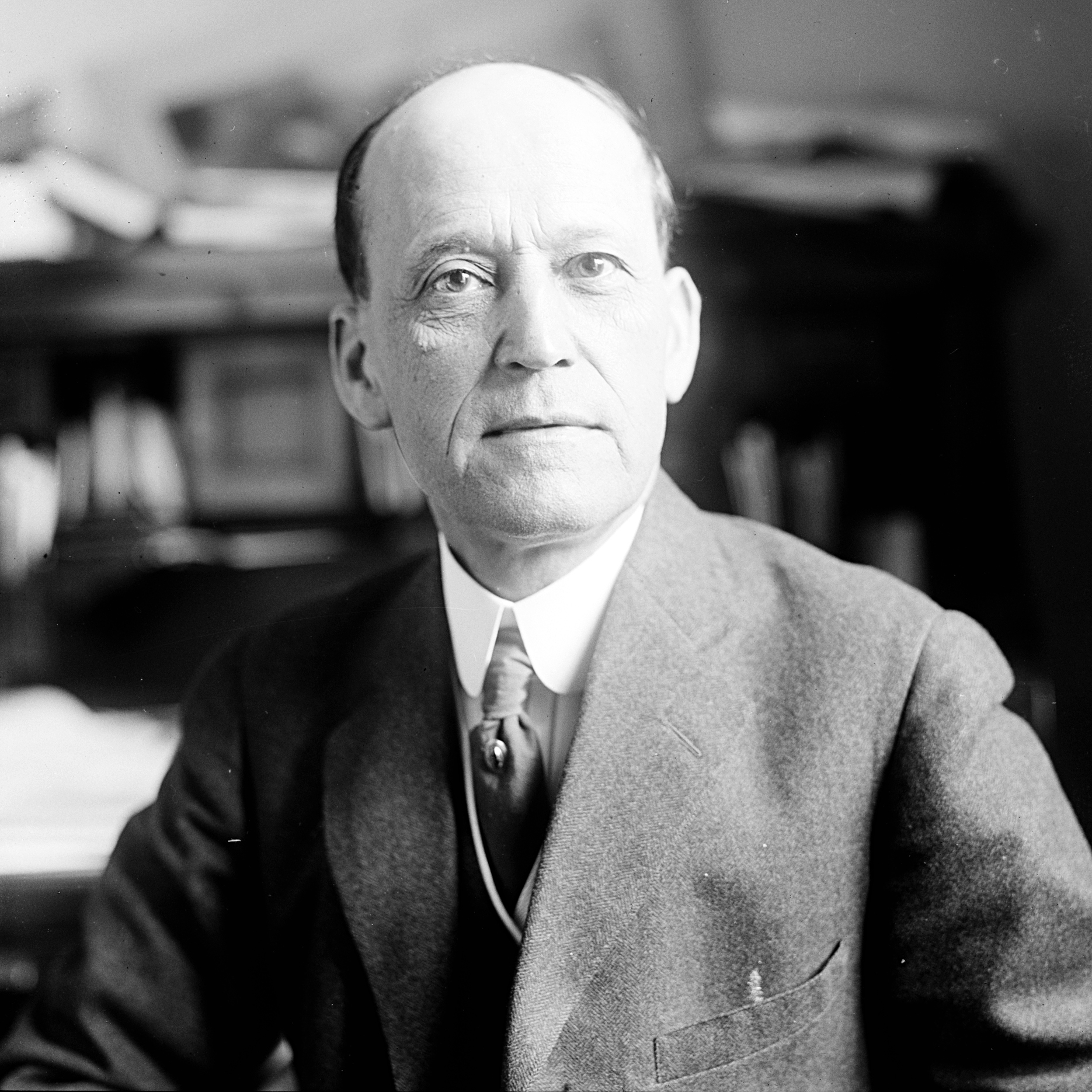
Anderson Howell Walters

Anderson Howell Walters (May 18, 1862 – December 7, 1927) was a Republican member of the U.S. House of Representatives from Pennsylvania.

== Johnstown activities ==
Anderson H. Walters was born in Johnstown, Pennsylvania. He attended the public schools and was graduated from Johnstown High School in 1878. He was employed as a telegrapher and clerk with the Pennsylvania Railroad Company from 1878 to 1880. He entered the service of the Johnstown Water Company and the Johnstown Gas Company in 1881 and was assistant superintendent of these companies in 1889 and general manager and secretary from 1895 to 1902. He was a delegate to the Republican State conventions in 1890, 1892, 1898, and 1904, and a delegate to the 1896 Republican National Convention. He was the chairman of the Republican city committee from 1896 to 1899, and a member of the Republican State committee from 1898 to 1902. He was a member of the Johnstown City Council from 1900 to 1904. He was editor and proprietor of the Johnstown Tribune from 1902 until his death. He was elected as a member of the board of trustees of the Johnstown Savings Bank in 1907. In May 1917, he and a group of businessmen chartered the Rotary Club of Johnstown and Anderson Walters became its first president.

== United States House of Representatives ==
Walters was elected as a Republican to the Sixty-third Congress, and he was not a candidate for renomination. He was again elected to the Sixty-sixth and Sixty-seventh Congresses. He was the Chairman of the United States House Committee on Expenditures in the Department of Labor during the Sixty-sixth and Sixty-seventh Congresses. He was not a candidate for renomination. He was again elected to the Sixty-ninth Congress, and was not a candidate for renomination.

He died in Johnstown. Interment in Grandview Cemetery, Johnstown.

== Sources ==
- United States Congress. "Anderson H. Walters (id: W000109)". Biographical Directory of the United States Congress.
- The Political Graveyard

U.S. House of Representatives
| Preceded by Seat created | Member of the U.S. House of Representatives from Pennsylvania's at-large congressional district March 4, 1913 – March 3, 1915 alongside: Fred E. Lewis, John M. Morin, Arthur Ringwalt Rupley | Succeeded by At-large: Thomas S. Crago, John R. K. Scott, Daniel F. Lafean, Mahlon M. Garland |
| Preceded by At-large: Thomas S. Crago, John R. K. Scott, Daniel F. Lafean, Mahlon M. Garland | Member of the U.S. House of Representatives from Pennsylvania's at-large congressional district March 4, 1919 – March 3, 1921 alongside: Thomas S. Crago, William J. Burke, Mahlon M. Garland; March 4, 1921 – March 4, 1923 alongside: Thomas S. Crago, William J. Burke, Joseph McLaughlin | Succeeded by At-large seat eliminated in favor of districts |
| Preceded by George M. Wertz | Member of the U.S. House of Representatives from Pennsylvania's 20th congressional district 1925–1927 | Succeeded by J. Russell Leech |
