= Harry A. Estep =

American politician

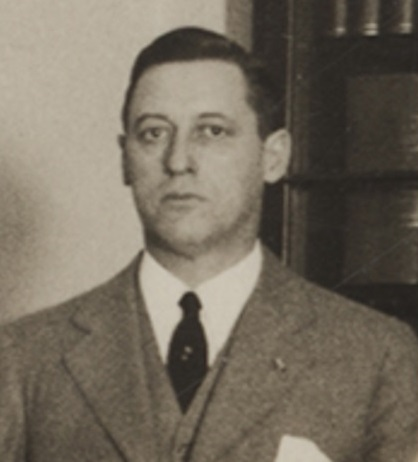

Member of the U.S. House of Representatives from Pennsylvania's 35th district
- In office March 4, 1927 – March 3, 1933
- Preceded by: James McDevitt Magee
- Succeeded by: District eliminated

Personal details
- Born: February 1, 1884 Pittsburgh, Pennsylvania, U.S.
- Died: February 28, 1968 (aged 84) Oakland, Pennsylvania, U.S.
- Party: Republican
- Education: Purdue University; University of Pittsburgh School of Law

Harry Allison Estep (February 1, 1884 – February 28, 1968) was an American politician and Republican member of the U.S. House of Representatives from Pennsylvania.

== Biography ==
Harry A. Estep was born in Pittsburgh, Pennsylvania. He attended the public schools in Marion, Indiana, and Purdue University in Lafayette, Indiana. He graduated from the University of Pittsburgh School of Law in 1913. He was admitted to the bar in 1914 and commenced practice in Pittsburgh. He served as assistant district attorney of Allegheny County, Pennsylvania, from 1917 to 1927.

Estep was elected as a Republican to the Seventieth, Seventy-first, and Seventy-second Congresses. He was an unsuccessful candidate for reelection in 1932. He resumed the practice of law until his retirement in 1964. He died in Oakland, Pennsylvania, and is buried in Allegheny Cemetery.

== Sources ==
- United States Congress. "Harry A. Estep (id: E000221)". Biographical Directory of the United States Congress.
- The Political Graveyard

U.S. House of Representatives
Preceded by James M. Magee	Member of the U.S. House of Representatives from Pennsylvania's 35th congressional district 1927–1933	Succeeded by District Eliminated
