= Wooda N. Carr =

American politician (1871–1953)

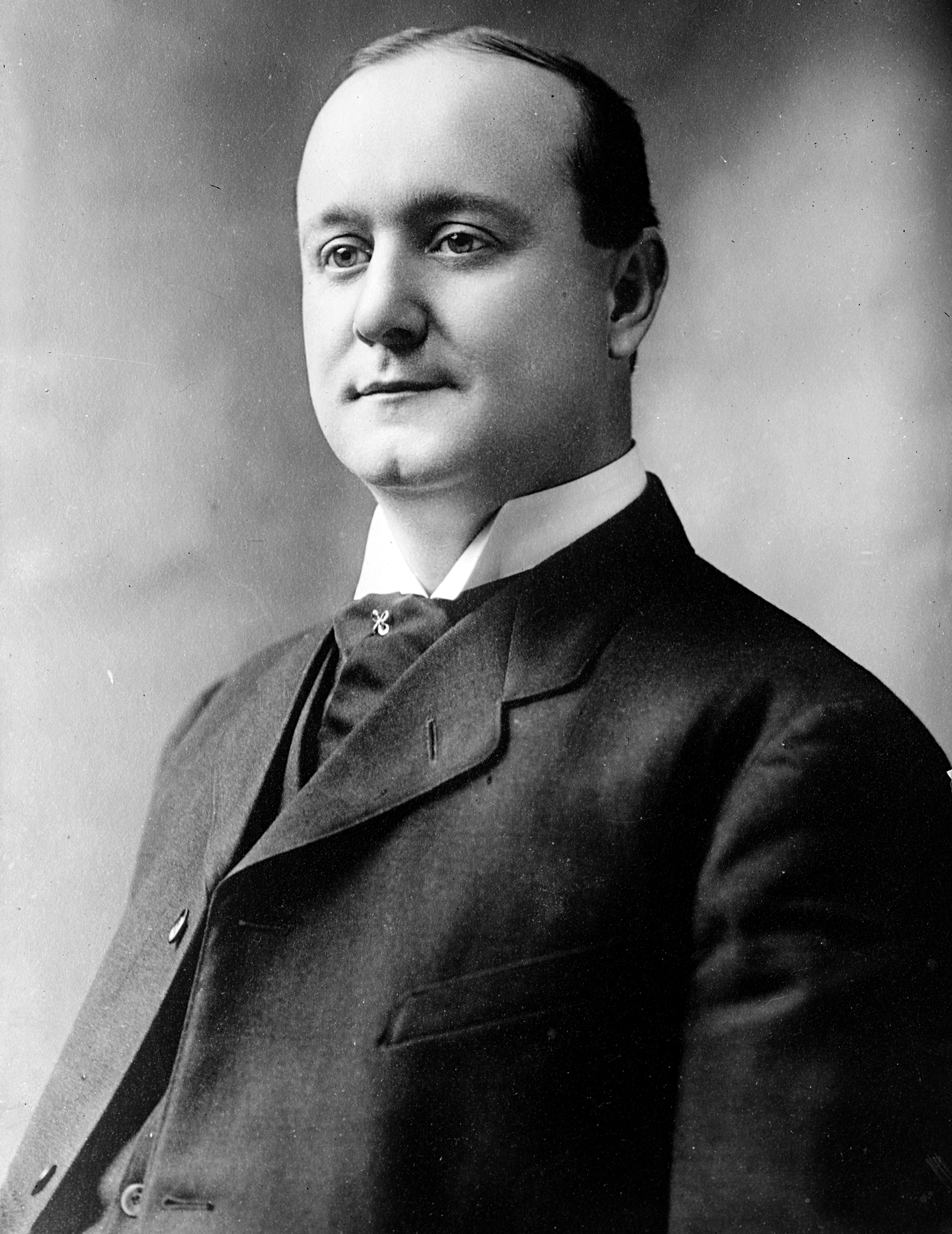

Member of the U.S. House of Representatives from Pennsylvania's 23rd district
- In office March 4, 1913 – March 4, 1915
- Preceded by: Thomas S. Crago
- Succeeded by: Robert F. Hopwood

Personal details
- Born: February 6, 1871 Allegheny City, Pennsylvania, U.S.
- Died: June 28, 1953 (aged 82)
- Party: Democratic

Wooda Nicholas Carr (February 6, 1871 – June 28, 1953) was a Democratic member of the U.S. House of Representatives from Pennsylvania. His son was the mystery novelist John Dickson Carr.

Wooda N. Carr was born in Allegheny City, Pennsylvania (now a part of Pittsburgh, Pennsylvania). He attended the public schools and Madison College. He graduated from Monongahela College in Pennsylvania, in 1891. He was editor of the Uniontown News and the Uniontown Democrat in 1892. He studied law, was admitted to the Pennsylvania bar in 1895 and commenced practice in Uniontown. He was a delegate to the Democratic State conventions in 1898, 1899, 1900, and 1904.

Carr was elected as a Democrat to the Sixty-third Congress. He was an unsuccessful candidate for reelection in 1914. He resumed the practice of law and was appointed postmaster of Uniontown, Pennsylvania, in 1934 and served until his retirement in 1947. He died in Uniontown. Interment in Oak Grove Cemetery.

== Sources ==
- United States Congress. "Wooda N. Carr (id: C000180)". Biographical Directory of the United States Congress.
- The Political Graveyard

U.S. House of Representatives
Preceded by Thomas S. Crago	Member of the U.S. House of Representatives from Pennsylvania's 23rd congressional district 1913–1915	Succeeded by Robert F. Hopwood
