= Phelan Act of 1920 =

- Long title: An Act to amend the Act approved December 23, 1913, known as the Federal Reserve Act.
- Enacted by: the 66th United States Congress
- Effective: April 13, 1920

Citations
- Public law: Pub. L. 66–170
- Statutes at Large: 41 Stat. 550

Codification
- Acts amended: Federal Reserve Act
- Acts repealed: Section authorizing progressive discount rates repealed by the Agricultural Credits Act of 1923.

Legislative history
- Introduced in the House as H.R. 12711; Passed the House on February 1920; Passed the Senate on April 3, 1920; Signed into law by President Woodrow Wilson on April 13, 1920

The Phelan Act of 1920 refers to federal banking legislation adopted by the United States Congress on April 13, 1920. The act authorized Federal Reserve Banks to charge "progressive" discount rates to discourage excessive borrowing.

The FED district bank was given the option to enforce or deny the provision. In FED districts that accepted progressive rates, each member bank was given a line of credit or normal re-discount. This measure helped the banks with the difficult transition from wartime to peacetime. It bought member banks time to reorganize and renegotiate loans given to large defense contracting firms that would no longer be manufacturing high priced war munitions and material meant for sale to the government. With the government no longer purchasing, major firms would no longer be in a position to pay back large loans, and thus the banks that had lent them money to finance heavy production needed Federal assistance.
