= Lancaster Caramel Company =

Hershey's first successful candy company

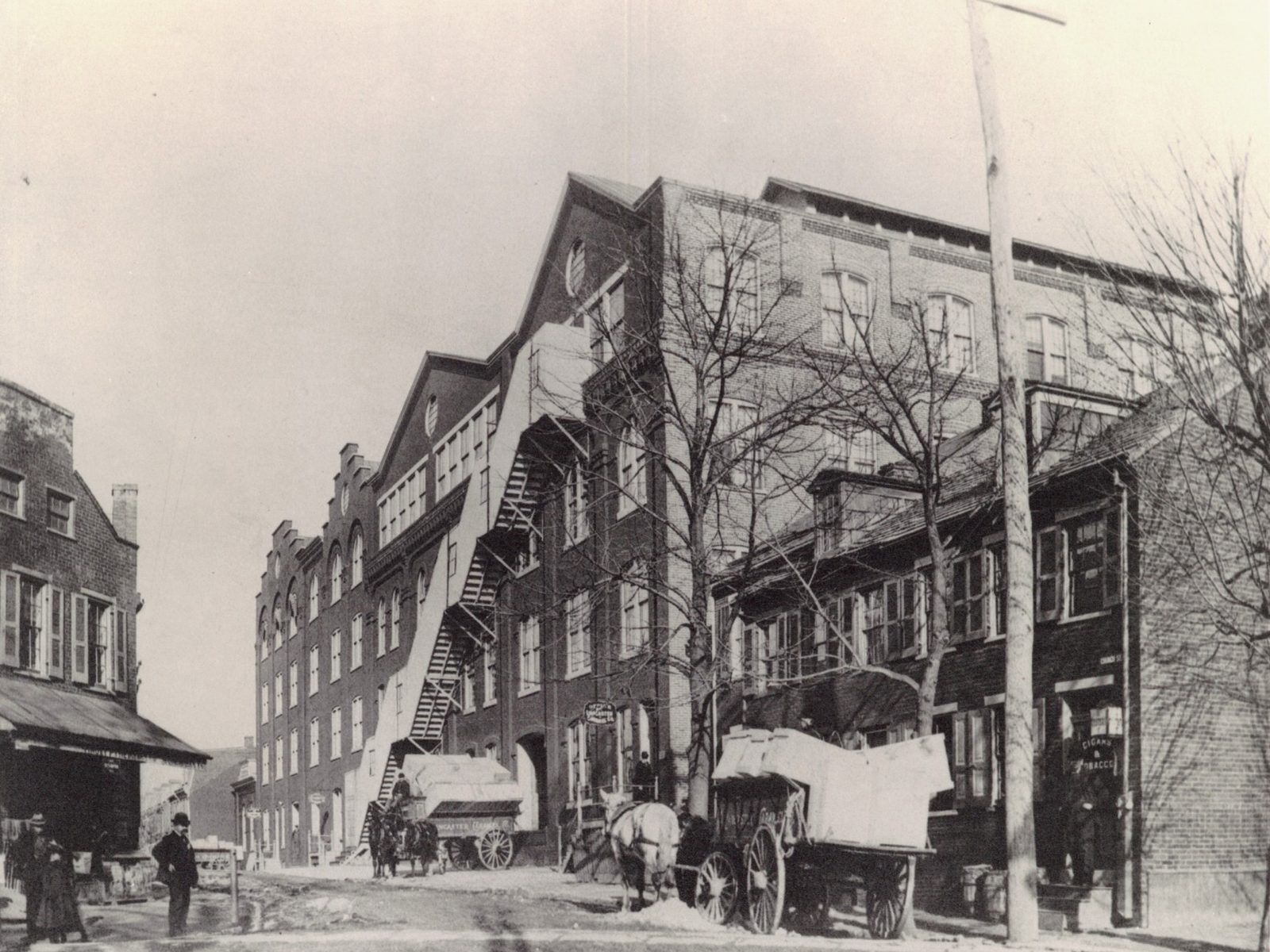
Lancaster Caramel Company c. 1896

The Lancaster Caramel Company was an American candy company based in Lancaster, Pennsylvania. It was founded by Milton S. Hershey in 1886, and was his first successful candy company which helped him build a reputation.

== History ==
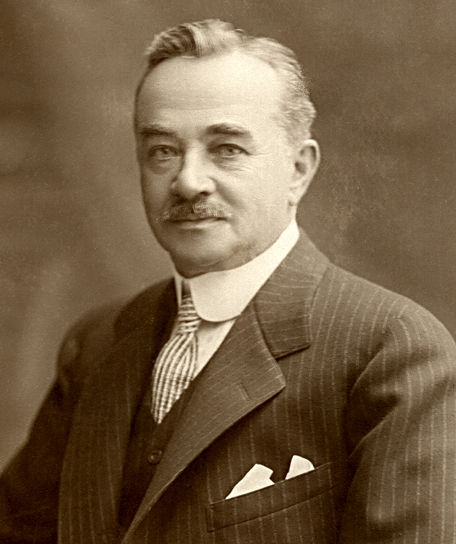
Milton S. Hershey, 1910

The business was first located in a warehouse on the west side of South Duke Street near Vine Street. However, the facilities lacked a boiler to cook the caramels and Hershey soon moved to an old factory building on Church Street that had once housed the Edison Electric Plant. The early months were a struggle, but a British candy importer placed a large order and the cashier at the Lancaster County National Bank backed a loan, enabling Hershey to purchase supplies. As the business began to grow, Hershey expanded into other parts of the factory building. By 1894 the Lancaster Caramel Company employed approximately 1300 workers.

In 1891 Hershey acquired three lots and a small factory in Mount Joy, Pennsylvania and the new factory soon began caramel production. In 1892, Lancaster Caramel Company expanded, opening a western branch in Chicago, which later moved to Bloomington, Illinois. The Bloomington factory operated until 1900 when it was sold to the Paul F. Beich Company. Shortly after establishing the Western Branch, Hershey set up a third caramel factory in Reading, Pennsylvania.

The Lancaster Caramel Company was incorporated on February 8, 1894 and the Hershey Chocolate Company was formally organized as a subsidiary. In the Spring of 1900, believing caramels were a fad, Milton Hershey sold the assets of the caramel business including the factory, the machinery, the confectionery formulas, stock on hand and the Crystal A trademark for $1 million in cash to the American Caramel Company. Hershey kept the Hershey Chocolate Company subsidiary plus the chocolate making equipment because he felt that there was a larger market for chocolate confections.

== The American Caramel Company ==
=== P.C. Wiest Co. ===
The American Caramel Company grew out of an industry established by Peter C. Wiest in 1867. He was a pioneer in the manufacture of caramels and soon developed a successful business. In 1878, Daniel F. Lafean became a partner and the firm of P. C. Wiest & Company was organized. The original proprietor retired from the business and in 1895 The P. C. Wiest Company was incorporated with Daniel F. Lafean as president. Lafean was instrumental in establishing the American Caramel Company; which was created March 28, 1898 when the Breisch-Hine Company in Philadelphia merged with The P. C. Wiest & Company in York, Pennsylvania. The home office of the American Caramel Company was located in York.

The American Caramel Company was created on March 28, 1889, when the Breisch-Hine Co. of Philadelphia and the P. C. Wiest Co. of York, Pennsylvania, merged. After acquiring the Lancaster Caramel Company in 1900, the American Caramel Company became famous by including baseball and other cards in with its candies. With the addition of the Lancaster Caramel Company, the American Caramel Company grew to control 90% of the caramel in the country. The American Caramel Company was one of the early businesses to issue Baseball Cards with their product. In December 1928, The American Caramel Company shut down the York Plant, moving the candy making machinery to a more modern facility.
