= Robert F. Hopwood =

American politician

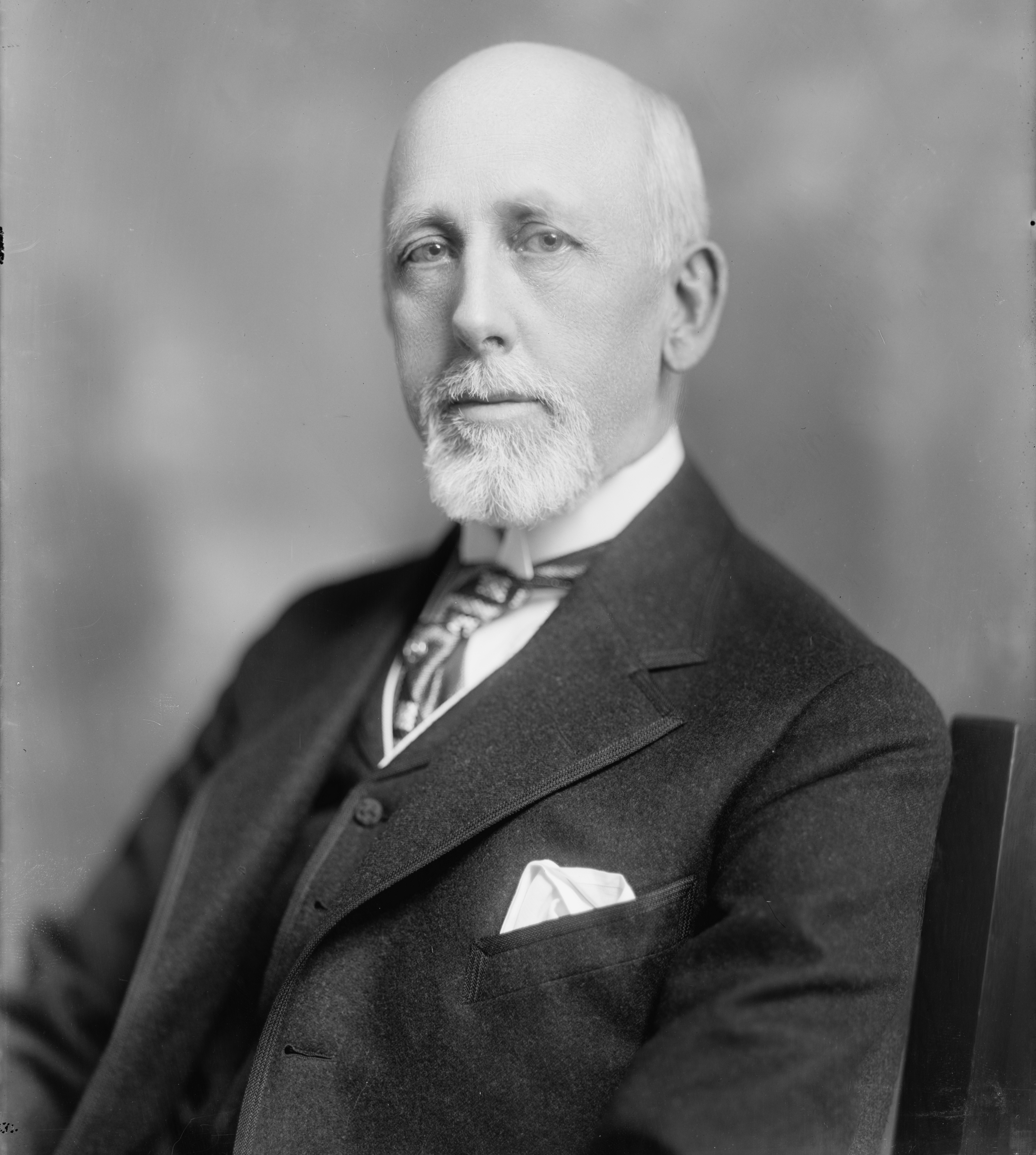

Member of the U.S. House of Representatives from Pennsylvania's 23rd district
- In office March 4, 1915 – March 3, 1917
- Preceded by: Wooda Nicholas Carr
- Succeeded by: Bruce Foster Sterling

Personal details
- Born: July 24, 1856 Uniontown, Pennsylvania, U.S.
- Died: March 1, 1940 (aged 84) St. Petersburg, Florida, U.S.
- Party: Republican

Robert Freeman Hopwood (July 24, 1856 – March 1, 1940) was a Republican member of the U.S. House of Representatives from Pennsylvania.

== Biography ==
Robert F. Hopwood was born in Uniontown, Pennsylvania. He studied under private teachers. He studied law, was admitted to the bar in 1879 and commenced practice in Uniontown. He was chairman of the Republican county committee. He served as attorney for Uniontown Borough from 1881 to 1891, solicitor of Fayette County, Pennsylvania, from 1894 to 1912, and president of the Uniontown Hospital from 1905 to 1920.

Hopwood was elected as a Republican to the Sixty-fourth Congress. He was an unsuccessful candidate for reelection in 1916. He resumed the practice of law in Uniontown. He died at his winter home in St. Petersburg, Florida. Interment in Oak Grove Cemetery in Uniontown.

== Sources ==
- United States Congress. "Robert F. Hopwood (id: H000785)". Biographical Directory of the United States Congress.
- The Political Graveyard

U.S. House of Representatives
Preceded by Wooda N. Carr	Member of the U.S. House of Representatives from Pennsylvania's 23rd congressional district 1915–1917	Succeeded by Bruce F. Sterling
