= Pennsylvania's 35th congressional district =

Former U.S. House district in Pennsylvania

Coordinates: 40°25′N 80°00′W

- Obsolete district
- Created: 1920
- Eliminated: 1940
- Years active: 1923-1943

Pennsylvania's 35th congressional district was one of Pennsylvania's districts of the United States House of Representatives.

== Geography ==
District boundaries eventually set to cover parts of Allegheny County, Pennsylvania, near Pittsburgh, Pennsylvania.

== List of members representing the district ==
Member	Party	Years	Cong ress	Electoral history
District established March 4, 1923
James M. Magee (Pittsburgh)	Republican	March 4, 1923 – March 3, 1927	68th 69th	Elected in 1922. Re-elected in 1924. Lost re-election.
Harry A. Estep (Pittsburgh)	Republican	March 4, 1927 – March 3, 1933	70th 71st 72nd	Elected in 1926. Re-elected in 1928. Re-elected in 1930. Redistricted to the 33rd district and lost re-election.
District dissolved March 3, 1933
