= Joseph McLaughlin (Pennsylvania politician) =

American politician

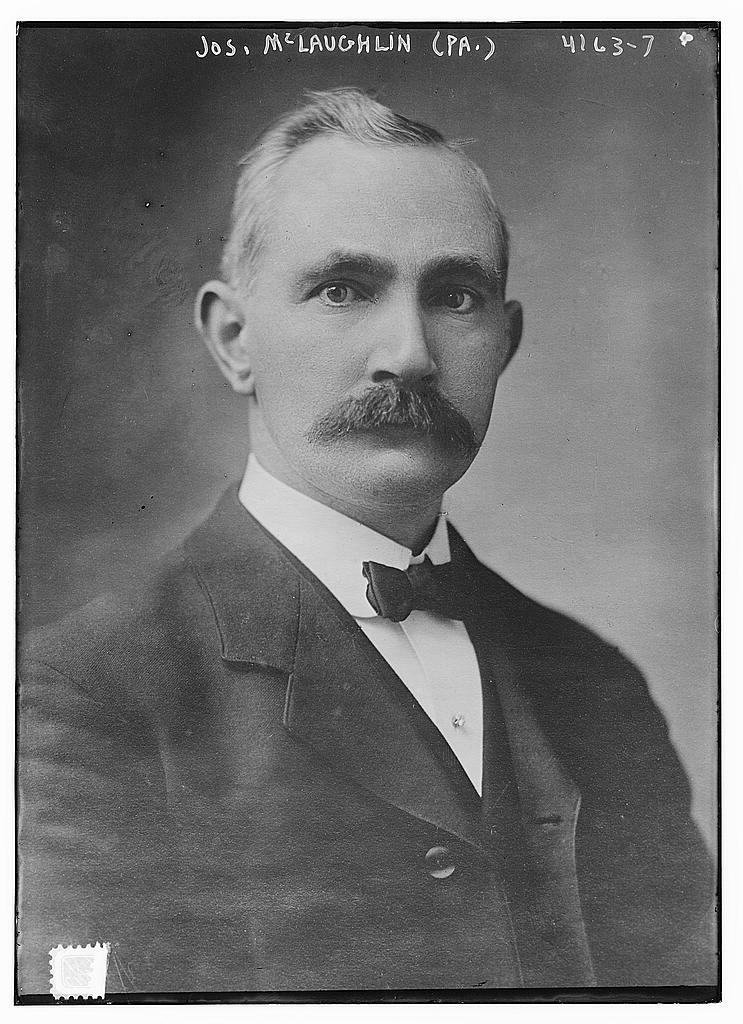
McLaughlin circa 1915

Joseph McLaughlin (June 9, 1867 – November 21, 1926) was a Republican member of the U.S. House of Representatives from Pennsylvania.

== Biography ==
Joseph McLaughlin was born in Burt, County Donegal, Ireland on June 9, 1867. He immigrated to the United States and settled in Philadelphia in 1889. He was employed as a mechanic in the Baldwin Locomotive Works and became shop superintendent of his department.

McLaughlin was elected as a Republican to the Sixty-fifth Congress. As a saloon keeper he voted against Prohibition while a member of the House. He was an unsuccessful candidate for renomination in 1918. He was elected to the Sixty-seventh Congress. He was not a candidate for renomination in 1922.

He died in Philadelphia, Pennsylvania on November 21, 1926. Interment in Holy Cross Cemetery, Yeadon, Pennsylvania.

== Sources ==
- United States Congress. "Joseph McLaughlin (id: M000540)". Biographical Directory of the United States Congress.

U.S. House of Representatives
Preceded by Daniel F. Lafean	Member of the U.S. House of Representatives from Pennsylvania's at-large congressional district 1917–1919	Succeeded by Anderson H. Walters
Preceded by Mahlon M. Garland	Member of the U.S. House of Representatives from Pennsylvania's at-large congressional district 1921–1923	Succeeded by Guy E. Campbell
