= Daniel F. Lafean =

American politician (1861–1922)

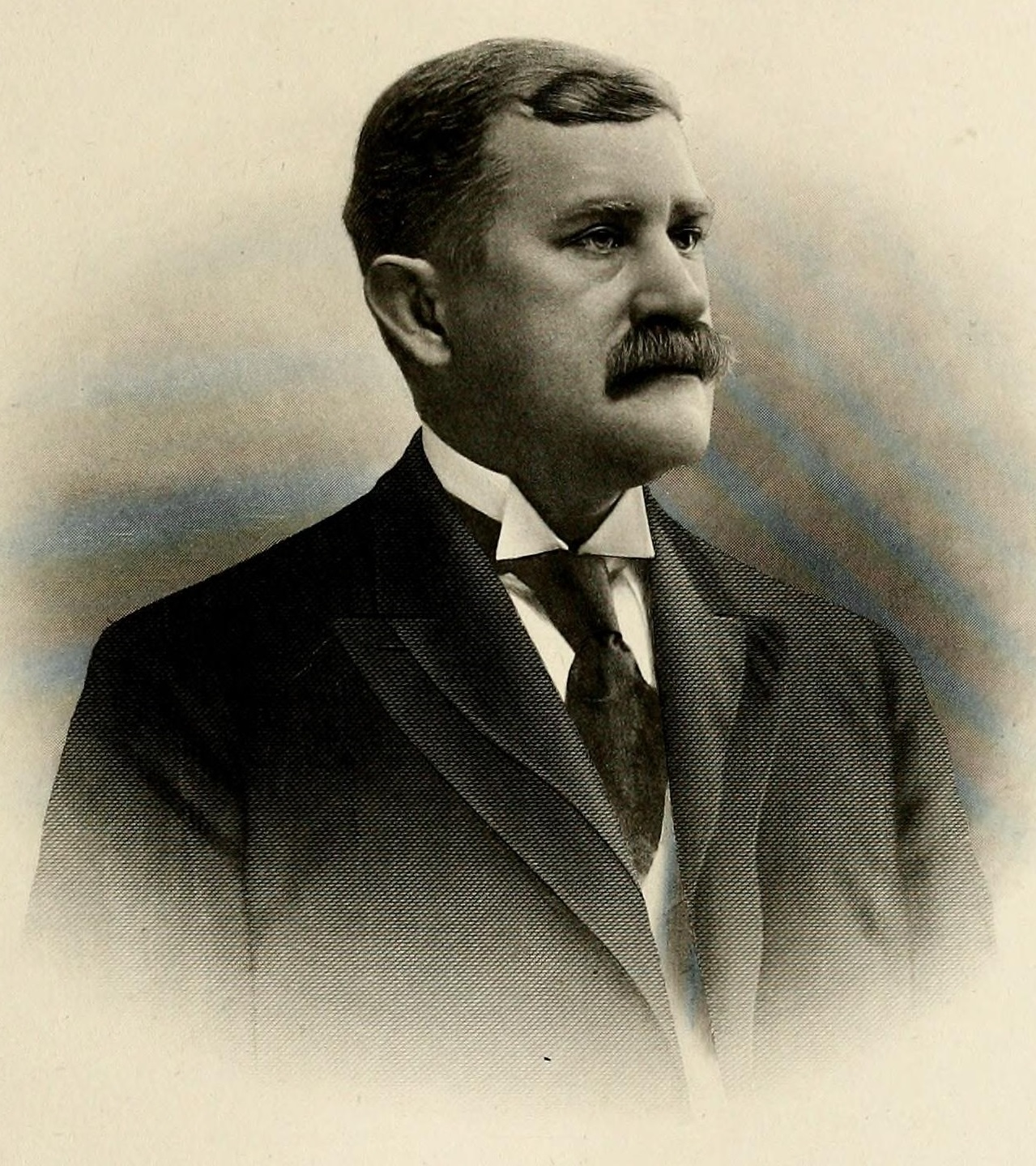
- Lafean in 1907

Member of the U.S. House of Representatives from Pennsylvania's at-large district
- In office March 4, 1915 – March 3, 1917
- Preceded by: Anderson H. Walters
- Succeeded by: Joseph McLaughlin

Member of the U.S. House of Representatives from Pennsylvania's 20th district
- In office March 4, 1903 – March 3, 1913
- Preceded by: Alvin Evans
- Succeeded by: Andrew R. Brodbeck

Personal details
- Born: February 7, 1861 York, Pennsylvania, U.S.
- Died: April 18, 1922 (aged 61) Philadelphia, Pennsylvania, U.S.
- Resting place: Prospect Hill Cemetery
- Party: Republican

Daniel Franklin Lafean (February 7, 1861 – April 18, 1922) was an American politician and businessman who was a member of the U.S. House of Representatives from Pennsylvania from 1903 to 1913 and again from 1915 to 1917. He was the first president of the American Caramel Company.

== Biography ==
Lafean was born in York, Pennsylvania, to German immigrants from Posen. He was engaged in candy manufacturing and in banking in York. He served as a director of the Gettysburg College and trustee of the Gettysburg Seminary in Gettysburg, Pennsylvania. He was the first president of the American Caramel Company and was later a co-founder and president of the Keystone Color Works. He was a Freemason and served as Worshipful Master of his lodge, Zeredatha Lodge No. 451, York, in 1895.

Lafean was elected as a Republican to the Fifty-eighth and to the four succeeding Congresses. He was an unsuccessful candidate for reelection in 1912. He was elected to the Sixty-fourth Congress, but was not a candidate for renomination in 1916. He was appointed commissioner of banking of the State of Pennsylvania in 1917. He again engaged in manufacturing pursuits and died in Philadelphia, Pennsylvania. He was interred in Prospect Hill Cemetery in York, Pennsylvania.

== Sources ==
- United States Congress. "Daniel F. Lafean (id: L000014)". Biographical Directory of the United States Congress.
- The Political Graveyard
- Lafean and York Fair of 100-Years-Ago – York Daily Record (Sep. 16, 2016)
- Zeredatha-White Rose Lodge No. 451, F.&A.M.

U.S. House of Representatives
Preceded by Alvin Evans	Member of the U.S. House of Representatives from Pennsylvania's 20th congressional district 1903–1913	Succeeded by Andrew R. Brodbeck
Preceded by Anderson H. Walters	Member of the U.S. House of Representatives from Pennsylvania's at-large congressional district 1915–1917	Succeeded by Joseph McLaughlin
