= John R. K. Scott =

American politician

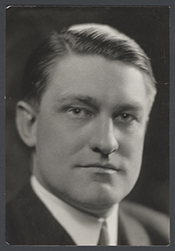
From the Biographical Directory of the United States Congress website

John Roger Kirkpatrick Scott (July 6, 1873 – December 9, 1945) was a Republican member of the U.S. House of Representatives from Pennsylvania.

John Roger Kirkpatrick Scott, father of Hardie Scott, was born in Bloomsburg, Pennsylvania, and moved with his parents to Wilkes-Barre, and later to Philadelphia.

He graduated from the Central High School of Philadelphia in 1893, and attended the law school of the University of Pennsylvania at Philadelphia. He was admitted to the bar in December 1895, and commenced the practice of law in Philadelphia. He was a member of the Pennsylvania State House of Representatives in 1899 and again in 1909, 1911, and 1913.

Scott was elected as a Republican to the Sixty-fourth and Sixty-fifth Congresses and served from March 4, 1915, until his resignation, effective on January 5, 1919.

== Sources ==
- United States Congress. "John R. K. Scott (id: S000180)". Biographical Directory of the United States Congress.

U.S. House of Representatives
Preceded by John M. Morin	Member of the U.S. House of Representatives from Pennsylvania's 34th congressional district 1915–1919	Succeeded by William J. Burke
