= Mahlon M. Garland =

American politician

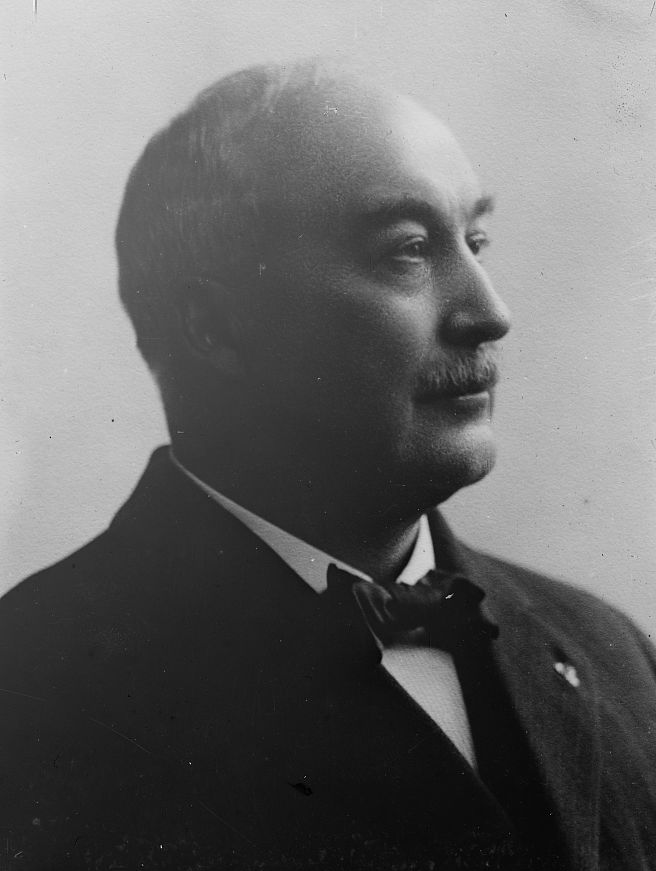

Member of the U.S. House of Representatives from Pennsylvania's at-large district
- In office March 4, 1915 – November 19, 1920
- Preceded by: Arthur R. Rupley
- Succeeded by: Thomas S. Crago

Personal details
- Born: Mahlon Morris Garland; May 4, 1856 Pittsburgh, Pennsylvania, U.S.
- Died: November 19, 1920 (aged 64) Washington, D.C., U.S.
- Resting place: Woodlawn Cemetery in Pittsburgh
- Party: Republican

Mahlon Morris Garland (May 4, 1856 – November 19, 1920) was an American labor leader and politician who served three terms as a Republican member of the U.S. House of Representatives from Pennsylvania from 1915 to 1920. He was reelected to a fourth term in Congress, but died in before the session began.

== Early life and career ==
Garland was born in Pittsburgh, Pennsylvania. He moved with his parents to Alexandria, Pennsylvania. He learned the trade of puddling and heating, and joined the Amalgamated Association of Iron, Steel and Tin Workers, and later became president for the organization. He was a member of the select council of Pittsburgh in 1886 and 1887.

== Political career ==
He was appointed by President William McKinley as the United States Collector of Customs (then called surveyor of customs) at Pittsburgh in 1898. He was reappointed by President Theodore Roosevelt in 1902 and 1906 and by President William Taft in 1910, serving until March 3, 1915.

He served as vice president of the American Federation of Labor, as member of the Pittsburgh School Board, and as a member of the borough council of Edgewood, Pennsylvania.

=== Congress ===
Garland was elected as a Republican to the Sixty-fourth, Sixty-fifth, and Sixty-sixth Congresses and served until his death. He served as Chairman of the United States House Committee on Mines and Mining during the Sixty-sixth Congress.

He had been reelected to the Sixty-seventh Congress, but died in Washington, D.C. on November 19, 1920, before the new session began. He is buried at Woodlawn Cemetery in Pittsburgh.

== See also ==
- List of members of the United States Congress who died in office (1900–1949)

== Sources ==
- United States Congress. "Mahlon M. Garland (id: G000068)". Biographical Directory of the United States Congress.
- The Political Graveyard
- Mahlon M. Garland, late a representative from Pennsylvania, Memorial addresses delivered in the House of Representatives and Senate frontispiece 1922

U.S. House of Representatives
Preceded by Arthur R. Rupley	Member of the U.S. House of Representatives from Pennsylvania's at-large congressional district 1915–1920	Succeeded by Thomas S. Crago
Trade union offices
Preceded by Thomas J. Elderkin	Fourth Vice-President of the American Federation of Labor; 1895–1898	Succeeded by John Mitchell
