= William J. Burke =

American politician and businessman (1862–1925)

William Joseph Burke
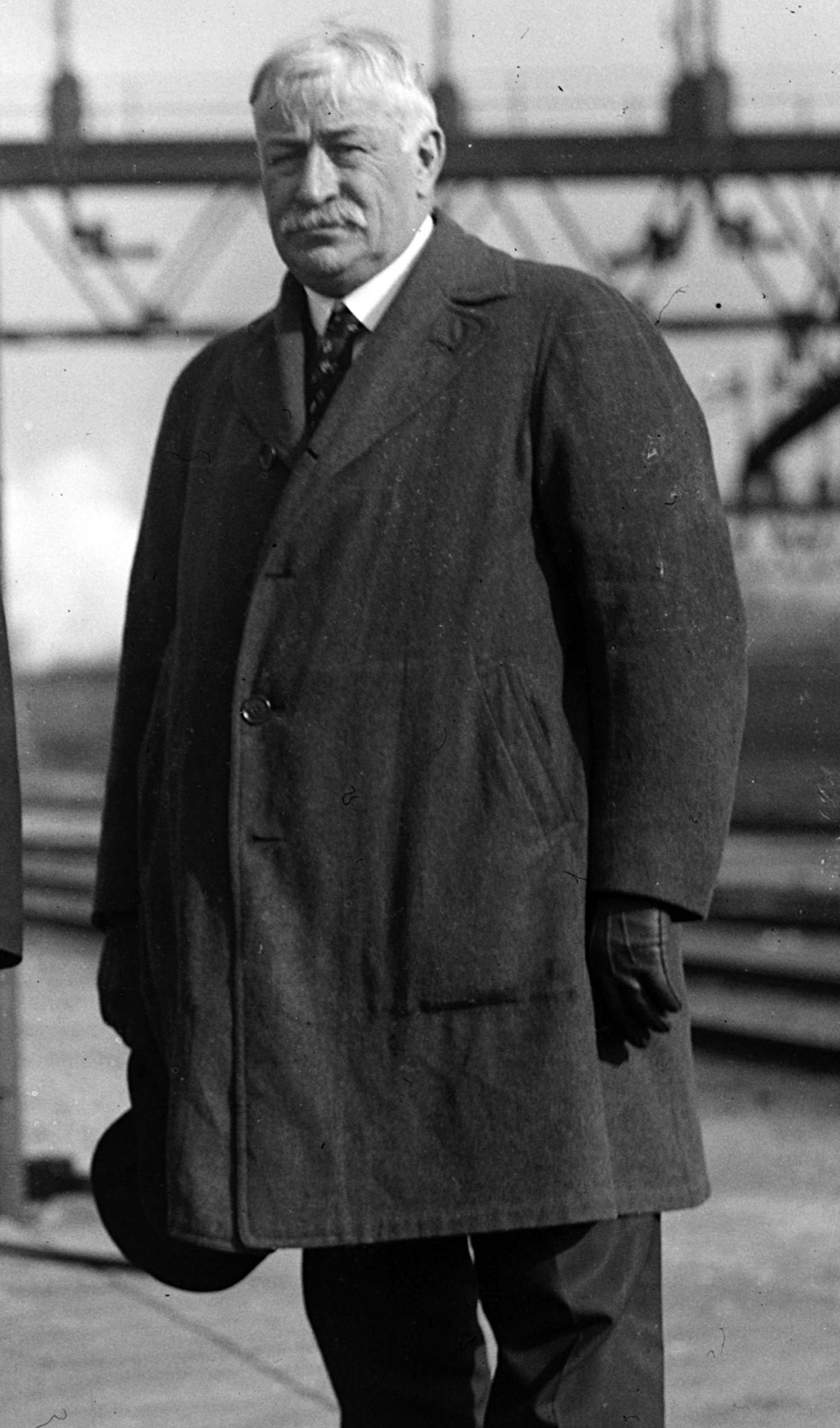

Member of the U.S. House of Representatives from Pennsylvania's at-large district
- In office March 4, 1919 – March 3, 1923
- Preceded by: John R.K. Scott
- Succeeded by: John M. Morin

Member of the Pennsylvania Senate
- In office 1915–1918

Personal details
- Born: September 25, 1862 London, England
- Died: November 7, 1925 (aged 63)
- Party: Republican

William Joseph Burke (September 25, 1862 – November 7, 1925) was a British-born American politician and businessman.

== Biography ==
Burke was born in London, England, of Irish parents. He served a four-year term on the Allegheny Common Council and from 1906 to 1910 was a member of the greater city council of Pittsburgh, until its merger with Allegheny City. Burke was a member of the Pennsylvania State Senate from 1915 to 1918. He was a U.S. representative from Pennsylvania from 1919 to 1923, as a member of the United States Republican Party. In 1922, he ran for the United States Senate from Pennsylvania as a member of the Progressive Party and came in third place, receiving 8% of the vote. In the early 1900s he became interested in the development of oil near Callery, Butler County. He was involved with organized labor as a chairman of the Order of Railroad Conductors. He was interred in the Roman Catholic Calvary Cemetery, Pittsburgh, Pennsylvania.

Party political offices
Preceded by None	Progressive nominee for U.S. Senator from Pennsylvania (Class 1); 1922	Succeeded by None
U.S. House of Representatives
Preceded by John R.K. Scott	Member of the U.S. House of Representatives from Pennsylvania's at-large congressional district 1919–1923	Succeeded by John M. Morin
