= 1920 United States House of Representatives elections =

House elections for the 67th U.S. Congress

- November 2, 1920 (Note: Maine held early elections on September 13, 1920.)

All 435 seats in the United States House of Representatives 218 seats needed for a majority
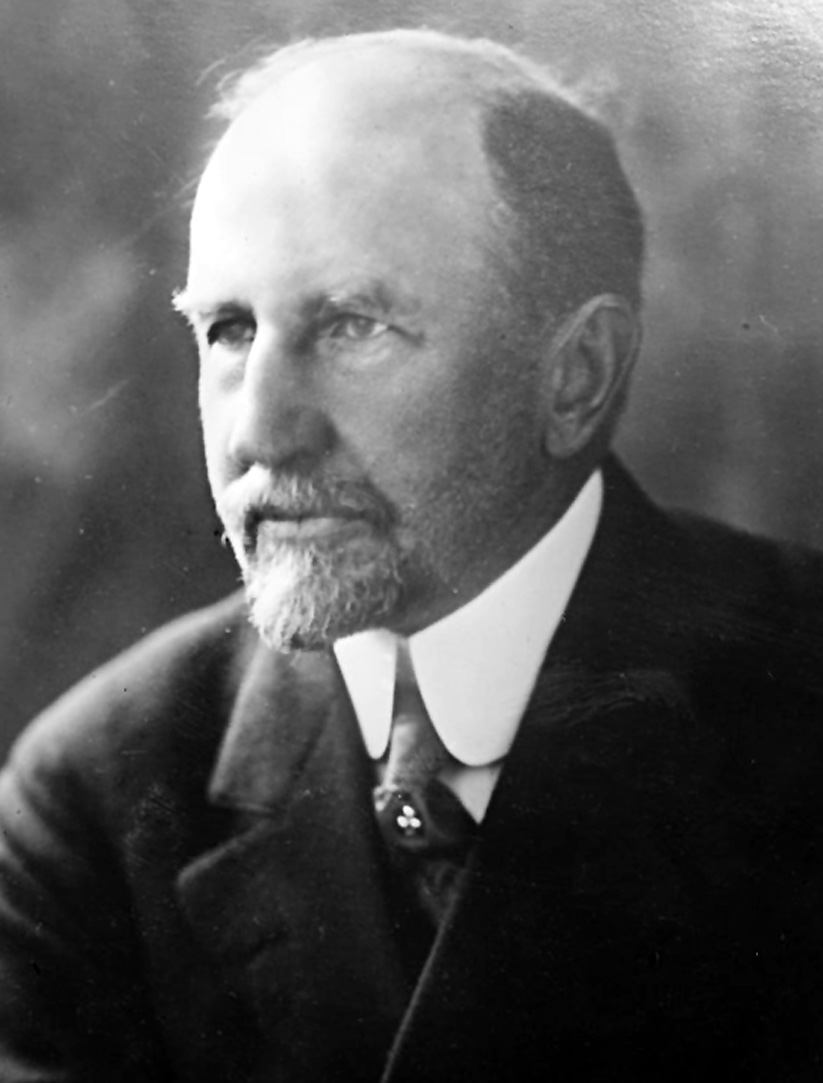

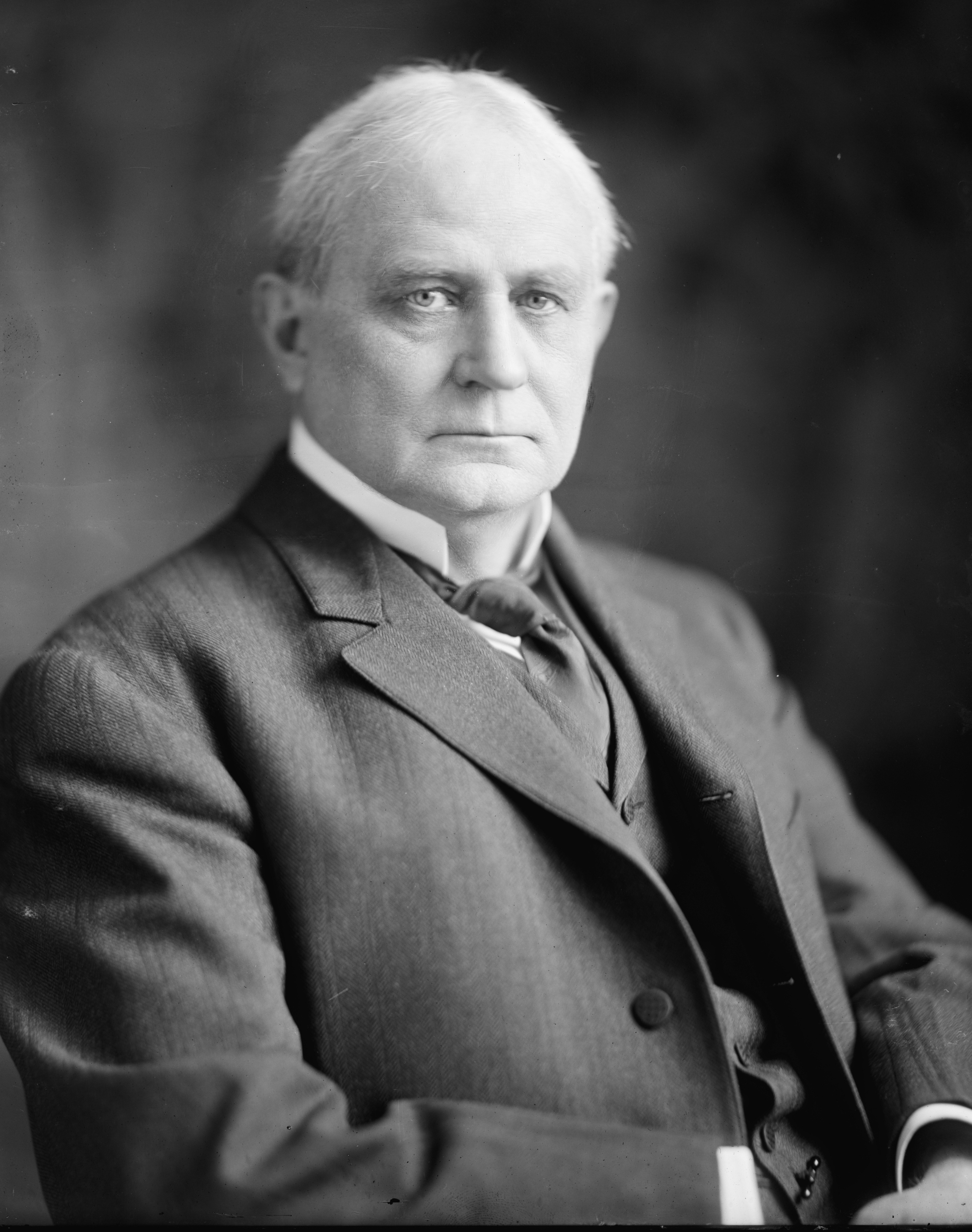
	Majority party	Minority party
Leader	Frederick Gillett	Champ Clark (lost re-election)
Party	Republican	Democratic
Leader since	May 19, 1919	March 4, 1909
Leader's seat	Massachusetts 2nd	Missouri 9th (lost re-election)
Last election	240 seats	192 seats
Seats won	302 (Note: Includes one Independent Republican.)	131
Seat change	▲63	▼61
Popular vote	14,803,673	8,903,730
Percentage	58.82%	35.38%
Swing	▲5.56pp	▼7.77pp
	Third party	Fourth party
Party	Socialist	Prohibition
Last election	1 seat	1 seat
Seats won	1	0
Seat change	Steady	▼1
Popular vote	648,577	176,811
Percentage	2.58%	0.70%
Swing	▼0.64pp	▼0.25pp
	Fifth party
Party	Independent
Last election	1 seat
Seats won	1 (Note: Milton Shreve failed to attain renomination from the Republican Party in the 25th district of Pennsylvania, and won reelection over Republican candidate Robert Firman as an independent with support from the Prohibition Party.)
Seat change	Steady
- Results: Democratic hold Democratic gain Republican hold Republican gain Socialist hold Independent gain
Speaker before election
Frederick Gillett
Republican
Elected Speaker
Frederick Gillett
Republican

The 1920 United States House of Representatives elections were elections for the United States House of Representatives to elect members to serve in the 67th United States Congress. They were held for the most part on November 2, 1920, while Maine held its on September 13. They coincided with the election of President Warren G. Harding, the first time that women in all states were allowed to vote in federal elections after the passage of the 19th Amendment.

The incumbent Democratic administration of Woodrow Wilson lost popularity after the conclusion of World War I in 1918, as American voters hoped to return to isolationism and avoid military conflict in the future. Heedless of the prevailing national mood, Wilson advocated American leadership in a new international order under the League of Nations, alienated voters of German and Irish ancestry, and constantly struggled with a Congress controlled by the opposition Republican Party.

Harding and the Republicans promised a new start for the nation and a disassociation from Europe's political troubles that most voters found appealing. As a result, the Republicans picked up 63 seats in the House of Representatives, with most of the gains coming from Democratic-leaning districts in the big industrial cities and the border states. Many of these districts elected Republican representatives for the only time in decades, and House Democratic leader Champ Clark was among those who lost reelection. Clark died 2 days before his term expired.

Although the Southern United States remained solidly Democratic for the most part, the Republicans secured more than 90% of the seats outside the South, which gave them their largest majority of the 20th century and as of 2026, their greatest number of seats ever. The 67th Congress is the most recent in which the Republican Party won greater than a two-thirds majority of seats in either chamber.

== Election summaries ==
↓
132	1	302
Democratic	(Note: There was one Socialist.)	Republican

Source: Election Statistics - Office of the Clerk

State	Type	Total seats	Democratic		Republican		Others	
State	Type	Total seats	Seats	Change	Seats	Change	Seats	Change
Alabama	Districts	10	10	Steady	0	Steady	0	Steady
Arizona	At-large	1	1	Steady	0	Steady	0	Steady
Arkansas	Districts	7	7	Steady	0	Steady	0	Steady
California	Districts	11	2	▼2	9	▲3	0	▼1 (Note: Prohibition)
Colorado	Districts	4	1	Steady	3	Steady	0	Steady
Connecticut	Districts	5	0	▼1	5	▲1	0	Steady
Delaware	At-large	1	0	Steady	1	Steady	0	Steady
Florida	Districts	4	4	Steady	0	Steady	0	Steady
Georgia	Districts	12	12	Steady	0	Steady	0	Steady
Idaho	Districts	2	0	Steady	2	Steady	0	Steady
Illinois	Districts +2 at-large	27	3	▼2	24	▲2	0	Steady
Indiana	Districts	13	0	Steady	13	Steady	0	Steady
Iowa	Districts	11	0	Steady	11	Steady	0	Steady
Kansas	Districts	8	0	▼1	8	▲1	0	Steady
Kentucky	Districts	11	8	▲1	3	▼1	0	Steady
Louisiana	Districts	8	8	Steady	0	Steady	0	Steady
Maine (Note: Elections held early.)	Districts	4	0	Steady	4	Steady	0	Steady
Maryland	Districts	6	2	▼1	4	▲1	0	Steady
Massachusetts	Districts	16	2	▼2	14	▲2	0	Steady
Michigan	Districts	13	0	▼1	13	▲1	0	Steady
Minnesota	Districts	10	0	▼1	10	▲2	0	▼1 (Note: Farmer–Labor)
Mississippi	Districts	8	8	Steady	0	Steady	0	Steady
Missouri	Districts	16	2	▼9	14	▲9	0	Steady
Montana	Districts	2	0	▼1	2	▲1	0	Steady
Nebraska	Districts	6	0	Steady	6	Steady	0	Steady
Nevada	At-large	1	0	▼1	1	▲1	0	Steady
New Hampshire	Districts	2	0	Steady	2	Steady	0	Steady
New Jersey	Districts	12	1	▼4	11	▲4	0	Steady
New Mexico	At-large	1	0	Steady	1	Steady	0	Steady
New York	Districts	43	9	▼10	33	▲9	1 (Note: Socialist)	▲1
North Carolina	Districts	10	10	Steady	0	Steady	0	Steady
North Dakota	Districts	3	0	Steady	3	Steady	0	Steady
Ohio	Districts	22	0	▼8	22	▲8	0	Steady
Oklahoma	Districts	8	3	▼4	5	▲4	0	Steady
Oregon	Districts	3	0	Steady	3	Steady	0	Steady
Pennsylvania	Districts +4at-large	36	1	▼5	35 (Note: Includes 1 Independent Republican.)	▲5	0	Steady
Rhode Island	Districts	3	0	Steady	3	Steady	0	Steady
South Carolina	Districts	7	7	Steady	0	Steady	0	Steady
South Dakota	Districts	3	0	▼1	3	▲1	0	Steady
Tennessee	Districts	10	5	▼3	5	▲3	0	Steady
Texas	Districts	18	17	▼1	1	▲1	0	Steady
Utah	Districts	2	0	▼2	2	▲2	0	Steady
Vermont	Districts	2	0	Steady	2	Steady	0	Steady
Virginia	Districts	10	9	Steady	1	Steady	0	Steady
Washington	Districts	5	0	Steady	5	Steady	0	Steady
West Virginia	Districts	6	0	▼1	6	▲1	0	Steady
Wisconsin	Districts	11	0	Steady	11	▲1	0	▼1 (Note: Socialist)
Wyoming	At-large	1	0	Steady	1	Steady	0	Steady
Total		435	132 30.3%	▼60	302 (Note: Includes 1 Independent Republican.) 69.4%	▲62	1 0.2%	▼2

House seats
Democratic	30.11%
Republican	69.66%
Socialist	0.23%

Results shaded according to winner's share of the vote

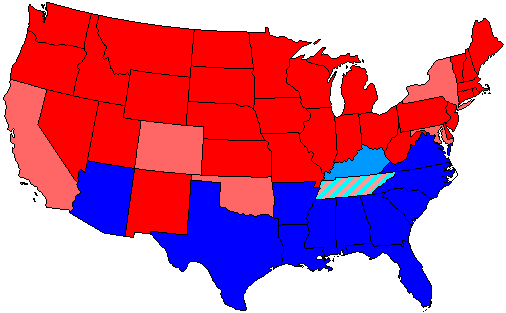
Seats by party holding plurality in state: 80+% Democratic / 80+% Republican; 60+% to 80% Democratic / 60+% to 80% Republican; Up to 60% Democratic / Up to 60% Republican

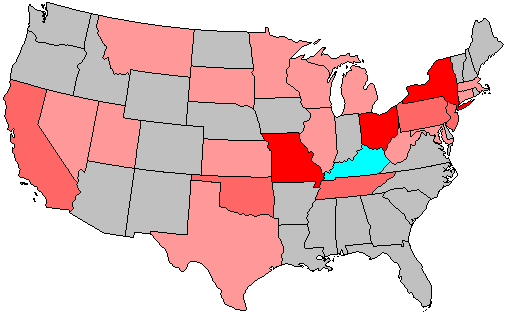
Net gain in party representation: 6+ Democratic gain / 6+ Republican gain; 3-5 Democratic gain / 3-5 Republican gain; 1-2 Democratic gain / 1-2 Republican gain; no net change

== Special elections ==
District	Incumbent			This race	
District	Member	Party	First elected	Results	Candidates
Virginia 4	Walter A. Watson	Democratic	1912	Incumbent died December 24, 1919. New member elected April 27, 1920. Democratic hold.	▌ ✓ Patrick H. Drewry (Democratic) 100%
Virginia 5	Edward W. Saunders	Democratic	1906 (special)	Incumbent resigned February 29, 1920 to join the Supreme Court of Virginia. New member elected June 1, 1920. Democratic hold.	▌ ✓ Rorer A. James (Democratic) 100.0%
Michigan 13	Charles A. Nichols	Republican	1914	Incumbent died April 25, 1920. New member elected November 2, 1920. Republican hold.	▌ ✓ Clarence J. McLeod (Republican) 72.8%; ▌James H. Lee (Democratic) 27.2%
New Jersey 1	William J. Browning	Republican	1911 (special)	Incumbent died March 24, 1920. New member elected November 2, 1920. Republican hold.	▌ ✓ Francis F. Patterson Jr. (Republican) 67.2%; ▌William P. Kramer (Democratic) 28.4%; ▌Jennie S. Sharpe (Prohibition) 4.4%
New York 14	Fiorello La Guardia	Republican	1916	Incumbent resigned December 31, 1919. New member elected November 2, 1920. Republican hold.	▌ ✓ Nathan D. Perlman (Republican) 67.9%; ▌Algernon Lee (Socialist) 32.1%
New York 26	Edmund Platt	Republican	1912	Incumbent resigned June 7, 1920 to join the Federal Reserve Board. New member elected November 2, 1920. Republican hold.	▌ ✓ Hamilton Fish III (Republican) 63.6%; ▌Rosslyn M. Cox (Democratic) 33.2%; ▌James C. Hogan (Socialist) 3.2%
Pennsylvania 3	J. Hampton Moore	Republican	1906 (special)	Incumbent resigned January 4, 1920 when elected Mayor of Philadelphia. New member elected November 2, 1920. Republican hold.	▌ ✓ Harry C. Ransley (Republican) 76.7%; ▌Joseph Hagerty (Democratic) 18.6%; ▌Ed Maurer (Socialist) 4.4%; ▌Godfrey Stringer (Prohibition) 0.4%
Alabama 5	J. Thomas Heflin	Democratic	1904	Incumbent resigned November 1, 1920 when elected U.S. senator. New member elected December 14, 1920. Democratic hold.	▌ ✓ William B. Bowling (Democratic) 100.0%

== Alabama ==
District	Incumbent			This race	
District	Member	Party	First elected	Results	Candidates
Alabama 1	John McDuffie	Democratic	1918	Incumbent re-elected.	▌ ✓ John McDuffie (Democratic) 98.7%; ▌C. H. Hutchinson (Socialist) 1.3%
Alabama 2	S. Hubert Dent Jr.	Democratic	1908	Incumbent lost renomination. Democratic hold.	▌ ✓ John R. Tyson (Democratic) 99.6%; ▌Edward J. Green (Socialist) 0.4%
Alabama 3	Henry B. Steagall	Democratic	1914	Incumbent re-elected.	▌ ✓ Henry B. Steagall (Democratic) 83.2%; ▌Dallas B. Smith (Republican) 16.8%
Alabama 4	Fred L. Blackmon	Democratic	1910	Incumbent re-elected but died before start of the next Congress.	▌ ✓ Fred L. Blackmon (Democratic) 59.7%; ▌A. P. Longshore (Republican) 40.3%
Alabama 5	J. Thomas Heflin	Democratic	1904	Incumbent resigned when elected U.S. senator. Democratic hold. Winner took seat December 14, 1920.	▌ ✓ William B. Bowling (Democratic) 73.5%; ▌W. M. Russell (Republican) 26.5%
Alabama 6	William B. Oliver	Democratic	1914	Incumbent re-elected.	▌ ✓ William B. Oliver (Democratic); Uncontested
Alabama 7	Lilius B. Rainey	Democratic	1918	Incumbent re-elected.	▌ ✓ Lilius B. Rainey (Democratic) 50.5%; ▌Charles B. Kennamer (Republican) 49.0%; ▌J. O. Meadows (Socialist) 0.5%
Alabama 8	Edward B. Almon	Democratic	1914	Incumbent re-elected.	▌ ✓ Edward B. Almon (Democratic) 76.4%; ▌W. E. Hotchkiss (Republican) 23.0%; ▌Fred L. Gentry (Socialist) 0.6%
Alabama 9	George Huddleston	Democratic	1914	Incumbent re-elected.	▌ ✓ George Huddleston (Democratic) 85.4%; ▌Alex C. Birch (Republican) 14.2%; ▌Cox (Socialist) 0.4%
Alabama 10	William B. Bankhead	Democratic	1916	Incumbent re-elected.	▌ ✓ William B. Bankhead (Democratic) 52.6%; ▌William L. Chenault (Republican) 46.7%; ▌C. H. Walker (Socialist) 0.6%

== Arizona ==
Results by county Hayden: 50–60% 60–70% Dunseath : 50–60%

District	Incumbent			This race	
District	Member	Party	First elected	Results	Candidates
Arizona at-large	Carl Hayden	Democratic	1911	Incumbent re-elected.	▌ ✓ Carl Hayden (Democratic) 57.8%; ▌James A. Dunseath (Republican) 42.2%

== Arkansas ==
District	Incumbent			This race	
District	Member	Party	First elected	Results	Candidates
Arkansas 1	Thaddeus H. Caraway	Democratic	1912	Incumbent retired to run for U.S. senator. Democratic hold.	▌ ✓ William J. Driver (Democratic) 73.6%; ▌H. M. Mayes (Republican) 26.4%
Arkansas 2	William A. Oldfield	Democratic	1908	Incumbent re-elected.	▌ ✓ William A. Oldfield (Democratic) 66.4%; ▌Thad Rowden (Republican) 33.6%
Arkansas 3	John N. Tillman	Democratic	1914	Incumbent re-elected.	▌ ✓ John N. Tillman (Democratic) 53.3%; ▌John I. Worthington (Republican) 46.7%
Arkansas 4	Otis Wingo	Democratic	1912	Incumbent re-elected.	▌ ✓ Otis Wingo (Democratic) 64.1%; ▌W. H. Dunblazier (Republican) 35.9%
Arkansas 5	Henderson M. Jacoway	Democratic	1910	Incumbent re-elected.	▌ ✓ Henderson M. Jacoway (Democratic) 72.5%; ▌George A. McConnell (Republican) 27.5%
Arkansas 6	Samuel M. Taylor	Democratic	1910	Incumbent re-elected.	▌ ✓ Samuel M. Taylor (Democratic) 69.4%; ▌W. R. Day (Republican) 30.6%
Arkansas 7	William S. Goodwin	Democratic	1910	Incumbent lost renomination. Democratic hold.	▌ ✓ Tilman B. Parks (Democratic) 72.2%; ▌J. C. Russell (Republican) 27.8%

== California ==
District	Incumbent			This race	
District	Member	Party	First elected	Results	Candidates
California 1	Clarence F. Lea	Democratic	1916	Incumbent re-elected.	▌ ✓ Clarence F. Lea (Democratic) 61.7%; ▌C. A. Bodwell Jr. (Republican) 33.3%; ▌A. K. Gifford (Socialist) 5.0%
California 2	John E. Raker	Democratic	1910	Incumbent re-elected.	▌ ✓ John E. Raker (Democratic); Uncontested
California 3	Charles F. Curry	Republican	1912	Incumbent re-elected.	▌ ✓ Charles F. Curry (Republican) 74.7%; ▌J. W. Struckenbruck (Democratic) 20.4%; ▌Miles William Beck (Socialist) 4.9%
California 4	Julius Kahn	Republican	1898	Incumbent re-elected.	▌ ✓ Julius Kahn (Republican) 84.6%; ▌Milton Harlan (Socialist) 15.4%
California 5	John I. Nolan	Republican	1912	Incumbent re-elected.	▌ ✓ John I. Nolan (Republican) 81.8%; ▌Thomas Conway (Socialist) 18.2%
California 6	John A. Elston	Republican	1914	Incumbent re-elected.	▌ ✓ John A. Elston (Republican) 83.3%; ▌Maynard Shipley (Democratic) 16.7%
California 7	Henry E. Barbour	Republican	1918	Incumbent re-elected.	▌ ✓ Henry E. Barbour (Republican) 87.2%; ▌Harry M. McKee (Socialist) 12.8%
California 8	Hugh S. Hersman	Democratic	1918	Incumbent lost re-election. Republican gain.	▌ ✓ Arthur M. Free (Republican) 64%; ▌Hugh S. Hersman (Democratic) 36%
California 9	Charles H. Randall	Prohibition	1914	Incumbent lost re-election. Republican gain.	▌ ✓ Charles F. Van de Water (Republican) 59.7%; ▌Charles H. Randall (Prohibition) 34.8%; ▌Mary E. Garbutt (Socialist) 5.5%
California 10	Henry Z. Osborne	Republican	1916	Incumbent re-elected.	▌ ✓ Henry Z. Osborne (Republican) 82.7%; ▌Upton Sinclair (Socialist) 17.3%
California 11	William Kettner	Democratic	1912	Incumbent retired. Republican gain.	▌ ✓ Phil Swing (Republican) 72.9%; ▌Hugh L. Dickson (Democratic) 27.1%

== Colorado ==
District	Incumbent			This race	
District	Member	Party	First elected	Results	Candidates
Colorado 1	William N. Vaile	Republican	1918	Incumbent re-elected.	▌ ✓ William N. Vaile (Republican) 66.9%; ▌Benjamin Hilliard (Democratic) 33.1%
Colorado 2	Charles B. Timberlake	Republican	1914	Incumbent re-elected.	▌ ✓ Charles B. Timberlake (Republican) 66.4%; ▌A. F. Browns (Democratic) 33.6%
Colorado 3	Guy U. Hardy	Republican	1918	Incumbent re-elected.	▌ ✓ Guy U. Hardy (Republican) 57.7%; ▌Samuel J. Burris (Democratic) 42.3%
Colorado 4	Edward T. Taylor	Democratic	1908	Incumbent re-elected.	▌ ✓ Edward T. Taylor (Democratic) 55.3%; ▌Merle D. Vincent (Republican) 44.7%

== Connecticut ==
District	Incumbent			This race	
District	Member	Party	First elected	Results	Candidates
Connecticut 1	Augustine Lonergan	Democratic	1916	Incumbent retired to run for U.S. senator. Republican gain.	▌ ✓ E. Hart Fenn (Republican) 60.5%; ▌Joseph S. Dutton (Democratic) 34.8%; ▌Henry Vanderburgh (Socialist) 2.8%; Others: ▌Daniel Stewart (Farmer–Labor) 1.2%; ▌B. J. Beardsley (Prohibition) 0.7%
Connecticut 2	Richard P. Freeman	Republican	1914	Incumbent re-elected.	▌ ✓ Richard P. Freeman (Republican) 63.7%; ▌Thomas R. Murray (Democratic) 33.7%; Others: ▌George H. Moles (Socialist) 1.5%; ▌John R. Parkhurst (Prohibition) 0.7%; ▌Albert H. Frink (Socialist Labor) 0.3%
Connecticut 3	John Q. Tilson	Republican	1914	Incumbent re-elected.	▌ ✓ John Q. Tilson (Republican) 63.7%; ▌William F. Alcorn (Democratic) 31.4%; ▌John Guetens (Socialist) 4.5%; ▌William F. Alcorn (Prohibition) 0.4%
Connecticut 4	Schuyler Merritt	Republican	1916	Incumbent re-elected.	▌ ✓ Schuyler Merritt (Republican) 66.3%; ▌Harry J. Platt (Democratic) 30.4%; ▌Jasper McLevy (Socialist) 2.7%; ▌Samuel Lavit (Prohibition) 0.5%
Connecticut 5	James P. Glynn	Republican	1914	Incumbent re-elected.	▌ ✓ James P. Glynn (Republican) 58.7%; ▌Martin L. Caine (Democratic) 38.9%; ▌Hugh B. Sanderson (Socialist) 2.4%

== Delaware ==
District	Incumbent			This race	
District	Member	Party	First elected	Results	Candidates
Delaware at-large	Caleb R. Layton	Republican	1918	Incumbent re-elected.	▌ ✓ Caleb R. Layton (Republican) 55.7%; ▌James R. Clements (Democratic) 43.0%; ▌Robert A. Walker (Socialist) 1.1%; ▌Howard T. Ennis (Independent) 0.2%

== Florida ==
District	Incumbent			This race	
District	Member	Party	First elected	Results	Candidates
Florida 1	Herbert J. Drane	Democratic	1916	Incumbent re-elected.	▌ ✓ Herbert J. Drane (Democratic) 78.1%; ▌H. B. Jeffries (Republican) 14.0%; ▌C. W. Hains (White Republican) 4.8%; ▌C. W. Smith (Socialist) 3.2%
Florida 2	Frank Clark	Democratic	1904	Incumbent re-elected.	▌ ✓ Frank Clark (Democratic) 84.9%; ▌Fred Cubberly (Republican) 13.4%; ▌W. L. Case (Socialist) 1.7%
Florida 3	John H. Smithwick	Democratic	1918	Incumbent re-elected.	▌ ✓ John H. Smithwick (Democratic) 86.2%; ▌Millard M. Owens (Republican) 13.8%
Florida 4	William J. Sears	Democratic	1914	Incumbent re-elected.	▌ ✓ William J. Sears (Democratic) 74.4%; ▌C. D. Bowen (Republican) 21.7%; ▌Earl Hunt (Socialist) 3.9%

== Georgia ==
District	Incumbent			This race	
District	Member	Party	First elected	Results	Candidates
Georgia 1	James W. Overstreet	Democratic	1916	Incumbent re-elected.	▌ ✓ James W. Overstreet (Democratic) 82.4%; ▌E. S. Fuller (Republican) 17.6%
Georgia 2	Frank Park	Democratic	1912	Incumbent re-elected.	▌ ✓ Frank Park (Democratic); Uncontested
Georgia 3	Charles R. Crisp	Democratic	1912	Incumbent re-elected.	▌ ✓ Charles R. Crisp (Democratic) 92.6%; ▌H. E. Locket (Republican) 7.4%
Georgia 4	William C. Wright	Democratic	1918	Incumbent re-elected.	▌ ✓ William C. Wright (Democratic); Uncontested
Georgia 5	William D. Upshaw	Democratic	1918	Incumbent re-elected.	▌ ✓ William D. Upshaw (Democratic) 70.1%; ▌John W. Martin (Republican) 29.9%
Georgia 6	James W. Wise	Democratic	1914	Incumbent re-elected.	▌ ✓ James W. Wise (Democratic) 97.7%; ▌E. L. Wheaton (Republican) 2.3%
Georgia 7	Gordon Lee	Democratic	1904	Incumbent re-elected.	▌ ✓ Gordon Lee (Democratic) 99.6%; ▌A. L. Weaver (Republican) .4%
Georgia 8	Charles H. Brand	Democratic	1916	Incumbent re-elected.	▌ ✓ Charles H. Brand (Democratic); Uncontested
Georgia 9	Thomas M. Bell	Democratic	1904	Incumbent re-elected.	▌ ✓ Thomas M. Bell (Democratic) 62.3%; ▌O. L. Barnwell (Republican) 37.7%
Georgia 10	Carl Vinson	Democratic	1914	Incumbent re-elected.	▌ ✓ Carl Vinson (Democratic); Uncontested
Georgia 11	William C. Lankford	Democratic	1918	Incumbent re-elected.	▌ ✓ William C. Lankford (Democratic); Uncontested
Georgia 12	William W. Larsen	Democratic	1916	Incumbent re-elected.	▌ ✓ William W. Larsen (Democratic); Uncontested

== Idaho ==
District	Incumbent			This race	
District	Member	Party	First elected	Results	Candidates
Idaho 1	Burton L. French	Republican	1916	Incumbent re-elected.	▌ ✓ Burton L. French (Republican) 59.3%; ▌Nell Kruegel Irion (Democratic) 26.0%; ▌Riley Rice (Independent) 14.7%
Idaho 2	Addison T. Smith	Republican	1912	Incumbent re-elected.	▌ ✓ Addison T. Smith (Republican) 63.0%; ▌W. P. Whitaker (Democratic) 37.0%

== Illinois ==
District	Incumbent			This race	
District	Member	Party	First elected	Results	Candidates
Illinois 1	Martin B. Madden	Republican	1904	Incumbent re-elected.	▌ ✓ Martin B. Madden (Republican) 75.9%; ▌James A. Gorman (Democratic) 22.5%; ▌Willis E. Davis (Socialist) 1.6%
Illinois 2	James R. Mann	Republican	1896	Incumbent re-elected.	▌ ✓ James R. Mann (Republican) 72.9%; ▌James J. Leddy (Democratic) 23.5%; ▌Bernard Berlyn (Socialist) 3.6%
Illinois 3	William W. Wilson	Republican	1914	Incumbent retired. Republican hold.	▌ ✓ Elliott W. Sproul (Republican) 67.4%; ▌Thomas M. Crane (Democratic) 28.1%; ▌Kellam Foster (Socialist) 3.7%; ▌George W. Stone (Independent) 0.8%
Illinois 4	John W. Rainey	Democratic	1918	Incumbent re-elected.	▌ ✓ John W. Rainey (Democratic) 48.9%; ▌John Golombiewski (Republican) 45.3%; ▌Charles Beranek (Socialist) 5.8%
Illinois 5	Adolph J. Sabath	Democratic	1906	Incumbent re-elected.	▌ ✓ Adolph J. Sabath (Democratic) 45.3%; ▌Jacob Gartenstein (Republican) 44.3%; ▌William Neumann (Socialist) 10.4%
Illinois 6	James McAndrews	Democratic	1912	Incumbent lost re-election. Republican gain.	▌ ✓ John J. Gorman (Republican) 63.8%; ▌James McAndrews (Democratic) 29.1%; ▌William F. Kruse (Socialist) 7.1%
Illinois 7	Niels Juul	Republican	1916	Incumbent lost renomination. Republican hold.	▌ ✓ M. Alfred Michaelson (Republican) 70.0%; ▌William J. Cullerton (Democratic) 21.6%; ▌Samuel Holland (Socialist) 7.6%; ▌Robert M. Buck (Independent) 0.7%
Illinois 8	Thomas Gallagher	Democratic	1908	Incumbent lost renomination. Democratic hold.	▌ ✓ Stanley H. Kunz (Democratic) 49.2%; ▌Dan Parrillo (Republican) 46.6%; ▌Henry C. Stockbridge (Socialist) 4.2%
Illinois 9	Frederick A. Britten	Republican	1912	Incumbent re-elected.	▌ ✓ Frederick A. Britten (Republican) 72.5%; ▌Eugene L. McGarry (Democratic) 23.7%; ▌Evar Anderson (Socialist) 3.9%
Illinois 10	Carl R. Chindblom	Republican	1918	Incumbent re-elected.	▌ ✓ Carl R. Chindblom (Republican) 74.4%; ▌John Haderlin (Democratic) 22.7%; ▌Charles Lorch (Socialist) 2.9%
Illinois 11	Ira C. Copley	Republican	1910	Incumbent re-elected.	▌ ✓ Ira C. Copley (Republican) 80.4%; ▌Anton Nemanich Jr. (Democratic) 17.4%; ▌Frank L. Raymond (Socialist) 2.1%
Illinois 12	Charles Eugene Fuller	Republican	1914	Incumbent re-elected.	▌ ✓ Charles Eugene Fuller (Republican) 95.8%; ▌Charles F. Johnson (Socialist) 4.2%
Illinois 13	John C. McKenzie	Republican	1910	Incumbent re-elected.	▌ ✓ John C. McKenzie (Republican) 80.5%; ▌J. L. Dickson (Democratic) 18.0%; ▌George W. Wright (Socialist) 1.5%
Illinois 14	William J. Graham	Republican	1916	Incumbent re-elected.	▌ ✓ William J. Graham (Republican) 67.1%; ▌Andrew Olson (Democratic) 29.7%; ▌Fred O. Hartline (Socialist) 3.2%
Illinois 15	Edward John King	Republican	1914	Incumbent re-elected.	▌ ✓ Edward John King (Republican) 69.0%; ▌William F. Gilroy (Democratic) 28.7%; ▌Carl W. Nass (Socialist) 2.3%
Illinois 16	Clifford Ireland	Republican	1916	Incumbent re-elected.	▌ ✓ Clifford Ireland (Republican) 67.3%; ▌Jefferson E. Houston (Democratic) 30.1%; ▌Ray Vollmer (Socialist) 2.3%; ▌S. J. French (Socialist Labor) 0.2%
Illinois 17	Frank L. Smith	Republican	1918	Incumbent retired to run for U.S. senator. Republican hold.	▌ ✓ Frank H. Funk (Republican) 70.5%; ▌Frank Gillespie (Democratic) 29.5%
Illinois 18	Joseph G. Cannon	Republican	1914	Incumbent re-elected.	▌ ✓ Joseph G. Cannon (Republican) 64.1%; ▌Armand E. Smith (Democratic) 32.5%; ▌P. N. Christensen (Farmer–Labor) 2.6%; ▌Bert Balloh (Socialist) 0.8%
Illinois 19	William B. McKinley	Republican	1914	Incumbent retired to run for U.S. senator. Republican hold.	▌ ✓ Allen F. Moore (Republican) 63.7%; ▌E. F. Poorman (Democratic) 35.5%; ▌John R. Heffner (Socialist) 0.8%
Illinois 20	Henry T. Rainey	Democratic	1902	Incumbent lost re-election. Republican gain.	▌ ✓ Guy L. Shaw (Republican) 53.1%; ▌Henry T. Rainey (Democratic) 46.9%
Illinois 21	Loren E. Wheeler	Republican	1914	Incumbent re-elected.	▌ ✓ Loren E. Wheeler (Republican) 52.0%; ▌J. Earl Major (Democratic) 34.9%; ▌Duncan McDonald (Farmer–Labor) 10.8%; ▌Fred W. Wenschoff (Socialist) 2.3%
Illinois 22	William A. Rodenberg	Republican	1914	Incumbent re-elected.	▌ ✓ William A. Rodenberg (Republican) 54.8%; ▌Guy R. McCasland (Democratic) 29.5%; ▌C. J. Hayes (Farmer–Labor) 13.1%; ▌Joseph H. Maisch (Socialist) 2.6%
Illinois 23	Edwin B. Brooks	Republican	1918	Incumbent re-elected.	▌ ✓ Edwin B. Brooks (Republican) 54.4%; ▌A. H. Gravenhorst (Democratic) 42.1%; ▌Melvin Brooks (Farmer–Labor) 2.5%; ▌Fred A. Cawley (Socialist) 1.0%
Illinois 24	Thomas Sutler Williams	Republican	1914	Incumbent re-elected.	▌ ✓ Thomas Sutler Williams (Republican) 60.9%; ▌Asher R. Cox (Democratic) 34.9%; ▌J. W. Bobinet (Farmer–Labor) 4.2%
Illinois 25	Edward E. Denison	Republican	1914	Incumbent re-elected.	▌ ✓ Edward E. Denison (Republican) 58.2%; ▌J. Herman Clayton (Democratic) 33.7%; ▌John H. Reed (Farmer–Labor) 6.7%; ▌Daniel Weldy (Socialist) 1.4%
Illinois at-large	Richard Yates Jr.	Republican	1918	Incumbent re-elected.	▌ ✓ Richard Yates Jr. (Republican) 33.1%; ▌ ✓ William E. Mason (Republican) 32.8%; ▌William Murphy (Democratic) 14.0%; ▌C. S. Schneider (Democratic) 13.7%; Others: ▌Frank Hall (Socialist) 1.6%; ▌John Hubert (Socialist) 1.6%; ▌Gifford Ernest (Farmer–Labor) 1.2%; ▌Robert Weber (Farmer–Labor) 1.2%; ▌Margaret Wintringer (Prohibition) 0.5%; ▌W. W. Jones (Prohibition) 0.2%; ▌Henry Schilling (Socialist Labor) 0.1%; ▌F. K. Kuchenbecker (Socialist Labor) 0.1%; ▌Henry Neil (Independent) 0.0%
Illinois at-large	William E. Mason	Republican	1916	Incumbent re-elected.	▌ ✓ Richard Yates Jr. (Republican) 33.1%; ▌ ✓ William E. Mason (Republican) 32.8%; ▌William Murphy (Democratic) 14.0%; ▌C. S. Schneider (Democratic) 13.7%; Others: ▌Frank Hall (Socialist) 1.6%; ▌John Hubert (Socialist) 1.6%; ▌Gifford Ernest (Farmer–Labor) 1.2%; ▌Robert Weber (Farmer–Labor) 1.2%; ▌Margaret Wintringer (Prohibition) 0.5%; ▌W. W. Jones (Prohibition) 0.2%; ▌Henry Schilling (Socialist Labor) 0.1%; ▌F. K. Kuchenbecker (Socialist Labor) 0.1%; ▌Henry Neil (Independent) 0.0%

== Indiana ==
District	Incumbent			This race	
District	Member	Party	First elected	Results	Candidates
Indiana 1	Oscar R. Luhring	Republican	1918	Incumbent re-elected.	▌ ✓ Oscar R. Luhring (Republican) 54.8%; ▌William E. Wilson (Democratic) 45.2%
Indiana 2	Oscar E. Bland	Republican	1916	Incumbent re-elected.	▌ ✓ Oscar E. Bland (Republican) 54.9%; ▌William A. Cullop (Democratic) 45.1%
Indiana 3	James W. Dunbar	Republican	1918	Incumbent re-elected.	▌ ✓ James W. Dunbar (Republican) 50.7%; ▌John W. Ewing (Democratic) 49.3%
Indiana 4	John S. Benham	Republican	1918	Incumbent re-elected.	▌ ✓ John S. Benham (Republican) 53.0%; ▌Harry C. Canfield (Democratic) 47.0%
Indiana 5	Everett Sanders	Republican	1916	Incumbent re-elected.	▌ ✓ Everett Sanders (Republican) 56.1%; ▌Charles F. Batt (Democratic) 43.9%
Indiana 6	Richard N. Elliott	Republican	1918	Incumbent re-elected.	▌ ✓ Richard N. Elliott (Republican) 55.7%; ▌William A. Yarling (Democratic) 44.3%
Indiana 7	Merrill Moores	Republican	1914	Incumbent re-elected.	▌ ✓ Merrill Moores (Republican) 56.3%; ▌Henry N. Spaan (Democratic) 43.7%
Indiana 8	Albert H. Vestal	Republican	1916	Incumbent re-elected.	▌ ✓ Albert H. Vestal (Republican) 58.4%; ▌Charles A. Paddock (Democratic) 41.6%
Indiana 9	Fred S. Purnell	Republican	1916	Incumbent re-elected.	▌ ✓ Fred S. Purnell (Republican) 56.9%; ▌Ben M. Scifres (Democratic) 43.1%
Indiana 10	William R. Wood	Republican	1914	Incumbent re-elected.	▌ ✓ William R. Wood (Republican) 70.5%; ▌Fred Barnett (Democratic) 29.5%
Indiana 11	Milton Kraus	Republican	1916	Incumbent re-elected.	▌ ✓ Milton Kraus (Republican) 56.0%; ▌Samuel E. Cook (Democratic) 44.0%
Indiana 12	Louis W. Fairfield	Republican	1916	Incumbent re-elected.	▌ ✓ Louis W. Fairfield (Republican) 61.5%; ▌Joseph R. Harrison (Democratic) 38.5%
Indiana 13	Andrew J. Hickey	Republican	1918	Incumbent re-elected.	▌ ✓ Andrew J. Hickey (Republican) 61.3%; ▌George Y. Hepler (Democratic) 38.7%

== Iowa ==
District	Incumbent			This race	
District	Member	Party	First elected	Results	Candidates
Iowa 1	Charles A. Kennedy	Republican	1906	Incumbent retired. Republican hold.	▌ ✓ William F. Kopp (Republican) 64.5%; ▌E. W. McManus (Democratic) 35.5%
Iowa 2	Harry E. Hull	Republican	1914	Incumbent re-elected.	▌ ✓ Harry E. Hull (Republican) 89.1%; ▌F. B. Althouse (Farmer–Labor) 10.8%; ▌H. J. Murphy (Independent) 0.2%
Iowa 3	Burton E. Sweet	Republican	1914	Incumbent re-elected.	▌ ✓ Burton E. Sweet (Republican) 97.2%; ▌Roy Jacobs (Farmer–Labor) 2.8%
Iowa 4	Gilbert N. Haugen	Republican	1898	Incumbent re-elected.	▌ ✓ Gilbert N. Haugen (Republican) 74.6%; ▌Carl Evans (Democratic) 25.4%
Iowa 5	James W. Good	Republican	1908	Incumbent re-elected.	▌ ✓ James W. Good (Republican); Uncontested
Iowa 6	C. William Ramseyer	Republican	1914	Incumbent re-elected.	▌ ✓ C. William Ramseyer (Republican) 65.9%; ▌O. P. Myers (Democratic) 34.1%
Iowa 7	Cassius C. Dowell	Republican	1914	Incumbent re-elected.	▌ ✓ Cassius C. Dowell (Republican) 98.1%; ▌Charles Gay (Socialist) 1.9%
Iowa 8	Horace M. Towner	Republican	1910	Incumbent re-elected.	▌ ✓ Horace M. Towner (Republican) 99.6%; ▌J. W. Killion (Independent) 0.4%
Iowa 9	William R. Green	Republican	1910	Incumbent re-elected.	▌ ✓ William R. Green (Republican) 82.1%; ▌Hattie T. Harl (Independent) 17.9%
Iowa 10	L. J. Dickinson	Republican	1918	Incumbent re-elected.	▌ ✓ L. J. Dickinson (Republican) 96.0%; ▌H. R. Reasoner (Farmer–Labor) 4.0%
Iowa 11	William D. Boies	Republican	1918	Incumbent re-elected.	▌ ✓ William D. Boies (Republican) 69.7%; ▌E. H. Birmingham (Democratic) 30.3%

== Kansas ==
District	Incumbent			This race	
District	Member	Party	First elected	Results	Candidates
Kansas 1	Daniel R. Anthony Jr.	Republican	1907 (special)	Incumbent re-elected.	▌ ✓ Daniel R. Anthony Jr. (Republican) 67.2%; ▌J. B. Billard (Democratic) 32.8%
Kansas 2	Edward C. Little	Republican	1916	Incumbent re-elected.	▌ ✓ Edward C. Little (Republican) 58.9%; ▌C. A. Bowman (Democratic) 38.9%; ▌A. W. Webster (Socialist) 2.2%
Kansas 3	Philip P. Campbell	Republican	1902	Incumbent re-elected.	▌ ✓ Philip P. Campbell (Republican) 60.4%; ▌J. D. Turkington (Democratic) 39.6%
Kansas 4	Homer Hoch	Republican	1918	Incumbent re-elected.	▌ ✓ Homer Hoch (Republican) 67.0%; ▌Walter W. Austin (Democratic) 30.7%; ▌Carlos A. Stebbins (Socialist) 2.3%
Kansas 5	James G. Strong	Republican	1918	Incumbent re-elected.	▌ ✓ James G. Strong (Republican) 68.6%; ▌Thomas F. Johnson (Democratic) 28.7%; ▌Ernest W. Powell (Socialist) 2.7%
Kansas 6	Hays B. White	Republican	1918	Incumbent re-elected.	▌ ✓ Hays B. White (Republican) 61.9%; ▌J. C. Ruppenthal (Democratic) 35.0%; ▌M. L. Phillips (Socialist) 3.1%
Kansas 7	Jasper N. Tincher	Republican	1918	Incumbent re-elected.	▌ ✓ Jasper N. Tincher (Republican) 62.9%; ▌J. R. Beeching (Democratic) 34.2%; ▌Edward E. Colglazier (Socialist) 2.8%
Kansas 8	William Augustus Ayres	Democratic	1914	Incumbent lost re-election. Republican gain.	▌ ✓ Richard E. Bird (Republican) 49.4%; ▌William Augustus Ayres (Democratic) 49.1%; ▌Reed Crandall (Socialist) 1.5%

== Kentucky ==
District	Incumbent			This race	
District	Member	Party	First elected	Results	Candidates
Kentucky 1	Alben W. Barkley	Democratic	1912	Incumbent re-elected.	▌ ✓ Alben W. Barkley (Democratic) 64.3%; ▌Miller Hughes (Republican) 35.7%
Kentucky 2	David Hayes Kincheloe	Democratic	1914	Incumbent re-elected.	▌ ✓ David Hayes Kincheloe (Democratic) 55.8%; ▌Erskine B. Bassett (Republican) 44.2%
Kentucky 3	Robert Y. Thomas Jr.	Democratic	1908	Incumbent re-elected.	▌ ✓ Robert Y. Thomas Jr. (Democratic) 50.4%; ▌John H. Gilliam (Republican) 49.6%
Kentucky 4	Ben Johnson	Democratic	1906	Incumbent re-elected.	▌ ✓ Ben Johnson (Democratic) 52.5%; ▌John P. Haswell (Republican) 47.5%
Kentucky 5	Charles F. Ogden	Republican	1918	Incumbent re-elected.	▌ ✓ Charles F. Ogden (Republican) 53.7%; ▌James H. Richmond (Democratic) 43.8%; ▌James H. Ross (Farmer–Labor) 2.4%
Kentucky 6	Arthur B. Rouse	Democratic	1910	Incumbent re-elected.	▌ ✓ Arthur B. Rouse (Democratic) 53.7%; ▌Rodney G. Beyson (Republican) 35.2%; ▌Harry V. Dill (Independent) 11.1%
Kentucky 7	J. Campbell Cantrill	Democratic	1908	Incumbent re-elected.	▌ ✓ J. Campbell Cantrill (Democratic); Uncontested
Kentucky 8	King Swope	Republican	1919	Incumbent lost re-election. Democratic gain.	▌ ✓ Ralph Gilbert (Democratic) 52.0%; ▌King Swope (Republican) 48.0%
Kentucky 9	William J. Fields	Democratic	1910	Incumbent re-elected.	▌ ✓ William J. Fields (Democratic) 52.9%; ▌W. G. Blair (Republican) 47.1%
Kentucky 10	John W. Langley	Republican	1906	Incumbent re-elected.	▌ ✓ John W. Langley (Republican); Uncontested
Kentucky 11	John M. Robsion	Republican	1918	Incumbent re-elected.	▌ ✓ John M. Robsion (Republican) 75.4%; ▌J. E. Sampson (Democratic) 24.6%

== Louisiana ==
District	Incumbent			This race	
District	Member	Party	First elected	Results	Candidates
Louisiana 1	James O'Connor	Democratic	1918	Incumbent re-elected.	▌ ✓ James O'Connor (Democratic); Uncontested
Louisiana 2	H. Garland Dupré	Democratic	1908	Incumbent re-elected.	▌ ✓ H. Garland Dupré (Democratic); Uncontested
Louisiana 3	Whitmell P. Martin	Democratic	1914	Incumbent re-elected.	▌ ✓ Whitmell P. Martin (Democratic); Uncontested
Louisiana 4	John T. Watkins	Democratic	1904	Incumbent lost renomination. Democratic hold.	▌ ✓ John N. Sandlin (Democratic); Uncontested
Louisiana 5	Riley J. Wilson	Democratic	1914	Incumbent re-elected.	▌ ✓ Riley J. Wilson (Democratic); Uncontested
Louisiana 6	Jared Y. Sanders Sr.	Democratic	1916	Incumbent retired to run for U.S. senator. Democratic hold.	▌ ✓ George K. Favrot (Democratic); Uncontested
Louisiana 7	Ladislas Lazaro	Democratic	1912	Incumbent re-elected.	▌ ✓ Ladislas Lazaro (Democratic); Uncontested
Louisiana 8	James Benjamin Aswell	Democratic	1912	Incumbent re-elected.	▌ ✓ James Benjamin Aswell (Democratic); Uncontested

== Maine ==
District	Incumbent			This race	
District	Member	Party	First elected	Results	Candidates
Maine 1	Louis B. Goodall	Republican	1916	Incumbent retired. Republican hold.	▌ ✓ Carroll L. Beedy (Republican) 66.6%; ▌Frank H. Haskell (Democratic) 33.4%
Maine 2	Wallace H. White	Republican	1916	Incumbent re-elected.	▌ ✓ Wallace H. White (Republican) 62.5%; ▌Wallace N. Price (Democratic) 37.5%
Maine 3	John A. Peters	Republican	1913	Incumbent re-elected.	▌ ✓ John A. Peters (Republican) 66.7%; ▌Archie C. Towle (Democratic) 33.3%
Maine 4	Ira G. Hersey	Republican	1916	Incumbent re-elected.	▌ ✓ Ira G. Hersey (Republican) 72.3%; ▌Leon G. C. Brown (Democratic) 27.7%

== Maryland ==
District	Incumbent			This race	
District	Member	Party	First elected	Results	Candidates
Maryland 1	William N. Andrews	Republican	1918	Incumbent lost re-election. Democratic gain.	▌ ✓ T. Alan Goldsborough (Democratic) 52.5%; ▌William N. Andrews (Republican) 47.5%
Maryland 2	Carville Benson	Democratic	1918	Incumbent lost re-election. Republican gain.	▌ ✓ Albert Blakeney (Republican) 50.3%; ▌Carville Benson (Democratic) 41.3%; ▌Samuel C. Appleby (Independent) 6.9%; Others: ▌Clarence H. Taylor (Socialist) 1.0%; ▌Richard A. O'Brien (Labor) 0.5%
Maryland 3	Charles P. Coady	Democratic	1912	Incumbent lost re-election. Republican gain.	▌ ✓ John P. Hill (Republican) 49.4%; ▌Charles P. Coady (Democratic) 46.4%; ▌S. M. Neistadt (Socialist) 3.4%; ▌Nathan Kleinman (Labor) 0.8%
Maryland 4	J. Charles Linthicum	Democratic	1910	Incumbent re-elected.	▌ ✓ J. Charles Linthicum (Democratic) 42.4%; ▌William O. Atwood (Republican) 40.8%; ▌W. E. Knickman (Independent) 11.1%; ▌John G. Baker (Independent) 4.2%; Others: ▌C. F. Saunders (Socialist) 1.1%; ▌Ada Smith Lang (Labor) 0.4%
Maryland 5	Sydney Emanuel Mudd II	Republican	1914	Incumbent re-elected.	▌ ✓ Sydney Emanuel Mudd II (Republican) 58.9%; ▌Thomas S. Klinger (Democratic) 36.6%; Others: ▌John R. Riggles (Prog) 1.8%; ▌Hartley-Hellyer (Independent) 1.4%; ▌James L. Smiley (Socialist) 1.3%
Maryland 6	Frederick N. Zihlman	Republican	1916	Incumbent re-elected.	▌ ✓ Frederick N. Zihlman (Republican) 56.3%; ▌Frank W. Mish (Democratic) 40.8%; ▌Noah S. Twigg (Socialist) 2.9%

== Massachusetts ==
District	Incumbent			This race	
District	Member	Party	First elected	Results	Candidates
Massachusetts 1	Allen T. Treadway	Republican	1912	Incumbent re-elected.	▌ ✓ Allen T. Treadway (Republican) 61.5%; ▌Thomas F. Cassidy (Democratic) 38.5%
Massachusetts 2	Frederick H. Gillett	Republican	1892	Incumbent re-elected.	▌ ✓ Frederick H. Gillett (Republican) 99.9%
Massachusetts 3	Calvin Paige	Republican	1913	Incumbent re-elected.	▌ ✓ Calvin Paige (Republican) 71.4%; ▌Nixon Campbell Sr. (Democratic) 28.6%
Massachusetts 4	Samuel Winslow	Republican	1912	Incumbent re-elected.	▌ ✓ Samuel Winslow (Republican) 56.7%; ▌John F. McGrath (Democratic) 43.2%
Massachusetts 5	John Jacob Rogers	Republican	1912	Incumbent re-elected.	▌ ✓ John Jacob Rogers (Republican) 70.1%; ▌Jackson Palmer (Democratic) 29.9%
Massachusetts 6	Willfred W. Lufkin	Republican	1917	Incumbent re-elected.	▌ ✓ Willfred W. Lufkin (Republican) 75.3%; ▌John P. O'Connell (Democratic) 24.7%
Massachusetts 7	Michael F. Phelan	Democratic	1912	Incumbent lost re-election. Republican gain.	▌ ✓ Robert S. Maloney (Republican) 47.6%; ▌Michael F. Phelan (Democratic) 43.7%; ▌George F. Hogan (Prohibition) 8.7%
Massachusetts 8	Frederick W. Dallinger	Republican	1914	Incumbent re-elected.	▌ ✓ Frederick W. Dallinger (Republican) 72.9%; ▌Whitfield L. Tuck (Democratic) 17.1%; ▌John D. Lynch (Independent) 10.0%
Massachusetts 9	Alvan T. Fuller	Republican	1916	Incumbent retired to run for Lt. Governor. Republican hold.	▌ ✓ Charles L. Underhill (Republican) 71.1%; ▌Maurice F. Ahearn (Democratic) 28.9%
Massachusetts 10	Peter Francis Tague	Democratic	1914; 1919	Incumbent re-elected.	▌ ✓ Peter Francis Tague (Democratic) 50.9%; ▌James E. Maguire (Republican) 49.1%
Massachusetts 11	George H. Tinkham	Republican	1914	Incumbent re-elected.	▌ ✓ George H. Tinkham (Republican) 68.5%; ▌Alfred J. Moore (Democratic) 31.5%
Massachusetts 12	James A. Gallivan	Democratic	1914	Incumbent re-elected.	▌ ✓ James A. Gallivan (Democratic) 58.6%; ▌Harrison H. Atwood (Republican) 32.8%; ▌William H. O'Brien (Independent) 8.6%
Massachusetts 13	Robert Luce	Republican	1918	Incumbent re-elected.	▌ ✓ Robert Luce (Republican) 70.9%; ▌Charles F. McCarthy (Democratic) 29.1%
Massachusetts 14	Richard Olney II	Democratic	1914	Incumbent lost re-election. Republican gain.	▌ ✓ Louis A. Frothingham (Republican) 60.4%; ▌Richard Olney II (Democratic) 36.8%; ▌Zoel Thibadeau (Socialist) 2.8%
Massachusetts 15	William S. Greene	Republican	1898	Incumbent re-elected.	▌ ✓ William S. Greene (Republican) 60.1%; ▌Arthur J. B. Cartier (Democratic) 39.9%
Massachusetts 16	Joseph Walsh	Republican	1914	Incumbent re-elected.	▌ ✓ Joseph Walsh (Republican) 84.8%; ▌George Richards (Labor) 15.2%

== Michigan ==
District	Incumbent			This race	
District	Member	Party	First elected	Results	Candidates
Michigan 1	Frank E. Doremus	Democratic	1910	Incumbent retired. Republican gain.	▌ ✓ George P. Codd (Republican) 80.3%; ▌Frank Murphy (Democratic) 17.8%; ▌Robert L. Barnet (Independent) 1.9%
Michigan 2	Earl C. Michener	Republican	1918	Incumbent re-elected.	▌ ✓ Earl C. Michener (Republican) 70.9%; ▌William H. Moore (Democratic) 29.0%; ▌James W. Helme (Liberal) 0.1%
Michigan 3	John M. C. Smith	Republican	1910	Incumbent retired. Republican hold.	▌ ✓ William H. Frankhauser (Republican) 71.4%; ▌Gordon L. Stewart (Democratic) 27.6%; ▌Truxton Talbot (Farmer–Labor) 0.9%
Michigan 4	Edward L. Hamilton	Republican	1896	Incumbent retired. Republican hold.	▌ ✓ John C. Ketcham (Republican) 75.1%; ▌Roman I. Jarvis Sr. (Democratic) 23.9%; Others: ▌Vivian F. Zellar (Prohibition) 0.8%; ▌L. A. Bregger (Farmer–Labor) 0.2%
Michigan 5	Carl E. Mapes	Republican	1912	Incumbent re-elected.	▌ ✓ Carl E. Mapes (Republican) 75.0%; ▌Frank C. Jarvis (Democratic) 22.4%; Others: ▌Glenn H. Pangborn (Socialist) 1.5%; ▌W. H. Wenger (Farmer–Labor) 1.0%
Michigan 6	Patrick H. Kelley	Republican	1914	Incumbent re-elected.	▌ ✓ Patrick H. Kelley (Republican) 72.7%; ▌Frank L. Dodge (Democratic) 23.6%; ▌I. Paul Taylor (Socialist) 3.7%
Michigan 7	Louis C. Cramton	Republican	1912	Incumbent re-elected.	▌ ✓ Louis C. Cramton (Republican) 80.1%; ▌John Hooker (Democratic) 19.1%; ▌John Diebel (Socialist) 0.8%
Michigan 8	Joseph W. Fordney	Republican	1898	Incumbent re-elected.	▌ ✓ Joseph W. Fordney (Republican) 72.2%; ▌Austin M. Brown (Democratic) 27.6%; ▌Morris McNally (Liberal) 0.2%
Michigan 9	James C. McLaughlin	Republican	1906	Incumbent re-elected.	▌ ✓ James C. McLaughlin (Republican) 76.3%; ▌Michael B. Danaher (Democratic) 21.5%; ▌W. H. Henderson (Socialist) 2.1%; ▌William Coddington (Socialist Labor) 0.1%
Michigan 10	Gilbert A. Currie	Republican	1916	Incumbent lost renomination. Republican hold.	▌ ✓ Roy O. Woodruff (Republican) 75.5%; ▌David J. Lynch (Democratic) 24.1%; ▌William W. Muir (Farmer–Labor) 0.5%
Michigan 11	Frank D. Scott	Republican	1914	Incumbent re-elected.	▌ ✓ Frank D. Scott (Republican); Uncontested
Michigan 12	W. Frank James	Republican	1914	Incumbent re-elected.	▌ ✓ W. Frank James (Republican) 80.4%; ▌Edward C. Anthony (Democratic) 16.2%; ▌Olga S. von Zellen (Liberal) 3.4%
Michigan 13	Charles Archibald Nichols	Republican	1914	Incumbent died in office. Republican hold.	▌ ✓ Vincent M. Brennan (Republican) 68.1%; ▌Jason H. Lee (Democratic) 27.3%; ▌Lazarus S. Davidow (Socialist) 2.9%; ▌W. E. Barton (Farmer–Labor) 1.7%

== Minnesota ==
District	Incumbent			This race	
District	Member	Party	First elected	Results	Candidates
Minnesota 1	Sydney Anderson	Republican	1910	Incumbent re-elected.	▌ ✓ Sydney Anderson (Republican) 70.4%; ▌Julius J. Reiter (Farmer–Labor) 29.6%
Minnesota 2	Franklin Ellsworth	Republican	1914	Incumbent retired to run for Governor of Michigan. Republican hold.	▌ ✓ Frank Clague (Republican) 65.2%; ▌Henry A. Fuller (Independent) 25.6%; ▌Frank Simon (Democratic) 9.2%
Minnesota 3	Charles Russell Davis	Republican	1902	Incumbent re-elected.	▌ ✓ Charles Russell Davis (Republican) 58.8%; ▌James M. Millett (Democratic) 21.4%; ▌Reinhart A. Pomadt (Independent) 19.8%
Minnesota 4	Oscar Keller	Republican	1918	Incumbent re-elected.	▌ ✓ Oscar Keller (Republican) 58.7%; ▌Thomas J. Brady (Democratic) 34.2%; ▌Carl W. Cummins (Republican) 7.1%
Minnesota 5	Walter Newton	Republican	1918	Incumbent re-elected.	▌ ✓ Walter Newton (Republican) 57.6%; ▌Lynn Thompson (Farmer–Labor) 23.7%; ▌Ernest Lundeen (Independent) 10.0%; ▌Theodore O. Dahl (Democratic) 8.8%
Minnesota 6	Harold Knutson	Republican	1916	Incumbent re-elected.	▌ ✓ Harold Knutson (Republican) 69.0%; ▌Charles A. Lindbergh (Independent) 31.0%
Minnesota 7	Andrew Volstead	Republican	1902	Incumbent re-elected.	▌ ✓ Andrew Volstead (Republican) 47.5%; ▌Ole J. Kvale (Independent) 45.6%; ▌James C. Mitchell (Democratic) 6.9%
Minnesota 8	William L. Carss	Farmer–Labor	1918	Incumbent lost re-election as a Democrat. Republican gain.	▌ ✓ Oscar Larson (Republican) 50.8%; ▌William L. Carss (Democratic) 49.2%
Minnesota 9	Halvor Steenerson	Republican	1902	Incumbent re-elected.	▌ ✓ Halvor Steenerson (Republican) 52.6%; ▌Nels E. Thormodson (Independent) 38.3%; ▌Frank Jeffers (Democratic) 9.1%
Minnesota 10	Thomas D. Schall	Republican	1914	Incumbent re-elected.	▌ ✓ Thomas D. Schall (Republican) 68.3%; ▌John G. Soltis (Farmer–Labor) 23.1%; ▌Henry A. Finlayson (Democratic) 8.6%

== Mississippi ==
District	Incumbent			This race	
District	Member	Party	First elected	Results	Candidates
Mississippi 1	Ezekiel S. Candler Jr.	Democratic	1900	Incumbent lost renomination. Democratic hold.	▌ ✓ John E. Rankin (Democratic) 95.6%; ▌Gaston Therrell (Republican) 4.4%
Mississippi 2	Hubert D. Stephens	Democratic	1910	Incumbent retired. Democratic hold.	▌ ✓ Bill G. Lowrey (Democratic); Uncontested
Mississippi 3	Benjamin G. Humphreys II	Democratic	1902	Incumbent re-elected.	▌ ✓ Benjamin G. Humphreys II (Democratic); Uncontested
Mississippi 4	Thomas U. Sisson	Democratic	1908	Incumbent re-elected.	▌ ✓ Thomas U. Sisson (Democratic) 93.8%; ▌J. A. Washington (Socialist) 6.2%
Mississippi 5	William W. Venable	Democratic	1916	Incumbent lost renomination. Democratic hold.	▌ ✓ Ross A. Collins (Democratic) 94.0%; ▌T. C. Brown (Republican) 3.7%; ▌C. C. Evans (Socialist) 2.2%
Mississippi 6	Paul B. Johnson Sr.	Democratic	1918	Incumbent re-elected.	▌ ✓ Paul B. Johnson Sr. (Democratic) 86.5%; ▌L. B. Collins (Republican) 8.1%; ▌T. J. Lyon (Socialist) 5.4%
Mississippi 7	Percy Quin	Democratic	1912	Incumbent re-elected.	▌ ✓ Percy Quin (Democratic) 92.7%; ▌S. S. Matthews (Republican) 4.3%; ▌J. B. Sternberger (Socialist) 3.0%
Mississippi 8	James W. Collier	Democratic	1908	Incumbent re-elected.	▌ ✓ James W. Collier (Democratic) 95.4%; ▌E. F. Miller (Socialist) 4.6%

== Missouri ==
District	Incumbent			This race	
District	Member	Party	First elected	Results	Candidates
Missouri 1	Milton A. Romjue	Democratic	1916	Incumbent lost re-election. Republican gain.	▌ ✓ Frank C. Millspaugh (Republican) 50.5%; ▌Milton A. Romjue (Democratic) 48.6%; ▌Clarence Snyder (Socialist) 0.9%
Missouri 2	William W. Rucker	Democratic	1898	Incumbent re-elected.	▌ ✓ William W. Rucker (Democratic) 52.7%; ▌B. F. Beazell (Republican) 47.1%; ▌E. R. Anderson (Socialist) 0.2%
Missouri 3	Jacob L. Milligan	Democratic	1918	Incumbent lost re-election. Republican gain.	▌ ✓ Henry F. Lawrence (Republican) 51.9%; ▌Jacob L. Milligan (Democratic) 48.1%
Missouri 4	Charles F. Booher	Democratic	1906	Incumbent retired. Republican gain.	▌ ✓ Charles L. Faust (Republican) 54.1%; ▌L. C. Gabbert (Democratic) 45.7%; ▌E. M. Wormley (Socialist) 0.2%
Missouri 5	William Thomas Bland	Democratic	1918	Incumbent lost re-election. Republican gain.	▌ ✓ Edgar C. Ellis (Republican) 50.1%; ▌William Thomas Bland (Democratic) 49.3%; ▌E. D. Hodges (Socialist) 0.3%
Missouri 6	Clement C. Dickinson	Democratic	1910	Incumbent lost re-election. Republican gain.	▌ ✓ William O. Atkeson (Republican) 52.2%; ▌Clement C. Dickinson (Democratic) 47.3%; ▌Oscar S. Myers (Socialist) 0.5%
Missouri 7	Samuel C. Major	Democratic	1918	Incumbent lost re-election. Republican gain.	▌ ✓ Roscoe C. Patterson (Republican) 54.9%; ▌Samuel C. Major (Democratic) 44.3%; ▌J. R. Richardson (Socialist) 0.9%
Missouri 8	William L. Nelson	Democratic	1918	Incumbent lost re-election. Republican gain.	▌ ✓ Sidney C. Roach (Republican) 53.8%; ▌William L. Nelson (Democratic) 45.9%; ▌E. B. Kenney (Socialist) 0.3%
Missouri 9	Champ Clark	Democratic	1896	Incumbent lost re-election. Republican gain.	▌ ✓ Theodore W. Hukriede (Republican) 52.2%; ▌Champ Clark (Democratic) 47.4%; ▌Ed A. Eno (Socialist) 0.3%
Missouri 10	Cleveland A. Newton	Republican	1918	Incumbent re-elected.	▌ ✓ Cleveland A. Newton (Republican) 61.2%; ▌A. Evan Hughes (Democratic) 32.8%; ▌W. M. Brandt (Socialist) 4.2%; Others: ▌J. Larken (Independent) 1.1%; ▌George Moser (Socialist Labor) 0.3%
Missouri 11	William L. Igoe	Democratic	1912	Incumbent retired. Democratic hold.	▌ ✓ Harry B. Hawes (Democratic) 49.8%; ▌Bernard P. Bogy (Republican) 46.8%; ▌Will C. Long (Socialist) 2.5%
Missouri 12	Leonidas C. Dyer	Republican	1914	Incumbent re-elected.	▌ ✓ Leonidas C. Dyer (Republican) 60.6%; ▌Samuel Rosenfeld (Democratic) 36.1%; Others: ▌Henry Siroky (Socialist) 1.5%; Others 1.8%
Missouri 13	Marion E. Rhodes	Republican	1918	Incumbent re-elected.	▌ ✓ Marion E. Rhodes (Republican) 55.2%; ▌A. T. Brewster (Democratic) 44.0%; ▌Robert Short (Socialist) 0.8%
Missouri 14	Edward D. Hays	Republican	1918	Incumbent re-elected.	▌ ✓ Edward D. Hays (Republican) 56.8%; ▌Robert L. Ward (Democratic) 41.8%; ▌John Gardner (Socialist) 1.4%
Missouri 15	Isaac V. McPherson	Republican	1918	Incumbent re-elected.	▌ ✓ Isaac V. McPherson (Republican) 55.7%; ▌E. M. Roseberry (Democratic) 42.7%; ▌W. H. McFall (Socialist) 1.6%
Missouri 16	Thomas L. Rubey	Democratic	1910	Incumbent lost re-election. Republican gain.	▌ ✓ Samuel A. Shelton (Republican) 54.5%; ▌Thomas L. Rubey (Democratic) 45.0%; ▌Henry M. Fouty (Socialist) 0.5%

== Montana ==
District	Incumbent			This race	
District	Member	Party	First elected	Results	Candidates
Montana 1	John M. Evans	Democratic	1912	Incumbent lost renomination. Republican gain.	▌ ✓ Washington J. McCormick (Republican) 57.2%; ▌Burton Watson (Democratic) 42.8%
Montana 2	Carl W. Riddick	Republican	1918	Incumbent re-elected.	▌ ✓ Carl W. Riddick (Republican) 64.9%; ▌M. McCusker (Democratic) 35.1%

== Nebraska ==
District	Incumbent			This race	
District	Member	Party	First elected	Results	Candidates
Nebraska 1	C. Frank Reavis	Republican	1914	Incumbent re-elected.	▌ ✓ C. Frank Reavis (Republican) 67.6%; ▌Frank A. Peterson (Democratic) 32.4%
Nebraska 2	Albert W. Jefferis	Republican	1918	Incumbent re-elected.	▌ ✓ Albert W. Jefferis (Republican) 64.4%; ▌James O'Hara (Democratic) 35.6%
Nebraska 3	Robert E. Evans	Republican	1918	Incumbent re-elected.	▌ ✓ Robert E. Evans (Republican) 54.0%; ▌Webb Rice (Democratic) 24.2%; ▌Marie Weekes (Independent) 21.8%
Nebraska 4	Melvin O. McLaughlin	Republican	1918	Incumbent re-elected.	▌ ✓ Melvin O. McLaughlin (Republican) 62.5%; ▌Albert P. Sprague (Democratic) 37.5%
Nebraska 5	William E. Andrews	Republican	1918	Incumbent re-elected.	▌ ✓ William E. Andrews (Republican) 58.3%; ▌Harry S. Dungan (Democratic) 41.7%
Nebraska 6	Moses Kinkaid	Republican	1902	Incumbent re-elected.	▌ ✓ Moses Kinkaid (Republican) 64.5%; ▌Thomas C. Grimes (Democratic) 27.3%; ▌Lucien Stebbins (Independent) 8.2%

== Nevada ==
District	Incumbent			This race	
District	Member	Party	First elected	Results	Candidates
Nevada at-large	Charles R. Evans	Democratic	1918	Incumbent lost re-election. Republican gain.	▌ ✓ Samuel S. Arentz (Republican) 48.9%; ▌Charles R. Evans (Democratic) 34.1%; ▌Paul Jones (Independent) 12.5%; ▌Jerry Donovan (Socialist) 4.5%

== New Hampshire ==
District	Incumbent			This race	
District	Member	Party	First elected	Results	Candidates
New Hampshire 1	Sherman Everett Burroughs	Republican	1916	Incumbent re-elected.	▌ ✓ Sherman Everett Burroughs (Republican) 59.3%; ▌Rosecrans W. Pillsbury (Democratic) 39.9%; ▌Solomon Shechet (Socialist) 0.7%
New Hampshire 2	Edward Hills Wason	Republican	1914	Incumbent re-elected.	▌ ✓ Edward Hills Wason (Republican) 61.4%; ▌Charles J. French (Democratic) 38.6%

== New Jersey ==
District	Incumbent			This race	
District	Member	Party	First elected	Results	Candidates
New Jersey 1	William J. Browning	Republican	1910	Incumbent died in office. Republican hold.	▌ ✓ Francis F. Patterson Jr. (Republican) 65.3%; ▌W. P. Kramer (Democratic) 27.7%; ▌Jennie S. Sharp (Prohibition) 4.1%; ▌H. F. Niessner (Socialist) 2.4%; ▌Arthur G. Hawes (Independent) 0.5%
New Jersey 2	Isaac Bacharach	Republican	1914	Incumbent re-elected.	▌ ✓ Isaac Bacharach (Republican) 70.0%; ▌William E. Jonah (Democratic) 29.5%; ▌George E. Strother (Socialist) 0.5%
New Jersey 3	Thomas J. Scully	Democratic	1910	Incumbent retired. Republican gain.	▌ ✓ T. Frank Appleby (Republican) 64.8%; ▌W. E. Ramsay (Democratic) 34.4%; ▌A. D. Albertson (Socialist) 0.8%
New Jersey 4	Elijah C. Hutchinson	Republican	1914	Incumbent re-elected.	▌ ✓ Elijah C. Hutchinson (Republican) 55.0%; ▌Charles Browne (Democratic) 44.0%; ▌Clarence P. Gibson (Socialist) 1.0%
New Jersey 5	Ernest R. Ackerman	Republican	1918	Incumbent re-elected.	▌ ✓ Ernest R. Ackerman (Republican) 68.8%; ▌R. E. Clement (Democratic) 28.1%; ▌James B. Furber (Socialist) 2.8%; ▌E. A. Smith (Prohibition) 0.2%
New Jersey 6	John R. Ramsey	Republican	1916	Incumbent lost renomination. Republican hold.	▌ ✓ Randolph Perkins (Republican) 66.4%; ▌Thomas A. Shields (Democratic) 31.5%; ▌Frederick Krafft (Socialist) 1.6%; Others: ▌Henry J. Cox (Prohibition) 0.3%; ▌Charles T. Logan (Independent) 0.1%
New Jersey 7	Amos H. Radcliffe	Republican	1918	Incumbent re-elected.	▌ ✓ Amos H. Radcliffe (Republican) 64.5%; ▌Nicholas Hughes (Democratic) 29.2%; ▌Frank Hubschmitt (Socialist) 5.6%; Others: ▌Edgar Whritenour (Prohibition) 0.4%; ▌Harry Santhouse (Socialist Labor) 0.3%
New Jersey 8	Cornelius A. McGlennon	Democratic	1918	Incumbent lost re-election. Republican gain.	▌ ✓ Herbert W. Taylor (Republican) 59.3%; ▌Cornelius A. McGlennon (Democratic) 39.4%; Others: ▌H. J. Howland (Socialist) 1.1%; ▌E. A. Pelz (Independent) 0.1%
New Jersey 9	Daniel F. Minahan	Democratic	1918	Incumbent lost re-election. Republican gain.	▌ ✓ Richard W. Parker (Republican) 59.3%; ▌Daniel F. Minahan (Democratic) 37.3%; ▌George H. Goebel (Socialist) 3.2%; ▌George L. Wolfson (Independent) 0.2%
New Jersey 10	Frederick R. Lehlbach	Republican	1914	Incumbent re-elected.	▌ ✓ Frederick R. Lehlbach (Republican) 63.6%; ▌Dallas Flanagan (Democratic) 30.4%; ▌William Freiday (Independent) 3.3%; ▌William L. Flavelle (Socialist) 2.2%; ▌Robert Sellick (Prohibition) 0.5%
New Jersey 11	John J. Eagan	Democratic	1912	Incumbent lost re-election. Republican gain.	▌ ✓ Archibald E. Olpp (Republican) 55.2%; ▌John J. Eagan (Democratic) 43.0%; Others: ▌I. George Koven (Socialist) 1.6%; ▌William J. Tighe (Independent) 0.3%
New Jersey 12	James A. Hamill	Democratic	1906	Incumbent retired. Democratic hold.	▌ ✓ Charles F. X. O'Brien (Democratic) 53.1%; ▌Walter Williams (Republican) 44.8%; Others: ▌F. J. V. Geronimo (Independent) 1.4%; ▌W. K. Tallman (Socialist) 0.7%

== New Mexico ==
District	Incumbent			This race	
District	Member	Party	First elected	Results	Candidates
New Mexico at-large	Benigno C. Hernández	Republican	1918	Incumbent retired. Republican hold.	▌ ✓ Néstor Montoya (Republican) 51.9%; ▌Antonio Lucero (Democratic) 46.9%; ▌A. J. McDonald (Socialist) 1.2%

== New York ==
District	Incumbent			This race	
District	Member	Party	First elected	Results	Candidates
New York 1	Frederick C. Hicks	Republican	1914	Incumbent re-elected.	▌ ✓ Frederick C. Hicks (Republican) 69.5%; ▌Alfred J. Kennedy (Democratic) 28.1%; ▌Daniel Hinckley (Socialist) 2.5%
New York 2	C. Pope Caldwell	Democratic	1914	Incumbent retired. Democratic hold.	▌ ✓ John J. Kindred (Democratic) 47.7%; ▌Rudolph Hantusch (Republican) 45.1%; ▌William Burke Sr. (Socialist) 6.6%; ▌W. E. Keyes (Prohibition) 0.7%
New York 3	John MacCrate	Republican	1918	Incumbent retired to run for Justice of the New York Supreme Court. Republican hold.	▌ ✓ John Kissel (Republican) 44.6%; ▌C. J. McWilliams (Democratic) 40.9%; ▌Harry W. Laidler (Socialist) 14.1%; ▌F. K. Oakley (Prohibition) 0.4%
New York 4	Thomas H. Cullen	Democratic	1918	Incumbent re-elected.	▌ ✓ Thomas H. Cullen (Democratic) 56.2%; ▌James J. Astoria (Republican) 39.2%; ▌Alexander Fagin (Socialist) 3.8%; ▌Max Schimpf (Prohibition) 0.9%
New York 5	John B. Johnston	Democratic	1918	Incumbent retired. Republican gain.	▌ ✓ Ardolph L. Kline (Republican) 58.2%; ▌Edward Cassin (Democratic) 38.2%; ▌Israel M. Chatcuff (Socialist) 2.8%; ▌William M. Nichol (Prohibition) 0.8%
New York 6	Frederick W. Rowe	Republican	1914	Incumbent retired. Republican hold.	▌ ✓ Warren I. Lee (Republican) 59.4%; ▌W. F. X. Geoghan (Democratic) 30.0%; ▌W. W. Passage (Socialist) 9.2%; ▌Lindsay Johnson (Prohibition) 1.5%
New York 7	James P. Maher	Democratic	1910	Incumbent lost re-election. Republican gain.	▌ ✓ Michael J. Hogan (Republican) 46.5%; ▌James P. Maher (Democratic) 37.6%; ▌Jean J. Coronel (Socialist) 14.9%; ▌C. E. Gildersleeve (Prohibition) 1.0%
New York 8	William E. Cleary	Democratic	1918	Incumbent lost re-election. Republican gain.	▌ ✓ Charles G. Bond (Republican) 49.1%; ▌William E. Cleary (Democratic) 35.8%; ▌Victor H. Lawn (Socialist) 14.5%; ▌A. J. Copeland (Prohibition) 0.6%
New York 9	David J. O'Connell	Democratic	1918	Incumbent lost re-election. Republican gain.	▌ ✓ Andrew Petersen (Republican) 52.1%; ▌David J. O'Connell (Democratic) 38.0%; ▌W. B. Robinson (Socialist) 9.3%; ▌F. C. Merchon (Prohibition) 0.5%
New York 10	Reuben L. Haskell	Republican	1914	Incumbent resigned. Republican hold.	▌ ✓ Lester D. Volk (Republican) 50.0%; ▌Gilbert H. Rhoades (Democratic) 27.3%; ▌James O'Neal (Socialist) 22.3%; ▌Bernard Cook (Prohibition) 0.4%
New York 11	Daniel J. Riordan	Democratic	1906	Incumbent re-elected.	▌ ✓ Daniel J. Riordan (Democratic) 50.7%; ▌Wilbur F. Wakeman (Republican) 46.1%; ▌Rudolph Rochow (Socialist) 3.3%
New York 12	Henry M. Goldfogle	Democratic	1918	Incumbent lost re-election. Socialist gain.	▌ ✓ Meyer London (Socialist) 54.1%; ▌Henry M. Goldfogle (Democratic) 45.9%
New York 13	Christopher D. Sullivan	Democratic	1916	Incumbent re-elected.	▌ ✓ Christopher D. Sullivan (Democratic) 64.6%; ▌Charles W. Ervin (Socialist) 35.4%
New York 14	Fiorello La Guardia	Republican	1916	Incumbent retired when elected New York City alderman. Republican hold.	▌ ✓ Nathan D. Perlman (Republican) 67.9%; ▌Algernon Lee (Socialist) 32.1%
New York 15	Peter J. Dooling	Democratic	1912	Incumbent lost re-election. Republican gain.	▌ ✓ Thomas J. Ryan (Republican) 51.6%; ▌Peter J. Dooling (Democratic) 40.8%; ▌James J. Reilly (Farmer–Labor) 4.3%; ▌Charles Richter (Socialist) 3.3%
New York 16	Thomas Francis Smith	Democratic	1917	Incumbent retired. Democratic hold.	▌ ✓ W. Bourke Cockran (Democratic) 53.0%; ▌Warren S. Fisher (Republican) 39.4%; ▌Bertha H. Mailly (Socialist) 7.6%
New York 17	Herbert Pell	Democratic	1918	Incumbent lost re-election. Republican gain.	▌ ✓ Ogden L. Mills (Republican) 62.0%; ▌Herbert Pell (Democratic) 33.8%; ▌Julius Halpern (Socialist) 4.3%
New York 18	John F. Carew	Democratic	1912	Incumbent re-elected.	▌ ✓ John F. Carew (Democratic) 31.2%; ▌Henry J. O'Connor (Republican) 28.6%; ▌J. A. O'Leary (Farmer–Labor) 25.6%; ▌Marie MacDonald (Socialist) 14.5%
New York 19	Joseph Rowan	Democratic	1918	Incumbent retired. Republican gain.	▌ ✓ Walter M. Chandler (Republican) 59.2%; ▌William Kennelly (Democratic) 32.7%; ▌Esther Friedman (Socialist) 8.0%
New York 20	Isaac Siegel	Republican	1914	Incumbent re-elected.	▌ ✓ Isaac Siegel (Republican) 57.2%; ▌Morris Hillquit (Socialist) 42.8%
New York 21	Jerome F. Donovan	Democratic	1918	Incumbent lost re-election. Republican gain.	▌ ✓ Martin C. Ansorge (Republican) 58.7%; ▌Jerome F. Donovan (Democratic) 34.2%; ▌Robert Press (Socialist) 4.6%; ▌T. F. Ryan (Farmer–Labor) 2.2%; ▌Morris Van Veen (Independent) 0.3%
New York 22	Anthony J. Griffin	Democratic	1918	Incumbent re-elected.	▌ ✓ Anthony J. Griffin (Democratic) 45.7%; ▌Wilbur J. Murphy (Republican) 39.6%; ▌Patrick J. Murphy (Socialist) 14.7%
New York 23	Richard F. McKiniry	Democratic	1918	Incumbent lost re-election. Republican gain.	▌ ✓ Albert B. Rossdale (Republican) 39.4%; ▌Richard F. McKiniry (Democratic) 37.3%; ▌Abraham Josephson (Socialist) 23.3%
New York 24	James V. Ganly	Democratic	1918	Incumbent lost re-election. Republican gain.	▌ ✓ Benjamin L. Fairchild (Republican) 53.6%; ▌James V. Ganly (Democratic) 29.8%; ▌George Orr (Socialist) 16.5%
New York 25	James W. Husted	Republican	1914	Incumbent re-elected.	▌ ✓ James W. Husted (Republican) 67.4%; ▌A. Outram Sherman (Democratic) 27.9%; ▌John Haggerty (Socialist) 4.7%
New York 26	Edmund Platt	Republican	1912	Incumbent resigned when appointed to Federal Reserve Board. Republican hold.	▌ ✓ Hamilton Fish Jr. (Republican) 63.7%; ▌Rosslyn M. Cox (Democratic) 33.0%; ▌James C. Hogan (Socialist) 3.3%
New York 27	Charles B. Ward	Republican	1914	Incumbent re-elected.	▌ ✓ Charles B. Ward (Republican) 60.8%; ▌John R. Green (Democratic) 33.1%; ▌Dorothy Frooks (Prohibition) 4.2%; ▌Dwight D. Wheden (Socialist) 1.8%
New York 28	Rollin B. Sanford	Republican	1914	Incumbent retired. Democratic gain.	▌ ✓ Peter G. Ten Eyck (Democratic) 53.8%; ▌Edward J. Halter (Republican) 44.4%; ▌James C. Sheehan (Socialist) 1.8%
New York 29	James S. Parker	Republican	1912	Incumbent re-elected.	▌ ✓ James S. Parker (Republican) 68.1%; ▌J. Ward Russell (Democratic) 29.6%; ▌D. V. Linehan (Socialist) 2.3%
New York 30	Frank Crowther	Republican	1918	Incumbent re-elected.	▌ ✓ Frank Crowther (Republican) 62.7%; ▌John E. Kelly (Democratic) 27.9%; ▌Harry Christian (Socialist) 9.3%
New York 31	Bertrand Snell	Republican	1915	Incumbent re-elected.	▌ ✓ Bertrand Snell (Republican) 74.7%; ▌John E. Russell (Democratic) 24.5%; ▌Harry Taylor (Socialist) 0.8%
New York 32	Luther W. Mott	Republican	1910	Incumbent re-elected.	▌ ✓ Luther W. Mott (Republican) 72.6%; ▌Newton S. Beebe (Democratic) 27.4%
New York 33	Homer P. Snyder	Republican	1914	Incumbent re-elected.	▌ ✓ Homer P. Snyder (Republican) 64.6%; ▌Roger W. Huntington (Democratic) 29.7%; ▌Harvey P. Brucker (Socialist) 3.9%; ▌Olin S. Bishop (Prohibition) 1.8%
New York 34	William H. Hill	Republican	1918	Incumbent retired. Republican hold.	▌ ✓ John D. Clarke (Republican) 69.8%; ▌Charles R. Seymour (Democratic) 28.4%; ▌Arthur Breckinridge (Socialist) 1.8%
New York 35	Walter W. Magee	Republican	1914	Incumbent re-elected.	▌ ✓ Walter W. Magee (Republican) 65.0%; ▌John F. Nash (Democratic) 27.8%; ▌Fred Sander (Socialist) 4.9%; ▌Fannie F. Cochran (Prohibition) 2.3%
New York 36	Norman J. Gould	Republican	1915	Incumbent re-elected.	▌ ✓ Norman J. Gould (Republican) 67.6%; ▌George K. Shuler (Democratic) 32.4%
New York 37	Alanson B. Houghton	Republican	1918	Incumbent re-elected.	▌ ✓ Alanson B. Houghton (Republican) 68.0%; ▌Charles R. Durham (Democratic) 28.7%; ▌Francis Toomey (Socialist) 3.2%
New York 38	Thomas B. Dunn	Republican	1912	Incumbent re-elected.	▌ ✓ Thomas B. Dunn (Republican) 66.0%; ▌Hiram R. Wood (Democratic) 23.6%; ▌Charles Messinger (Socialist) 9.7%; ▌H. C. Gregory (Farmer–Labor) 0.8%
New York 39	Archie D. Sanders	Republican	1916	Incumbent re-elected.	▌ ✓ Archie D. Sanders (Republican) 71.1%; ▌David A. White (Democratic) 23.6%; ▌George Weber (Socialist) 5.3%
New York 40	S. Wallace Dempsey	Republican	1914	Incumbent re-elected.	▌ ✓ S. Wallace Dempsey (Republican) 69.5%; ▌Frank S. Nicholson (Democratic) 23.8%; ▌Augustus Meas (Socialist) 6.7%
New York 41	Clarence MacGregor	Republican	1918	Incumbent re-elected.	▌ ✓ Clarence MacGregor (Republican) 54.5%; ▌Al J. Egloff (Democratic) 36.9%; ▌Martin B. Heisler (Socialist) 8.6%
New York 42	James M. Mead	Democratic	1918	Incumbent re-elected.	▌ ✓ James M. Mead (Democratic) 48.3%; ▌C. Hamilton Cook (Republican) 44.9%; ▌John H. Gibbons (Socialist) 6.8%
New York 43	Daniel A. Reed	Republican	1918	Incumbent re-elected.	▌ ✓ Daniel A. Reed (Republican) 74.4%; ▌Fred H. Sylvester (Democratic) 19.5%; ▌Gust B. Peterson (Socialist) 6.1%

== North Carolina ==
District	Incumbent			This race	
District	Member	Party	First elected	Results	Candidates
North Carolina 1	John Humphrey Small	Democratic	1898	Incumbent retired. Democratic hold.	▌ ✓ Hallett Sydney Ward (Democratic) 74.1%; ▌Wheeler Martin (Republican) 25.9%
North Carolina 2	Claude Kitchin	Democratic	1900	Incumbent re-elected.	▌ ✓ Claude Kitchin (Democratic) 86.1%; ▌W. O. Dixon (Republican) 13.9%
North Carolina 3	Samuel M. Brinson	Democratic	1918	Incumbent re-elected.	▌ ✓ Samuel M. Brinson (Democratic) 56.9%; ▌Richard L. Herring (Republican) 43.1%
North Carolina 4	Edward W. Pou	Democratic	1900	Incumbent re-elected.	▌ ✓ Edward W. Pou (Democratic) 65.3%; ▌James D. Parker (Republican) 34.7%
North Carolina 5	Charles Manly Stedman	Democratic	1910	Incumbent re-elected.	▌ ✓ Charles Manly Stedman (Democratic) 54.1%; ▌William D. Merritt (Republican) 45.9%
North Carolina 6	Hannibal L. Godwin	Democratic	1906	Incumbent lost renomination. Democratic hold.	▌ ✓ Homer L. Lyon (Democratic) 68.6%; ▌R. S. White (Republican) 31.4%
North Carolina 7	Leonidas D. Robinson	Democratic	1916	Incumbent retired. Democratic hold.	▌ ✓ William C. Hammer (Democratic) 53.1%; ▌William H. Cox (Republican) 46.9%
North Carolina 8	Robert L. Doughton	Democratic	1910	Incumbent re-elected.	▌ ✓ Robert L. Doughton (Democratic) 51.1%; ▌J. Ike Campbell (Republican) 48.9%
North Carolina 9	Clyde R. Hoey	Democratic	1919	Incumbent retired. Democratic hold.	▌ ✓ Alfred L. Bulwinkle (Democratic) 53.0%; ▌Jake F. Newell (Republican) 47.0%
North Carolina 10	Zebulon Weaver	Democratic	1916	Incumbent re-elected.	▌ ✓ Zebulon Weaver (Democratic) 51.6%; ▌L. L. Jenkins (Republican) 48.4%

== North Dakota ==
District	Incumbent			This race	
District	Member	Party	First elected	Results	Candidates
North Dakota 1	John M. Baer	Nonpartisan League	1916	Incumbent lost re-election. Republican gain.	▌ ✓ Olger B. Burtness (Republican) 57.6%; ▌John M. Baer (Nonpartisan League) 42.4%
North Dakota 2	George M. Young	Republican	1912	Incumbent re-elected.	▌ ✓ George M. Young (Republican) 51.7%; ▌Ole H. Olson (Nonpartisan League) 48.3%
North Dakota 3	James H. Sinclair	Republican	1918	Incumbent re-elected.	▌ ✓ James H. Sinclair (Republican) 62.9%; ▌R. A. Johnson (Democratic) 37.1%

== Ohio ==
District	Incumbent			This race	
District	Member	Party	First elected	Results	Candidates
Ohio 1	Nicholas Longworth	Republican	1914	Incumbent re-elected.	▌ ✓ Nicholas Longworth (Republican) 57.6%; ▌John H. Allen (Democratic) 40.4%; Others: ▌Eli G. Frankenstein (Independent) 1.1%; ▌Edward L. Hitchens (Republican) 0.9%
Ohio 2	Ambrose E. B. Stephens	Republican	1918	Incumbent re-elected.	▌ ✓ Ambrose E. B. Stephens (Republican) 52.6%; ▌Thomas H. Morrow (Democratic) 46.0%; ▌John Partridge (Independent) 1.4%
Ohio 3	Warren Gard	Democratic	1912	Incumbent retired. Republican gain.	▌ ✓ Roy G. Fitzgerald (Republican) 50.2%; ▌William G. Pickerel (Democratic) 44.9%; ▌Clarence M. Gauger (Independent) 4.9%
Ohio 4	Benjamin F. Welty	Democratic	1916	Incumbent lost re-election. Republican gain.	▌ ✓ John L. Cable (Republican) 52.6%; ▌Benjamin F. Welty (Democratic) 47.4%
Ohio 5	Charles J. Thompson	Republican	1918	Incumbent re-elected.	▌ ✓ Charles J. Thompson (Republican) 61.4%; ▌Newt Bronson (Democratic) 38.6%
Ohio 6	Charles C. Kearns	Republican	1914	Incumbent re-elected.	▌ ✓ Charles C. Kearns (Republican) 55.2%; ▌Cleona Searles (Democratic) 44.8%
Ohio 7	Simeon D. Fess	Republican	1914	Incumbent re-elected.	▌ ✓ Simeon D. Fess (Republican) 61.0%; ▌Paul F. Dye (Democratic) 39.0%
Ohio 8	R. Clint Cole	Republican	1918	Incumbent re-elected.	▌ ✓ R. Clint Cole (Republican) 54.2%; ▌Fred H. Guthery (Democratic) 45.8%
Ohio 9	Isaac R. Sherwood	Democratic	1906	Incumbent lost re-election. Republican gain.	▌ ✓ William W. Chalmers (Republican) 56.5%; ▌Isaac R. Sherwood (Democratic) 43.5%; ▌Karl E. Pauli (Independent) 0.1%
Ohio 10	Israel M. Foster	Republican	1918	Incumbent re-elected.	▌ ✓ Israel M. Foster (Republican) 64.2%; ▌Benjamin F. Reynolds (Democratic) 35.8%
Ohio 11	Edwin D. Ricketts	Republican	1918	Incumbent re-elected.	▌ ✓ Edwin D. Ricketts (Republican) 51.7%; ▌Mell G. Underwood (Democratic) 48.3%
Ohio 12	Clement Laird Brumbaugh	Democratic	1912	Incumbent retired. Republican gain.	▌ ✓ John C. Speaks (Republican) 57.9%; ▌Arthur P. Lamneck (Democratic) 40.8%; ▌Enoch B. Eubanks (Independent) 1.4%
Ohio 13	James T. Begg	Republican	1918	Incumbent re-elected.	▌ ✓ James T. Begg (Republican) 64.5%; ▌Alfred Waggoner (Democratic) 35.5%
Ohio 14	Martin L. Davey	Democratic	1918	Incumbent lost re-election. Republican gain.	▌ ✓ C. L. Knight (Republican) 52.2%; ▌Martin L. Davey (Democratic) 47.5%; ▌John C. Chase (Independent) 0.3%
Ohio 15	C. Ellis Moore	Republican	1918	Incumbent re-elected.	▌ ✓ C. Ellis Moore (Republican) 58.3%; ▌John S. Talbott (Democratic) 41.7%
Ohio 16	Roscoe C. McCulloch	Republican	1914	Incumbent retired to run for Governor of Ohio. Republican hold.	▌ ✓ Joseph H. Himes (Republican) 56.9%; ▌John McSweeney Jr. (Democratic) 43.1%
Ohio 17	William A. Ashbrook	Democratic	1906	Incumbent lost re-election. Republican gain.	▌ ✓ William M. Morgan (Republican) 50.2%; ▌William A. Ashbrook (Democratic) 49.8%
Ohio 18	B. Frank Murphy	Republican	1918	Incumbent re-elected.	▌ ✓ B. Frank Murphy (Republican) 61.7%; ▌Albert O. Barnes (Democratic) 38.3%
Ohio 19	John G. Cooper	Republican	1914	Incumbent re-elected.	▌ ✓ John G. Cooper (Republican) 70.4%; ▌James Kannedy (Democratic) 29.6%
Ohio 20	Charles A. Mooney	Democratic	1918	Incumbent lost re-election. Republican gain.	▌ ✓ Miner G. Norton (Republican) 56.0%; ▌Charles A. Mooney (Democratic) 42.9%; ▌Nicholas P. Geiger (Independent) 1.1%
Ohio 21	John J. Babka	Democratic	1918	Incumbent lost re-election. Republican gain.	▌ ✓ Harry C. Gahn (Republican) 59.1%; ▌John J. Babka (Democratic) 39.7%; ▌Henry Skinner (Independent) 1.2%
Ohio 22	Henry I. Emerson	Republican	1914	Incumbent lost renomination. Republican hold.	▌ ✓ Theodore E. Burton (Republican) 74.3%; ▌Matthew B. Excell (Democratic) 25.1%; ▌Max J. Sillins (Independent) 0.6%

== Oklahoma ==
District	Incumbent			This race	
District	Member	Party	First elected	Results	Candidates
Oklahoma 1	Everette B. Howard	Democratic	1918	Incumbent lost re-election. Republican gain.	▌ ✓ Thomas A. Chandler (Republican) 53.3%; ▌Everette B. Howard (Democratic) 43.8%; ▌Owsley Lonergan (Socialist) 2.9%
Oklahoma 2	William W. Hastings	Democratic	1914	Incumbent lost re-election. Republican gain.	▌ ✓ Alice Robertson (Republican) 48.8%; ▌William W. Hastings (Democratic) 48.4%; ▌John T. Cooper (Socialist) 2.8%
Oklahoma 3	Charles D. Carter	Democratic	1907 (new state)	Incumbent re-elected.	▌ ✓ Charles D. Carter (Democratic) 54.0%; ▌James L. Shinaberger (Republican) 39.2%; ▌Robert L. Allen (Socialist) 6.8%
Oklahoma 4	Tom D. McKeown	Democratic	1916	Incumbent lost re-election. Republican gain.	▌ ✓ Joseph C. Pringey (Republican) 48.6%; ▌Tom D. McKeown (Democratic) 46.1%; ▌J. E. Bartos (Socialist) 5.3%
Oklahoma 5	John W. Harreld	Republican	1919 (special)	Incumbent retired to run for U.S. senator. Democratic gain.	▌ ✓ Fletcher B. Swank (Democratic) 50.7%; ▌B. T. Hainer (Republican) 45.1%; ▌J. Luther Langston (Socialist) 4.2%
Oklahoma 6	Scott Ferris	Democratic	1907 (new state)	Incumbent retired to run for U.S. senator. Republican gain.	▌ ✓ L. M. Gensman (Republican) 47.8%; ▌Elmer Thomas (Democratic) 46.2%; ▌J. V. Kelachny (Socialist) 5.9%; ▌Alonzo Turner (Independent) 0.1%
Oklahoma 7	James V. McClintic	Democratic	1914	Incumbent re-elected.	▌ ✓ James V. McClintic (Democratic) 49.4%; ▌D. Montgomery (Republican) 40.8%; ▌O. E. Enfield (Socialist) 9.8%
Oklahoma 8	Dick Thompson Morgan	Republican	1908	Incumbent died in office. Republican hold.	▌ ✓ Manuel Herrick (Republican) 53.9%; ▌Zach A. Harris (Democratic) 40.4%; ▌H. C. Geist (Socialist) 5.7%

== Oregon ==
District	Incumbent			This race	
District	Member	Party	First elected	Results	Candidates
Oregon 1	Willis C. Hawley	Republican	1906	Incumbent re-elected.	▌ ✓ Willis C. Hawley (Republican) 90.2%; ▌Harlin Talbert (Socialist) 9.8%
Oregon 2	Nicholas J. Sinnott	Republican	1912	Incumbent re-elected.	▌ ✓ Nicholas J. Sinnott (Republican) 69.4%; ▌James H. Graham (Democratic) 30.6%
Oregon 3	Clifton N. McArthur	Republican	1914	Incumbent re-elected.	▌ ✓ Clifton N. McArthur (Republican) 51.9%; ▌Esther Pohl Lovejoy (Democratic) 43.6%; ▌F. T. Johns (Labor) 4.5%

== Pennsylvania ==
District	Incumbent			This race	
District	Member	Party	First elected	Results	Candidates
Pennsylvania 1	William S. Vare	Republican	1912	Incumbent re-elected.	▌ ✓ William S. Vare (Republican) 73.9%; ▌L. E. McCrossin (Democratic) 20.0%; ▌H. J. Nelson (Socialist) 6.0%
Pennsylvania 2	George S. Graham	Republican	1912	Incumbent re-elected.	▌ ✓ George S. Graham (Republican) 78.7%; ▌Herman Becker (Democratic) 17.8%; ▌Ed Maurer (Socialist) 3.5%
Pennsylvania 3	J. Hampton Moore	Republican	1906	Incumbent died in office. Republican hold.	▌ ✓ Harry C. Ransley (Republican) 77.0%; ▌Joseph Hagerty (Democratic) 18.5%; ▌Christian Sauer (Socialist) 4.5%
Pennsylvania 4	George W. Edmonds	Republican	1912	Incumbent re-elected.	▌ ✓ George W. Edmonds (Republican) 72.3%; ▌Harry J. Ruesscamp (Democratic) 21.1%; ▌L. L. Klein (Socialist) 5.2%; ▌William Hayes (Prohibition) 1.4%
Pennsylvania 5	Peter E. Costello	Republican	1914	Incumbent retired. Republican hold.	▌ ✓ James J. Connolly (Republican) 69.1%; ▌Henry J. Burns (Democratic) 22.4%; ▌Harry Bendel (Socialist) 4.7%; ▌Clayton L. Allen (Prohibition) 3.6%; ▌Henry Koetter (Single Tax) 0.1%
Pennsylvania 6	George P. Darrow	Republican	1914	Incumbent re-elected.	▌ ✓ George P. Darrow (Republican) 73.5%; ▌Harry S. Jeffery (Democratic) 23.5%; ▌J. N. Quick (Socialist) 2.9%
Pennsylvania 7	Thomas S. Butler	Republican	1896	Incumbent re-elected.	▌ ✓ Thomas S. Butler (Republican) 75.6%; ▌Freeland S. Brown (Democratic) 22.8%; ▌Walter N. Lodge (Socialist) 1.6%
Pennsylvania 8	Henry Winfield Watson	Republican	1914	Incumbent re-elected.	▌ ✓ Henry Winfield Watson (Republican) 67.5%; ▌Harvey S. Plummer (Democratic) 28.5%; ▌Irwin D. Endy (Socialist) 2.4%; ▌Theodore Koons (Prohibition) 1.6%
Pennsylvania 9	William W. Griest	Republican	1908	Incumbent re-elected.	▌ ✓ William W. Griest (Republican) 74.2%; ▌David F. Magee (Democratic) 24.1%; ▌W. W. Halligan (Socialist) 1.8%
Pennsylvania 10	Patrick McLane	Democratic	1918	Incumbent lost re-election. Republican gain.	▌ ✓ Charles R. Connell (Republican) 52.1%; ▌Patrick McLane (Democratic) 45.0%; ▌William Repp (Prohibition) 1.9%; ▌Bert R. Jones (Socialist) 1.0%
Pennsylvania 11	John J. Casey	Democratic	1918	Incumbent lost re-election. Republican gain.	▌ ✓ Clarence D. Coughlin (Republican) 59.7%; ▌John J. Casey (Democratic) 40.3%
Pennsylvania 12	John Reber	Republican	1918	Incumbent re-elected.	▌ ✓ John Reber (Republican) 55.2%; ▌Thomas J. Butler (Democratic) 44.8%
Pennsylvania 13	Arthur G. Dewalt	Democratic	1914	Incumbent retired. Republican gain.	▌ ✓ Fred B. Gernerd (Republican) 50.6%; ▌Harry J. Dunn (Democratic) 39.8%; ▌Charles E. Yeager (Socialist) 8.3%; ▌Harry G. Seltzer (Prohibition) 1.3%
Pennsylvania 14	Louis T. McFadden	Republican	1914	Incumbent re-elected.	▌ ✓ Louis T. McFadden (Republican) 76.0%; ▌Thomas A. Doherty (Democratic) 22.6%; ▌E. R. W. Searle (Socialist) 1.4%
Pennsylvania 15	Edgar R. Kiess	Republican	1912	Incumbent re-elected.	▌ ✓ Edgar R. Kiess (Republican) 71.6%; ▌C. Edmund Gilmore (Democratic) 25.6%; ▌W. J. Brotherton (Socialist) 2.8%
Pennsylvania 16	John V. Lesher	Democratic	1912	Incumbent lost re-election. Republican gain.	▌ ✓ I. Clinton Kline (Republican) 52.1%; ▌John V. Lesher (Democratic) 45.0%; ▌W. B. Kock (Socialist) 2.9%
Pennsylvania 17	Benjamin K. Focht	Republican	1914	Incumbent re-elected.	▌ ✓ Benjamin K. Focht (Republican) 62.6%; ▌John C. Dunkle (Democratic) 36.1%; ▌W. G. Bowers (Socialist) 1.2%
Pennsylvania 18	Aaron S. Kreider	Republican	1912	Incumbent re-elected.	▌ ✓ Aaron S. Kreider (Republican) 64.1%; ▌Milton H. Plank (Democratic) 28.4%; ▌George A. Herring (Labor) 6.2%; ▌George Steiner (Socialist) 1.3%
Pennsylvania 19	John M. Rose	Republican	1916	Incumbent re-elected.	▌ ✓ John M. Rose (Republican) 56.2%; ▌Warren Worth Bailey (Democratic) 28.8%; ▌William T. Welsh (Socialist Labor) 15.0%
Pennsylvania 20	Edward S. Brooks	Republican	1918	Incumbent re-elected.	▌ ✓ Edward S. Brooks (Republican) 51.7%; ▌Charles A. Hawkins (Democratic) 46.5%; ▌Harry Lagerman (Socialist) 1.7%
Pennsylvania 21	Evan J. Jones	Republican	1918	Incumbent re-elected.	▌ ✓ Evan J. Jones (Republican) 63.4%; ▌J. D. Connelly (Democratic) 34.2%; ▌George W. Fox (Socialist) 2.4%
Pennsylvania 22	John H. Wilson	Democratic	1918	Incumbent lost re-election. Republican gain.	▌ ✓ Adam Wyant (Republican) 51.6%; ▌John H. Wilson (Democratic) 38.1%; ▌S. E. Miller (Socialist) 5.5%; ▌S. W. Bierer (Prohibition) 4.9%
Pennsylvania 23	Samuel A. Kendall	Republican	1918	Incumbent re-elected.	▌ ✓ Samuel A. Kendall (Republican) 59.0%; ▌Bruce F. Sterling (Democratic) 38.3%; ▌Herman G. Lepley (Socialist) 2.7%
Pennsylvania 24	Henry W. Temple	Republican	1912	Incumbent re-elected.	▌ ✓ Henry W. Temple (Republican) 73.3%; ▌Samuel Amspoker (Democratic) 26.6%
Pennsylvania 25	Milton W. Shreve	Republican	1918	Incumbent lost renomination but re-elected as an Independent Republican. Independent Republican gain.	▌ ✓ Milton W. Shreve (Ind. Republican) 43.0%; ▌Robert J. Firman (Republican) 41.0%; ▌Max B. Haibach (Democratic) 11.9%; ▌Charles Emmert (Socialist) 4.0%
Pennsylvania 26	Henry J. Steele	Democratic	1914	Incumbent retired. Republican gain.	▌ ✓ William H. Kirkpatrick (Republican) 56.0%; ▌George W. Geiser Jr. (Democratic) 42.3%; ▌Wilson A. Brown (Socialist) 1.7%
Pennsylvania 27	Nathan L. Strong	Republican	1916	Incumbent re-elected.	▌ ✓ Nathan L. Strong (Republican) 71.4%; ▌Lafayette F. Sutter (Democratic) 24.7%; ▌Davis A. Palmer (Socialist) 2.4%; ▌Samuel Reese (Labor) 1.6%
Pennsylvania 28	Willis J. Hulings	Prohibition	1918	Incumbent lost re-election. Republican gain.	▌ ✓ Harris J. Bixler (Republican) 56.4%; ▌Willis J. Hulings (Prohibition) 40.6%; ▌Ervine F. Stoyer (Socialist) 3.0%
Pennsylvania 29	Stephen G. Porter	Republican	1910	Incumbent re-elected.	▌ ✓ Stephen G. Porter (Republican) 69.5%; ▌George J. Shaffer (Democratic) 22.8%; ▌James J. Marshall (Socialist) 7.6%
Pennsylvania 30	M. Clyde Kelly	Republican	1916	Incumbent re-elected.	▌ ✓ M. Clyde Kelly (Republican) 91.5%; ▌Charles A. Fike (Socialist) 8.5%
Pennsylvania 31	John M. Morin	Republican	1912	Incumbent re-elected.	▌ ✓ John M. Morin (Republican) 89.8%; ▌Albert R. Jerling (Socialist) 7.0%; ▌W. A. Stewart (Prohibition) 3.2%
Pennsylvania 32	Guy E. Campbell	Democratic	1916	Incumbent re-elected.	▌ ✓ Guy E. Campbell (Democratic) 80.1%; ▌Earl O. Gunther (Socialist) 10.6%; ▌George E.Briggs (Prohibition) 9.2%
Pennsylvania at-large	William J. Burke	Republican	1918	Incumbent re-elected.	▌ ✓ William J. Burke (Republican) 16.2%; ▌ ✓ Joseph McLaughlin (Republican) 15.9%; ▌ ✓ Anderson H. Walters (Republican) 16.3%; ▌ ✓ Mahlon M. Garland (Republican) 16.1%; ▌John P. Bracken (Democratic) 6.7%; ▌M. J. Hanlan (Democratic) 6.6%; ▌Charles M. Bowman (Democratic) 6.6%; ▌John B. McDonough (Democratic) 6.4%; Others: ▌Flora J. Diefenderfer (Prohibition) 1.3%; ▌George Hart (Prohibition) 1.2%; ▌Luther S. Kauffman (Prohibition) 1.2%; ▌Charles J. Bauer (Socialist) 1.0%; ▌A. M. Buckwalter (Socialist) 1.0%; ▌Edward W. Hayden (Socialist) 0.9%; ▌Henry W. Schlegel (Socialist) 0.9%; ▌F. E. Whittlesey (Prohibition) 0.9%; ▌Frieda S. Miller (Labor) 0.4%; ▌Howard Cessna (Labor) 0.3%; ▌William A. Hagan (Single Tax) 0.0%; ▌William R. Kline (Single Tax) 0.0%; ▌Thomas A. Kavanagh (Single Tax) 0.0%; ▌Joseph E. Robinson (Single Tax) 0.0%; ▌Joseph P. Smith (Independent) 0.0%; ▌Frank Kalcec (Independent) 0.0%; ▌Joseph Rack (Independent) 0.0%; ▌Herman Spittal (Independent) 0.0%
Pennsylvania at-large	Thomas S. Crago	Republican	1914	Incumbent retired. Republican hold.	
Pennsylvania at-large	Anderson H. Walters	Republican	1918	Incumbent re-elected.	
Pennsylvania at-large	Mahlon M. Garland	Republican	1914	Incumbent re-elected but died before start of next Congress.	

== Rhode Island ==
District	Incumbent			This race	
District	Member	Party	First elected	Results	Candidates
Rhode Island 1	Clark Burdick	Republican	1918	Incumbent re-elected.	▌ ✓ Clark Burdick (Republican) 67.9%; ▌Patrick J. Boyle (Democratic) 32.1%
Rhode Island 2	Walter R. Stiness	Republican	1914	Incumbent re-elected.	▌ ✓ Walter R. Stiness (Republican) 62.5%; ▌Luigi De Pasquale (Democratic) 35.1%; ▌Charles Hermann (Socialist) 2.1%; ▌B. J. Murray (Socialist Labor) 0.4%
Rhode Island 3	Ambrose Kennedy	Republican	1912	Incumbent re-elected.	▌ ✓ Ambrose Kennedy (Republican) 59.7%; ▌Herve J. Legace (Democratic) 38.4%; ▌W. A. Carpenter (Socialist) 1.9%

== South Carolina ==
District	Incumbent			This race	
District	Member	Party	First elected	Results	Candidates
South Carolina 1	Richard S. Whaley	Democratic	1913	Incumbent retired. Democratic hold.	▌ ✓ W. Turner Logan (Democratic) 92.6%; ▌FNU Saspartas (Independent) 7.4%
South Carolina 2	James F. Byrnes	Democratic	1910	Incumbent re-elected.	▌ ✓ James F. Byrnes (Democratic); Uncontested
South Carolina 3	Frederick H. Dominick	Democratic	1916	Incumbent re-elected.	▌ ✓ Frederick H. Dominick (Democratic); Uncontested
South Carolina 4	Samuel J. Nicholls	Democratic	1915	Incumbent retired. Democratic hold.	▌ ✓ John J. McSwain (Democratic); Uncontested
South Carolina 5	William F. Stevenson	Democratic	1917	Incumbent re-elected.	▌ ✓ William F. Stevenson (Democratic); Uncontested
South Carolina 6	Philip H. Stoll	Democratic	1919	Incumbent re-elected.	▌ ✓ Philip H. Stoll (Democratic); Uncontested
South Carolina 7	Edward C. Mann	Democratic	1919	Incumbent lost renomination. Democratic hold.	▌ ✓ Hampton P. Fulmer (Democratic) 91.9%; ▌FNU Hawkins (Independent) 8.1%

== South Dakota ==
District	Incumbent			This race	
District	Member	Party	First elected	Results	Candidates
South Dakota 1	Charles A. Christopherson	Republican	1918	Incumbent re-elected.	▌ ✓ Charles A. Christopherson (Republican) 56.2%; ▌Engebret J. Holter (Nonpartisan League) 22.6%; ▌Ralph E. Johnson (Democratic) 21.2%
South Dakota 2	Royal C. Johnson	Republican	1918	Incumbent re-elected.	▌ ✓ Royal C. Johnson (Republican) 62.3%; ▌Frank Whalen (Nonpartisan League) 25.5%; ▌Lewis W. Bicknell (Democratic) 12.2%
South Dakota 3	Harry L. Gandy	Democratic	1914	Incumbent lost re-election. Republican gain.	▌ ✓ William Williamson (Republican) 48.0%; ▌Harry Gandy (Democratic) 40.2%; ▌O. E. Farnam (Nonpartisan League) 11.8%

== Tennessee ==
District	Incumbent			This race	
District	Member	Party	First elected	Results	Candidates
Tennessee 1	Sam R. Sells	Republican	1910	Incumbent lost renomination. Republican hold.	▌ ✓ B. Carroll Reece (Republican) 98.3%; ▌J. N. Lotspeich (Socialist) 1.7%
Tennessee 2	J. Will Taylor	Republican	1918	Incumbent re-elected.	▌ ✓ J. Will Taylor (Republican) 74.8%; ▌Curtis Gentry (Democratic) 24.6%; ▌Lynn Hall (Socialist) 0.6%
Tennessee 3	John A. Moon	Democratic	1896	Incumbent lost re-election. Republican gain.	▌ ✓ Joe Brown (Republican) 51.6%; ▌John A. Moon (Democratic) 47.7%; ▌W. B. Heird (Socialist) 0.7%
Tennessee 4	Cordell Hull	Democratic	1906	Incumbent lost re-election. Republican gain.	▌ ✓ Wynne F. Clouse (Republican) 50.3%; ▌Cordell Hull (Democratic) 49.5%; ▌Hugo Gernt (Socialist) 0.2%
Tennessee 5	Ewin L. Davis	Democratic	1918	Incumbent re-elected.	▌ ✓ Ewin L. Davis (Democratic) 61.9%; ▌Jesse Davenport (Republican) 37.9%; ▌V. E. Proyter (Socialist) 0.2%
Tennessee 6	Jo Byrns	Democratic	1908	Incumbent re-elected.	▌ ✓ Jo Byrns (Democratic) 82.9%; ▌W. T. Perry (Republican) 15.9%; ▌William Frank (Socialist) 1.2%
Tennessee 7	Lemuel P. Padgett	Democratic	1900	Incumbent re-elected.	▌ ✓ Lemuel P. Padgett (Democratic) 55.7%; ▌A. M. Hughes (Republican) 43.9%; ▌[FNU] Porter (Socialist) 0.3%
Tennessee 8	Thetus W. Sims	Democratic	1896	Incumbent lost renomination. Republican gain.	▌ ✓ Lon A. Scott (Republican) 50.6%; ▌Gordon Browning (Democratic) 49.1%; ▌J. T. Melton (Socialist) 0.3%
Tennessee 9	Finis J. Garrett	Democratic	1904	Incumbent re-elected.	▌ ✓ Finis J. Garrett (Democratic) 68.3%; ▌John R. Walker (Republican) 31.4%; ▌W. S. Duggin (Socialist) 0.3%
Tennessee 10	Hubert Fisher	Democratic	1916	Incumbent re-elected.	▌ ✓ Hubert Fisher (Democratic) 80.5%; ▌Wayman Wilkerson (Republican) 16.9%; ▌G. J. Braun (Socialist) 2.6%

== Texas ==
District	Incumbent			This race	
District	Member	Party	First elected	Results	Candidates
Texas 1	Eugene Black	Democratic	1914	Incumbent re-elected.	▌ ✓ Eugene Black (Democratic) 92.2%; ▌G. T. Bartlett (Republican) 7.8%
Texas 2	John C. Box	Democratic	1918	Incumbent re-elected.	▌ ✓ John C. Box (Democratic) 92.8%; ▌G. E. H. Meyer (American) 7.2%
Texas 3	James Young	Democratic	1910	Incumbent retired. Democratic hold.	▌ ✓ Morgan G. Sanders (Democratic) 83.2%; ▌J. A. Butler (Republican) 16.8%
Texas 4	Sam Rayburn	Democratic	1912	Incumbent re-elected.	▌ ✓ Sam Rayburn (Democratic) 77.6%; ▌A. W. Acheson (Republican) 22.4%
Texas 5	Hatton W. Sumners	Democratic	1914	Incumbent re-elected.	▌ ✓ Hatton W. Sumners (Democratic) 80.2%; ▌J. O. Burleson (Republican) 19.8%
Texas 6	Rufus Hardy	Democratic	1906	Incumbent re-elected.	▌ ✓ Rufus Hardy (Democratic) 74.0%; ▌Clyde Essex (American) 15.5%; ▌D. H. Merrill (Republican) 10.6%
Texas 7	Clay Stone Briggs	Democratic	1918	Incumbent re-elected.	▌ ✓ Clay Stone Briggs (Democratic); Uncontested
Texas 8	Joe H. Eagle	Democratic	1912	Incumbent retired. Democratic hold.	▌ ✓ Daniel E. Garrett (Democratic) 55.7%; ▌E. B. Barden (Republican) 21.1%; ▌M. H. Broyles (Republican) 17.3%; ▌J. M. Gibson (American) 5.8%
Texas 9	Joseph J. Mansfield	Democratic	1916	Incumbent re-elected.	▌ ✓ Joseph J. Mansfield (Democratic) 58.7%; ▌J. W. Rugely (Republican) 41.3%
Texas 10	James P. Buchanan	Democratic	1912	Incumbent re-elected.	▌ ✓ James P. Buchanan (Democratic) 65.5%; ▌B. G. Neighbors (American) 34.5%
Texas 11	Tom Connally	Democratic	1916	Incumbent re-elected.	▌ ✓ Tom Connally (Democratic) 79.1%; ▌W. D. Lewis (American) 20.9%
Texas 12	Fritz G. Lanham	Democratic	1919	Incumbent re-elected.	▌ ✓ Fritz G. Lanham (Democratic) 80.5%; ▌Sam Davidson (Republican) 16.2%; ▌S. T. R. Green (Republican) 3.4%
Texas 13	Lucian W. Parrish	Democratic	1918	Incumbent re-elected.	▌ ✓ Lucian W. Parrish (Democratic) 88.4%; ▌C. W. Johnson (Republican) 11.6%
Texas 14	Carlos Bee	Democratic	1918	Incumbent lost re-election. Republican gain.	▌ ✓ Harry M. Wurzbach (Republican) 56.0%; ▌Carlos Bee (Democratic) 44.0%
Texas 15	John Nance Garner	Democratic	1902	Incumbent re-elected.	▌ ✓ John Nance Garner (Democratic); Uncontested
Texas 16	Claude B. Hudspeth	Democratic	1918	Incumbent re-elected.	▌ ✓ Claude B. Hudspeth (Democratic) 69.7%; ▌W. C. Easterling (Republican) 30.3%
Texas 17	Thomas L. Blanton	Democratic	1916	Incumbent re-elected.	▌ ✓ Thomas L. Blanton (Democratic) 83.8%; ▌W. D. Cowan (American) 16.2%
Texas 18	John Marvin Jones	Democratic	1916	Incumbent re-elected.	▌ ✓ John Marvin Jones (Democratic) 97.0%; ▌L. P. Loomis (Republican) 3.0%

== Utah ==
District	Incumbent			This race	
District	Member	Party	First elected	Results	Candidates
Utah 1	Milton H. Welling	Democratic	1916	Incumbent retired to run for U.S. senator. Republican gain.	▌ ✓ Don B. Colton (Republican) 57.5%; ▌James W. Funk (Democratic) 38.3%; ▌John O. Waters (Farmer–Labor) 4.2%
Utah 2	James Henry Mays	Democratic	1914	Incumbent retired. Republican gain.	▌ ✓ Elmer O. Leatherwood (Republican) 54.8%; ▌Mathonihah Thomas (Democratic) 39.4%; ▌Marvin P. Bales (Farmer–Labor) 3.4%; ▌C. T. Stoney (Socialist) 2.4%

== Vermont ==
District	Incumbent			This race	
District	Member	Party	First elected	Results	Candidates
Vermont 1	Frank L. Greene	Republican	1912 (special)	Incumbent re-elected.	▌ ✓ Frank L. Greene (Republican) 74.7%; ▌Jeremiah C. Durick (Democratic) 25.3%
Vermont 2	Porter H. Dale	Republican	1914	Incumbent re-elected.	▌ ✓ Porter H. Dale (Republican) 78.8%; ▌Harry W. Witters (Democratic) 21.2%

== Virginia ==
District	Incumbent			This race	
District	Member	Party	First elected	Results	Candidates
Virginia 1	S. Otis Bland	Democratic	1918	Incumbent re-elected.	▌ ✓ S. Otis Bland (Democratic) 80.4%; ▌S. P. Powell (Republican) 19.6%
Virginia 2	Edward E. Holland	Democratic	1910	Incumbent retired. Democratic hold.	▌ ✓ Joseph T. Deal (Democratic) 74.0%; ▌Menalcus Lankford (Republican) 26.0%
Virginia 3	Jack Montague	Democratic	1912	Incumbent re-elected.	▌ ✓ Jack Montague (Democratic) 99.2%; ▌H. Adolph Muller (Republican) 0.8%
Virginia 4	Patrick H. Drewry	Democratic	1920	Incumbent re-elected.	▌ ✓ Patrick H. Drewry (Democratic) 92.6%; ▌F. L. Mason (Republican) 7.4%
Virginia 5	Rorer A. James	Democratic	1920	Incumbent re-elected.	▌ ✓ Rorer A. James (Democratic) 58.4%; ▌S. Floyd Landreth (Republican) 41.6%
Virginia 6	James P. Woods	Democratic	1919 (special)	Incumbent re-elected.	▌ ✓ James P. Woods (Democratic) 59.0%; ▌W. M. Doak (Republican) 41.0%
Virginia 7	Thomas W. Harrison	Democratic	1916	Incumbent re-elected.	▌ ✓ Thomas W. Harrison (Democratic) 50.9%; ▌John Paul (Republican) 49.1%
Virginia 8	R. Walton Moore	Democratic	1919	Incumbent re-elected.	▌ ✓ R. Walton Moore (Democratic) 71.6%; ▌F. M. Brooks (Republican) 28.4%
Virginia 9	C. Bascom Slemp	Republican	1907	Incumbent re-elected.	▌ ✓ C. Bascom Slemp (Republican) 54.8%; ▌Bolling H. Handy (Democratic) 45.2%
Virginia 10	Henry D. Flood	Democratic	1900	Incumbent re-elected.	▌ ✓ Henry D. Flood (Democratic) 64.9%; ▌James H. C. Grasty (Republican) 35.1%

== Washington ==
District	Incumbent			This race	
District	Member	Party	First elected	Results	Candidates
Washington 1	John Franklin Miller	Republican	1916	Incumbent re-elected.	▌ ✓ John Franklin Miller (Republican) 56.7%; ▌James A. Duncan (Farmer–Labor) 31.0%; ▌Hugh C. Todd (Democratic) 12.3%
Washington 2	Lindley H. Hadley	Republican	1914	Incumbent re-elected.	▌ ✓ Lindley H. Hadley (Republican) 59.8%; ▌William Bouck (Farmer–Labor) 40.2%
Washington 3	Albert Johnson	Republican	1912	Incumbent re-elected.	▌ ✓ Albert Johnson (Republican) 55.7%; ▌Homer Bone (Farmer–Labor) 30.6%; ▌G. P. Fishburne (Democratic) 13.8%
Washington 4	John W. Summers	Republican	1918	Incumbent re-elected.	▌ ✓ John W. Summers (Republican) 63.2%; ▌Fred Miller (Democratic) 18.9%; ▌Knute Hill (Farmer–Labor) 17.9%
Washington 5	J. Stanley Webster	Republican	1918	Incumbent re-elected.	▌ ✓ J. Stanley Webster (Republican) 58.1%; ▌C. A. Fleming (Democratic) 41.9%

== West Virginia ==
District	Incumbent			This race	
District	Member	Party	First elected	Results	Candidates
West Virginia 1	Matthew M. Neely	Democratic	1912	Incumbent lost re-election. Republican gain.	▌ ✓ Benjamin L. Rosenbloom (Republican) 50.3%; ▌Matthew M. Neely (Democratic) 49.7%
West Virginia 2	George M. Bowers	Republican	1914	Incumbent re-elected.	▌ ✓ George M. Bowers (Republican) 56.8%; ▌Forrest W. Brown (Democratic) 43.2%
West Virginia 3	Stuart F. Reed	Republican	1916	Incumbent re-elected.	▌ ✓ Stuart F. Reed (Republican) 57.7%; ▌Robert F. Kidd (Democratic) 42.3%
West Virginia 4	Harry C. Woodyard	Republican	1914	Incumbent re-elected.	▌ ✓ Harry C. Woodyard (Republican) 55.4%; ▌John L. Conner (Democratic) 44.6%
West Virginia 5	Wells Goodykoontz	Republican	1918	Incumbent re-elected.	▌ ✓ Wells Goodykoontz (Republican) 54.1%; ▌W. W. McNeal (Democratic) 45.9%
West Virginia 6	Leonard S. Echols	Republican	1918	Incumbent re-elected.	▌ ✓ Leonard S. Echols (Republican) 54.4%; ▌William E. Wilson (Democratic) 45.6%

== Wisconsin ==
District	Incumbent			This race	
District	Member	Party	First elected	Results	Candidates
Wisconsin 1	Clifford E. Randall	Republican	1918	Incumbent lost renomination. Republican hold.	▌ ✓ Henry A. Cooper (Republican) 75.9%; ▌Andrew F. Stahl (Democratic) 20.3%; ▌Samuel S. Walkup (Social-Democratic) 3.8%
Wisconsin 2	Edward Voigt	Republican	1916	Incumbent re-elected.	▌ ✓ Edward Voigt (Republican) 67.2%; ▌Harry W. Bolens (Democratic) 24.3%; ▌Jacob F. Miller (Social-Democratic) 8.4%
Wisconsin 3	James G. Monahan	Republican	1918	Incumbent lost renomination. Republican hold.	▌ ✓ John M. Nelson (Republican) 69.1%; ▌James W. Murphy (Democratic) 30.9%
Wisconsin 4	John C. Kleczka	Republican	1918	Incumbent re-elected.	▌ ✓ John C. Kleczka (Republican) 50.2%; ▌Robert Buech (Social-Democratic) 38.5%; ▌Gerald P. Hayes (Democratic) 11.2%
Wisconsin 5	Victor L. Berger	Social-Democratic	1918	Incumbent lost re-election. Republican gain.	▌ ✓ William H. Stafford (Republican) 54.5%; ▌Victor L. Berger (Social-Democratic) 45.5%
Wisconsin 6	Florian Lampert	Republican	1918	Incumbent re-elected.	▌ ✓ Florian Lampert (Republican) 68.7%; ▌Leo P. Fox (Democratic) 21.0%; ▌Edward C. Damrow (Social-Democratic) 10.3%
Wisconsin 7	John J. Esch	Republican	1898	Incumbent lost renomination. Republican hold.	▌ ✓ Joseph D. Beck (Republican) 78.3%; ▌Robert H. Clarke (Prohibition) 18.8%; ▌A. W. Steinbach (Social-Democratic) 2.7%
Wisconsin 8	Edward E. Browne	Republican	1912	Incumbent re-elected.	▌ ✓ Edward E. Browne (Republican) 61.8%; ▌George W. Lippert (Social-Democratic) 26.5%; ▌L. P. Pasternacki (Democratic) 11.6%
Wisconsin 9	David G. Classon	Republican	1916	Incumbent re-elected.	▌ ✓ David G. Classon (Republican) 59.2%; ▌A. R. McDonald (Democratic) 37.2%; ▌H. G. Hanrahan (Social-Democratic) 3.6%
Wisconsin 10	James A. Frear	Republican	1912	Incumbent re-elected.	▌ ✓ James A. Frear (Republican) 99.4%; ▌Thomas Ryan (Independent) 0.5%
Wisconsin 11	Adolphus Peter Nelson	Republican	1918	Incumbent re-elected.	▌ ✓ Adolphus Peter Nelson (Republican) 85.3%; ▌John P. Jensen (Social-Democratic) 14.6%

== Wyoming ==
District	Incumbent			This race	
District	Member	Party	First elected	Results	Candidates
Wyoming at-large	Frank W. Mondell	Republican	1898	Incumbent re-elected.	▌ ✓ Frank W. Mondell (Republican) 61.5%; ▌Wade H. Fowler (Democratic) 26.5%; ▌James Morgan (Labor) 10.7%; ▌Anthony Carlson (Socialist) 1.3%

== Non-voting delegates ==
=== Alaska Territory ===
District	Incumbent			This race	
District	Delegate	Party	First elected	Results	Candidates
Alaska Territory at-large	James Wickersham	Republican	1908; 1916 (lost; won contest); 1918 (lost; won contest)	Incumbent retired. Republican hold.	▌ ✓ Daniel Sutherland (Republican); [data missing]

== See also ==
- 1920 United States elections
  - 1920 United States presidential election
  - 1920 United States Senate elections
- 66th United States Congress
- 67th United States Congress

== Bibliography ==
- "Statistics of the Congressional and Presidential Election of November 2, 1920" (PDF). Office of the Clerk, U.S. House of Representatives. 1921.
- Dubin, Michael J. (March 1, 1998). United States Congressional Elections, 1788-1997: The Official Results of the Elections of the 1st Through 105th Congresses. McFarland and Company. ISBN 978-0786402830.
- Martis, Kenneth C. (January 1, 1989). The Historical Atlas of Political Parties in the United States Congress, 1789-1989. Macmillan Publishing Company. ISBN 978-0029201701.
- Moore, John L., ed. (1994). Congressional Quarterly's Guide to U.S. Elections (Third ed.). Congressional Quarterly Inc. ISBN 978-0871879967.
- "Party Divisions of the House of Representatives* 1789–Present". Office of the Historian, House of United States House of Representatives.
