= John G. McHenry =

American politician

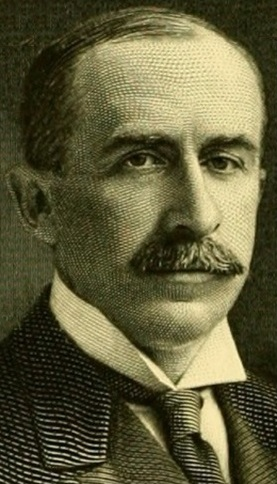
Frontispiece of 1913's Late a Representative

John Geiser McHenry (April 26, 1868 – December 27, 1912) was a Democratic member of the U.S. House of Representatives from Pennsylvania.

== Biography ==
John G. McHenry was born in Benton Township, Pennsylvania on April 26, 1868. He attended the public schools and Orangeville Academy. He became a successful farmer, banker and distiller. He was the organizer of the Grange national banks throughout Pennsylvania. From 1897 to 1898 he served as chairman of the Columbia County Democratic Committee.

McHenry was elected as a Democrat to the Sixtieth, Sixty-first, and Sixty-second Congresses. He had been in failing health throughout 1912, and had not been a candidate for reelection. He was serving his final term when he died in Benton, Pennsylvania on December 27, 1912. Interment in Benton Cemetery.

== See also ==
- List of members of the United States Congress who died in office (1900–1949)

== Sources ==
=== Books ===
- United States Congress (1913). John G. McHenry, Late a Representative from Pennsylvania. Washington, DC: US Government Printing Office.

=== Newspapers.com ===
- "James G. M'Henry Dies in His Home in Benton". Pittsburgh Post. Pittsburgh, PA. December 28, 1912 – via Newspapers.com.
- "McHenry Funeral". Mount Carmel Item. Mount Carmel, PA. December 28, 1912 – via Newspapers.com.

== External sources ==
- United States Congress. "John G. McHenry (id: M000470)". Biographical Directory of the United States Congress.
- John Geiser McHenry at The Political Graveyard

U.S. House of Representatives
Preceded by Edmund W. Samuel	Member of the U.S. House of Representatives from Pennsylvania's 16th congressional district 1907–1912	Succeeded by John V. Lesher
