= John V. Lesher =

American politician

John Vandling Lesher
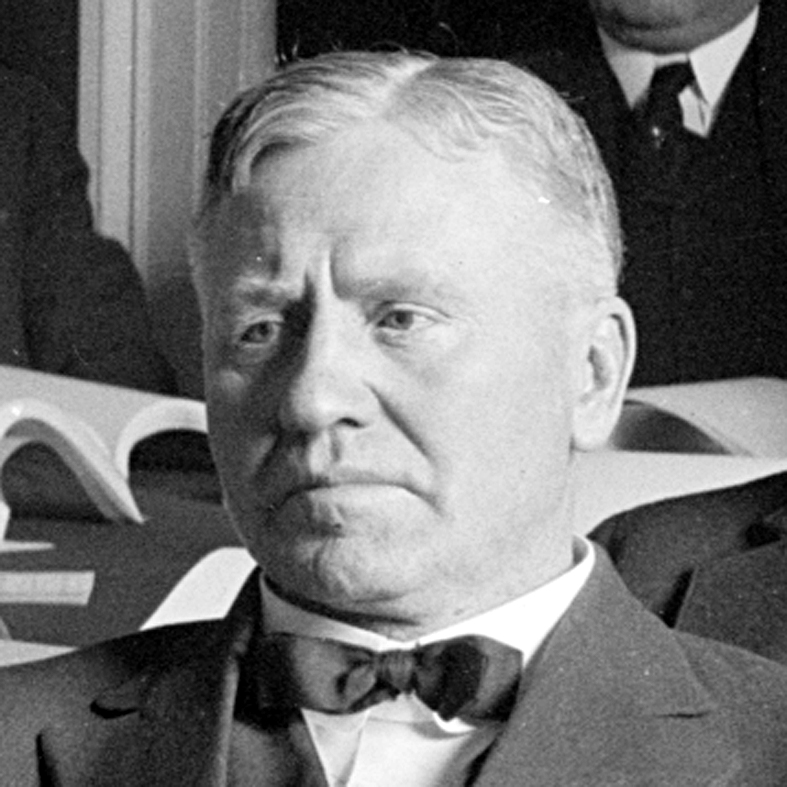

Member of the U.S. House of Representatives from Pennsylvania's 16th district
- In office March 4, 1913 – March 3, 1921
- Preceded by: John G. McHenry
- Succeeded by: I. Clinton Kline

Personal details
- Born: July 27, 1866 Blue Hill, Pennsylvania, U.S.
- Died: May 3, 1932 (aged 65) Danville, Pennsylvania, U.S.
- Resting place: Riverview Cemetery in Northumberland, Pennsylvania
- Party: Democratic
- Education: Bucknell University
- Profession: lawyer, politician

Military service
- Branch/service: Pennsylvania National Guard

John Vandling Lesher (July 27, 1866 – May 3, 1932) was an American lawyer and businessman who was a Democratic member of the U.S. House of Representatives from Pennsylvania, serving four terms from 1913 to 1921.

== Early life ==
Lesher was born on a farm in Blue Hill, Pennsylvania. He attended the rural schools in his native county and the State Normal School at Bloomsburg, Pennsylvania.

== Career ==
He taught school for several years in Union and Snyder Counties. He graduated from Bucknell University in Lewisburg, Pennsylvania, in 1897.

=== Military service ===
He enlisted in Company K of the Pennsylvania National Guard in 1898, and when it was transferred to the Twelfth Regiment he served as a first lieutenant.

=== Legal and business career ===
He was promoted to quartermaster with rank of captain, serving until 1902. He studied law, was admitted to the bar in 1900 and commenced practice in Sunbury, Pennsylvania. He served as the assistant district attorney of Northumberland County, Pennsylvania. He was also engaged in banking and real estate development.

=== Congress ===
In 1912, Lesher was elected as a Democrat to the sixty-third and to the three succeeding congresses. He was an unsuccessful candidate for reelection to a fifth term in 1920.

== Death and burial ==
He resumed the practice of law in Sunbury, Pennsylvania, and died in Danville, Pennsylvania. Interment in Riverview Cemetery in Northumberland, Pennsylvania.

== Sources ==
- United States Congress. "John V. Lesher (id: L000250)". Biographical Directory of the United States Congress.
- The Political Graveyard

U.S. House of Representatives
Preceded by John G. McHenry	Member of the U.S. House of Representatives from Pennsylvania's 16th congressional district 1913–1921	Succeeded by I. Clinton Kline
