= I. Clinton Kline =

American politician

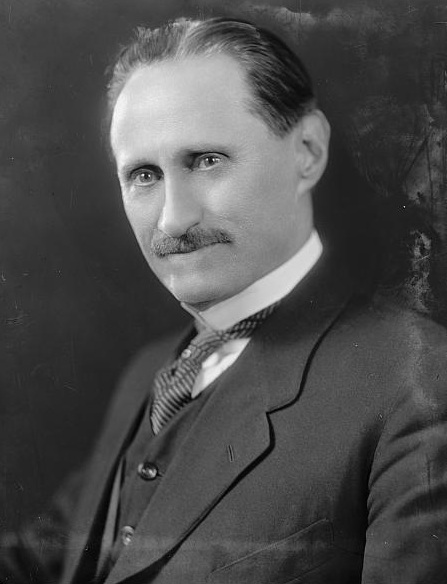
- Harris & Ewing Collection, Library of Congress

Member of the U.S. House of Representatives from Pennsylvania's 16th district
- In office March 4, 1921 – March 3, 1923
- Preceded by: John V. Lesher
- Succeeded by: Edgar R. Kiess

Personal details
- Born: August 18, 1858 Mount Pleasant, Pennsylvania, U.S.
- Died: December 2, 1947 (aged 89) DeLand, Florida, U.S.
- Party: Republican
- Education: State Normal School (Bloomsburg); Bucknell Academy; Lafayette College

Isaac Clinton Kline (August 18, 1858 – December 2, 1947) was a Republican member of the U.S. House of Representatives from Pennsylvania.

== Biography ==
He was born in Mount Pleasant, Pennsylvania. He attended the State Normal School in Bloomsburg, Pennsylvania, and Bucknell Academy in Lewisburg, Pennsylvania. He graduated from Lafayette College in Easton, Pennsylvania, in 1893. He taught school five years before entering college. He studied law, was admitted to the bar in 1894 and commenced practice in Sunbury, Pennsylvania.

Kline was an unsuccessful candidate for election in 1912, but was elected as a Republican to the Sixty-seventh Congress. He was an unsuccessful candidate for reelection in 1922. He resumed the practice of his profession in Sunbury, and died in DeLand, Florida. Interment in Pomfret Manor Cemetery, in Sunbury.

== Sources ==
- United States Congress. "Isaac Clinton Kline (id: K000267)". Biographical Directory of the United States Congress.
- The Political Graveyard

U.S. House of Representatives
Preceded by John V. Lesher	Member of the U.S. House of Representatives from Pennsylvania's 16th congressional district 1921–1923	Succeeded by Edgar R. Kiess
