= Edgar R. Kiess =

American politician

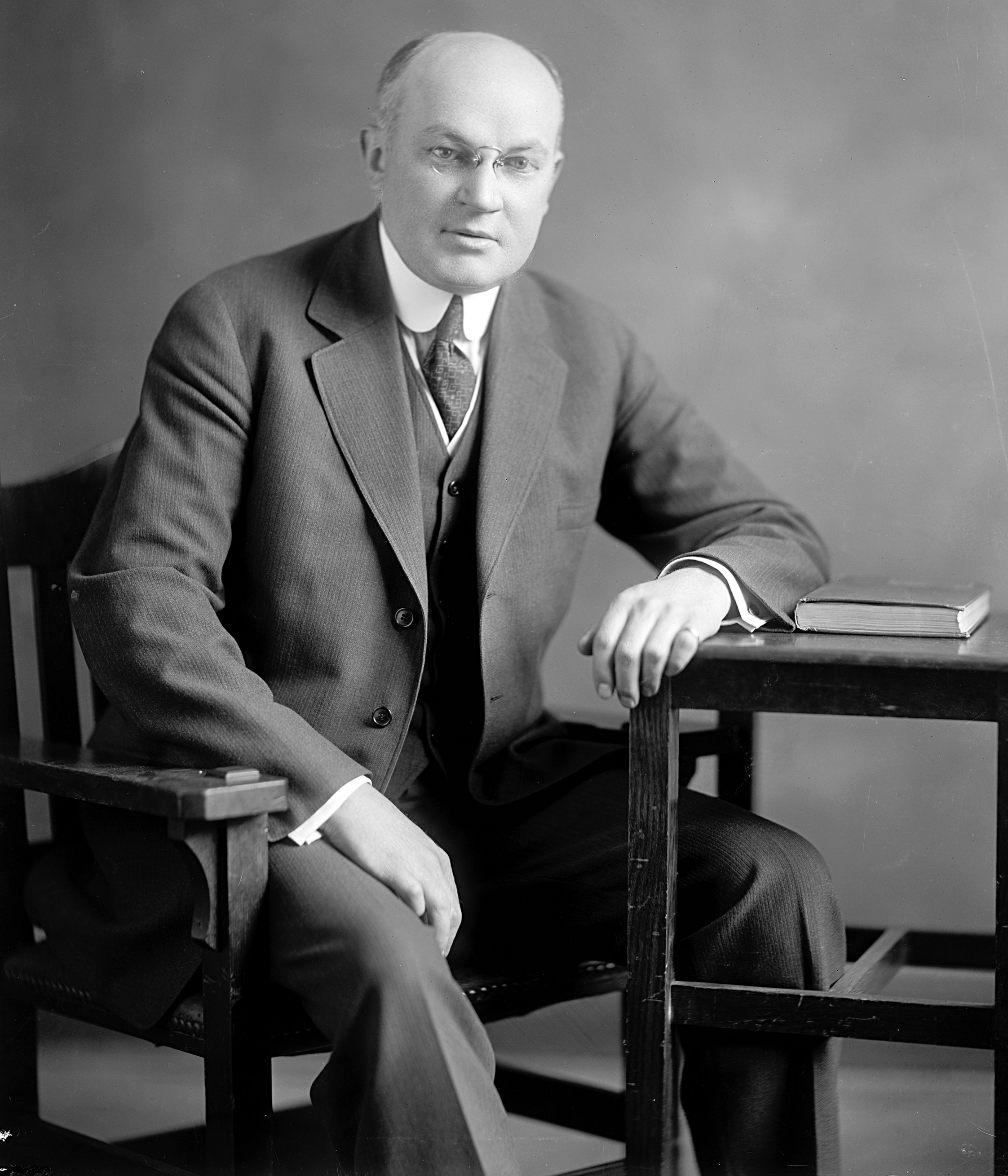

Member of the U.S. House of Representatives from Pennsylvania
- In office March 4, 1913 – July 20, 1930
- Preceded by: William B. Wilson (15th); I. Clinton Kline (16th)
- Succeeded by: Louis T. McFadden (15th); Robert F. Rich (16th)
- Constituency: 15th district (1913-23); 16th district (1923-30)

Member of the Pennsylvania House of Representatives
- In office 1904–1910

Personal details
- Born: August 26, 1875 Warrensville, Pennsylvania, US
- Died: July 20, 1930 (aged 54) Eagles Mere, Pennsylvania, US
- Party: Republican

Edgar Raymond Kiess (August 26, 1875 – July 20, 1930) was a Republican member of the U.S. House of Representatives from Pennsylvania.

== Biography ==
Kiess was born in Warrensville, Pennsylvania. He graduated from the Lycoming County Normal School in Muncy, Pennsylvania, in 1892. He taught in the public schools of Lycoming County for two years. He became engaged in the newspaper publishing business in Hughesville, Pennsylvania, in 1894. He served as a member of the Pennsylvania State House of Representatives from 1904 to 1910. He was engaged in business in Williamsport, Pennsylvania, in 1910, and served as a trustee of Pennsylvania State College from 1912 to 1930.

Kiess was elected as a Republican to the Sixty-third and to the eight succeeding Congresses and served until his death at his summer home at Eagles Mere, Pennsylvania in 1930. He served as chairman of the House Committee on Insular Affairs, which had jurisdiction over United States territories such as Puerto Rico and the Philippines, during the Sixty-ninth through Seventy-first Congresses. Interment was at Wildwood Cemetery in Williamsport.

== See also ==
- List of members of the United States Congress who died in office (1900–1949)

== Sources ==
- United States Congress. "Edgar R. Kiess (id: K000168)". Biographical Directory of the United States Congress.

U.S. House of Representatives
Preceded by William B. Wilson	Member of the U.S. House of Representatives from Pennsylvania's 15th congressional district 1913–1923	Succeeded by Louis T. McFadden
Preceded by I. Clinton Kline	Member of the U.S. House of Representatives from Pennsylvania's 16th congressional district 1923–1930	Succeeded by Robert F. Rich
