= Crisp County School District =

School district in Georgia (U.S. state)

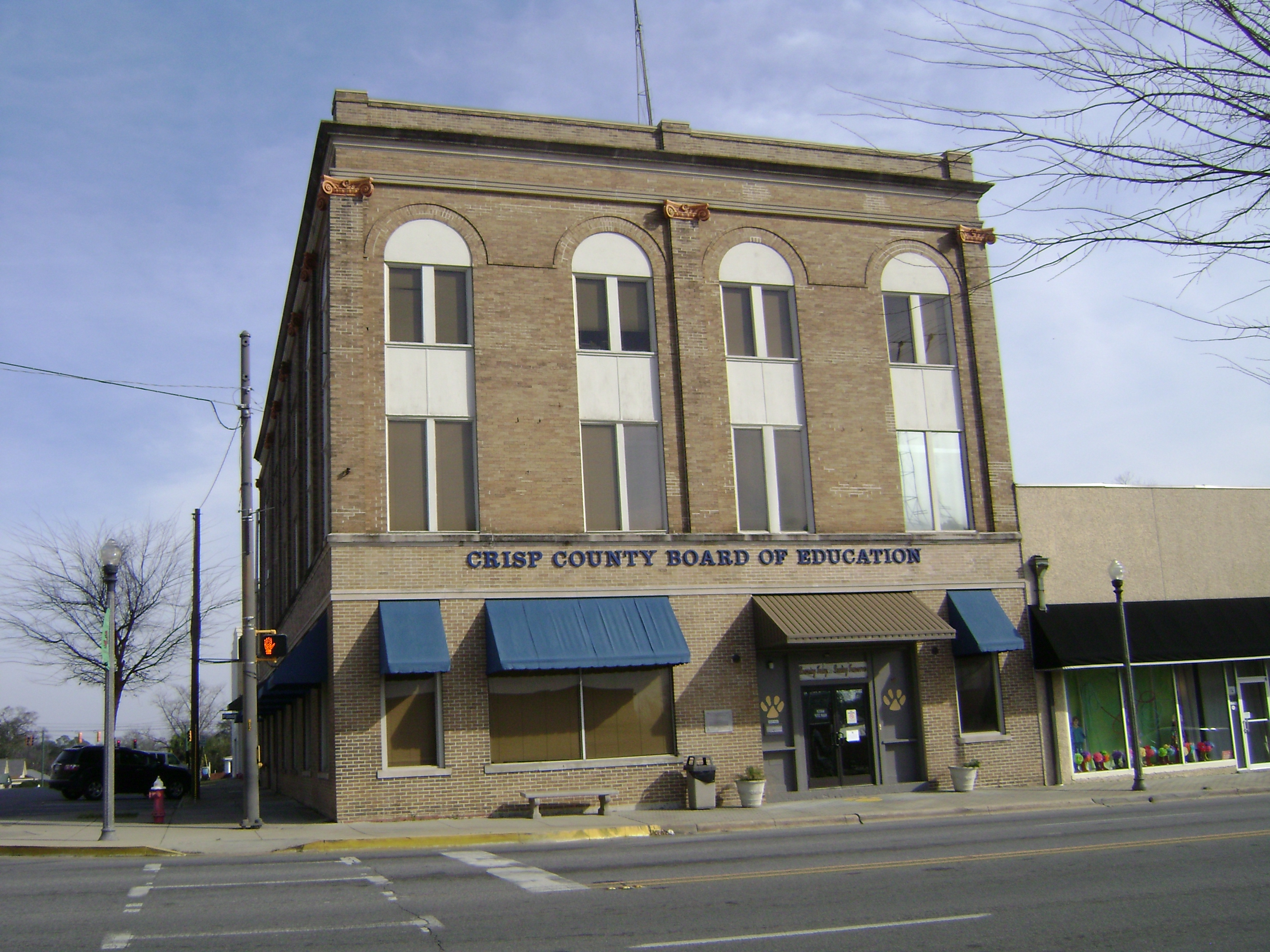

Address
- 201 S 7th St. Cordele, Georgia, 31015-4215; United States
- Coordinates: 31.967957°N 83.782878°W

District information
- Grades: Pre-school - 12
- Superintendent: Cindy Hughes
- Accreditations: Southern Association of Colleges and Schools; Georgia Accrediting Commission

Students and staff
- Enrollment: 4,337
- Faculty: 266

Other information
- Telephone: (229) 276-3400
- Fax: (229) 276-3406
- Website: www.crispschools.org

The Crisp County School District is a public school district in Crisp County, Georgia, United States, based in Cordele. It serves the communities of Arabi and Cordele.

== Schools ==
Crisp County School District includes the following schools:

- Crisp County Pre-K
- Crisp County Primary
- Crisp County Elementary
- Crisp County Middle
- Crisp County High School
- Crisp County Learning Center

== Athletics ==
The sports team for Crisp County is called the Crisp County Cougars.

=== Men's ===
- Baseball
- American Football. Quay Walker, a linebacker for the Green Bay Packers, played for the Crisp County Cougars.

=== Women's ===
- Volleyball
