= Elijah B. Lewis =

American politician

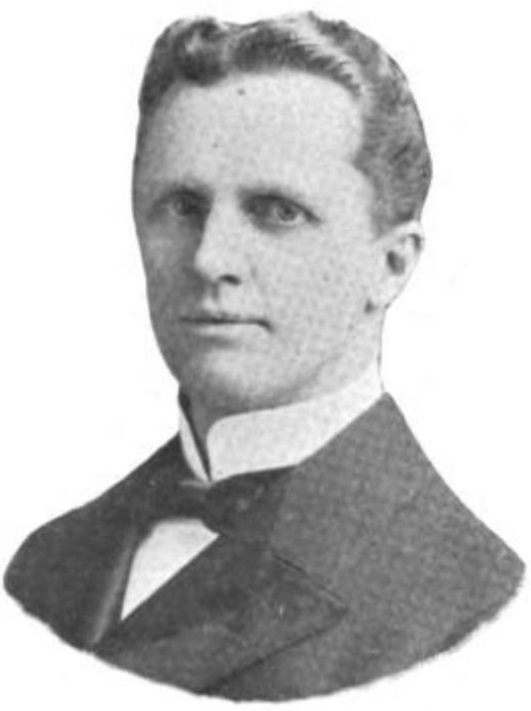

Member of the U.S. House of Representatives from Georgia's 3rd district
- In office March 4, 1897 – March 3, 1909
- Preceded by: Charles R. Crisp
- Succeeded by: Dudley Mays Hughes

Personal details
- Born: March 27, 1854 Coney, Georgia, U.S.
- Died: December 10, 1920 (aged 66) Montezuma, Georgia, U.S.
- Party: Democratic

Elijah Banks Lewis (March 27, 1854 – December 10, 1920) was a U.S. representative from Georgia.

Born in Coney, Crisp County, Georgia, Lewis attended the common schools of Dooly and Macon Counties, Spalding Seminary, Spalding, Georgia, and a business school in Macon, Georgia. He moved to Montezuma, Georgia, in 1871 and engaged in banking and mercantile pursuits. He served as a member of the State senate in 1894 and 1895.

Lewis was elected as a Democrat to the Fifty-fifth and to the five succeeding Congresses (March 4, 1897 – March 3, 1909). He was an unsuccessful candidate for renomination in 1908 to the Sixty-first Congress. He engaged in his former business activities until his death in Montezuma, Georgia, on December 10, 1920. He was interred in Felton Cemetery.

U.S. House of Representatives
Preceded by Charles R. Crisp	Member of the U.S. House of Representatives from Georgia's 3rd congressional district March 4, 1897 – March 3, 1909	Succeeded by Dudley M. Hughes
