= Buddy Harden =

American politician from Georgia

O. H. Buddy Harden

Member of the Georgia House of Representatives from the 148th district
- In office 2008 – January 14, 2019
- Preceded by: Johnny W. Floyd
- Succeeded by: Noel Williams Jr.

Personal details
- Born: November 3, 1940 (age 85) United States
- Party: Republican

Oren Hall "Buddy" Harden, Jr. (born November 3, 1940) is an American politician from Cordele, Georgia. He previously served as a member of the Georgia House of Representatives from the 148th District, serving from 2008 until Jan. 14, 2019. He is a member of the Republican Party.
