= Georgia's 148th House of Representatives district =

State district in Georgia, USA

Georgia's 148th State House of Representatives district
Representative
Noel Williams Jr. R–Cordele
- Demographics: 57.1% White; 35.8% Black; 4.1% Hispanic; 0.8% Asian
- Population: 53,158

District 148 elects one member of the Georgia House of Representatives. It contains the entirety of Crisp County, Pulaski County and Wilcox County, as well as parts of Ben Hill County and Houston County.

== Members ==
- Buddy Harden (2008–2019)
- Noel Williams Jr. (since 2019)
