= Brooke Huckaby =

American politician

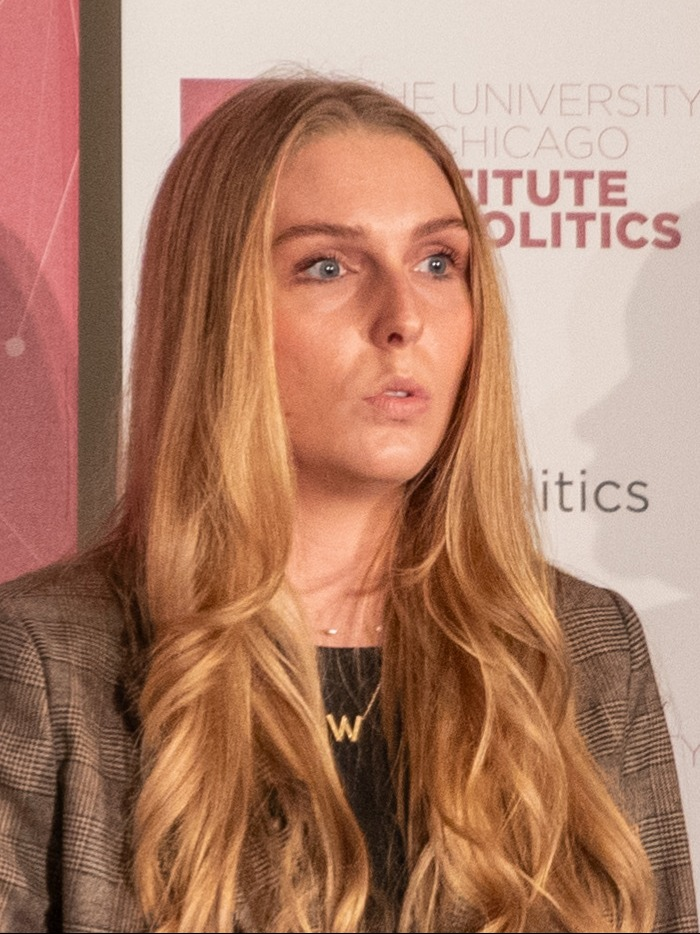
- Huckaby in 2026

Mayor of Arabi, Georgia
- Incumbent
- Assumed office January 2024
- Preceded by: Craig Huckaby

Personal details
- Born: March 4, 2003 (age 23) Arabi, Georgia, U.S.
- Party: Republican
- Spouse: Cole Wilson (m. 2024)

Brooke Huckaby Wilson (/ˈhʌkəbi/, born March 4, 2003) is an American politician who is currently the mayor of Arabi, Georgia. Elected at 20, Huckaby is currently the youngest elected mayor in the history of Georgia and the youngest elected female mayor in the history of the United States.

== Career ==
After Huckaby's father, Craig Huckaby, declined to run for another term as mayor, Huckaby chose to put her name on the ballot and run for mayor to succeed him. Huckaby, a Republican, was elected mayor on November 7th, 2023, at 20 years old, becoming the youngest woman elected as mayor in the history of Georgia and the United States. Some on social media have criticized that nepotism on behalf of her father who was previously the mayor, and Arabi's small population were reasons Huckaby was elected. Huckaby's goals as mayor include establishing a police force in Arabi and inspiring other members of Gen Z to become active in politics.

In a meeting with the Cordele Rotary Club on April 15, 2026, Huckaby announced her intention to run for re-election in 2028. Huckaby also announced plans for a new recreational infrastructure and a wastewater treatment facility in Arabi, along with completing implementation of a city police department and high-speed Wi-Fi.

== Personal life ==
Concurrent with serving as mayor, Huckaby is a student at Abraham Baldwin Agricultural College, where she is majoring in agricultural technology. Huckaby also works as a part-time employee for the Georgia Department of Agriculture.

Huckaby sang the national anthem at a Donald Trump rally in Macon on November 3, 2024.

Huckaby married her husband, Cole Wilson, on November 16, 2024.
