= Chris Paul Jr. =

American football player (born 2002)

Dallas Renegades
- Position: Linebacker
- Roster status: Unsigned draft pick

Personal information
- Born: November 4, 2002 (age 24); Cordele, Georgia, U.S.
- Listed height: 6 ft 1 in (1.85 m)
- Listed weight: 235 lb (107 kg)

Career information
- High school: Crisp County (Cordele, Georgia)
- College: Arkansas (2021–2023); Ole Miss (2024)
- NFL draft: 2025: 5th round, 172nd overall pick

Career history
- Los Angeles Rams (2025)*; Seattle Seahawks (2025)*; Dallas Renegades (2027-present)
- * Offseason or practice squad member only

Awards and highlights
- Super Bowl champion (LX)
- Stats at Pro Football Reference

Christopher "Pooh" Paul Jr. (born November 4, 2002) is an American professional football linebacker for the Dallas Renegades of the UFL. He played college football for the Arkansas Razorbacks and Ole Miss Rebels. Paul was selected by the Los Angeles Rams in the fifth round of the 2025 NFL draft.

== Early life ==
Paul Jr. was born on November 4, 2002 in Cordele, Georgia. He attended Crisp County High School in Cordele, where he played linebacker and running back. He had 157 tackles with 4.5 sacks his junior year, and 91 tackles with 2.5 sacks as a senior. He committed to the University of Arkansas to play college football.

== College career ==
Paul Jr. played in four games and took a redshirt his first year at Arkansas in 2021. As a redshirt freshman in 2022, he started two of 13 games and recorded 62 tackles and four sacks. As a redshirt sophomore in 2023, Paul Jr. started nine of 11 games and finished with 74 tackles and two sacks. After the season, he entered the transfer portal and transferred to the University of Mississippi. Paul Jr. was a starter in his first season at Ole Miss in 2024, where he was named to the All-SEC second team but selected by the USA Today to their All-America first team.

== Professional career ==
Pre-draft measurables
Height	Weight	Arm length	Hand span	Wingspan	40-yard dash	10-yard split	20-yard split	20-yard shuttle	Three-cone drill	Vertical jump	Broad jump
6 ft 0 7/8 in (1.85 m)	222 lb (101 kg)	29 7/8 in (0.76 m)	9 3/8 in (0.24 m)	6 ft 3 3/8 in (1.91 m)	4.63 s	1.62 s	2.69 s	4.45 s	7.46 s	36.0 in (0.91 m)	9 ft 9 in (2.97 m)
All values from NFL Combine/Pro Day

=== Los Angeles Rams ===
Paul was selected by the Los Angeles Rams with the 172nd overall pick in the fifth round of the 2025 NFL draft. He was waived by Los Angeles on August 26, 2025 as a part of final roster cuts.

=== Seattle Seahawks ===
On August 28, 2025, Paul signed with the Seattle Seahawks' practice squad. On February 12, 2026, he signed a reserve/futures contract with Seattle.

On August 27, 2026, Paul was waived with an injury and reverted to injured reserve the next day. He was waived on August 31 from injured reserve with an injury settlement.

=== Dallas Renegades ===
On November 19, 2026 Paul was drafted by the Dallas Renegades in the 2027 UFL Draft.
