= Crisp County High School =

Public high school in Cordele, Georgia, United States

Location
- 2402 Cougar Alley; Cordele, Georgia 31015; United States; 31°56′39″N 83°45′04″W

Information
- School type: Public high school
- Motto: Learning today... Graduating our future leaders tomorrow
- Denomination: Crisp County School District
- Principal: Sowell
- Teaching staff: 62.60 (on an FTE basis)
- Grades: 9 – 12
- Gender: Co-ed
- Student to teacher ratio: 15.62
- Sports: Baseball, basketball, cheerleading, cross country, football, golf, soccer, softball, tennis, track and field, wrestling
- Mascot: Cougar
- Team name: Cougars
- Accreditation: Southern Association of Colleges and Schools
- Website: Crisp County High School

Crisp County High School is a public high school located in Cordele, Georgia, United States. The school is part of the Crisp County School District, which serves Crisp County.

== Notable alumni ==
- Bernard Ford, former professional football player
- Chris Paul Jr., college football player
- Andre Ramsey, former professional football player
- Tree Rollins, former professional basketball player
- Robert Tyler, professional baseball player
- Taylor Walls, professional baseball player
- Quay Walker, professional football player
- LAZER DIM 700, rapper
