= Robert Tyler (baseball) =

American baseball player

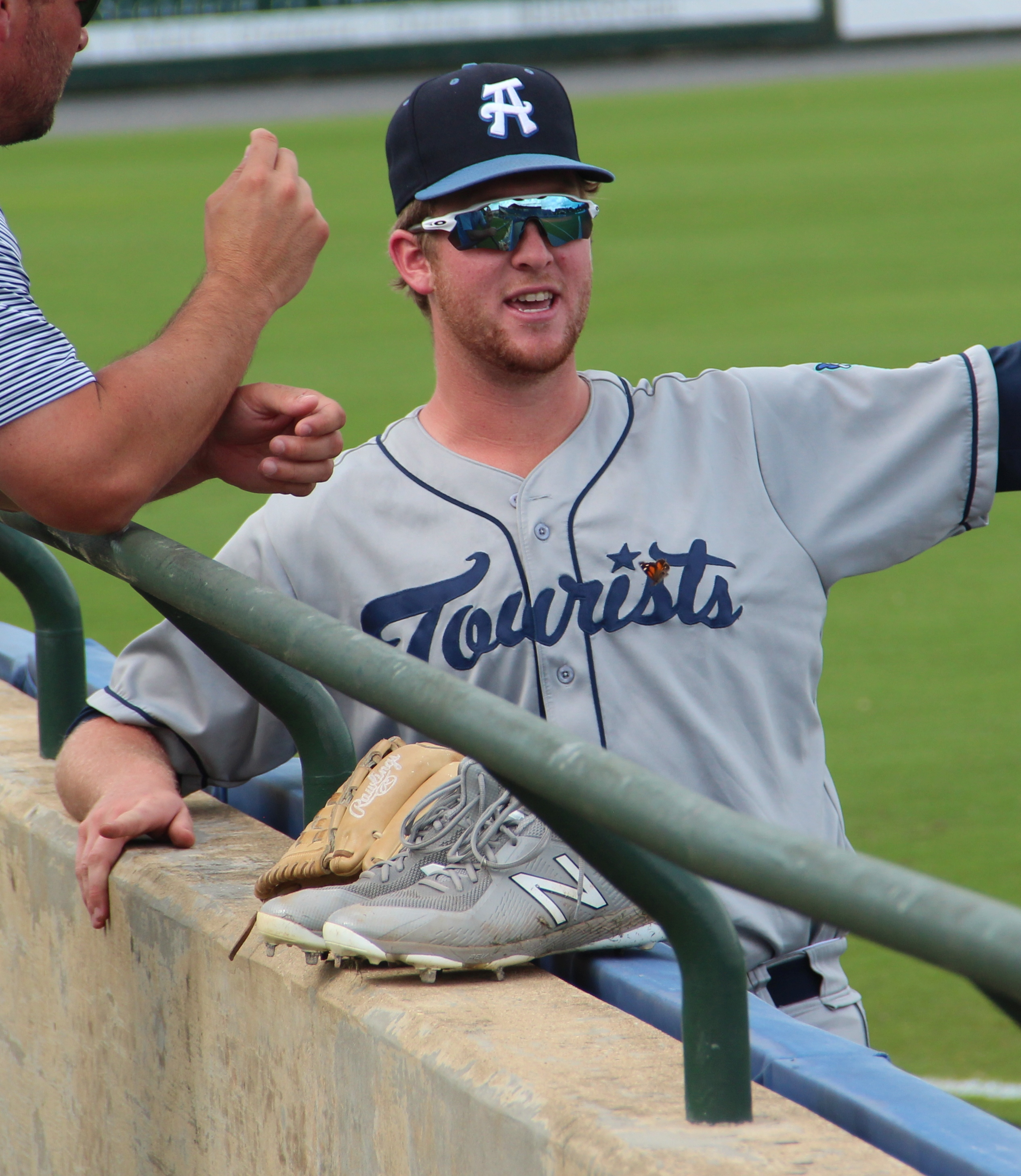
- Tyler with the Asheville Tourists in 2018
- Pitcher
- Born: June 18, 1995 (age 30); Cordele, Georgia, U.S.
- Bats: Left Throws: Right
- Stats at Baseball Reference

Robert Prosser Tyler (born June 18, 1995) is an American former professional baseball pitcher.

== Career ==
Tyler attended Crisp County High School in Cordele, Georgia. In 2013, his senior year, the Albany Herald named him their Player of the Year. He then enrolled at the University of Georgia to play college baseball for the Georgia Bulldogs. As a freshman, Collegiate Baseball named Tyler a Freshman All-American. In 2015, he played collegiate summer baseball with the Bourne Braves of the Cape Cod Baseball League.

The Colorado Rockies selected Tyler with the 38th overall selection of the 2016 MLB draft. Tyler signed with Colorado and was assigned to the Boise Hawks of the Class A-Short Season Northwest League, where he posted an 0–2 record and 6.43 ERA in five starts (seven innings). He did not pitch in 2017 due to shoulder fatigue. In 2018, he pitched for the Asheville Tourists of the Class A South Atlantic League and the Lancaster JetHawks of the Class A-Advanced California League, going a combined 4–3 with a 5.10 ERA over 47.2 innings. Tyler played for Lancaster in 2019, going 1–0 with a 8.16 ERA over 28.2 innings. He announced his retirement on January 12, 2020.
