= Dudley M. Hughes =

American politician

Dudley Mays Hughes
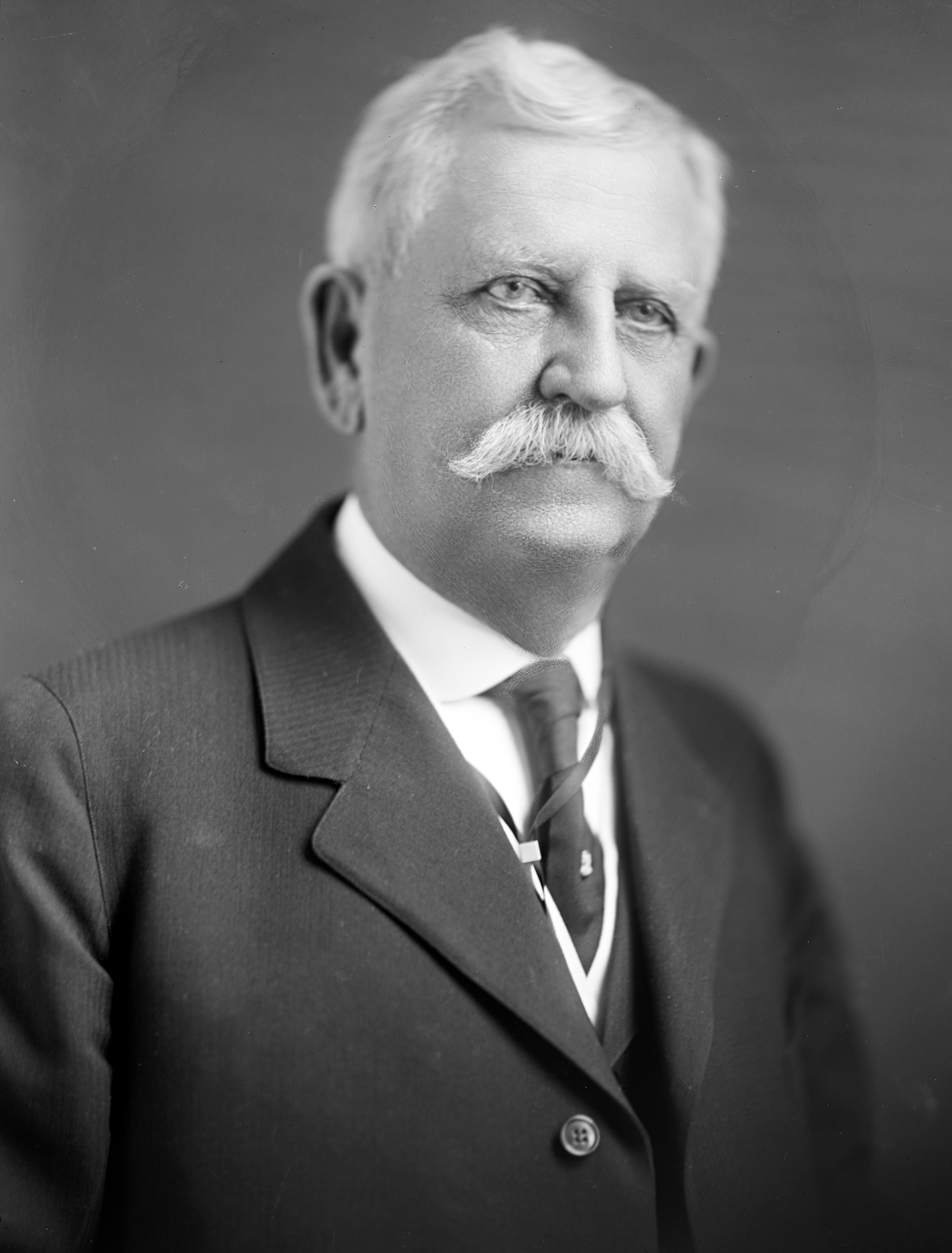

Member of the U.S. House of Representatives from Georgia
- In office March 4, 1909 – March 3, 1917
- Preceded by: Elijah B. Lewis (3rd); District established (12th)
- Succeeded by: Charles R. Crisp (3rd); William W. Larsen (12th)
- Constituency: 3rd district (1909-13); 12th district (1913-17)

Member of the Georgia Senate from the 21st district
- In office November 1, 1882 – September 26, 1883
- Preceded by: Richard Lawson Storey
- Succeeded by: H. B. Ridley

Personal details
- Born: October 10, 1848 Jeffersonville, Georgia, U.S.
- Died: January 20, 1927 (aged 78) Macon, Georgia, U.S.
- Resting place: Evergreen Cemetery; Perry, Georgia
- Party: Democratic
- Education: University of Georgia
- Profession: politician, farmer, railroad executive

Dudley Mays Hughes (October 10, 1848 – January 20, 1927) was an American politician, farmer and railroad executive.

Hughes was born in Jeffersonville, Georgia, and attended the University of Georgia in Athens.

In 1882, Hughes was elected to the Georgia Senate and reelected the next year. From 1904 to 1906, he served as the president of the Georgia State Agricultural Society. In 1905, he became a UGA trustee and remained on that board until his death. He also served on the board of trustees for the Danville School, the Georgia State Normal Institute and the Georgia State Agricultural College.

Hughes was involved in several business including Magnolia Orchard and the Georgia Fruit Land Company. He served as president of the Georgia Fruit Growers Association. After serving as one of the original founders of the Macon, Dublin & Savannah Railroad chartered in 1885, Hughes served as its president until 1891 and as a director.

In 1906, Hughes ran as a Democrat against incumbent Elijah B. Lewis in Georgia's 3rd congressional district in the United States House of Representatives and lost. In 1908, Hughes ran against Lewis again and won. He served four consecutive terms in office; however, the Georgia General Assembly reapportioned the congressional districts in 1912, and Hughes district became Georgia's 12th congressional district. Hughes lost his bid for reelection in 1916. He returned to farming in Danville, Georgia, and died in Macon, Georgia, in 1927. He was buried in Evergreen Cemetery in Perry, Georgia.

Dudley Hughes is the namesake to the city of Dudley, Georgia.

== Notes ==
U.S. House of Representatives
Preceded by Elijah B. Lewis	Member of the U.S. House of Representatives from Georgia's 3rd congressional district March 4, 1909 – March 3, 1913	Succeeded by Charles R. Crisp
Preceded by New seat	Member of the U.S. House of Representatives from Georgia's 12th congressional district March 4, 1913 – March 3, 1917	Succeeded by William W. Larsen
