= Charles R. Crisp =

American politician

Charles Robert Crisp
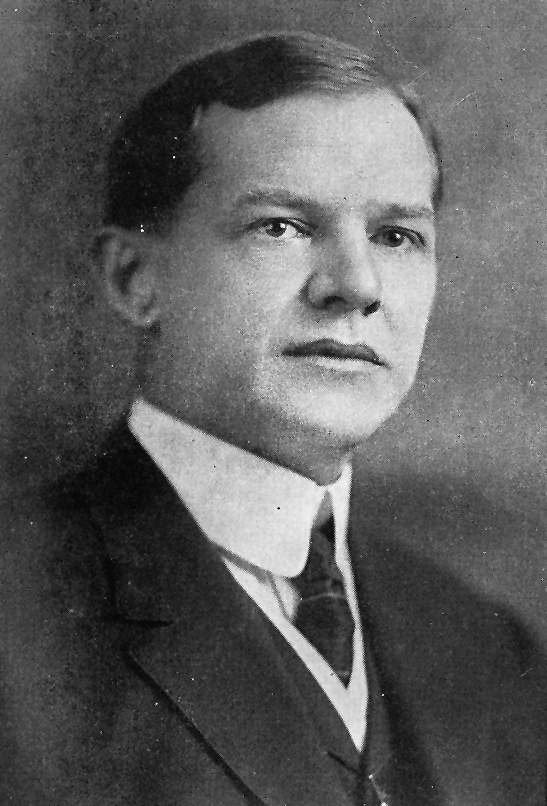

Member of the U.S. House of Representatives from Georgia's 3rd district
- In office December 19, 1896 – March 3, 1897
- Preceded by: Charles Frederick Crisp
- Succeeded by: Elijah B. Lewis
- In office March 4, 1913 – October 7, 1932
- Preceded by: Dudley M. Hughes
- Succeeded by: Bryant T. Castellow

Personal details
- Born: Charles Robert Crisp; October 19, 1870 Ellaville, Georgia, U.S.
- Died: February 7, 1937 (aged 66) Americus, Georgia, U.S.
- Party: Democratic

Charles Robert Crisp (October 19, 1870 – February 7, 1937) was an American politician. He served as in the United States House of Representatives from Georgia, and was the son of Charles Frederick Crisp.

== Life and career ==
Charles Robert Crisp was born on October 19, 1870, in Ellaville, Georgia. His father Charles Frederick Crisp was from England, and was a politician. Crisp attended the public schools of Americus, Georgia.

He served as clerk in the Interior Department in Washington, D.C., from 1889 to 1891. Followed by work as a Parliamentarian of the House of Representatives, from 1891 to 1895. He studied law. He was admitted to the bar in 1895, and commenced practicing law in Americus, Georgia.

Crisp was elected as a Democrat to the Fifty-fourth Congress to fill the vacancy caused by the death of his father, Charles F. Crisp, and served from December 19, 1896, to March 3, 1897. He was not a candidate for renomination in 1896. He resumed the practice of law in Americus, Georgia. He served as judge of the city court of Americus 1900-1912. Again parliamentarian of the House of Representatives in the Sixty-second Congress. Parliamentarian of the Democratic National Convention in 1912.

Crisp was elected to the Sixty-third and to the nine succeeding Congresses and served from March 4, 1913, until October 7, 1932, when he resigned to become a member of the United States Tariff Commission, in which capacity he served until December 30, 1932.

He was not a candidate for renomination in 1932, but was an unsuccessful candidate for the nomination for United States Senator to fill the vacancy occasioned by the death of William J. Harris where he lost the Democratic primary to the outgoing governor Richard Russell Jr..

He served as member of the American World War Debt Funding Commission and resumed his legal practice in Washington, D.C..

He died in Americus, Georgia, February 7, 1937. He was interred in Oak Grove Cemetery.

U.S. House of Representatives
Preceded by Charles F. Crisp	Member of the U.S. House of Representatives from Georgia's 3rd congressional district December 19, 1896 – March 3, 1897	Succeeded by Elijah B. Lewis
Preceded by Dudley M. Hughes	Member of the U.S. House of Representatives from Georgia's 3rd congressional district March 4, 1913 – October 7, 1932	Succeeded by Bryant T. Castellow
