= Andre Ramsey =

American football player (born 1987)

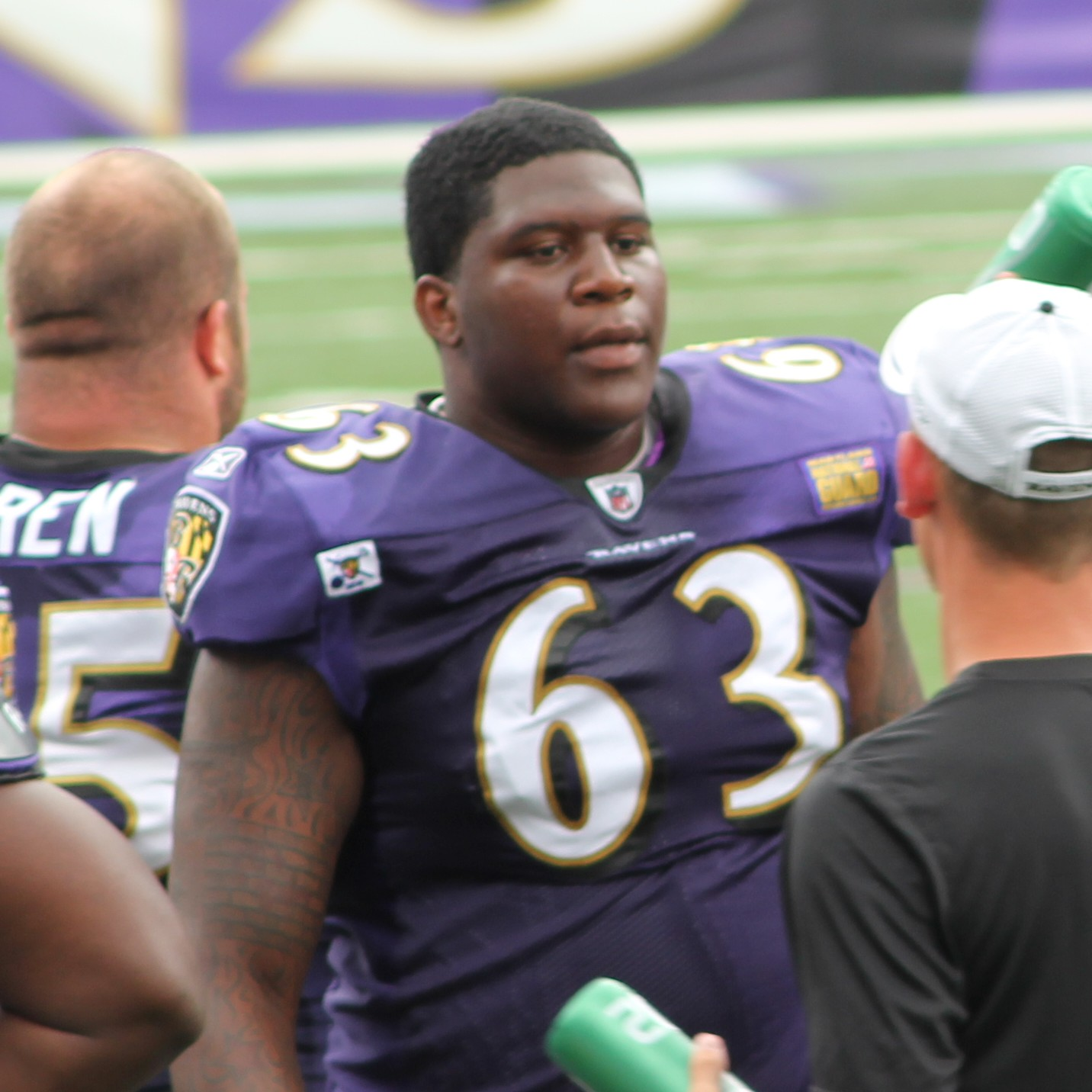
- Ramsey with the Baltimore Ravens in August 2011

No. 76, 63, 69
- Position: Offensive tackle

Personal information
- Born: July 24, 1987 (age 39); Portsmouth, New Hampshire, U.S.
- Listed height: 6 ft 5 in (1.96 m)
- Listed weight: 322 lb (146 kg)

Career information
- High school: Crisp County (Cordele, Georgia)
- College: Ball State
- NFL draft: 2009: undrafted

Career history
- Seattle Seahawks (2009)*; Buffalo Bills (2009); New York Jets (2010)*; Baltimore Ravens (2010)*; Miami Dolphins (2011)*; Kansas City Command (2012); Carolina Panthers (2012)*; BC Lions (2013–2014); Calgary Stampeders (2015); Orlando Predators (2016)*
- * Offseason or practice squad member only

Awards and highlights
- First-team All-MAC (2008)

Career NFL statistics
- Games played: 2
- Stats at Pro Football Reference
- Stats at ArenaFan.com

Andre Alexander Ramsey (born July 24, 1987) is an American former professional football player who was an offensive tackle in the National Football League (NFL) and Canadian Football League (CFL). He was signed by the Seattle Seahawks as a 7th round draft pick in 2009. He played college football for the Ball State Cardinals.

Ramsey was also a member of the Buffalo Bills, New York Jets, Baltimore Ravens, Miami Dolphins, Kansas City Command, Carolina Panthers, BC Lions, Calgary Stampeders, and Orlando Predators.

== Professional career ==
=== Seattle Seahawks ===
After going in the 7th round of the NFL draft Ramsey went on to play in 6 games that 2009 season recording 5 starts

=== Buffalo Bills ===
Ramsey was signed to the practice squad of the Buffalo Bills . He remained there until being promoted to the active roster on December 11 after offensive tackle Demetress Bell was placed on injured reserve.

=== New York Jets ===
The New York Jets signed Ramsey October 25, 2010. Ramsey went on to start 8 games that season at right and left tackle.

=== Baltimore Ravens ===
After trying out for the Ravens Andre went on to play in 12 games the next season with both starts at guard and tackle help his team to the AFC championship game

=== Miami Dolphins ===
The team signed Ramsey to their practice squad on November 30, 2011. He was on the practice roster for one game before being released.

=== Kansas City Command ===
Following his release from the Dolphins Ramsey signed with the Kansas City Command of the Arena Football League . The 2012 Arena Football League season spanned from March 9, 2012 – July 22, 2012.

=== Carolina Panthers ===
Signed as a free-agent by the Panthers on August 10, 2012. Where played in 14 games at left guard having his most productive season to date until being place on season ending IR week 14 of the season

=== BC Lions ===
On March 26, 2013, Andre Ramsey signed with the BC Lions of the Canadian Football League. Starting all 18 games at left tackle

=== Calgary Stampeders ===
In June 2015, Ramsey signed with the Calgary Stampeders where he started 12 games at left tackle

=== Orlando Predators ===
On December 7, 2015, Ramsey was assigned to the Orlando Predators. On May 25, 2016, Ramsey was placed on recallable reassignment.
