= Janie Lou Gibbs =

American serial killer (1932–2010)

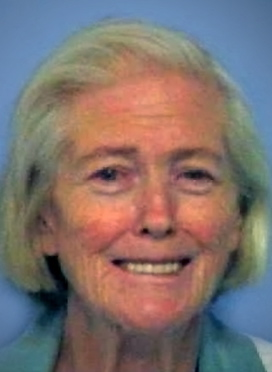
- Mugshot
- Born: Janie Lou Hickox; December 25, 1932; Cordele, Georgia, U.S.
- Died: February 7, 2010 (aged 77); Douglasville, Georgia, U.S.
- Motive: Life insurance money
- Conviction: Murder (5 counts)
- Penalty: Life imprisonment

Details
- Victims: 5
- Span of crimes: 1966–1967
- Country: United States
- State: Georgia
- Date apprehended: 1967; 59 years ago

Janie Lou Gibbs (née Hickox; December 25, 1932 – February 7, 2010) was an American serial killer from Cordele, Georgia, who killed her three sons, a grandson, and her husband, by poisoning them with arsenic in 1966 and 1967.

== Background ==
Gibbs was born in Georgia on December 25, 1932. She operated a daycare from her home and was a dedicated member of the local church community. She had been married to her husband Charles for 18 years before she began killing.

== Murders ==
In 1965, Gibbs committed her first murder, poisoning her husband Charles by putting arsenic into his dinner. While he was in hospital, she brought him homemade soup containing more poison. After Charles' death on January 21, 1966, doctors decided the cause of death had been a liver disease. After her husband's death, Gibbs was supported by the local church community. She later donated some of her husband's life insurance money to the church.

Eight months after the death of Gibbs's husband, she poisoned her youngest son, 13-year-old Marvin. He died on August 29, 1966. He was assumed to have inherited a liver disease from his father, but his death certificate listed hepatitis. Gibbs was not suspected of any wrongdoing, and she again donated a large portion of her life insurance payout to the local church. On January 23, 1967, another one of Gibbs's sons, 16-year-old Melvin, died suddenly. Doctors listed his cause of death as a rare muscular disorder, and for a third time, Gibbs donated most of the life insurance money to the church.

Gibbs now had only one son left, 19-year-old Roger. Roger had fathered a child named Ronnie with his wife, and Gibbs was seen to be delighted that she had become a grandmother. Soon, Ronnie became sick and died suddenly, followed only a month later by his father. Following the sudden deaths of a previously healthy young man and his infant son, the family physician became suspicious and referred the case to the state crime lab.

== Aftermath ==
An autopsy on Roger found that he had ingested a fatal amount of arsenic. Gibbs was arrested for murder on December 25, and the bodies of her husband and two buried sons were exhumed. Autopsies conducted in the cemetery revealed each of the five murdered members of the Gibbs household had arsenic present in their bodies.

Gibbs initially was found mentally unfit to stand trial and was confined to a mental institution where she worked as a cook. Later, she stood trial and was sentenced to five life sentences. She remained imprisoned until 1999 when she was diagnosed with Parkinson's disease and was released into the custody of her sister. She died in 2010 in a nursing home in Douglasville, Georgia.

== See also ==
- List of serial killers in the United States
