= Bryant T. Castellow =

American politician

Bryant Castellow
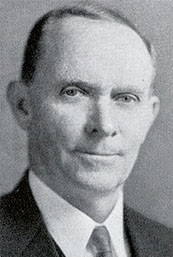

Member of the U.S. House of Representatives from Georgia's 3rd district
- In office November 8, 1932 – January 3, 1937
- Preceded by: Charles R. Crisp
- Succeeded by: Stephen Pace

Personal details
- Born: July 29, 1876 near Georgetown, Georgia, U.S.
- Died: July 23, 1962 (aged 85)
- Education: Mercer University; University of Georgia Law School

Bryant Thomas Castellow (July 29, 1876 – July 23, 1962) was an American politician, Congressman, educator, lawyer, and Judge.

== Early life, family and education ==
Castellow was born near Georgetown, Georgia. He attended high schools in Eufaula, Alabama and Coleman, Georgia. He then attended Mercer University and the University of Georgia School of Law where he was a member of the Phi Kappa Literary Society. Castellow earned a Bachelor of Laws from the University of Georgia in 1897.

== Career ==
After admittance to the state bar that same year, Castellow became a practicing lawyer in Fort Gaines, Georgia in 1898.

Castellow served as superintendent of the Coleman public schools in 1897 and 1898, captain in the Georgia State Troops, from 1899 until 1902 and solicitor of Clay County Court from 1900 through 1901. From 1901 until 1905, he was judge of the Clay County Court.

He then moved to Cuthbert, Georgia, in 1906 to become a Referee in Bankruptcy for the western division of the northern district of Georgia. In 1913, he became the solicitor general of the Pataula, Georgia, judicial circuit and remained in that position until 1932, when he successfully ran for office in the U.S. House of Representatives to replace the recently resigned Charles R. Crisp. Castellow was elected to two more terms in the House; he did not seek re-election in 1936.

U.S. House of Representatives
Preceded by Charles R. Crisp	Member of the U.S. House of Representatives from Georgia's 3rd congressional district November 8, 1932 – January 3, 1937	Succeeded by Stephen Pace
