= William Washington Larsen =

American politician

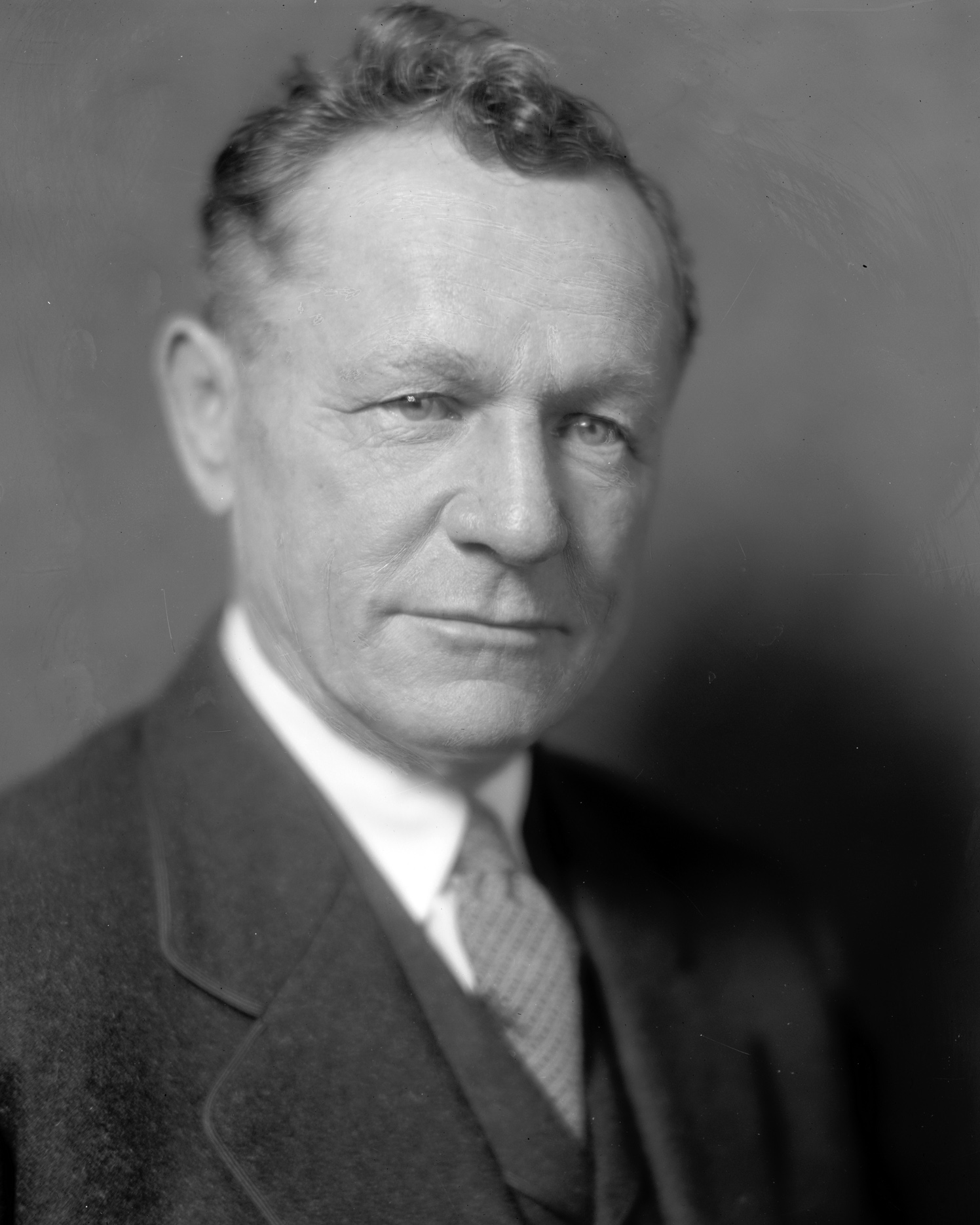

Member of the U.S. House of Representatives from Georgia's 12th district
- In office March 4, 1917 – March 3, 1933
- Preceded by: Dudley M. Hughes
- Succeeded by: Seat eliminated

Personal details
- Born: August 12, 1871 Hagan, Georgia, U.S.
- Died: January 5, 1938 (aged 66) Dublin, Georgia, U.S.
- Resting place: Northview Cemetery; Dublin, Georgia, U.S.
- Party: Democratic
- Relatives: William Washington Larsen Jr. (grandson)
- Education: Bryan Institute; South Georgia Military Academy; University of Georgia
- Profession: teacher, lawyer, politician

Military service
- Branch/service: Georgia National Guard
- Years of service: 1900–1904

William Washington Larsen (August 12, 1871 – January 5, 1938) was a United States representative from Georgia.

== Personal life ==
Larsen was born in Hagan, Georgia. He attended the Bryan Institute in Lanier, Georgia, the South Georgia Military Academy in Thomasville, Georgia, and the University of Georgia in Athens; however, he did not graduate. He taught school in 1895, studied law, gained admittance to the state bar in 1897 and became a practicing attorney in Swainsboro, Georgia. He served as a second lieutenant in the Swainsboro Guards, Company C, of the Georgia National Guard from 1900 to 1904.

In 1899, Larsen became the prosecuting attorney for the city court of Swainsboro and remained in that position through 1905. He also was a member of the council and mayor pro tempore of Swainsboro from 1905 to 1909. In 1912, he joined the board of trustees of the Georgia State Normal School in Athens and remained on that board until 1927. He served as a delegate to the 1902, 1906 and 1912 Democratic State conventions. After serving as the secretary of the executive department of the state of Georgia from 1910 to 1912, Larsen moved to Dublin, Georgia in January 1912. He began practicing law again and was involved in farming. He became a judge of the superior courts of the Dublin circuit in 1914 and 1915.

== Career ==
In 1916, Larsen was elected as a Democrat to the 65th United States Congress representing Georgia's 12th congressional district. He was reelected to that position for seven additional terms and did not seek reelection in 1932 as the 12th district became defunct after congressional apportionment reduced Georgia's number of seats in the U.S. House from twelve to ten.

Larsen joined the board of trustees of the University of Georgia in 1927, continued to serve as the board transitioned to the Georgia Board of Regents on January 1, 1932, and remained on that board through 1938. He was a regional manager for the Farm Credit Administration headquarters in Columbia, South Carolina from 1933 until his resignation in 1936. He won an appointment to the Georgia Unemployment Insurance Commission in 1937 and served until his death in Dublin on January 5, 1938. He was buried in that city's Northview Cemetery.

U.S. House of Representatives
Preceded by Dudley Mays Hughes	Member of the U.S. House of Representatives from Georgia's 12th congressional district March 4, 1917 – March 3, 1933	Succeeded by Seat eliminated
