= Arabi, Georgia =

- Town
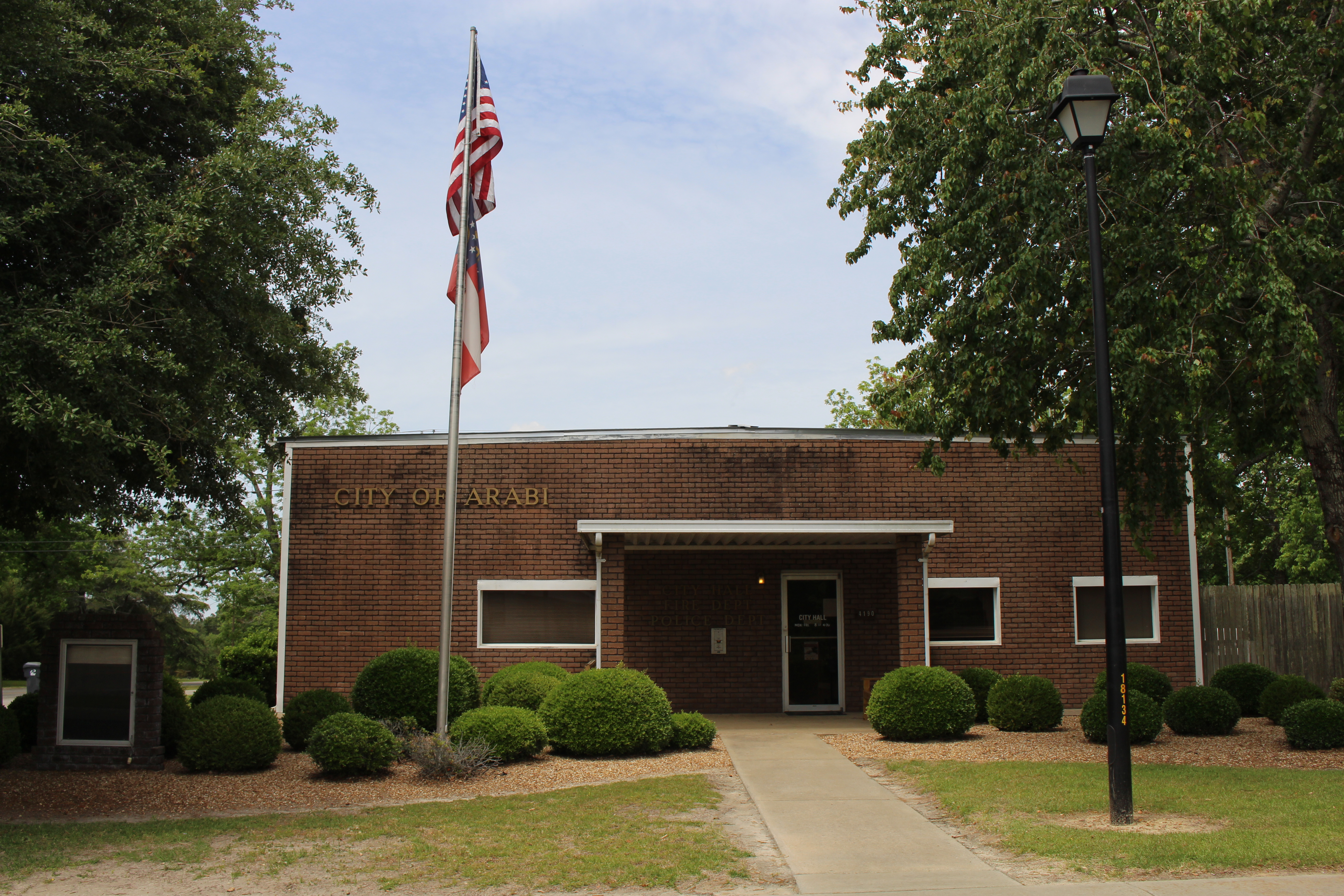
- Arabi City Hall, May 2018

- Location in Crisp County and the state of Georgia
- Coordinates: 31°50′1″N 83°44′6″W
- Country: United States
- State: Georgia
- County: Crisp

Government
  - Mayor: Brooke Huckaby (R)

Area
  - Total: 6.44 sq mi (16.69 km^{2})
  - Land: 6.29 sq mi (16.30 km^{2})
  - Water: 0.15 sq mi (0.38 km^{2})
- Elevation: 440 ft (134 m)

Population (2020)
  - Total: 447
  - Density: 71.0/sq mi (27.42/km^{2})
- Time zone: UTC-5 (Eastern (EST))
  - Summer (DST): UTC-4 (EDT)
- ZIP code: 31712
- Area code: 229
- FIPS code: 13-02564
- GNIS feature ID: 0331047
- Website: cityofarabi.com

Arabi is a town in Crisp County, Georgia, United States. As of the 2020 Census, its population was 447.

== History ==
The first permanent settlement at Arabi was made in 1888. According to tradition, the name "Arabi" was coined after a local surname. The town was chartered in 1891.

== Demographics ==
Historical population
Census	Pop.	Note	%±
1900	505		—
1910	433		−14.3%
1920	532		22.9%
1930	452		−15.0%
1940	388		−14.2%
1950	376		−3.1%
1960	303		−19.4%
1970	305		0.7%
1980	376		23.3%
1990	433		15.2%
2000	456		5.3%
2010	586		28.5%
2020	447		−23.7%
U.S. Decennial Census

As of the census of 2000, 456 people, 185 households, and 120 families resided in the town. By the 2020 census, its population was 447.

== Geography ==
Arabi is located in southern Crisp County at 31°50′1″N 83°44′6″W (31.833473, -83.734912). U.S. Route 41 passes through the center of the town as Bedgood Avenue, leading north 9 miles (14 km) to Cordele, the county seat, and south 10 miles (16 km) to Ashburn. Interstate 75 passes through the eastern side of the town, with access from Exit 92, and leads north 73 miles (117 km) to Macon and south 75 miles (121 km) to Valdosta.

According to the United States Census Bureau, Arabi has a total area of 6.4 square miles (16.6 km^{2}), of which 0.12 sq mi (0.3 km^{2}), or 1.81%, is covered by water.

== Notable people ==
- T. Graham Brown, country music singer
- Brooke Huckaby, mayor of Arabi

== See also ==
- List of municipalities in Georgia (U.S. state)
