= Noel Williams Jr. =

American politician and insurance agent from Georgia

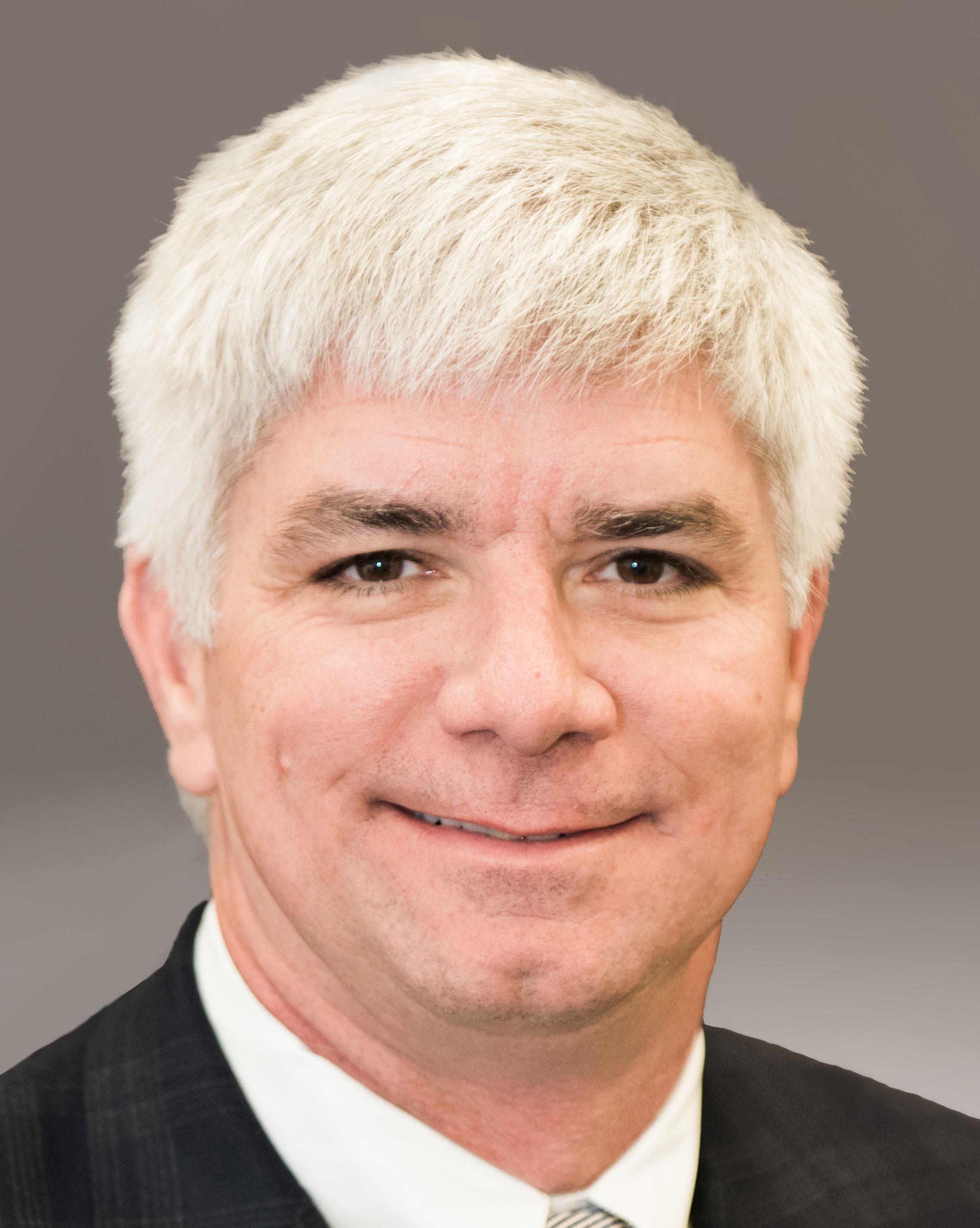
- Official headshot

Member of the Georgia House of Representatives from the 148th district
- Incumbent
- Assumed office January 14, 2019
- Preceded by: Buddy Harden

Personal details
- Born: Noel Warren Williams; January 23, 1972 (age 54)
- Party: Republican
- Spouse: Laura Williams
- Children: 2
- Education: University of Georgia
- Occupation: Insurance agent, politician

Noel Warren Williams (born January 23, 1972) is an American politician and insurance agent from Georgia. Williams is a Republican member of the Georgia House of Representatives for District 148.

== Early life ==
William was born in Georgia, U.S.

== Education ==
In 1994, Williams earned a Political Science degree from University of Georgia.

== Career ==
Williams is an insurance agent.

On November 6, 2018, Williams won the election and became a Republican member of Georgia House of Representatives for District 148. Williams defeated Joshua Deriso with 69.45% of the votes. On November 3, 2020, as an incumbent, Williams won the election and continued serving District 148. Williams defeated Regina Awung with 70.95% of the votes.

== Personal life ==
Williams' wife is Laura Williams. They have two children. In 2002, Williams and his family returned to and live in Cordele, Georgia.

== See also ==
- 2020 Georgia House of Representatives election
