= Stephen Pace (politician) =

American politician

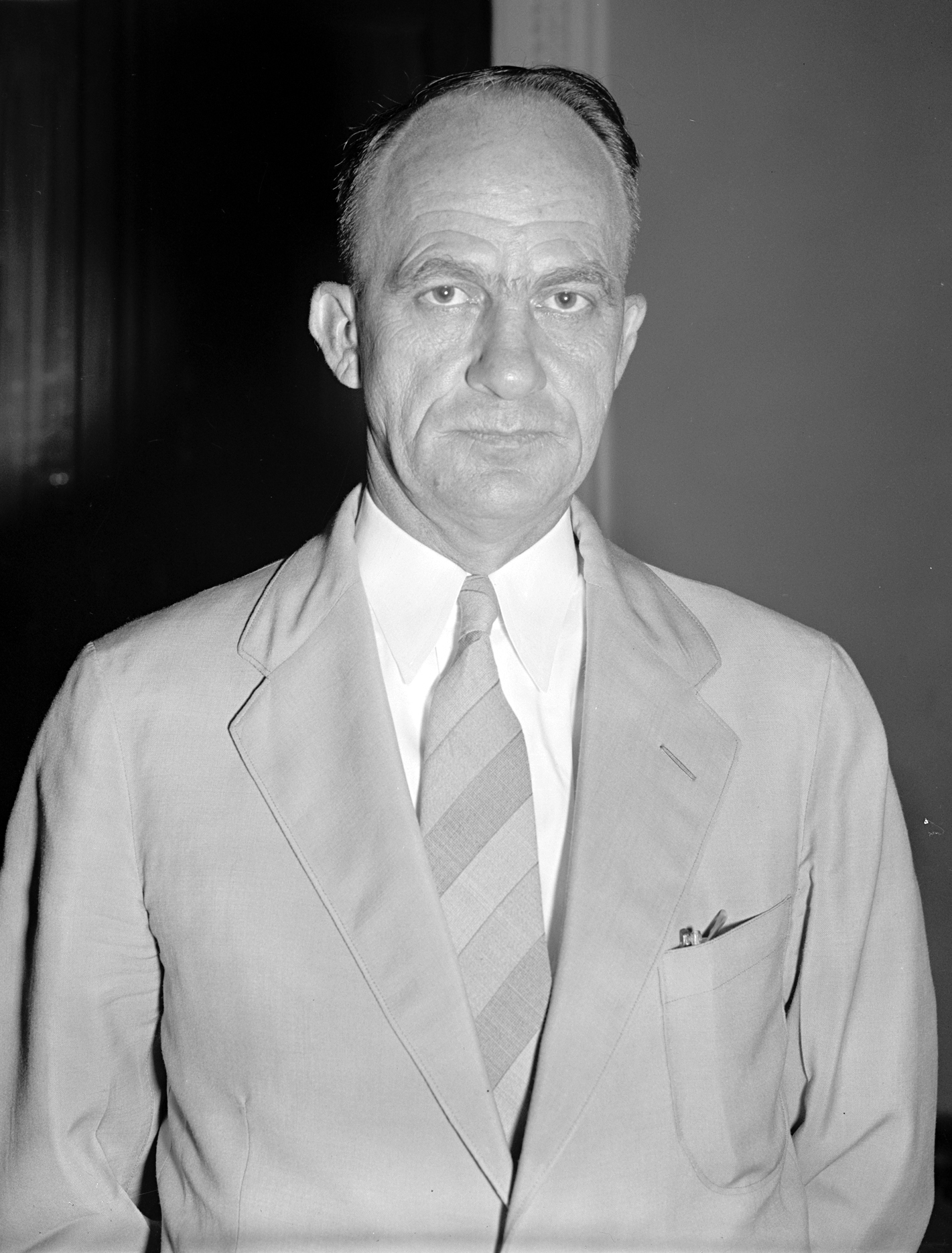

Member of the U.S. House of Representatives from Georgia's 3rd district
- In office January 3, 1937 – January 3, 1951
- Preceded by: Bryant Thomas Castellow
- Succeeded by: Tic Forrester

Member of the Georgia Senate
- In office 1923-1924

Member of the Georgia House of Representatives
- In office 1917-1920

Personal details
- Born: March 9, 1891 near Dawson, Georgia, U.S.
- Died: April 5, 1970 (aged 79) Americus, Georgia, U.S.
- Party: Democratic
- Education: Georgia School of Technology; University of Georgia Law School

Olin Stephen Pace (March 9, 1891 – April 5, 1970) was an American politician and lawyer.

== Early life and education ==
Pace was born near Dawson, Georgia. He attended the Georgia School of Technology in Atlanta, and graduated from the University of Georgia School of Law in Athens in 1914 with a Bachelor of Laws (B.L.) degree. While at UGA, he was a member of the Phi Kappa Literary Society.

== Career ==
After admittance to the state bar in 1914, Pace became a practicing lawyer in Americus, Georgia. From 1917 to 1920, Pace served in the Georgia House of Representatives and then served in the Georgia Senate from 1923 to 1924. In 1936, he won election as a Democrat representing Georgia's 3rd congressional district in the United States House of Representatives during the 75th United States Congress. He was reelected to six additional terms in that seat and served from January 3, 1937, until January 3, 1951. Pace did not run for reelection in 1950 and returned to practicing law in Americus. He died in that city on April 5, 1970, and was buried in its Sunset Memorial Gardens.

U.S. House of Representatives
Preceded by Bryant Thomas Castellow	Member of the U.S. House of Representatives from Georgia's 3rd congressional district January 3, 1937 – January 3, 1951	Succeeded by Elijah Lewis Forrester
