= Tic Forrester =

American politician

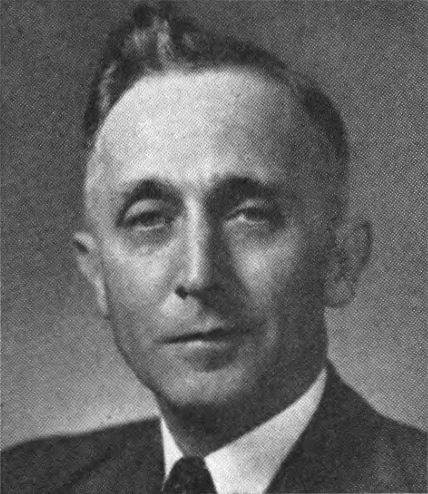

Member of the U.S. House of Representatives from Georgia's 3rd district
- In office January 3, 1951 – January 3, 1965
- Preceded by: Stephen Pace
- Succeeded by: Bo Callaway

Personal details
- Born: August 16, 1896 Leesburg, Georgia, U.S.
- Died: March 19, 1970 (aged 73) Albany, Georgia, U.S.
- Party: Democratic

Elijah Lewis "Tic" Forrester (August 16, 1896 – March 19, 1970) was an American politician. He served as a Democratic member for the 3rd district of Georgia of the United States House of Representatives.

== Early life ==
Born on a farm near Leesburg, Georgia, Tic Forrester attended Leesburg public schools. He then undertook the study of law, passed the State bar examination, at the age of 21, in 1917. With the entry of the United States into the First World War, Forrester enlisted in the United States Army, serving as a private. After his discharge from the Army, Forrester returned to his home town, where he established a law practice, opening his office in 1919.

== Political career ==
From 1920 to 1933 Forrester served as solicitor of the Leesburg City Court. He was elected mayor of the city in 1922; continuing in that office until 1931. Undertaking yet another office, during a period when he served in the two Leesburg positions, Forrester acted as county attorney of Lee County 1928–1937. He then served in the single capacity of Solicitor General, for the Southwestern Judicial Circuit (Georgia) from 1937 to 1950. Forrester was a delegate to the Democratic National Conventions of 1948 and 1952.

Forrester was elected as a Democrat to the Eighty-second and to the six succeeding Congresses (January 3, 1951 – January 3, 1965). A staunch segregationist, in 1956, Forrester signed "The Southern Manifesto".

== Final years ==
Forrester was not a candidate for renomination in 1964 to the Eighty-ninth Congress. He returned to Leesburg and resumed the practice of law. He died in Albany, Georgia, March 19, 1970. He was interred in Leesburg Cemetery, Leesburg, Georgia.

== See also ==
U.S. House of Representatives
Preceded by Stephen Pace	Member of the U.S. House of Representatives from Georgia's 3rd congressional district January 3, 1951 – January 3, 1965	Succeeded by Bo Callaway
