= Taylor Walls =

American baseball player (born 1996)

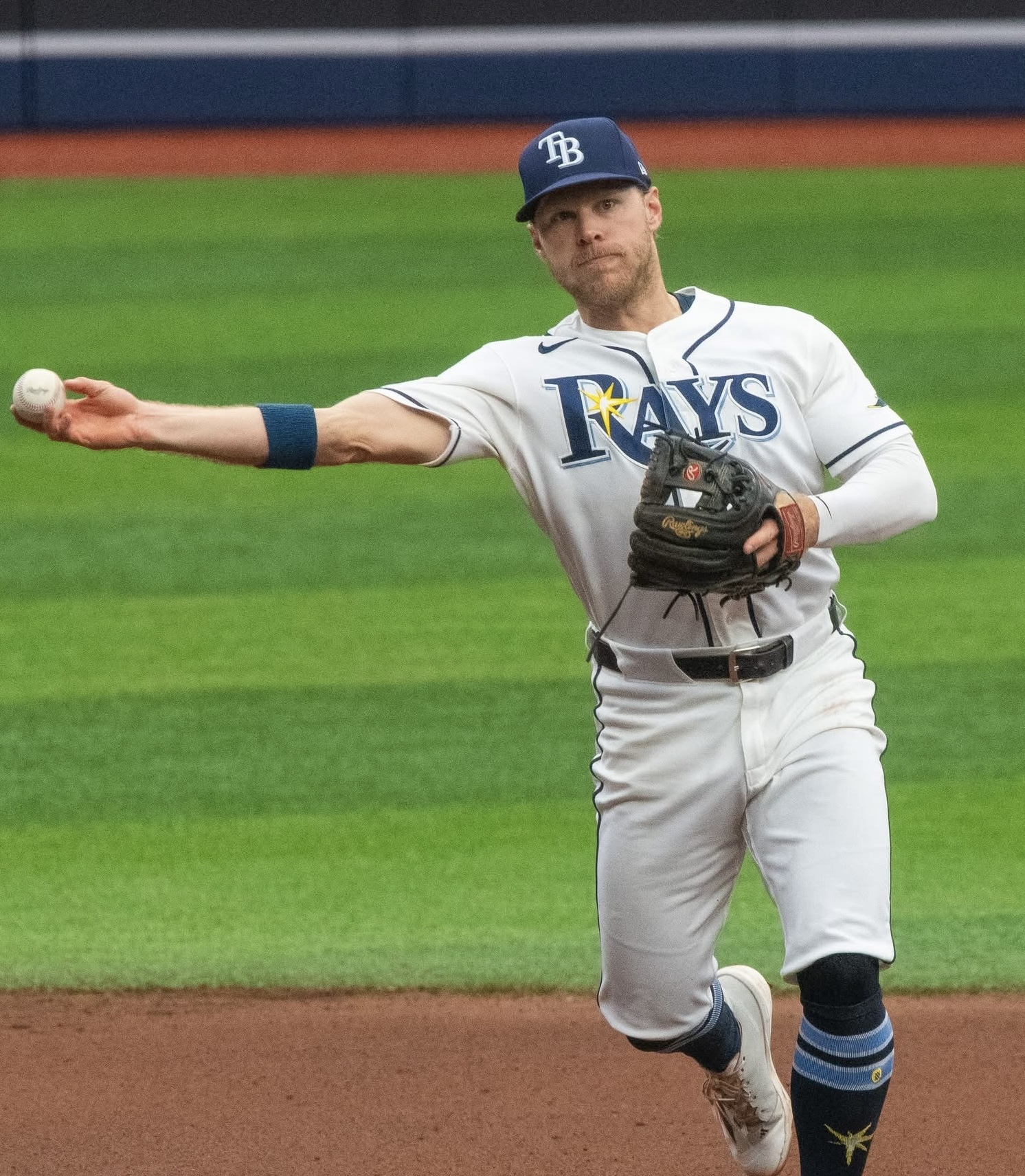
- Walls with the Tampa Bay Rays in 2026

Tampa Bay Rays – No. 6
- Shortstop / Second baseman
- Born: July 10, 1996 (age 30); Cordele, Georgia, U.S.
- Bats: Switch Throws: Right

MLB debut
- May 22, 2021, for the Tampa Bay Rays

MLB statistics (through 2026 season)
- Batting average: .200
- Home runs: 24
- Runs batted in: 172
- Stats at Baseball Reference

Teams
- Tampa Bay Rays (2021–present)

Career highlights and awards
- Gold Glove Award (2026)

Davis Taylor Walls (born July 10, 1996) is an American professional baseball shortstop for the Tampa Bay Rays of Major League Baseball (MLB). He made his MLB debut in 2021.

== Amateur career ==
Walls attended Crisp County High School in Cordele, Georgia, where he played baseball. In 2014, his senior year, he batted over .400 while pitching to a 0.70 earned run average (ERA). Undrafted in the 2014 Major League Baseball draft, Walls enrolled at Florida State University (FSU), where he played college baseball for the Florida State Seminoles.

In 2015, during Walls' freshman year at Florida State, he earned a starting spot, and started all 65 of FSU's games, batting .220 with 22 runs batted in (RBIs) and seven stolen bases. As a sophomore in 2016, Walls slashed .355/.479/.516 with six home runs, 46 RBIs, and 14 stolen bases over 63 starts, earning All-ACC Second Team honors. In 2017, his junior season, Walls started 68 of FSU's 69 games, hitting .273 with eight home runs and 47 RBIs. After the season, Walls was selected by the Tampa Bay Rays in the third round of the 2017 Major League Baseball draft.

== Professional career ==
=== Minor leagues ===
Walls signed with the Rays and made his professional debut with the Hudson Valley Renegades of the Low–A New York–Penn League, batting .213 with one home run over 46 games. In 2018, Walls played with the Bowling Green Hot Rods of the Single–A Midwest League (with whom he earned All-Star honors), slashing .228/.343/.328 with four home runs, 41 RBI, and 7 stolen bases over 147 games. Walls started the 2019 season with the Charlotte Stone Crabs of the High–A Florida State League, being named an All-Star. He missed three weeks during the season due to a quadriceps injury. In June, he was promoted to the Montgomery Biscuits of the Double–A Southern League, with whom he finished the season. Over 96 games between the two clubs, Walls batted .270/.343/.452 with ten home runs, 46 RBI, and 28 stolen bases.

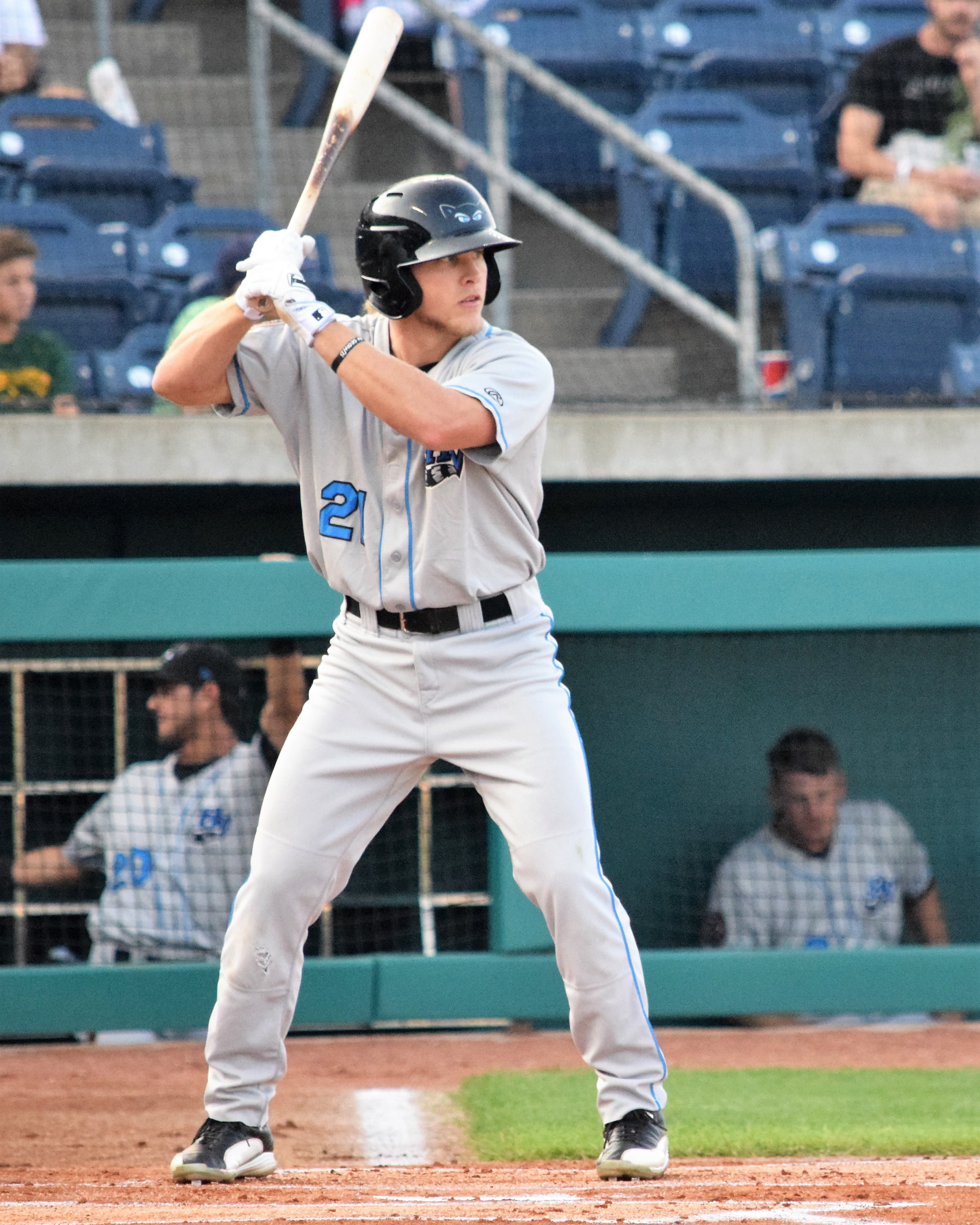
Walls with the Hudson Valley Renegades

Walls did not play in a game in 2020 due to the cancellation of the minor league season because of the COVID-19 pandemic. On November 20, 2020, the Rays added Walls to their 40-man roster to protect him from the Rule 5 draft. To begin the 2021 season, he was assigned to the Durham Bulls of the Triple-A East.

=== Major leagues ===
On May 22, 2021, Walls was promoted to the major leagues for the first time. He made his debut that day and recorded his first MLB hit, a double off Toronto Blue Jays starter Robbie Ray, during the game. Walls missed a brief period during the season with right wrist tendinitis and was placed on the injured list. He played in 54 games for the Rays and ended the season slashing .211/.314/.296 with one home run, 15 RBI, and ten doubles over 152 at-bats.

In 2022, the Rays named Walls to his first ever Opening Day roster. He made 142 appearances for the Rays in 2022, slashing .172/.268/.285 with eight home runs, 33 RBI, and 10 stolen bases. In 2023, Walls played in 99 games for Tampa Bay, hitting .201/.305/.333 with eight home runs, and new career–highs in RBI (36), and stolen bases (22). He missed over a month during the season due to a left oblique strain. Following the season on October 30, Walls underwent hip surgery to relieve discomfort and repair a labrum tear.

Walls began the 2024 season on the injured list as he recovered from surgery, and was transferred to the 60–day injured list on April 20. He was activated from the injured list on June 7. In 2024, Walls played in 84 games for Tampa Bay, hitting .183/.282/.248 with one home run, 14 RBI, and 16 stolen bases.

Walls made 101 appearances for Tampa Bay in 2025, batting .220/.280/.319 with four home runs, a career-high 38 RBI, and 14 stolen bases. On June 1, in an incident which drew much media attention, Walls was ejected by home plate umpire Nic Lentz, after Lentz believed that Wells was tapping his helmet as a protest, following a dubious strike call, in the ninth inning of a 1-0 loss against the Houston Astros. On September 4, 2025, Walls underwent season-ending sports hernia surgery.

Walls began the 2026 season on the injured list with a right oblique strain. He was activated on April 6 for the Rays' home opener. On August 11 against the Athletics, Walls hit his first home run in over a year. He also homered in his next at bat, this time batting right handed. He ended the season having appeared in 124 games and batted .222/.309/.298 with two home runs, 36 RBI, and 21 stolen bases. After the season, Walls was awarded his first ever Gold Glove Award.

== Playing style ==
Walls is regarded as a weak hitter while providing above-average defense. At the same time, he has excelled at the plate in clutch spots.

== Personal life ==
Walls' wife, Hallie, gave birth to their daughter in April 2021. Their second child, a son, was born in September 2023.

In March 2022, Walls retweeted a statement from Ron DeSantis criticizing the NCAA's decision to allow Lia Thomas to compete in women's swimming competitions. Rays manager Kevin Cash said he spoke to Walls about the tweet but Walls told media that he did not think he "did anything wrong ... It’s just my opinion. And feel free to disagree, there’s no harm done. I don’t have any hard feelings towards anyone else. And that’s kind of it."
