= William Washington Larsen Jr. =

American politician (1930–2024)

Member of the Georgia House of Representatives
- In office 1971–1976

Personal details
- Born: August 8, 1930 Laurens County, Georgia, U.S.
- Died: June 27, 2024 (aged 93)
- Party: Democratic
- Relatives: William Washington Larsen (grandfather)
- Education: University of Georgia

William Washington Larsen Jr. (August 8, 1930 – June 27, 2024), also known as W. W. Larsen Jr., was an American politician. He served as a Democratic member of the Georgia House of Representatives.

== Life and career ==
Larsen was born in Laurens County, Georgia. He attended the University of Georgia and served in the United States Army.

Larsen served in the Georgia House of Representatives from 1971 to 1976.

Larsen died on June 27, 2024, at the age of 93.
