= Charles F. Crisp =

American politician (1845–1896)

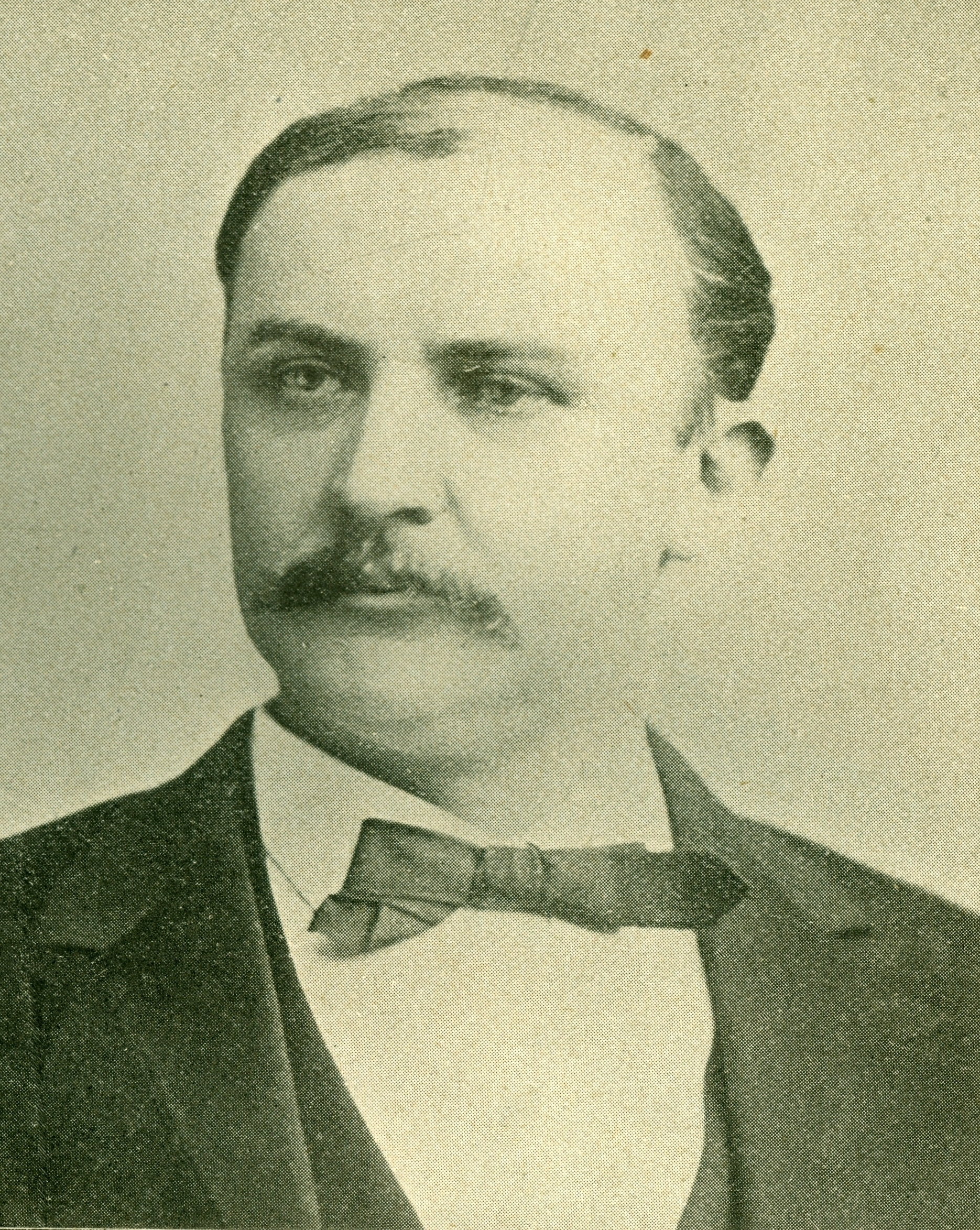

33rd Speaker of the United States House of Representatives
- In office December 8, 1891 – March 4, 1895
- Preceded by: Thomas B. Reed
- Succeeded by: Thomas B. Reed

Leader of the House Democratic Caucus
- In office December 8, 1891 – March 4, 1895
- Preceded by: John G. Carlisle
- Succeeded by: James D. Richardson

Member of the U.S. House of Representatives from Georgia's 3rd district
- In office March 4, 1883 – October 23, 1896
- Preceded by: Philip Cook
- Succeeded by: Charles R. Crisp

Personal details
- Born: Charles Frederick Crisp; January 29, 1845 Sheffield, England, United Kingdom
- Died: October 23, 1896 (aged 51) Atlanta, Georgia, U.S.
- Party: Democratic
- Spouse: Clara Bell Burton
- Children: Charles R. Crisp
- Profession: Law

Military service
- Allegiance: Confederate States of America
- Branch/service: Confederate States Army
- Years of service: 1861–1865
- Rank: Lieutenant
- Unit: 10th Virginia Infantry Regiment
- Battles/wars: American Civil War; Battle of Spotsylvania

Charles Frederick Crisp (January 29, 1845 – October 23, 1896) was a British-American politician and Confederate Army officer. A member of the Democratic Party, Crisp was elected as a congressman from Georgia in 1882, and served until his death in 1896. From 1890 to 1895, he led the Democratic Party in the House, as either the speaker of the House or House minority leader. He was the father of Charles R. Crisp who also served in Congress.

== Biography ==
Crisp was born in Sheffield, England, on January 29, 1845. Later that year, his parents immigrated to the United States and settled in Georgia where he attended the common schools of Savannah and Macon, Georgia. At the outbreak of the American Civil War, he was temporarily residing in Luray, Virginia, with his parents, who were in the middle of a Shakespearean play tour.

He enlisted in a local unit, the "Page Volunteers" of Company K, 10th Virginia Infantry, and was commissioned lieutenant. He served with that regiment until May 12, 1864, when he became a prisoner of war at the Battle of Spotsylvania Court House. He was held as one of the Immortal Six Hundred at Fort Pulaski, Georgia, and later transferred to Fort Delaware. After his release in June 1865, he joined his parents at Ellaville, Georgia.

Crisp studied law at Americus, Georgia. He was admitted to the bar in 1866 and commenced practice in Ellaville. He was appointed solicitor general of the southwestern judicial circuit in 1872 and reappointed in 1873 for a term of four years. In June 1877, he was appointed judge of the superior court of the same circuit. Crisp was elected by the general assembly to the same office in 1878 and reelected judge for a term of four years in 1880 when he resigned that office in September 1882 to accept the Democratic Party's nomination for the United States Congress.

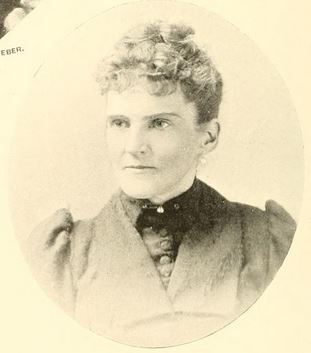
Clara Bell Burton

Crisp courted Clara Bell Burton, born in Ellaville, a small town in southwest Georgia, of wealthy and religious parentage. Her father, Robert Burton, was a slave-owning cotton planter before the war. Both he and her mother held high ambitions for their two daughters' future, and they were chagrined when Crisp, then a poor lawyer from a theatrical family, desired to marry their youngest daughter, Clara Bell. They were greatly disappointed when they discovered that her affections had been won. Mrs. Burton, especially, felt that her beautiful daughter ought to be more ambitious in marriage. Crisp followed protocol and wrote a formal request to Mr. Burton. In later years, after Crisp had achieved distinction, Burton declared that his son-in-law had never written anything better. But at the time it was to no effect. Crisp requested that a friend ask Mr. Burton if they might be married at her home. Her parents refused, so they had to make other plans. Clara Bell's sister Ella assisted with her trousseau. One bright Sunday morning, when she was visiting her brother on the outskirts of Ellaville, Crisp drove Clara Bell in his buggy to his boarding place, and there in the presence of a few friends in the parlor, they were married. The next Sunday, Crisp and his wife joined the Methodist Church of Ellaville. Soon Clara Bell's parents reconciled with the couple, and he became the mainstay of their old age. They lived fifty-one years in the same house. Clara Bell, on her death-bed, said: "I cannot think what my life would have been without him... My father and mother came to love him very much. He has been the dearest, sweetest husband to me, and I have loved him better than anything else on earth."

Crisp served as president of the Democratic gubernatorial convention at Atlanta, Georgia, in April 1883. he was elected a Democrat to the Forty-eighth and to the six succeeding Congresses and served from March 4, 1883, until his death. In Congress, he served as chairman of the Committee on Elections in the Fiftieth Congress, Committee on Rules in the Fifty-second and Fifty-third Congresses, and Speaker of the House of Representatives in the Fifty-second and Fifty-third Congresses. He had been nominated for United States Senator in the Georgia primary of 1896, but he died in Atlanta on October 23, 1896, and was buried in Oak Grove Cemetery in his hometown of Americus. Georgia's Crisp County is named in his honor.

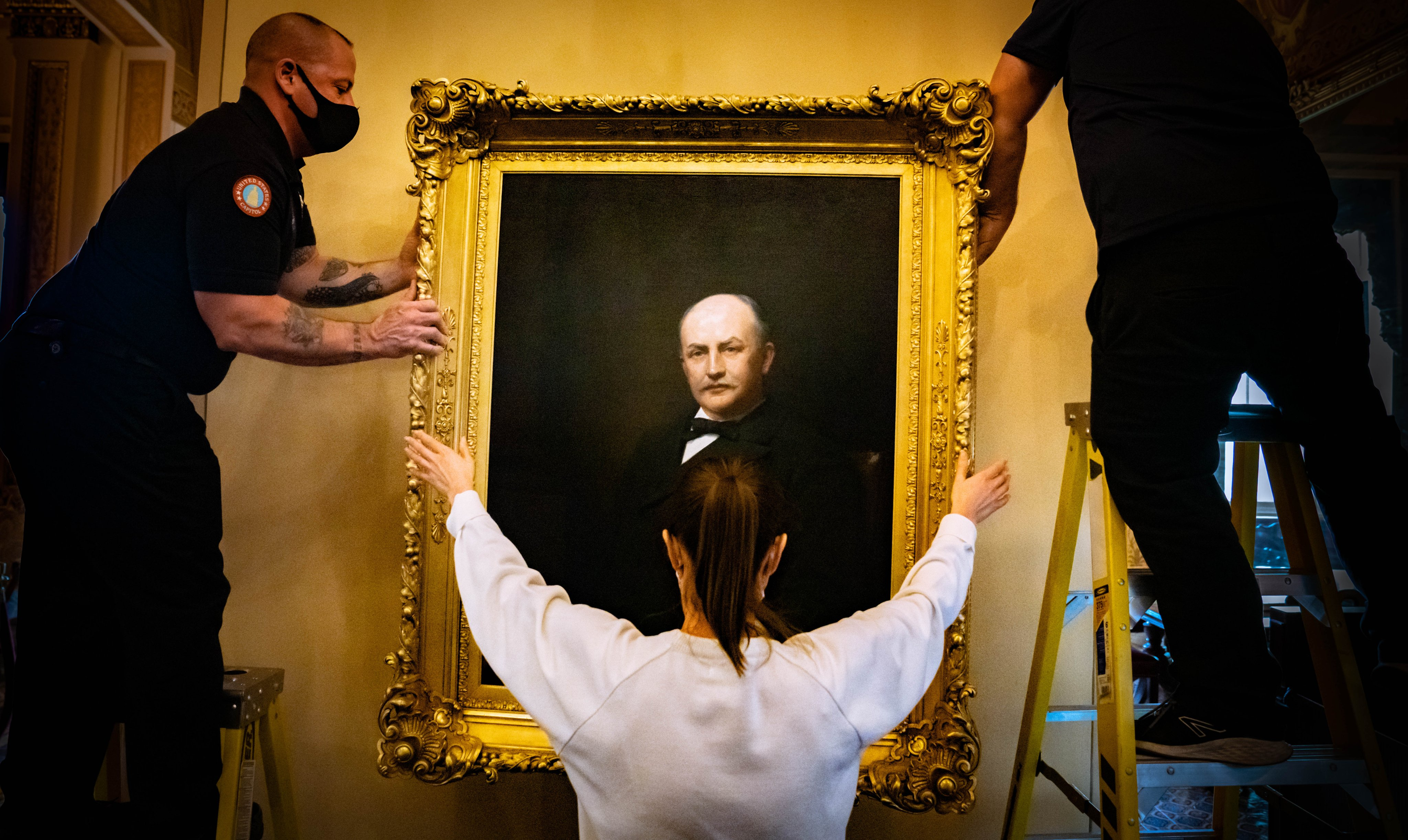
The removal of Crisp's portrait from the US Capitol in June 2020.

== Legacy ==
As a former Speaker of the House, his portrait had been on display in the US Capitol. The portrait was removed from public display in the Speaker's Lobby outside the House Chamber after an order issued by the Speaker of the House, Nancy Pelosi on June 18, 2020, due to Crisp having fought in the Confederate States Army.

== See also ==
- List of members of the United States Congress who died in office (1790–1899)

== Notes ==
U.S. House of Representatives
Preceded by Philip Cook	Member of the U.S. House of Representatives from Georgia's 3rd congressional district March 4, 1883 – October 23, 1896	Succeeded by Charles R. Crisp
Political offices
Preceded by Thomas B. Reed	Speaker of the U.S. House of Representatives; December 8, 1891 – March 4, 1893; August 7, 1893 – March 4, 1895	Succeeded by Thomas B. Reed
