= Spalding, Georgia =

Unincorporated community in Georgia, U.S.

Coordinates: 32°17′36″N 83°59′52″W

Spalding is an unincorporated community in Macon County, in the U.S. state of Georgia.

== History ==
A post office called Spalding was established 1895, and remained in operation until 1904.

The Georgia General Assembly incorporated Spalding as a town in 1869. The town's municipal charter was repealed in 1958.
