= Coney, Georgia =

Unincorporated community in Georgia, U.S.

Coordinates: 31°57′22″N 83°53′02″W

Coney is an unincorporated community in Crisp County, in the U.S. state of Georgia.

== History ==
An old variant name was "Gum Creek." The Georgia General Assembly incorporated the place as the "Town of Coney" in 1889. The present name most likely is after S. W. Coney, a local judge. A post office called Gum Creek was established in 1851, the name was changed to Coney in 1888, and the post office closed in 1915. By 1900, Coney had 77 inhabitants. The town's municipal charter was dissolved in 1995.
