= Quay Walker =

American football player (born 2000)

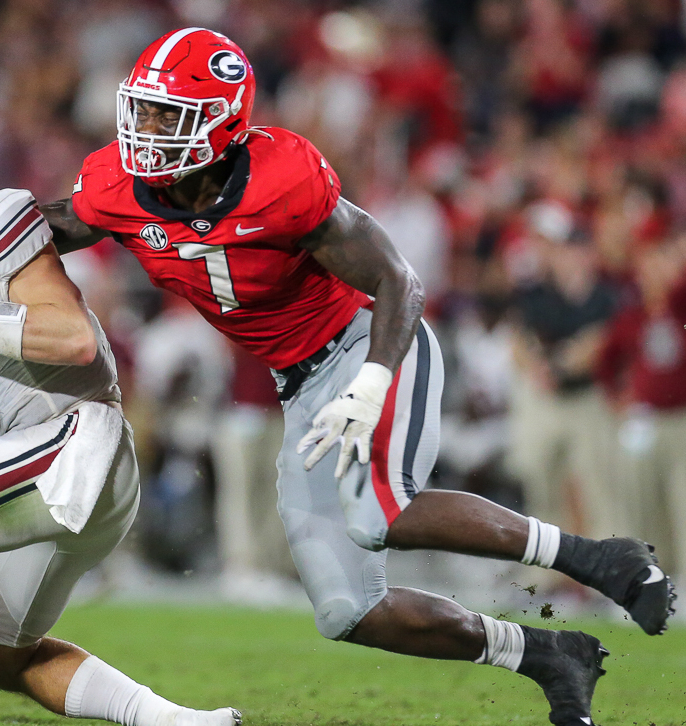
- Walker with the Georgia Bulldogs in 2021

No. 7 – Las Vegas Raiders
- Position: Linebacker
- Roster status: Active

Personal information
- Born: May 8, 2000 (age 26); Cordele, Georgia, U.S.
- Listed height: 6 ft 4 in (1.93 m)
- Listed weight: 240 lb (109 kg)

Career information
- High school: Crisp County (Cordele)
- College: Georgia (2018–2021)
- NFL draft: 2022: 1st round, 22nd overall pick

Career history
- Green Bay Packers (2022–2025); Las Vegas Raiders (2026–present)

Awards and highlights
- PFWA All-Rookie Team (2022); CFP national champion (2021)

Career NFL statistics as of Week 10, 2026
- Total tackles: 549
- Sacks: 11.0
- Forced fumbles: 3
- Fumble recoveries: 3
- Pass deflections: 17
- Interceptions: 1
- Defensive touchdowns: 1
- Stats at Pro Football Reference

JaQuavian Jy'Quese "Quay" Walker (born May 8, 2000) is an American professional football linebacker for the Las Vegas Raiders of the National Football League (NFL). He played college football for the Georgia Bulldogs and was selected by the Green Bay Packers in the first round of the 2022 NFL draft.

== Early life ==
Walker was born on May 8, 2000, in Cordele, Georgia. He attended Crisp County High School, where he had 109 tackles, eight sacks, and an interception as a junior. Walker was rated a four-star recruit and initially committed to play college football for the Alabama Crimson Tide before his senior year in 2017, but changed to Georgia in early 2018.

== College career ==
Walker played in all 14 of Georgia's games during his freshman season and had six total tackles. He saw increased playing time as a sophomore and finished the season with 23 tackles, 3.5 tackles for loss, and 2.5 sacks. Walker finished as Georgia's fourth-leading tackler with 43 in his junior season.

== Professional career ==
Pre-draft measurables
Height	Weight	Arm length	Hand span	Wingspan	40-yard dash	10-yard split	20-yard split	20-yard shuttle	Three-cone drill	Vertical jump	Broad jump	Bench press
6 ft 3 3/4 in (1.92 m)	241 lb (109 kg)	32 5/8 in (0.83 m)	9 1/4 in (0.23 m)	6 ft 7 7/8 in (2.03 m)	4.52 s	1.58 s	2.64 s	4.32 s	6.89 s	32.0 in (0.81 m)	10 ft 2 in (3.10 m)	23 reps
All values from NFL Combine/Pro Day

=== Green Bay Packers ===
==== 2022 ====
Walker was selected by the Green Bay Packers in the first round (22nd overall) of the 2022 NFL draft. The Packers previously acquired the pick in a trade that sent Davante Adams to the Las Vegas Raiders. On May 6, 2022, he signed his rookie contract.

Walker was ejected in Week 8 against the Buffalo Bills after an altercation with the Bills' coaching staff, following a play where Walker made a tackle on Buffalo's sideline. In Week 12, during a 40–33 loss to the Philadelphia Eagles, Walker scooped up a fumble forced by teammate Rudy Ford on Eagles wide receiver A. J. Brown and returned it 63 yards to put the Packers in scoring position. Walker was ejected for the second time in Week 18 against the Detroit Lions after shoving a member of the Lions' medical staff, becoming the only player since the 2000 NFL season to be ejected more than once in a single season.

Walker played all 17 games in his rookie campaign, finishing the season with a team-high 121 total tackles (75 solo, 46 assisted). He also recorded a team-high three forced fumbles, as well as 1.5 sacks, five tackles for loss and one fumble recovery. For his efforts, he was named to the 2022 PFWA All-Rookie Team.

==== 2023 ====
In Week 1 of the 2023 season, during a 38–20 win over the Chicago Bears, Walker intercepted a pass from Justin Fields and returned it 37 yards for his first NFL touchdown. Walker finished the season with 14 appearances and starts, recording 2.5 sacks, 118 tackles, one interception, and three passes defended.

==== 2025 ====
On May 1, 2025, the Packers declined the fifth-year option in Walker's contract, making him a free agent in 2026.

=== Las Vegas Raiders ===
On March 12, 2026, the Las Vegas Raiders signed Walker to a four-year, $40.5 million contract with $28 million guaranteed.

== NFL career statistics ==
=== Regular season ===
Year	Team	Games		Tackles						Interceptions						Fumbles			
Year	Team	GP	GS	Cmb	Solo	Ast	Sck	TFL	Sfty	PD	Int	Yds	Avg	Lng	TD	FF	FR	Yds	TD
2022	GB	17	16	121	75	46	1.5	5	0	7	0	0	0.0	0	0	3	1	63	0
2023	GB	14	14	118	59	59	2.5	7	0	3	1	37	37.0	37	1	0	0	0	0
2024	GB	13	13	102	72	30	2.5	9	0	2	0	0	0.0	0	0	0	0	0	0
2025	GB	14	14	128	58	70	2.5	8	0	5	0	0	0.0	0	0	0	0	0	0
2026	LVR	10	10	80	32	48	2.0	7	0	0	0	0	0.0	0	0	0	2	0	0
Total		68	67	549	296	253	11.0	36	0	17	1	37	37.0	37	1	3	3	63	0
Source: pro-football-reference.com

=== Postseason ===
Year	Team	Games		Tackles						Interceptions						Fumbles			
Year	Team	GP	GS	Cmb	Solo	Ast	Sck	TFL	Sfty	PD	Int	Yds	Avg	Lng	TD	FF	FR	Yds	TD
2023	GB	2	2	20	9	11	0.0	1	0	0	0	0	0.0	0	0	0	0	0	0
2024	GB	1	1	8	4	4	0.0	0	0	0	0	0	0.0	0	0	0	0	0	0
2025	GB	1	1	6	3	3	0.0	1	0	2	0	0	0.0	0	0	0	0	0	0
Total		4	4	34	16	18	0.0	2	0	2	0	0	0.0	0	0	0	0	0	0
Source: pro-football-reference.com
