= Crisp County, Georgia =

County in Georgia, United States

- County
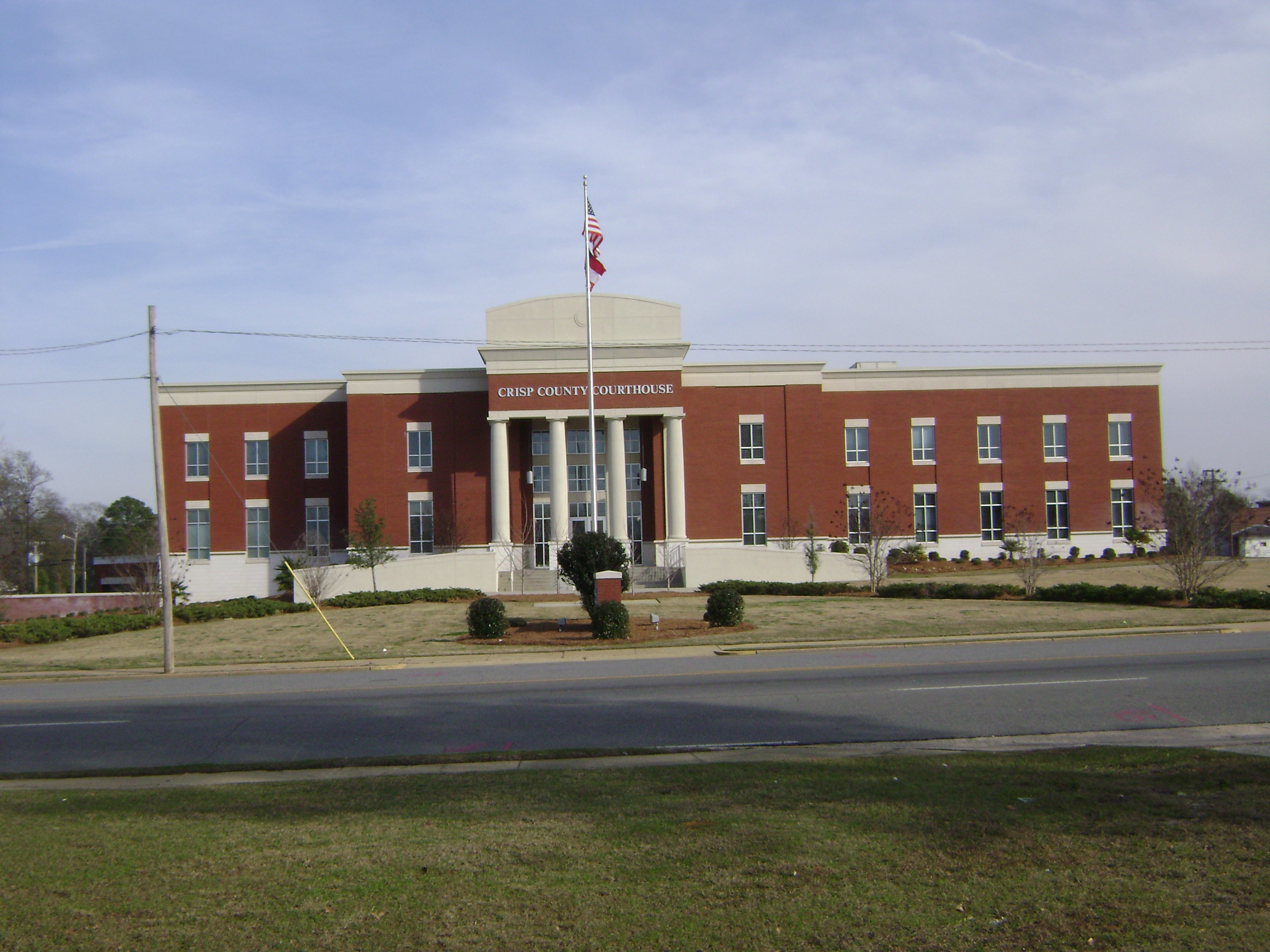
- Crisp County Courthouse in Cordele

- Location within the U.S. state of Georgia
- Coordinates: 31°56′N 83°46′W
- Country: United States
- State: Georgia
- Founded: 1905; 121 years ago
- Named for: Charles Frederick Crisp
- Seat: Cordele
- Largest city: Cordele

Area
  - Total: 281 sq mi (730 km^{2})
  - Land: 273 sq mi (710 km^{2})
  - Water: 8.4 sq mi (22 km^{2}) 3.0%

Population (2020)
  - Total: 20,128
  - Estimate (2025): 19,237 ▼
  - Density: 74/sq mi (29/km^{2})
- Time zone: UTC−5 (Eastern)
  - Summer (DST): UTC−4 (EDT)
- Congressional district: 2nd
- Website: www.crispcounty.com

Crisp County is a county located in the central portion of the U.S. state of Georgia. As of the 2020 census, the population was 20,128. The county seat is Cordele. The county was created on August 17, 1905, from Dooly County and named for Georgia Congressman Charles Frederick Crisp.

Crisp County comprises the Cordele, GA micropolitan statistical area.

== Geography ==
According to the U.S. Census Bureau, the county has a total area of 281 square miles (730 km^{2}), of which 273 square miles (710 km^{2}) is land and 8.4 square miles (22 km^{2}) (3.0%) is water.

The western two-thirds of Crisp County, bordered on the east by a line from south of Arabi running northeast, is located in the Middle Flint River sub-basin of the ACF River Basin (Apalachicola-Chattahoochee-Flint River Basin). The eastern third of the county is located in the Alapaha River sub-basin of the Suwannee River.

=== Major highways ===
- Interstate 75 / State Route 401 (unsigned)
- U.S. Route 41 / State Route 7
- U.S. Route 280 / State Route 30
- State Route 33
  - State Route 33 Connector
- State Route 90
- State Route 257
- State Route 300
  - State Route 300 Connector

=== Adjacent counties ===
- Dooly County (north)
- Wilcox County (east)
- Turner County (southeast)
- Worth County (southwest)
- Lee County (west)
- Sumter County (west)

== Communities ==
=== City ===
- Cordele (county seat)

=== Town ===
- Arabi

=== Census-designated place ===
- Wenona

=== Unincorporated territory ===
- Coney

== Demographics ==
Historical population
Census	Pop.	Note	%±
1910	16,423		—
1920	18,914		15.2%
1930	17,343		−8.3%
1940	17,540		1.1%
1950	17,663		0.7%
1960	17,768		0.6%
1970	18,087		1.8%
1980	19,489		7.8%
1990	20,011		2.7%
2000	21,996		9.9%
2010	23,439		6.6%
2020	20,128		−14.1%
2025 (est.)	19,237	▼	−4.4%
U.S. Decennial Census; 1790-1880 1890-1910; 1920-1930 1930-1940; 1940-1950 1960-1980; 1980-2000 2010

=== Racial and ethnic composition ===
Crisp County, Georgia – Racial and ethnic composition Note: the US Census treats Hispanic/Latino as an ethnic category. This table excludes Latinos from the racial categories and assigns them to a separate category. Hispanics/Latinos may be of any race.
Race / Ethnicity (NH = Non-Hispanic)	Pop 1980	Pop 1990	Pop 2000	Pop 2010	Pop 2020	% 1980	% 1990	% 2000	% 2010	% 2020
White alone (NH)	11,717	11,742	11,778	12,216	9,892	60.12%	58.68%	53.55%	52.12%	49.15%
Black or African American alone (NH)	7,520	8,137	9,511	10,033	8,821	38.59%	40.66%	43.24%	42.80%	43.82%
Native American or Alaska Native alone (NH)	19	36	28	24	18	0.10%	0.18%	0.13%	0.10%	0.09%
Asian alone (NH)	37	27	148	183	180	0.19%	0.13%	0.67%	0.78%	0.89%
Native Hawaiian or Pacific Islander alone (NH)	x	x	7	6	4	x	x	0.03%	0.03%	0.02%
Other race alone (NH)	4	7	17	15	64	0.02%	0.03%	0.08%	0.06%	0.32%
Mixed race or Multiracial (NH)	x	x	125	214	515	x	x	0.57%	0.91%	2.56%
Hispanic or Latino (any race)	192	62	382	748	634	0.99%	0.31%	1.74%	3.19%	3.15%
Total	19,489	20,011	21,996	23,439	20,128	100.00%	100.00%	100.00%	100.00%	100.00%

=== 2020 census ===
As of the 2020 census, the county had a population of 20,128, 8,346 households, and 5,712 families. The median age was 41.9 years. 22.6% of residents were under the age of 18 and 19.8% of residents were 65 years of age or older. For every 100 females there were 89.7 males, and for every 100 females age 18 and over there were 86.6 males age 18 and over. 54.3% of residents lived in urban areas, while 45.7% lived in rural areas.

The racial makeup of the county was 49.7% White, 44.1% Black or African American, 0.2% American Indian and Alaska Native, 0.9% Asian, 0.0% Native Hawaiian and Pacific Islander, 1.9% from some other race, and 3.2% from two or more races. Hispanic or Latino residents of any race comprised 3.1% of the population.

Of the households, 28.9% had children under the age of 18 living with them and 37.8% had a female householder with no spouse or partner present. About 32.4% of all households were made up of individuals and 14.1% had someone living alone who was 65 years of age or older.

There were 9,854 housing units, of which 15.3% were vacant. Among occupied housing units, 55.8% were owner-occupied and 44.2% were renter-occupied. The homeowner vacancy rate was 2.0% and the rental vacancy rate was 6.0%.

== Politics ==
As of the 2020s, Crisp County is a strongly Republican voting county, voting 62.83% for Donald Trump in 2024. For elections to the United States House of Representatives, Crisp County is part of Georgia's 8th congressional district, currently represented by Austin Scott. For elections to the Georgia State Senate, Crisp County is part of District 13. For elections to the Georgia House of Representatives, Crisp County is part of District 148.

United States presidential election results for Crisp County, Georgia
Year	Republican		Democratic		Third party(ies)	
Year	No.	%	No.	%	No.	%
1912	45	6.42%	644	91.87%	12	1.71%
1916	100	14.68%	577	84.73%	4	0.59%
1920	83	12.81%	565	87.19%	0	0.00%
1924	21	4.41%	439	92.23%	16	3.36%
1928	402	43.46%	523	56.54%	0	0.00%
1932	10	1.35%	725	97.97%	5	0.68%
1936	79	7.12%	1,029	92.70%	2	0.18%
1940	129	10.91%	1,049	88.75%	4	0.34%
1944	217	15.32%	1,199	84.68%	0	0.00%
1948	221	11.22%	1,225	62.18%	524	26.60%
1952	949	30.96%	2,116	69.04%	0	0.00%
1956	835	24.84%	2,526	75.16%	0	0.00%
1960	963	28.94%	2,365	71.06%	0	0.00%
1964	3,337	65.52%	1,756	34.48%	0	0.00%
1968	935	17.90%	1,017	19.47%	3,271	62.63%
1972	3,623	84.16%	682	15.84%	0	0.00%
1976	1,328	26.17%	3,747	73.83%	0	0.00%
1980	1,861	34.80%	3,403	63.64%	83	1.55%
1984	2,895	57.63%	2,128	42.37%	0	0.00%
1988	2,916	62.94%	1,690	36.48%	27	0.58%
1992	2,253	39.46%	2,610	45.72%	846	14.82%
1996	2,321	43.83%	2,504	47.28%	471	8.89%
2000	3,285	58.57%	2,268	40.44%	56	1.00%
2004	3,865	61.80%	2,357	37.69%	32	0.51%
2008	4,424	58.56%	3,085	40.84%	45	0.60%
2012	4,182	56.51%	3,167	42.80%	51	0.69%
2016	4,549	60.26%	2,837	37.58%	163	2.16%
2020	4,985	62.03%	2,982	37.11%	69	0.86%
2024	5,099	62.83%	2,993	36.88%	24	0.30%

United States Senate election results for Crisp County, Georgia2
Year	Republican		Democratic		Third party(ies)	
Year	No.	%	No.	%	No.	%
2020	5,054	63.33%	2,809	35.20%	117	1.47%
2020	4,454	62.42%	2,681	37.58%	0	0.00%

United States Senate election results for Crisp County, Georgia3
Year	Republican		Democratic		Third party(ies)	
Year	No.	%	No.	%	No.	%
2020	2,330	29.55%	1,738	22.04%	3,817	48.41%
2020	4,436	62.15%	2,702	37.85%	0	0.00%
2022	4,058	64.35%	2,164	34.32%	84	1.33%
2022	3,732	64.71%	2,035	35.29%	0	0.00%

Georgia Gubernatorial election results for Crisp County
Year	Republican		Democratic		Third party(ies)	
Year	No.	%	No.	%	No.	%
2022	4,296	67.95%	2,013	31.84%	13	0.21%

== See also ==
- National Register of Historic Places listings in Crisp County, Georgia
- List of counties in Georgia
