= Cordele, Georgia =

- City
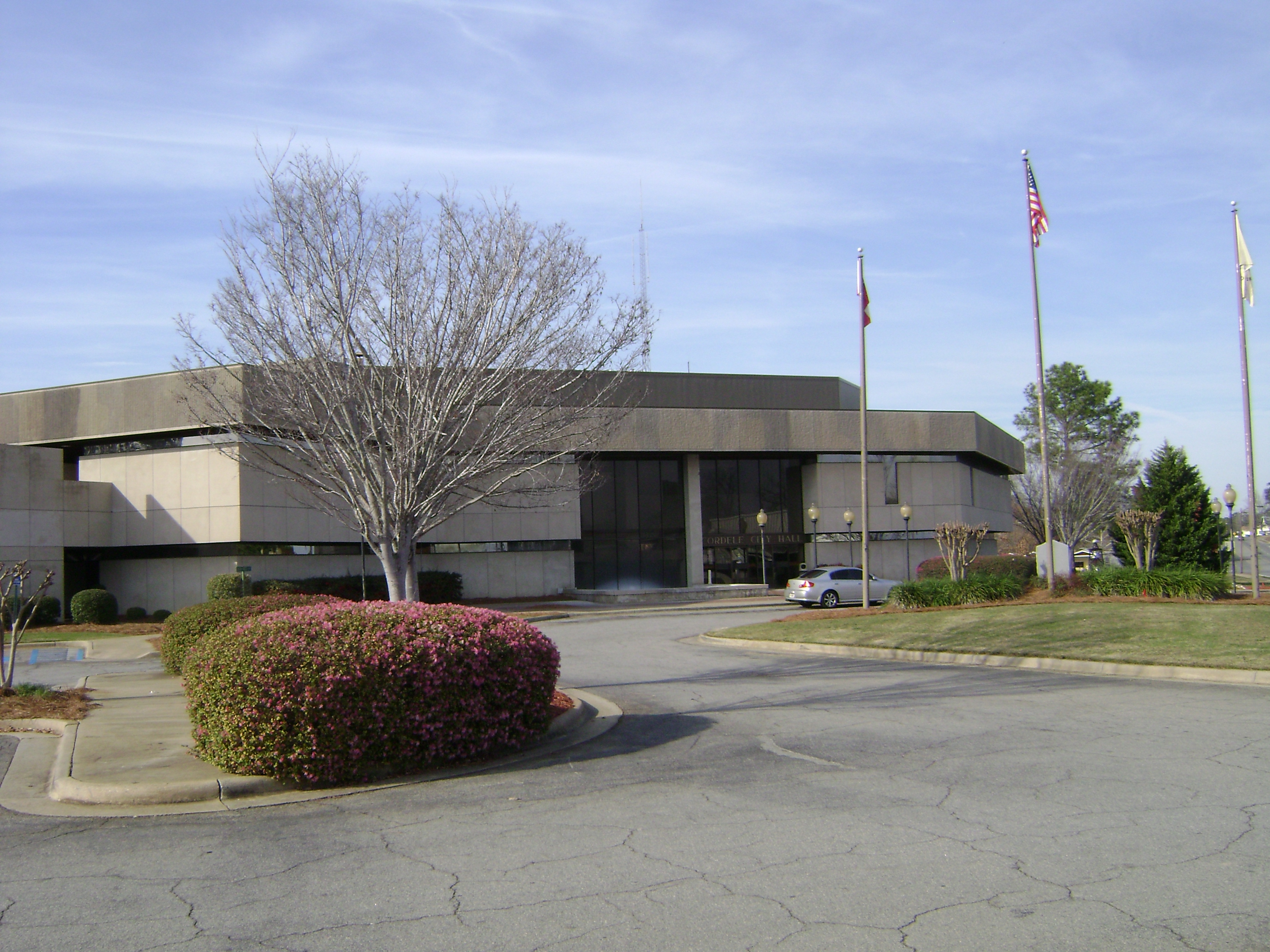
- Cordele City Hall

- Flag Logo
- Nickname: Watermelon Capital of the World
- Motto: Gateway to South Georgia
- Location of Cordele in Georgia (left) and in Crisp County, Georgia (right)
- Coordinates: 31°57′51″N 83°46′38″W
- Country: United States
- State: Georgia
- County: Crisp

Area
  - Total: 10.51 sq mi (27.21 km^{2})
  - Land: 10.42 sq mi (26.99 km^{2})
  - Water: 0.085 sq mi (0.22 km^{2})
- Elevation: 315 ft (96 m)

Population (2020)
  - Total: 10,220
  - Density: 980.6/sq mi (378.61/km^{2})
- Time zone: UTC-5 (Eastern (EST))
  - Summer (DST): UTC-4 (EDT)
- ZIP Codes: 31010, 31015
- Area code: 229
- FIPS code: 13-19616
- GNIS feature ID: 0312971
- Website: www.cityofcordele.com

Cordele is a city in and the county seat of Crisp County, Georgia, United States. The population was 11,165 at the 2010 census, and 10,220 in 2020.

Cordele calls itself the watermelon capital of the world. The city is approximately halfway between Macon and Valdosta on interstate 75 in Georgia

== History ==
=== 19th century ===
Cordele was incorporated on January 1, 1888, and named for Cordelia Hawkins, eldest daughter of Colonel Samuel Hawkins, the president of the Savannah, Americus and Montgomery Railway.

In November 1864, the area that is now Cordele served as the temporary capital of Georgia. During the last days of the Confederacy, Georgia's war governor Joseph E. Brown used his rural farmhouse to escape Sherman's March to the Sea. During that time, the farmhouse, which Brown called "Dooly County Place," served as the official capital for only a few days. It was replaced in 1890 by the Suwanee Hotel, located in what became downtown Cordele. The hotel was destroyed by a fire in late 1994 and was rebuilt.

Cordele was founded in 1888 by J.E.D. Shipp of Americus. The town was located at the junction of two major railroads – the Savannah, Americus & Montgomery line, and the Georgia Southern & Florida. As the railroads brought more people and business to the newly settled territory, Cordele experienced phenomenal growth. Before 1905 Cordele was located in southern Dooly County, 9 miles (14 km) from the county seat in Vienna.

=== 20th century ===
With Cordele's continued progress, many in the community felt the need for a seat of government to be closer than Vienna. Crisp County was formed in 1905 by taking a portion of southern Dooly County, and Cordele became its county seat.

By 1915, Cordele was home to several industries including an ice-making plant, mills for processing cotton products into cloth and oil, a fertilizer factory, and other small manufacturing outfits.

By August 1930, Cordele housed the Crisp County Hydroelectric System, the first county-owned electric system. Located on the Flint River, the hydroelectric plant continues to operate, and the resulting Lake Blackshear has attracted residents to its waterfront properties.

On April 2, 1936, a tornado struck Cordele, killing 23 people.

== Geography ==
Cordele is located north of the center of Crisp County.

According to the U.S. Census Bureau, Cordele has a total area of 10.2 square miles (26.5 km^{2}), of which 10.2 square miles (26.3 km^{2}) is land and 0.077 square miles (0.2 km^{2}), or 0.82%, is water.

=== Climate ===
Cordele has a humid subtropical climate (Köppen climate classification Cfa), with mild winters and hot, humid summers.

Climate data for Cordele, Georgia (1991-2020 normals, extremes 1892–present)
Month	Jan	Feb	Mar	Apr	May	Jun	Jul	Aug	Sep	Oct	Nov	Dec	Year
Record high °F (°C)	84 (29)	85 (29)	90 (32)	96 (36)	100 (38)	106 (41)	104 (40)	104 (40)	101 (38)	99 (37)	89 (32)	83 (28)	106 (41)
Mean daily maximum °F (°C)	59.1 (15.1)	63.3 (17.4)	70.7 (21.5)	78.4 (25.8)	85.9 (29.9)	90.8 (32.7)	93.0 (33.9)	91.6 (33.1)	87.0 (30.6)	78.6 (25.9)	68.6 (20.3)	60.7 (15.9)	77.3 (25.2)
Mean daily minimum °F (°C)	36.5 (2.5)	39.5 (4.2)	45.6 (7.6)	53.0 (11.7)	61.7 (16.5)	69.2 (20.7)	71.7 (22.1)	70.9 (21.6)	65.6 (18.7)	54.5 (12.5)	43.8 (6.6)	38.7 (3.7)	54.2 (12.4)
Record low °F (°C)	−3 (−19)	9 (−13)	15 (−9)	30 (−1)	36 (2)	45 (7)	57 (14)	56 (13)	37 (3)	27 (−3)	9 (−13)	8 (−13)	−3 (−19)
Average rainfall inches (mm)	4.67 (119)	4.33 (110)	4.88 (124)	4.39 (112)	2.98 (76)	4.86 (123)	4.54 (115)	4.09 (104)	4.54 (115)	2.61 (66)	3.20 (81)	5.04 (128)	50.13 (1,273)
Source: NOAA

== Demographics ==
Historical population
Census	Pop.	Note	%±
1890	1,578		—
1900	3,473		120.1%
1910	5,883		69.4%
1920	6,538		11.1%
1930	6,880		5.2%
1940	7,929		15.2%
1950	9,462		19.3%
1960	10,609		12.1%
1970	10,733		1.2%
1980	11,184		4.2%
1990	10,321		−7.7%
2000	11,608		12.5%
2010	11,147		−4.0%
2020	10,220		−8.3%
2023 (est.)	9,868	▼	−3.4%
U.S. Decennial Census; 1850-1870 1870-1880; 1890-1910 1920-1930; 1940 1950 1960; 1970 1980 1990; 2000 2010

=== 2020 census ===
As of the 2020 census, Cordele had a population of 10,220. The median age was 37.3 years. 26.4% of residents were under the age of 18 and 17.0% of residents were 65 years of age or older. For every 100 females there were 82.0 males, and for every 100 females age 18 and over there were 76.4 males age 18 and over.

94.9% of residents lived in urban areas, while 5.1% lived in rural areas.

There were 4,169 households in Cordele, of which 32.8% had children under the age of 18 living in them. Of those households, 2,453 were families. Of all households, 25.2% were married-couple households, 20.2% were households with a male householder and no spouse or partner present, and 47.9% were households with a female householder and no spouse or partner present. About 35.5% of all households were made up of individuals and 14.2% had someone living alone who was 65 years of age or older.

There were 4,780 housing units, of which 12.8% were vacant. The homeowner vacancy rate was 2.3% and the rental vacancy rate was 5.9%.

Racial composition as of the 2020 census
Race	Number	Percent
White	2,656	26.0%
Black or African American	6,859	67.1%
American Indian and Alaska Native	18	0.2%
Asian	156	1.5%
Native Hawaiian and Other Pacific Islander	4	0.0%
Some other race	188	1.8%
Two or more races	339	3.3%
Hispanic or Latino (of any race)	333	3.3%

== Arts and culture ==
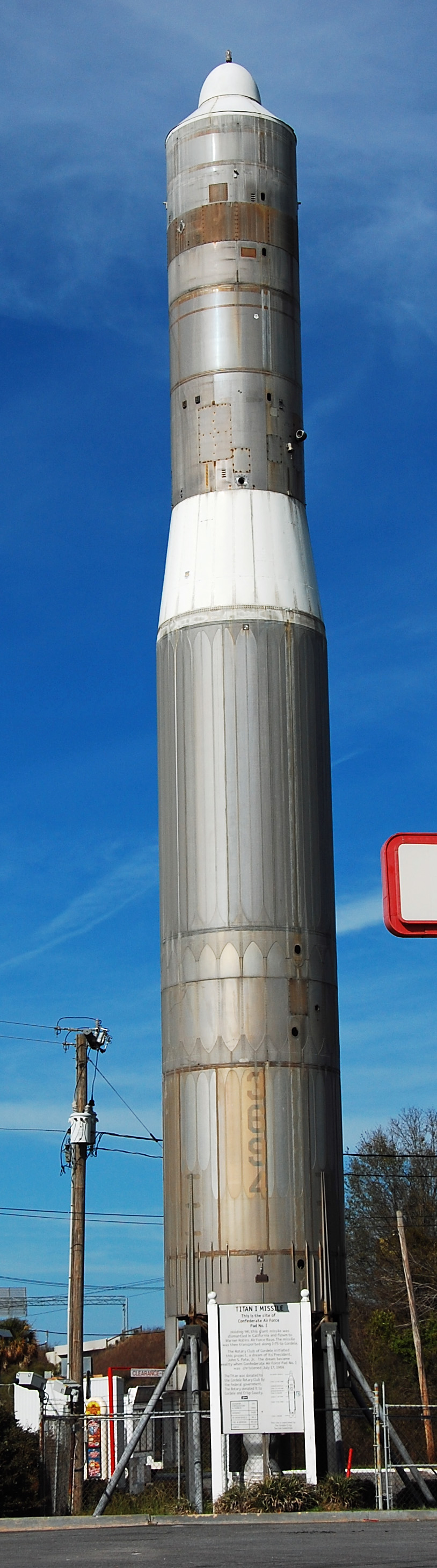
Titan I

Cordele hosts an annual Watermelon Festival.

In 1968, a Titan I missile was erected in Cordele.

== Sports ==
Cordele Motor Speedway is a 3/8-mile asphalt oval racetrack. Race series include Speed Fest, sanctioned by the SRL Southwest Tour. The series features four 125-lap races for the UARA National Tour. The track hosts the World Crown 300 for UARA.

== Government ==
Five citizens of Cordele are elected to serve as the city commissioners. John Wiggins is chairman.

In the Georgia State Senate, Cordele is represented by Senator Carden Summers.

In the Georgia House of Representatives, Cordele is represented by Representative Noel Williams Jr.

In the United States House of Representatives, the Cordele is represented by Representative Sanford Bishop.

== Education ==
=== Crisp County School District ===
Schools in Cordele are administered by the Crisp County School District and include:

- Crisp County Primary
- Crisp County pre-k
- Crisp County Elementary School
- Crisp County Middle School
- Crisp County High School

The district has 266 full-time teachers and over 4,337 students.

== Infrastructure ==
=== Major highways ===
- Interstate 75 / SR 401
- U.S. Route 41 / State Route 7
- U.S. Route 280 / State Route 30
- State Route 33
- State Route 90
- State Route 257
- State Route 300 (Georgia-Florida Parkway)

The Cordele Inland Port is operated by a private company, Cordele Intermodal Services, which offers rail service via the Heart of Georgia Railroad and Georgia Central Railroad, from their rail ramp in Cordele to the Georgia Ports Authority in Savannah. Two class I railroads CSX and Norfolk Southern pass through Cordele. Shortline Railroad, Heart of Georgia currently interchanges with CSX in downtown Cordele.

== Notable people ==
- Buster Brown, blues and R&B singer born in Cordele
- Preston Dennard, former wide receiver for the Los Angeles Rams
- Janie Lou Gibbs, serial killer who poisoned her husband, three sons, and grandson. She was convicted in 1967.
- Devokeyous Keyshawn Hamilton, rapper, singer, and songwriter known professionally as Lazer Dim 700; born in Cordele
- Mac Hyman, fiction writer known for his best-selling novel No Time for Sergeants and Take Now Thy Son; born in Cordele and a lifelong resident
- T. J. Jackson, Olympian and NFL wide receiver
- Marcus Lamb, president of international Christian TV network Daystar
- Arthur Lucas, convicted murderer and one of the last two people to be executed in Canada
- Deworski Odom, sprinter; born in Cordele
- Jody Powell, served as the White House Press Secretary under President Jimmy Carter; born in Cordele
- Andre Ramsey, offensive lineman for the Buffalo Bills
- Tree Rollins, former NBA basketball player and Cordele native who attended Crisp County High School
- Ken Spikes, racing driver
- Quay Walker, linebacker for the Green Bay Packers
- Joe Williams, jazz singer and Cosby Show grandfather; born in Cordele
- Noel Williams Jr. - Insurance agent and politician.
- Jammie Robinson, safety for the Arizona Cardinals
- Taylor Walls - MLB Player Tampa Bay Rays, Florida State Baseball Star, Team USA Baseball, and Crisp County High School Baseball Star
