= 60th United States Congress =

1907-1909 U.S. Congress

| ← | 59th | 61st | → |
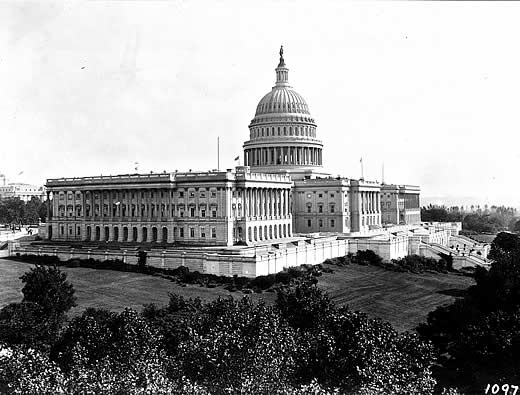
- United States Capitol (1906)

Overview
- Legislative body: United States Congress
- Jurisdiction: United States
- Term: March 4, 1907 – March 4, 1909

Senate
- Members: 90 - 92
- President: Charles W. Fairbanks (R)
- President pro tempore: William P. Frye (R)
- Party control: Republican

House of Representatives
- Members: 386 - 391 representatives 6 non-voting delegates
- Speaker: Joseph G. Cannon (R)
- Party control: Republican

Sessions
- 1st: December 2, 1907 – May 30, 1908
- 2nd: December 7, 1908 – March 3, 1909

The 60th United States Congress was a meeting of the legislative branch of the United States federal government, composed of the United States Senate and the United States House of Representatives. It met in Washington, DC from March 4, 1907, to March 4, 1909, during the last two years of Theodore Roosevelt's presidency. The apportionment of seats in the House of Representatives was based on the 1900 United States census. Both chambers had a Republican majority.

== Major events ==
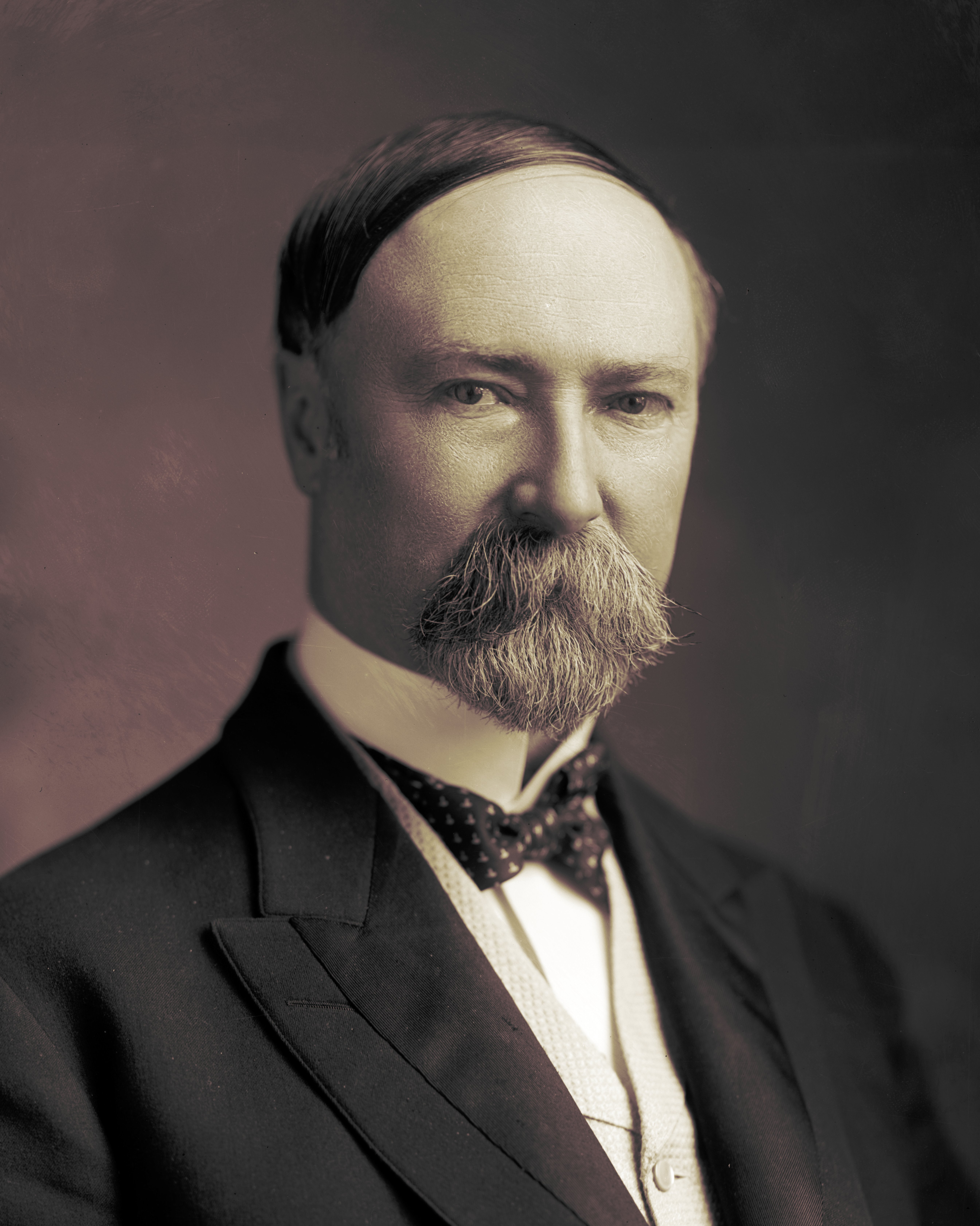
President of the Senate Charles W. Fairbanks

== Major legislation ==
- May 30, 1908 — Aldrich-Vreeland Act, ch. 229, 35 Stat. 546
- 1908 — The Federal Employers Liability Act (FELA), 5645 U.S.C. § 51 et seq.

== States admitted ==
- November 16, 1907: Oklahoma was admitted as the 46th state.

== Party summary ==
=== Senate ===
| | Party (shading shows control) | | Total | Vacant |
| | Democratic (D) | Republican (R) | Total | Vacant |
|---|---|---|---|---|
| End of previous congress | 32 | 58 | 90 | 0 |
| Begin | 29 | 60 | 89 | 1 |
| End | 31 | 61 | 92 | 0 |
| Final voting share | 33.7% | 66.3% | | |
| Beginning of next congress | 32 | 59 | 91 | 1 |

=== House of Representatives ===
| | Party (shading shows control) | | | Total | Vacant |
| | Democratic (D) | Independent Democratic (ID) | Republican (R) | Total | Vacant |
|---|---|---|---|---|---|
| End of previous congress | 133 | 0 | 246 | 379 | 7 |
| Begin | 161 | 1 | 221 | 383 | 3 |
| End | 164 | 1 | 220 | 385 | 6 |
| Final voting share | 42.6% | 0.3% | 57.1% | | |
| Beginning of next congress | 170 | 1 | 218 | 389 | 2 |

== Leadership ==
=== Senate ===
- President: Charles W. Fairbanks (R)
- President pro tempore: William P. Frye (R)

==== Majority (Republican) leadership ====
- Conference Chairman: William B. Allison until August 1908
  - Eugene Hale from December 1908

==== Minority (Democratic) leadership ====
- Caucus chairman: Charles A. Culberson
- Conference secretary: Robert L. Owen

=== House of Representatives ===
- Speaker: Joseph G. Cannon (R)

==== Majority (Republican) leadership ====
- Majority Leader: Sereno E. Payne
- Majority Whip: James E. Watson
- Republican Conference Chair: William Peters Hepburn

==== Minority (Democratic) leadership ====
- Minority Leader: John Sharp Williams until 1908
  - Champ Clark, from 1908
- Minority Whip: James T. Lloyd until 1908; vacant thereafter
- Caucus Chairman: Henry D. Clayton
- Democratic Campaign Committee Chairman: James M. Griggs

== Members ==
Skip to House of Representatives, below

=== Senate ===
At this time, senators were elected by the state legislatures every two years, with one-third beginning new six-year terms with each Congress. Preceding the names in the list below are Senate class numbers, which indicate the cycle of their election, In this Congress, Class 3 meant their term ended with this Congress, requiring reelection in 1908; Class 1 meant their term began in the last Congress, requiring reelection in 1910; and Class 2 meant their term began in this Congress, requiring reelection in 1912.

==== Alabama ====
▌2. John T. Morgan (D), until June 11, 1907

▌John H. Bankhead (D), from June 18, 1907

▌3. Edmund Pettus (D), until July 27, 1907

▌Joseph F. Johnston (D), from August 8, 1907

==== Arkansas ====
▌2. Jeff Davis (D)
▌3. James P. Clarke (D)

==== California ====
▌1. Frank P. Flint (R)
▌3. George C. Perkins (R)

==== Colorado ====
▌2. Simon Guggenheim (R)
▌3. Henry M. Teller (D)

==== Connecticut ====
▌1. Morgan Bulkeley (R)
▌3. Frank B. Brandegee (R)

==== Delaware ====
▌1. Henry A. du Pont (R)
▌2. Harry A. Richardson (R)

==== Florida ====
▌1. James Taliaferro (D)
▌3. Stephen Mallory (D), until December 23, 1907

▌William J. Bryan (D), December 27, 1907 – March 22, 1908
▌William Hall Milton (D), from March 27, 1908

==== Georgia ====
▌2. Augustus O. Bacon (D)
▌3. Alexander S. Clay (D)

==== Idaho ====
▌2. William E. Borah (R)
▌3. Weldon B. Heyburn (R)

==== Illinois ====
▌2. Shelby M. Cullom (R)
▌3. Albert J. Hopkins (R)

==== Indiana ====
▌1. Albert J. Beveridge (R)
▌3. James A. Hemenway (R)

==== Iowa ====
▌2. Jonathan P. Dolliver (R)
▌3. William B. Allison (R), until August 4, 1908

▌Albert B. Cummins (R), from November 24, 1908

==== Kansas ====
▌2. Charles Curtis (R)
▌3. Chester I. Long (R)

==== Kentucky ====
▌2. Thomas H. Paynter (D)
▌3. James B. McCreary (D)

==== Louisiana ====
▌2. Murphy J. Foster (D)
▌3. Samuel D. McEnery (D)

==== Maine ====
▌1. Eugene Hale (R)
▌2. William P. Frye (R)

==== Maryland ====
▌1. Isidor Rayner (D)
▌3. William Pinkney Whyte (D), until March 17, 1908

▌John W. Smith (D), from March 25, 1908

==== Massachusetts ====
▌1. Henry Cabot Lodge (R)
▌2: Winthrop M. Crane (R)

==== Michigan ====
▌1. Julius C. Burrows (R)
▌2. William Alden Smith (R)

==== Minnesota ====
▌1. Moses E. Clapp (R)
▌2. Knute Nelson (R)

==== Mississippi ====
▌1. Hernando D. Money (D)
▌2. Anselm J. McLaurin (D)

==== Missouri ====
▌1. William Warner (R)
▌3. William J. Stone (D)

==== Montana ====
▌1. Thomas H. Carter (R)
▌2. Joseph M. Dixon (R)

==== Nebraska ====
▌1. Elmer J. Burkett (R)
▌2. Norris Brown (R)

==== Nevada ====
▌1. George S. Nixon (R)
▌3. Francis G. Newlands (D)

==== New Hampshire ====
▌2. Henry E. Burnham (R)
▌3. Jacob H. Gallinger (R)

==== New Jersey ====
▌1. John Kean Jr. (R)
▌2. Frank O. Briggs (R)

==== New York ====
▌1. Chauncey M. Depew (R)
▌3. Thomas C. Platt (R)

==== North Carolina ====
▌2. Furnifold M. Simmons (D)
▌3. Lee S. Overman (D)

==== North Dakota ====
▌1. Porter J. McCumber (R)
▌3. Henry C. Hansbrough (R)

==== Ohio ====
▌1: Charles W. F. Dick (R)
▌3. Joseph B. Foraker (R)

==== Oklahoma ====
▌2. Robert L. Owen (D), from December 11, 1907
▌3. Thomas P. Gore (D), from December 11, 1907

==== Oregon ====
▌2. Jonathan Bourne Jr. (R)
▌3. Charles W. Fulton (R)

==== Pennsylvania ====
▌1. Philander C. Knox (R)
▌3. Boies Penrose (R)

==== Rhode Island ====
▌1. Nelson W. Aldrich (R)
▌2. George P. Wetmore (R), from January 22, 1908

==== South Carolina ====
▌2. Benjamin R. Tillman (D)
▌3. Asbury C. Latimer (D), until February 20, 1908

▌Frank B. Gary (D), from March 6, 1908

==== South Dakota ====
▌2. Robert J. Gamble (R)
▌3. Alfred B. Kittredge (R)

==== Tennessee ====
▌1. James B. Frazier (D)
▌2. Robert L. Taylor (D)

==== Texas ====
▌1. Charles A. Culberson (D)
▌2. Joseph W. Bailey (D)

==== Utah ====
▌1. George Sutherland (R)
▌3. Reed Smoot (R)

==== Vermont ====
▌1. Redfield Proctor (R), until March 4, 1908

▌John W. Stewart (R), March 24, 1908 – October 21, 1908
▌Carroll S. Page (R), from October 21, 1908

▌3. William P. Dillingham (R)

==== Virginia ====
▌1. John W. Daniel (D)
▌2. Thomas S. Martin (D)

==== Washington ====
▌1. Samuel H. Piles (R)
▌3. Levi Ankeny (R)

==== West Virginia ====
▌1. Nathan B. Scott (R)
▌2. Stephen B. Elkins (R)

==== Wisconsin ====
▌1. Robert M. La Follette Sr. (R)
▌3. John C. Spooner (R), until April 30, 1907

▌Isaac Stephenson (R), from May 17, 1907

==== Wyoming ====
▌1. Clarence D. Clark (R)
▌2. Francis E. Warren (R)

Senators' party membership by state at the opening of the 60th Congress in March 1907. Oklahoma's Senators were not seated until December 11, 1907. 2 Democrats 1 Democrat and 1 Republican 2 Republicans Territories

=== House of Representatives ===
The names of representatives elected statewide on the general ticket or otherwise at-large, are preceded by an "At-large," and the names of those elected from districts, whether plural or single member, are preceded by their district numbers.

==== Alabama ====
▌1. George W. Taylor (D)
▌2. Ariosto A. Wiley (D), until June 17, 1908

▌Oliver C. Wiley (D), from November 3, 1908

▌3. Henry D. Clayton (D)
▌4. William B. Craig (D)
▌5. J. Thomas Heflin (D)
▌6. Richmond P. Hobson (D)
▌7. John L. Burnett (D)
▌8. William N. Richardson (D)
▌9. Oscar Underwood (D)

==== Arkansas ====
▌1. Robert B. Macon (D)
▌2. Stephen Brundidge Jr. (D)
▌3. John C. Floyd (D)
▌4. William B. Cravens (D)
▌5. Charles C. Reid (D)
▌6. Joseph Taylor Robinson (D)
▌7. Robert M. Wallace (D)

==== California ====
▌1. William F. Englebright (R)
▌2. Duncan E. McKinlay (R)
▌3. Joseph R. Knowland (R)
▌4. Julius Kahn (R)
▌5. Everis A. Hayes (R)
▌6. James C. Needham (R)
▌7. James McLachlan (R)
▌8. Sylvester C. Smith (R)

==== Colorado ====
▌1. Robert W. Bonynge (R)
▌2. Warren A. Haggott (R)
▌At-large. George W. Cook (R)

==== Connecticut ====
▌1. E. Stevens Henry (R)
▌2. Nehemiah D. Sperry (R)
▌3. Edwin W. Higgins (R)
▌4. Ebenezer J. Hill (R)
▌At-large. George L. Lilley (R), until January 5, 1909

==== Delaware ====
▌At-large. Hiram R. Burton (R)

==== Florida ====
▌1. Stephen M. Sparkman (D)
▌2. Frank Clark (D)
▌3. William B. Lamar (D)

==== Georgia ====
▌1. Charles G. Edwards (D)
▌2. James M. Griggs (D)
▌3. Elijah B. Lewis (D)
▌4. William C. Adamson (D)
▌5. Leonidas F. Livingston (D)
▌6. Charles L. Bartlett (D)
▌7. Gordon Lee (D)
▌8. William M. Howard (D)
▌9. Thomas Montgomery Bell (D)
▌10. Thomas W. Hardwick (D)
▌11. William G. Brantley (D)

==== Idaho ====
▌At-large. Burton L. French (R)

==== Illinois ====
▌1. Martin B. Madden (R)
▌2. James R. Mann (R)
▌3. William W. Wilson (R)
▌4. James T. McDermott (D)
▌5. Adolph J. Sabath (D)
▌6. William Lorimer (R)
▌7. Philip Knopf (R)
▌8. Charles McGavin (R)
▌9. Henry S. Boutell (R)
▌10. George E. Foss (R)
▌11. Howard M. Snapp (R)
▌12. Charles Eugene Fuller (R)
▌13. Frank O. Lowden (R)
▌14. James McKinney (R)
▌15. George W. Prince (R)
▌16. Joseph V. Graff (R)
▌17. John A. Sterling (R)
▌18. Joseph G. Cannon (R)
▌19. William B. McKinley (R)
▌20. Henry T. Rainey (D)
▌21. Ben F. Caldwell (D)
▌22. William A. Rodenberg (R)
▌23. Martin D. Foster (D)
▌24. Pleasant T. Chapman (R)
▌25. George Washington Smith (R), until November 30, 1907

▌Napoleon B. Thistlewood (R), from February 15, 1908

==== Indiana ====
▌1. John H. Foster (R)
▌2. John C. Chaney (R)
▌3. William E. Cox (D)
▌4. Lincoln Dixon (D)
▌5. Elias S. Holliday (R)
▌6. James E. Watson (R)
▌7. Jesse Overstreet (R)
▌8. John A.M. Adair (D)
▌9. Charles B. Landis (R)
▌10. Edgar D. Crumpacker (R)
▌11. George W. Rauch (D)
▌12. Clarence C. Gilhams (R)
▌13. Abraham L. Brick (R), until April 7, 1908

▌Henry A. Barnhart (D), from November 3, 1908

==== Iowa ====
▌1. Charles A. Kennedy (R)
▌2. Albert F. Dawson (R)
▌3. Benjamin P. Birdsall (R)
▌4. Gilbert N. Haugen (R)
▌5. Robert G. Cousins (R)
▌6. Daniel W. Hamilton (D)
▌7. John A. T. Hull (R)
▌8. William P. Hepburn (R)
▌9. Walter I. Smith (R)
▌10. James P. Conner (R)
▌11. Elbert H. Hubbard (R)

==== Kansas ====
▌1. Daniel Read Anthony Jr. (R), from May 23, 1907
▌2. Charles Frederick Scott (R)
▌3. Philip P. Campbell (R)
▌4. James Monroe Miller (R)
▌5. William A. Calderhead (R)
▌6. William A. Reeder (R)
▌7. Edmond H. Madison (R)
▌8. Victor Murdock (R)

==== Kentucky ====
▌1. Ollie M. James (D)
▌2. Augustus Stanley (D)
▌3. Addison James (R)
▌4. Ben Johnson (D)
▌5. J. Swagar Sherley (D)
▌6. Joseph L. Rhinock (D)
▌7. William P. Kimball (D)
▌8. Harvey Helm (D)
▌9. Joseph B. Bennett (R)
▌10. John W. Langley (R)
▌11. Don C. Edwards (R)

==== Louisiana ====
▌1. Adolph Meyer (D), until March 8, 1908

▌Albert Estopinal (D), from November 3, 1908

▌2. Robert C. Davey (D), until December 26, 1908
▌3. Robert F. Broussard (D)
▌4. John Thomas Watkins (D)
▌5. Joseph E. Ransdell (D)
▌6. George K. Favrot (D)
▌7. Arsène Paulin Pujó (D)

==== Maine ====
▌1. Amos L. Allen (R)
▌2. Charles E. Littlefield (R), until September 30, 1908

▌John P. Swasey (R), from November 3, 1908

▌3. Edwin C. Burleigh (R)
▌4. Llewellyn Powers (R), until July 28, 1908

▌Frank E. Guernsey (R), from November 3, 1908

==== Maryland ====
▌1. William Humphreys Jackson (R)
▌2. J. Frederick C. Talbott (D)
▌3. Harry B. Wolf (D)
▌4. John Gill Jr. (D)
▌5. Sydney E. Mudd (R)
▌6. George A. Pearre (R)

==== Massachusetts ====
▌1. George P. Lawrence (R)
▌2. Frederick H. Gillett (R)
▌3. Charles G. Washburn (R)
▌4. Charles Q. Tirrell (R)
▌5. Butler Ames (R)
▌6. Augustus P. Gardner (R)
▌7. Ernest W. Roberts (R)
▌8. Samuel W. McCall (R)
▌9. John A. Keliher (D)
▌10. Joseph F. O'Connell (D)
▌11. Andrew J. Peters (D)
▌12. John W. Weeks (R)
▌13. William S. Greene (R)
▌14. William C. Lovering (R)

==== Michigan ====
▌1. Edwin C. Denby (R)
▌2. Charles E. Townsend (R)
▌3. Washington Gardner (R)
▌4. Edward L. Hamilton (R)
▌5. Gerrit J. Diekema (R), from March 17, 1908
▌6. Samuel W. Smith (R)
▌7. Henry McMorran (R)
▌8. Joseph W. Fordney (R)
▌9. James C. McLaughlin (R)
▌10. George A. Loud (R)
▌11. Archibald B. Darragh (R)
▌12. H. Olin Young (R)

==== Minnesota ====
▌1. James Albertus Tawney (R)
▌2. Winfield Scott Hammond (D)
▌3. Charles Russell Davis (R)
▌4. Frederick C. Stevens (R)
▌5. Frank Nye (R)
▌6. Charles August Lindbergh (R)
▌7. Andrew Volstead (R)
▌8. James Bede (R)
▌9. Halvor Steenerson (R)

==== Mississippi ====
▌1. Ezekiel S. Candler Jr. (D)
▌2. Thomas Spight (D)
▌3. Benjamin G. Humphreys II (D)
▌4. Wilson S. Hill (D)
▌5. Adam M. Byrd (D)
▌6. Eaton J. Bowers (D)
▌7. Frank A. McLain (D)
▌8. John Sharp Williams (D)

==== Missouri ====
▌1. James T. Lloyd (D)
▌2. William W. Rucker (D)
▌3. Joshua Willis Alexander (D)
▌4. Charles F. Booher (D)
▌5. Edgar C. Ellis (R)
▌6. David A. De Armond (D)
▌7. Courtney W. Hamlin (D)
▌8. Dorsey W. Shackleford (D)
▌9. James Beauchamp Clark (D)
▌10. Richard Bartholdt (R)
▌11. Henry S. Caulfield (R)
▌12. Harry M. Coudrey (R)
▌13. Madison R. Smith (D)
▌14. Joseph J. Russell (D)
▌15. Thomas Hackney (D)
▌16. J. Robert Lamar (D)

==== Montana ====
▌At-large. Charles N. Pray (R)

==== Nebraska ====
▌1. Ernest M. Pollard (R)
▌2. Gilbert M. Hitchcock (D)
▌3. John Frank Boyd (R)
▌4. Edmund H. Hinshaw (R)
▌5. George W. Norris (R)
▌6. Moses P. Kinkaid (R)

==== Nevada ====
▌At-large. George A. Bartlett (D)

==== New Hampshire ====
▌1. Cyrus Adams Sulloway (R)
▌2. Frank Dunklee Currier (R)

==== New Jersey ====
▌1. Henry C. Loudenslager (R)
▌2. John J. Gardner (R)
▌3. Benjamin F. Howell (R)
▌4. Ira W. Wood (R)
▌5. Charles N. Fowler (R)
▌6. William Hughes (D)
▌7. Richard Wayne Parker (R)
▌8. Le Gage Pratt (D)
▌9. Eugene W. Leake (D)
▌10. James A. Hamill (D)

==== New York ====
▌1. William W. Cocks (R)
▌2. George H. Lindsay (D)
▌3. Charles T. Dunwell (R), until June 12, 1908

▌Otto G. Foelker (R), from November 3, 1908

▌4. Charles B. Law (R)
▌5. George E. Waldo (R)
▌6. William M. Calder (R)
▌7. John J. Fitzgerald (D)
▌8. Daniel J. Riordan (D)
▌9. Henry M. Goldfogle (D)
▌10. William Sulzer (D)
▌11. Charles V. Fornes (D)
▌12. W. Bourke Cockran (D)
▌13. Herbert Parsons (R)
▌14. William Willett Jr. (D)
▌15. J. Van Vechten Olcott (R)
▌16. Francis B. Harrison (D)
▌17. William S. Bennet (R)
▌18. Joseph A. Goulden (D)
▌19. John E. Andrus (R)
▌20. Thomas W. Bradley (R)
▌21. Samuel McMillan (R)
▌22. William H. Draper (R)
▌23. George N. Southwick (R)
▌24. George W. Fairchild (R)
▌25. Cyrus Durey (R)
▌26. George R. Malby (R)
▌27. James S. Sherman (R)
▌28. Charles L. Knapp (R)
▌29. Michael E. Driscoll (R)
▌30. John W. Dwight (R)
▌31. Sereno E. Payne (R)
▌32. James B. Perkins (R)
▌33. J. Sloat Fassett (R)
▌34. Peter A. Porter (R)
▌35. William H. Ryan (D)
▌36. De Alva S. Alexander (R)
▌37. Edward B. Vreeland (R)

==== North Carolina ====
▌1. John Humphrey Small (D)
▌2. Claude Kitchin (D)
▌3. Charles R. Thomas (D)
▌4. Edward W. Pou (D)
▌5. William W. Kitchin (D), until January 11, 1909
▌6. Hannibal L. Godwin (D)
▌7. Robert N. Page (D)
▌8. Richard N. Hackett (D)
▌9. Edwin Y. Webb (D)
▌10. William T. Crawford (D)

==== North Dakota ====
▌At-large. Thomas Frank Marshall (R)
▌At-large. Asle Gronna (R)

==== Ohio ====
▌1. Nicholas Longworth (R)
▌2. Herman P. Goebel (R)
▌3. J. Eugene Harding (R)
▌4. William E. Tou Velle (D)
▌5. Timothy T. Ansberry (D)
▌6. Matthew R. Denver (D)
▌7. J. Warren Keifer (R)
▌8. Ralph D. Cole (R)
▌9. Isaac R. Sherwood (D)
▌10. Henry T. Bannon (R)
▌11. Albert Douglas (R)
▌12. Edward L. Taylor Jr. (R)
▌13. Grant E. Mouser (R)
▌14. J. Ford Laning (R)
▌15. Beman G. Dawes (R)
▌16. Capell L. Weems (R)
▌17. William A. Ashbrook (D)
▌18. James Kennedy (R)
▌19. W. Aubrey Thomas (R)
▌20. L. Paul Howland (R)
▌21. Theodore E. Burton (R), until March 3, 1909

==== Oklahoma ====
▌1. Bird Segle McGuire (R), from November 16, 1907
▌2. Elmer L. Fulton (D), from November 16, 1907
▌3. James S. Davenport (D), from November 16, 1907
▌4. Charles D. Carter (D), from November 16, 1907
▌5. Scott Ferris (D), from November 16, 1907

==== Oregon ====
▌1. Willis C. Hawley (R)
▌2. William R. Ellis (R)

==== Pennsylvania ====
▌1. Henry H. Bingham (R)
▌2. John E. Reyburn (R), until March 31, 1907

▌Joel Cook (R), from November 5, 1907

▌3. J. Hampton Moore (R)
▌4. Reuben O. Moon (R)
▌5. William W. Foulkrod (R)
▌6. George D. McCreary (R)
▌7. Thomas S. Butler (R)
▌8. Irving P. Wanger (R)
▌9. Henry B. Cassel (R)
▌10. Thomas D. Nicholls (ID)
▌11. John T. Lenahan (D)
▌12. Charles N. Brumm (R), until January 4, 1909
▌13. John H. Rothermel (D)
▌14. George W. Kipp (D)
▌15. William B. Wilson (D)
▌16. John G. McHenry (D)
▌17. Benjamin K. Focht (R)
▌18. Marlin E. Olmsted (R)
▌19. John M. Reynolds (R)
▌20. Daniel F. Lafean (R)
▌21. Charles F. Barclay (R)
▌22. George F. Huff (R)
▌23. Allen F. Cooper (R)
▌24. Ernest F. Acheson (R)
▌25. Arthur L. Bates (R)
▌26. J. Davis Brodhead (D)
▌27. Joseph G. Beale (R)
▌28. Nelson P. Wheeler (R)
▌29. William H. Graham (R)
▌30. John Dalzell (R)
▌31. James F. Burke (R)
▌32. Andrew J. Barchfeld (R)

==== Rhode Island ====
▌1. Daniel L. D. Granger (D), until February 14, 1909
▌2. Adin B. Capron (R)

==== South Carolina ====
▌1. George S. Legare (D)
▌2. James O. Patterson (D)
▌3. Wyatt Aiken (D)
▌4. Joseph T. Johnson (D)
▌5. David E. Finley (D)
▌6. J. Edwin Ellerbe (D)
▌7. Asbury F. Lever (D)

==== South Dakota ====
▌At-large. Philo Hall (R)
▌At-large. William H. Parker (R), until June 26, 1908

▌Eben Martin (R), from November 3, 1908

==== Tennessee ====
▌1. Walter P. Brownlow (R)
▌2. Nathan W. Hale (R)
▌3. John A. Moon (D)
▌4. Cordell Hull (D)
▌5. William C. Houston (D)
▌6. John W. Gaines (D)
▌7. Lemuel P. Padgett (D)
▌8. Thetus W. Sims (D)
▌9. Finis J. Garrett (D)
▌10. George W. Gordon (D)

==== Texas ====
▌1. Morris Sheppard (D)
▌2. Samuel B. Cooper (D)
▌3. Gordon J. Russell (D)
▌4. Choice B. Randell (D)
▌5. James Andrew Beall (D)
▌6. Rufus Hardy (D)
▌7. Alexander W. Gregg (D)
▌8. John M. Moore (D)
▌9. George Farmer Burgess (D)
▌10. Albert S. Burleson (D)
▌11. Robert L. Henry (D)
▌12. Oscar W. Gillespie (D)
▌13. John H. Stephens (D)
▌14. James L. Slayden (D)
▌15. John Nance Garner (D)
▌16. William R. Smith (D)

==== Utah ====
▌At-large. Joseph Howell (R)

==== Vermont ====
▌1. David J. Foster (R)
▌2. Kittredge Haskins (R)

==== Virginia ====
▌1. William A. Jones (D)
▌2. Harry L. Maynard (D)
▌3. John Lamb (D)
▌4. Francis R. Lassiter (D)
▌5. Edward W. Saunders (D)
▌6. Carter Glass (D)
▌7. James Hay (D)
▌8. Charles Creighton Carlin (D), from November 5, 1907
▌9. Campbell Slemp (R), until October 13, 1907

▌C. Bascom Slemp (R), from December 17, 1907

▌10. Henry D. Flood (D)

==== Washington ====
▌At-large. Wesley Livsey Jones (R)
▌At-large. Francis W. Cushman (R)
▌At-large. William E. Humphrey (R)

==== West Virginia ====
▌1. William P. Hubbard (R)
▌2. George Cookman Sturgiss (R)
▌3. Joseph Holt Gaines (R)
▌4. Harry C. Woodyard (R)
▌5. James Anthony Hughes (R)

==== Wisconsin ====
▌1. Henry Allen Cooper (R)
▌2. John M. Nelson (R)
▌3. James William Murphy (D)
▌4. William J. Cary (R)
▌5. William H. Stafford (R)
▌6. Charles H. Weisse (D)
▌7. John J. Esch (R)
▌8. James H. Davidson (R)
▌9. Gustav Küstermann (R)
▌10. Elmer A. Morse (R)
▌11. John J. Jenkins (R)

==== Wyoming ====
▌At-large. Franklin W. Mondell (R)

==== Non-voting members ====
▌Alaska Territory. Thomas Cale (I)
▌Arizona Territory. Marcus A. Smith (D)
▌Hawaii Territory. Jonah Kūhiō Kalanianaʻole (R)
▌New Mexico Territory. William Henry Andrews (R)
▌Philippines. Benito Legarda y Tuason (Fed., R), from November 22, 1907
▌Philippines. Pablo Ocampo (Nac., D), from November 22, 1907
▌Puerto Rico. Tulio Larrínaga (Resident Commissioner) (Unionist)

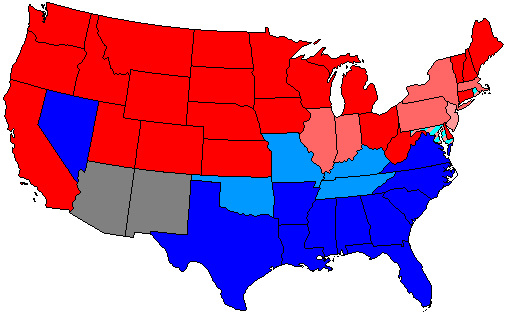
House seats by party holding plurality in state: 80+% to 100% Democratic / 80+% to 100% Republican; 60+% to 80% Democratic / 60+% to 80% Republican; Up to 60% Democratic / Up to 60% Republican

== Changes in membership ==
The count below reflects changes from the beginning of the first session of this Congress.

=== Senate ===
- Replacements: 10
  - Democratic: no net change
  - Republican: no net change
- Deaths: 8
- Resignations: 1
- Vacancy: 1
- Total seats with changes: 11

| State (class) | Vacated by | Reason for vacancy | Subsequent | Date of successor's installation |
|---|---|---|---|---|
| Rhode Island (2) | Vacant | Senator Wetmore's term had expired at the end of previous Congress, having the Legislature failed to re-elect him on time. Wetmore was re-elected late. | George P. Wetmore (R) | January 22, 1908 |
| Wisconsin (3) | John C. Spooner (R) | Resigned April 30, 1907. Successor was elected. | Isaac Stephenson (R) | May 17, 1907 |
| Alabama (2) | John Tyler Morgan (D) | Died June 11, 1907. Successor was appointed and subsequently elected to finish the term | John H. Bankhead (D) | June 18, 1907 |
| Alabama (3) | Edmund Pettus (D) | Died July 27, 1907. Successor was appointed and subsequently elected to finish the term. | Joseph F. Johnston (D) | August 6, 1907 |
| Oklahoma (2) | New seats | Oklahoma achieved statehood November 16, 1907. New Senators were elected to represent Oklahoma for the first time. | Robert L. Owen (D) | December 11, 1907 |
| Oklahoma (3) | New seats | Oklahoma achieved statehood November 16, 1907. New Senators were elected to represent Oklahoma for the first time. | Thomas Gore (D) | December 11, 1907 |
| Florida (3) | Stephen Mallory II (D) | Died December 23, 1907. Successor was appointed and subsequently died. | William J. Bryan (D) | December 27, 1907 |
| South Carolina (3) | Asbury Latimer (D) | Died February 20, 1908. Successor was appointed to finish the term. | Frank B. Gary (D) | March 6, 1908 |
| Vermont (1) | Redfield Proctor (R) | Died March 4, 1908. Successor was appointed. | John W. Stewart (R) | March 24, 1908 |
| Maryland (3) | William P. Whyte (D) | Died March 17, 1908. Successor was appointed and subsequently elected. | John W. Smith (D) | March 25, 1908 |
| Florida (3) | William J. Bryan (D) | Died March 22, 1908. Successor was appointed. | William H. Milton (D) | March 27, 1908 |
| Iowa (3) | William B. Allison (R) | Died August 4, 1908. Successor was elected to finish the term, as well as elected to the next term. | Albert B. Cummins (R) | November 24, 1908 |
| Vermont (1) | John W. Stewart (R) | Successor was elected to finish the term. | Carroll S. Page (R) | October 21, 1908 |

=== House of Representatives ===
- Replacements: 13
  - Democratic: 4 seat gain
  - Republican: 2 seat loss
- Deaths: 10
- Resignations: 7
- Contested elections: 0
- New seats: 7
- Total seats with changes: 20

| District | Previous | Reason for change | Subsequent | Date of successor's installation |
|---|---|---|---|---|
| Michigan 5th | Vacant | Rep. William Alden Smith resigned during previous congress | Gerrit J. Diekema (R) | April 27, 1907 |
| Kansas 1st | Vacant | Rep. Charles Curtis resigned during previous congress having been elected to the U.S. Senate. | Daniel R. Anthony Jr. (R) | May 23, 1907 |
| Virginia 8th | Vacant | Rep. John F. Rixey died during previous congress | Charles C. Carlin (D) | November 5, 1907 |
| Pennsylvania 2nd | John E. Reyburn (R) | Resigned March 31, 1907, after being elected Mayor of Philadelphia | Joel Cook (R) | November 5, 1907 |
| Virginia 9th | Campbell Slemp (R) | Died October 13, 1907 | C. Bascom Slemp (R) | December 17, 1907 |
| Oklahoma 1st | New seat | New State November 16, 1907. | Bird S. McGuire (R) | November 16, 1907 |
| Oklahoma 2nd | New seat | New State November 16, 1907. | Elmer L. Fulton (D) | November 16, 1907 |
| Oklahoma 3rd | New seat | New State November 16, 1907. | James S. Davenport (D) | November 16, 1907 |
| Oklahoma 4th | New seat | New State November 16, 1907. | Charles D. Carter (D) | November 16, 1907 |
| Oklahoma 5th | New seat | New State November 16, 1907. | Scott Ferris (D) | November 16, 1907 |
| Philippines Resident Commissioner | New seat | New territory November 22, 1907 | Benito Legarda (R) | November 22, 1909 |
| Philippines Resident Commissioner | New seat | New territory November 22, 1907 | Pablo Ocampo (D) | November 22, 1909 |
| Illinois 25th | George W. Smith (R) | Died November 30, 1907 | Napoleon B. Thistlewood (R) | February 15, 1908 |
| Louisiana 1st | Adolph Meyer (D) | Died March 8, 1908 | Albert Estopinal (D) | November 3, 1908 |
| New York 3rd | Charles T. Dunwell (R) | Died June 12, 1908 | Otto G. Foelker (R) | November 3, 1908 |
| Indiana 13th | Abraham L. Brick (R) | Died April 7, 1908 | Henry A. Barnhart (D) | November 3, 1908 |
| Alabama 2nd | Ariosto A. Wiley (D) | Died June 17, 1908 | Oliver C. Wiley (D) | November 3, 1908 |
| South Dakota At-large | William H. Parker (R) | Died June 26, 1908 | Eben Martin (R) | November 3, 1908 |
| Maine 4th | Llewellyn Powers (R) | Died July 28, 1908 | Frank E. Guernsey (R) | November 3, 1908 |
| Maine 2nd | Charles E. Littlefield (R) | Died September 30, 1908 | John P. Swasey (R) | November 3, 1908 |
| Louisiana 2nd | Robert C. Davey (D) | Died December 26, 1908 | Seat remained vacant until next Congress | |
| Pennsylvania 12th | Charles N. Brumm (R) | Resigned January 4, 1909, after becoming judge for Schuylkill County Court of Common Pleas | Seat remained vacant until next Congress | |
| Connecticut At-large | George L. Lilley (R) | Resigned January 5, 1909, after being elected Governor of Connecticut | Seat remained vacant until next Congress | |
| North Carolina 5th | William W. Kitchin (D) | Resigned January 11, 1909, after being elected Governor of North Carolina | Seat remained vacant until next Congress | |
| Rhode Island 1st | Daniel L. D. Granger (D) | Died February 14, 1909, having already lost re-election. | Seat remained vacant until next Congress | |
| Ohio 21st | Theodore E. Burton (R) | Resigned March 3, 1909, after being elected to the U.S. Senate | Seat remained vacant until next Congress | |

== Committees ==
Lists of committees and their party leaders for members of the House and Senate committees can be found through the Official Congressional Directory at the bottom of this article. The directory after the pages of terms of service lists committees of the Senate, House (Standing with Subcommittees, Select and Special) and Joint and, after that, House/Senate committee assignments. On the committees section of the House and Senate in the Official Congressional Directory, the committee's members on the first row on the left side shows the chairman of the committee and on the right side shows the ranking member of the committee.

=== Senate ===
- Additional Accommodations for the Library of Congress (Select) (Chairman: Thomas S. Martin)
- Agriculture and Forestry (Chairman: Redfield Proctor; Ranking Member: Hernando D. Money)
- Appropriations (Chairman: William B. Allison; Ranking Member: Henry M. Teller)
- Audit and Control the Contingent Expenses of the Senate (Chairman: John Kean; Ranking Member: Hernando D. Money)
- Canadian Relations (Chairman: Winthrop Murray Crane; Ranking Member: Benjamin R. Tillman)
- Census (Chairman: Chester I. Long; Ranking Member: Samuel D. McEnery)
- Civil Service and Retrenchment (Chairman: George C. Perkins; Ranking Member: Anselm J. McLaurin)
- Claims (Chairman: Charles W. Fulton; Ranking Member: Thomas S. Martin)
- Coast and Insular Survey (Chairman: Samuel H. Piles; Ranking Member: Alexander S. Clay)
- Coast Defenses (Chairman: George S. Nixon; Ranking Member: Charles A. Culberson)
- Commerce (Chairman: William P. Frye; Ranking Member: N/A)
- Corporations Organized in the District of Columbia (Chairman: Samuel D. McEnery; Ranking Member: Nelson W. Aldrich)
- Cuban Relations (Chairman: Henry E. Burnham; Ranking Member: Henry M. Teller)
- Distributing Public Revenue Among the States (Select) (Chairman: Hernando D. Money)
- District of Columbia (Chairman: Jacob H. Gallinger; Ranking Member: Thomas S. Martin)
- Education and Labor (Chairman: Jonathan P. Dolliver; Ranking Member: John W. Daniel)
- Engrossed Bills (Chairman: Augustus O. Bacon; Ranking Member: Alfred B. Kittredge)
- Enrolled Bills (Chairman: Albert J. Hopkins; Ranking Member: Murphy J. Foster)
- Establish a University in the United States (Select) (Chairman: James A. Hemenway; Ranking Member: Charles A. Culberson)
- Examination of Disposition of Documents (Select)
- Examine the Several Branches in the Civil Service (Chairman: Joseph M. Dixon; Ranking Member: John W. Daniel)
- Expenditures in the Department of Agriculture (Select) (Chairman: Isaac Stephenson; Ranking Member: Furnifold M. Simmons)
- Expenditures in Executive Departments (Chairman: Hernando D. Money; Ranking Member: Jacob H. Gallinger)
- Expenditures in the Interior Department (Select) (Chairman: Harry A. Richardson; Ranking Member: James B. McCreary)
- Expenditures in the Department of Justice (Select) (Chairman: Norris Brown; Ranking Member: Joseph W. Bailey)
- Expenditures in the Navy Department (Select) (Chairman: Simon Guggenheim; Ranking Member: Thomas S. Martin then Benjamin R. Tillman)
- Expenditures in the Treasury Department (Select) (Chairman: Frank O. Briggs; Ranking Member: William Pinkney Whyte then James P. Clarke)
- Expenditures in the War Department (Select) (Chairman: Benjamin R. Tillman; Ranking Member: Hernando D. Money then Murphy J. Foster Jr.)
- Finance (Chairman: Nelson W. Aldrich; Ranking Member: John W. Daniel)
- Fisheries (Chairman: Jonathan Bourne Jr.; Ranking Member: Stephen R. Mallory then Samuel D. McEnery)
- Five Civilized Tribes of Indians (Select) (Chairman: Benjamin R. Tillman; Ranking Member: Alfred B. Kittredge)
- Foreign Relations (Chairman: Shelby M. Cullom; Ranking Member: Augustus O. Bacon)
- Forest Reservations and the Protection of Game (Chairman: Frank B. Brandegee; Ranking Member: Benjamin R. Tillman)
- Geological Survey (Chairman: Frank P. Flint; Ranking Member: Hernando D. Money)
- Immigration (Chairman: William P. Dillingham; Ranking Member: Anselm J. McLaurin)
- Indian Affairs (Chairman: Moses E. Clapp; Ranking Member: William J. Stone)
- Indian Depredations (Chairman: Moses E. Clapp; Ranking Member: Thomas S. Martin)
- Industrial Expositions (Chairman: William Warner; Ranking Member: John W. Daniel)
- Interoceanic Canals (Chairman: Alfred B. Kittredge; Ranking Member: James P. Taliaferro)
- Interstate Commerce (Chairman: Stephen B. Elkins; Ranking Member: Benjamin R. Tillman)
- Investigate the Condition of the Potomac River Front at Washington (Select) (Chairman: Joseph H. Millard; Ranking Member: Thomas S. Martin)
- Irrigation (Chairman: Levi Ankeny; Ranking Member: Joseph W. Bailey)
- Judiciary (Chairman: Clarence D. Clark; Ranking Member: Augustus O. Bacon)
- Library (Chairman: N/A; Ranking Member: John W. Daniel)
- Manufactures (Chairman: Weldon B. Heyburn; Ranking Member: Alexander S. Clay)
- Military Affairs (Chairman: Francis E. Warren; Ranking Member: James P. Taliaferro)
- Mines and Mining (Chairman: Charles Dick; Ranking Member: Benjamin R. Tillman)
- Mississippi River and its Tributaries (Select) (Chairman: Knute Nelson; Ranking Member: Samuel D. McEnery)
- National Banks (Select) (Chairman: William A. Smith)
- Naval Affairs (Chairman: Eugene Hale; Ranking Member: Anselm J. McLaurin)
- Organization, Conduct and Expenditures of the Executive Departments (Chairman: Thomas H. Carter; Ranking Member: Anselm J. McLaurin)
- Pacific Islands and Puerto Rico (Chairman: Joseph B. Foraker; Ranking Member: N/A)
- Pacific Railroads (Chairman: Elmer J. Burkett; Ranking Member: James P. Taliaferro)
- Patents (Chairman: Reed Smoot; Ranking Member: N/A)
- Pensions (Chairman: Porter J. McCumber; Ranking Member: James P. Taliaferro)
- Philippines (Chairman: Henry Cabot Lodge; Ranking Member: Charles A. Culberson)
- Post Office and Post Roads (Chairman: Boies Penrose; Ranking Member: Alexander S. Clay)
- Potomac River Front (Select)
- Printing (Chairman: Thomas C. Platt; Ranking Member: William Pinkney Whyte)
- Private Land Claims (Chairman: Henry M. Teller; Ranking Member: Eugene Hale)
- Privileges and Elections (Chairman: Julius C. Burrows; Ranking Member: Josiah W. Bailey)
- Public Buildings and Grounds (Chairman: Nathan B. Scott; Ranking Member: Charles A. Culberson)
- Public Health and National Quarantine (Chairman: John W. Daniel; Ranking Member: Chauncey M. Depew)
- Public Lands (Chairman: Henry C. Hansbrough; Ranking Member: Samuel D. McEnery)
- Railroads (Chairman: Morgan G. Bulkeley; Ranking Member: Augustus O. Bacon)
- Revision of the Laws (Chairman: Chauncey M. Depew; Ranking Member: John W. Daniel)
- Revolutionary Claims (Chairman: James P. Taliaferro; Ranking Member: William A. Smith)
- Rules (Chairman: Philander C. Knox; Ranking Member: Augustus O. Bacon)
- Standards, Weights and Measures (Select) (Chairman: William E. Borah; Ranking Member: James B. McCreary)
- Tariff Regulation (Select)
- Territories (Chairman: Albert J. Beveridge; Ranking Member: James P. Clarke)
- Transportation and Sale of Meat Products (Select) (Chairman: Samuel D. McEnery; Ranking Member: Charles A. Culberson)
- Transportation Routes to the Seaboard (Chairman: Robert J. Gamble; Ranking Member: John W. Daniel)
- Trespassers upon Indian Lands (Select) (Chairman: George Sutherland; Ranking Member: Clarence D. Clark)
- Ventilation and Acoustics (Select)
- Whole
- Woman Suffrage (Select) (Chairman: Alexander S. Clay; Ranking Member: N/A)

=== House of Representatives ===
- Accounts (Chairman: James A. Hughes; Ranking Member: Charles L. Bartlett)
- Agriculture (Chairman: Charles Frederick Scott; Ranking Member: John Lamb)
- Alcoholic Liquor Traffic (Chairman: Nehemiah D. Sperry; Ranking Member: N/A)
- Appropriations (Chairman: James A. Tawney; Ranking Member: Leonidas Livingston)
- Banking and Currency (Chairman: Charles N. Fowler; Ranking Member: Elijah B. Lewis)
- Bills and Resolutions Introduced in the House (Select)
- Census (Chairman: Edgar D. Crumpacker; Ranking Member: James Hay)
- Claims (Chairman: James M. Miller; Ranking Member: Henry M. Goldfogle)
- Coinage, Weights and Measures (Chairman: William B. McKinley; Ranking Member: John W. Gaines)
- Disposition of Executive Papers (Chairman: Arthur L. Bates; Ranking Member: Joshua Frederick Cockey Talbott)
- District of Columbia (Chairman: Samuel W. Smith; Ranking Member: Thetus W. Sims)
- Education (Chairman: George N. Southwick; Ranking Member: Asbury F. Lever)
- Election of the President, Vice President and Representatives in Congress (Chairman: Joseph H. Gaines; Ranking Member: William W. Rucker)
- Elections No.#1 (Chairman: James R. Mann; Ranking Member: Ollie M. James)
- Elections No.#2 (Chairman: Marlin E. Olmsted; Ranking Member: Adam M. Byrd)
- Elections No.#3 (Chairman: Michael E. Driscoll; Ranking Member: Claude Kitchin)
- Enrolled Bills (Chairman: William W. Wilson; Ranking Member: Henry Thomas Rainey)
- Expenditures in the Agriculture Department (Chairman: Charles E. Littlefield; Ranking Member: Henry D. Flood)
- Expenditures in the Commerce and Labor Departments (Chairman: David J. Foster; Ranking Member: Arsene Pujo)
- Expenditures in the Interior Department (Chairman: Sydney E. Mudd; Ranking Member: Henry M. Goldfogle)
- Expenditures in the Justice Department (Chairman: Gilbert N. Haugen; Ranking Member: Robert N. Page)
- Expenditures in the Navy Department (Chairman: Henry S. Boutell; Ranking Member: Lemuel P. Padgett)
- Expenditures in the Post Office Department (Chairman: Irving P. Wanger; Ranking Member: Carter Glass)
- Expenditures in the State Department (Chairman: John W. Weeks; Ranking Member: Samuel B. Cooper)
- Expenditures in the Treasury Department (Chairman: Philip Knopf; Ranking Member: John Lamb)
- Expenditures in the War Department (Chairman: George P. Lawrence; Ranking Member: Joseph L. Rhinock)
- Expenditures on Public Buildings (Chairman: E. Stevens Henry; Ranking Member: John H. Small)
- Foreign Affairs (Chairman: Robert G. Cousins; Ranking Member: William M. Howard)
- Immigration and Naturalization (Chairman: Benjamin F. Howell; Ranking Member: John L. Burnett)
- Indian Affairs (Chairman: James S. Sherman; Ranking Member: John H. Stephens)
- Industrial Arts and Expositions (Chairman: Augustus P. Gardner; Ranking Member: Harry L. Maynard)
- Insular Affairs (Chairman: Henry Allen Cooper; Ranking Member: William A. Jones)
- Interstate and Foreign Commerce (Chairman: William P. Hepburn; Ranking Member: Robert C. Davey)
- Invalid Pensions (Chairman: Cyrus A. Sulloway; Ranking Member: George H. Lindsay)
- Irrigation of Arid Lands (Chairman: William A. Reeder; Ranking Member: William R. Smith)
- Judiciary (Chairman: John J. Jenkins; Ranking Member: David A. De Armond)
- Labor (Chairman: John J. Gardner; Ranking Member: Henry Thomas Rainey)
- Levees and Improvements of the Mississippi River (Chairman: George W. Prince; Ranking Member: Robert F. Broussard)
- Library (Chairman: Samuel W. McCall; Ranking Member: William M. Howard)
- Manufactures (Chairman: Henry McMorran; Ranking Member: Charles H. Weisse)
- Merchant Marine and Fisheries (Chairman: William S. Greene; Ranking Member: Thomas Spight)
- Mileage (Chairman: Charles N. Brumm; Ranking Member: Elijah B. Lewis)
- Military Affairs (Chairman: John A.T. Hull; Ranking Member: William Sulzer)
- Militia (Chairman: Halvor Steenerson; Ranking Member: Ariosto A. Wiley)
- Mines and Mining (Chairman: George F. Huff; Ranking Member: Gordon Lee)
- Naval Affairs (Chairman: George E. Foss; Ranking Member: Adolph Meyer)
- Pacific Railroads (Chairman: Thomas S. Butler; Ranking Member: James L. Slayden)
- Patents (Chairman: Frank D. Currier; Ranking Member: William Sulzer)
- Pensions (Chairman: Henry C. Loudenslager; Ranking Member: William Richardson)
- Post Office and Post Roads (Chairman: Jesse Overstreet; Ranking Member: John A. Moon)
- Printing (Chairman: Charles B. Landis; Ranking Member: David E. Finley)
- Private Land Claims (Chairman: Thomas F. Marshall; Ranking Member: William A. Jones)
- Public Buildings and Grounds (Chairman: Richard Bartholdt; Ranking Member: William G. Brantley)
- Public Lands (Chairman: Frank W. Mondell; Ranking Member: John W. Gaines)
- Railways and Canals (Chairman: James H. Davidson; Ranking Member: James O. Patterson)
- Reform in the Civil Service (Chairman: Frederick H. Gillett; Ranking Member: William P. Kimball)
- Revision of Laws (Chairman: Reuben O. Moon; Ranking Member: Robert B. Macon)
- Rivers and Harbors (Chairman: Theodore E. Burton; Ranking Member: Stephen M. Sparkman)
- Rules (Chairman: John Dalzell; Ranking Member: John S. Williams)
- Standards of Official Conduct
- Territories (Chairman: Edward L. Hamilton; Ranking Member: James T. Lloyd)
- Ventilation and Acoustics (Chairman: William H. Graham; Ranking Member: N/A)
- War Claims (Chairman: Kittredge Haskins; Ranking Member: Thetus W. Sims)
- Ways and Means (Chairman: Sereno E. Payne; Ranking Member: Champ Clark)
- Whole

=== Joint committees ===
- Conditions of Indian Tribes (Special)
- Disposition of (Useless) Executive Papers
- The Library
- Printing

== Caucuses ==
- Democratic (House)
- Democratic (Senate)

== Employees ==
=== Legislative branch agency directors ===
- Architect of the Capitol: Elliott Woods
- Librarian of Congress: Herbert Putnam
- Public Printer of the United States: Charles A. Stillings, until 1908
  - John S. Leech, 1908
  - Samuel B. Donnelly, from 1908

=== Senate ===
- Secretary: Charles G. Bennett
- Sergeant at Arms: Daniel M. Ransdell
- Librarian: Edward C. Goodwin
- Chaplain: Edward E. Hale, Unitarian

=== House of Representatives ===
- Clerk: Alexander McDowell
- Sergeant at Arms: Henry Casson
- Doorkeeper: Frank B. Lyon
- Postmaster: Samuel Langum, elected December 2, 1907
- Reading Clerks: E. L. Lampson (D) and Dennis E. Alward (R)
- Clerk at the Speaker's Table: Asher C. Hinds
- Chaplain: Henry N. Couden, Universalist

== See also ==
- 1906 United States elections (elections leading to this Congress)
  - 1906–07 United States Senate elections
  - 1906 United States House of Representatives elections
- 1908 United States elections (elections during this Congress, leading to the next Congress)
  - 1908 United States presidential election
  - 1908–09 United States Senate elections
  - 1908 United States House of Representatives elections
