= Napoleon B. Broward =

American politician (1857–1910)

Napoleon Bonaparte Broward
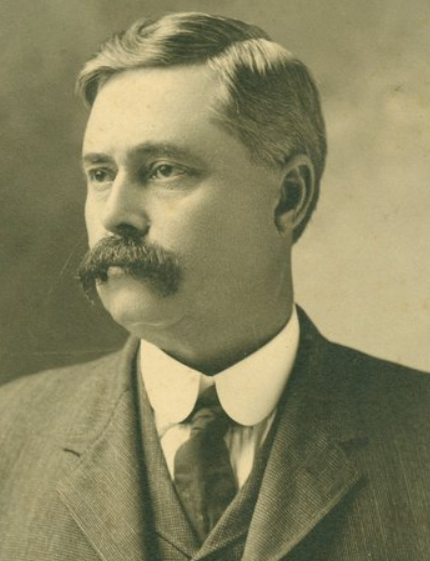

United States Senator-elect from Florida
- In office Died before assuming office
- Preceded by: James Taliaferro
- Succeeded by: Nathan P. Bryan

19th Governor of Florida
- In office January 3, 1905 – January 5, 1909
- Preceded by: William S. Jennings
- Succeeded by: Albert W. Gilchrist

Member of the Florida House of Representatives
- In office 1902–1904

Sheriff of Duval County, Florida
- In office February 27, 1888 – 1894

Personal details
- Born: April 19, 1857 Duval County, Florida, U.S.
- Died: October 1, 1910 (aged 53) Jacksonville, Florida, U.S.
- Party: Democratic
- Spouses: Georgiana Carolina Kemp (m. 1883; died 1883) Annie Isabell Douglass (m. 1887)
- Children: 10 (1 with Kemp, 9 with Douglass)

Napoleon Bonaparte Broward (April 19, 1857 – October 1, 1910) was an American river pilot, captain, and politician. He was elected as the 19th governor of the U.S. state of Florida, serving from January 3, 1905, to January 5, 1909. He was most widely known for his major project to drain the Everglades, to recover land for agricultural cultivation. As governor, he built alliances with the federal government to gain funds for this project. In 1915, the newly formed Broward County was named in his honor.

Broward previously served as the sheriff of Duval County, Florida and in the Florida House of Representatives. He was allied with the Straightouts, Populist-leaning elements of the Democratic Party in the state.

According to one study, Napoleon started "'the Broward Era' of liberal, or 'progressive,' government, which continued under his successors Albert W. Gilchrist and Park Trammell."

== Early life and education ==
His childhood was spent on a series of family plantations along the St. Johns River in Jacksonville. During the Civil War, the Broward family plantation was burned by Union troops occupying the town, and the Broward family's slaves were freed. After the war, the Browards struggled to recover.

Broward's parents both died when he was still quite young. Broward, along with his brother, tended the family farm for a few years before moving into the city with their uncle.

Broward first worked on the river with this uncle, Joe Parsons, doing odd jobs on his steamboat during the summer. In 1876, having graduated high school, Broward became a ship's mate and traveled to New England. He stayed in that region for two years, working on ships along the New England coast and coming home a stout young man, standing six foot two and weighing over two hundred pounds.

After gaining experience in the north as a ship's mate, in 1878 Broward returned to Jacksonville and took a job working tugboats on the St. Johns River. He became acquainted with many of the captains and shipping operations.

Broward married his captain's daughter (Georgiana Carolina "Carrie" Kemp) in January 1883. That spring, he applied for a license to pilot ships over the St. Johns Bar, a constantly shifting sandbar that stretched across the mouth of the St. Johns, sometimes above water and sometimes many feet below. Piloting ships over the treacherous bar was quite lucrative.

Broward seemed destined for a life of comfort until his wife died a day after giving birth to his son in late October 1883. The son, also named Napoleon Bonaparte Broward, would only live for six weeks.

By 1885, he was back on the St. Johns, piloting his father-in-law's steamboat Kate Spencer. While working on the ship, he met the young daughter of a fellow boat captain, Annie Isabell Douglass, a frequent passenger and the two were married in 1887. The couple ended up having eight daughters and one son:

- Annie Dorcas Broward Starrett (1889–1923)
- Josephine Broward Beckley (1892–1970)
- Enid Lyle Broward Hardee (1894–1943)
- Elsie Hortense Broward Dumas (1896–1948)
- Ella Jeanette Broward Shevlin (1899–1961)
- Agnes Carolyn Broward Craig (1901–1995)
- Florida Douglass Broward Segrest (1904–1988)
- Elizabeth Hutchison Broward Crawford (1906–1992)
- Napoleon Bonaparte Broward III (1910–1989)

== Political beginnings ==
Broward established his reputation as a good pilot and captain. In January 1888, a major prison break disgraced the city's sheriff, who was subsequently removed from office. The county Democratic leadership convened and nominated Broward as the best man to become the new sheriff. The governor appointed him to the post on February 27. In less than a month, Broward gained statewide notoriety for breaking up gambling operations in the city.

Broward soon took an active part in city politics. In the early 1890s, the Democratic Party in Florida was undergoing some internal strife. Two factions developed in Jacksonville that eventually became the major statewide camps, the Antis and the Straightouts. The Antis were conservative and pro-business, whereas the Straightouts were allied with Populists and agrarians. Broward joined the Straightout camp. In this period, Populists, sometimes in biracial alliances with Republicans, won numerous states in the South. The Democratic Party struggled to regain power in state legislatures.

In the election of 1892, the Straightouts, under Broward's leadership, swept the city offices: Broward's close friends, John N.C. Stockton and John M. Barrs, became city attorney and councilman, respectively, while Broward retained the sheriff's office. (He was an indicted felon when elected.) The Antis continued to struggle for power and two years later, the split between the two camps became even more severe. The Antis the Straightouts accused each other of voter fraud, complaining to the secretary of state and the governor. Anti sympathizers held most of the state offices, and the Antis won out. Broward was replaced by a new appointee when the Antis regained power in the city.

== Cuban involvement ==
In 1895, Broward, his brother, and an associate began building a new steamboat, The Three Friends. Located on Fort George Island, the proprietors of the boat-building company were John Joseph Daly and Charles Scammell. During the construction, Cuban insurgents began fighting for independence from Spain. Broward was approached by a prominent member of Jacksonville's Cuban community about shipping a load of munitions and some Cuban expatriates from Nassau to Cuba. Broward agreed, and in January 1896, The Three Friends shipped out of Jacksonville on her maiden voyage, bound for Cuba.

Broward continued this military filibustering operation until President William McKinley declared war on Spain. Several times Broward was nearly caught and destroyed by Spanish gunboats. Aware of Broward's identity, the Spanish ambassador to the United States demanded that the American be stopped and his ship impounded. U.S. authorities tried to catch him, but Broward eluded them by loading The Three Friends under cover of darkness in secluded locations, hiding her behind larger ships as she left the St. Johns, and picking up Cubans and munitions from other ships at various points near the mouth of the river. Except when trying to evade capture, Broward never pretended not to be a filibusterer. He gained notoriety around the state for his daring deeds. However, Broward did take precautions against having his cargo intercepted by the Spanish, such as concealing arms and munitions inside shipments of groceries to the island.

== Return to politics ==
In 1896, the Straightouts offered to nominate Broward for sheriff, but he was busy with his filibustering operation and declined. In 1900, the war ended and his filibustering days were over.

Broward accepted the Democratic nomination for the State House and was elected almost without opposition. In the House, Broward supported many progressive initiatives, including a state dispensary bill and a law allowing insanity as grounds for divorce (at the request of powerful developer Henry Flagler). The most important law he supported was the Primary Election Law.

Broward had long supported a primary election system to replace the state's convention system, which was controlled by a small clique headed by Flagler. A strong law was drawn up in the House, which Broward enthusiastically supported, but after the Senate weakened the bill substantially, he withdrew his support. The bill passed anyway.

Broward was not naïve when it came to politics. As a Straightout and a supporter of the "common man," Broward naturally opposed Flagler's control of the party nominating system in the state. It tended to produce Democratic candidates from the Anti faction. As Florida had disfranchised most blacks and was essentially a one-party state, Anti control of the party nominating system effectively meant Anti control of the state government. Broward was smart enough to sponsor Flagler's requested divorce bill, but still wanted to wrest power from the big man.

== Campaign for governor ==
Broward did not run for the House again in 1902 because he was busy with a salvage operation in the Keys. During the summer of 1903, he decided to run for the governorship, as he had been approached numerous times during the spring and the summer about running for the office. As the party was hard pressed to find another liberal candidate, he agreed to run for office.

Broward was never wealthy, and in fact, frequently found himself in debt for one reason or another. The liberal forces in the state did not have great financial backing, while the conservative forces controlled most of the money and most of the newspapers in the state, as well as the major cities.

Broward said of his chances,

"I don't intend to go after the cities. Their newspapers are against me and they don't take me seriously. But I'm going to stump every crossroads village between Fernandina and Pensacola and talk to the farmers and the crackers and show them their top ends were meant to be used for something better than hatracks. I'm going to make 'em sit up and think. They won't mind mistakes in grammar if they find I'm talking horse sense."

Broward began campaigning immediately. His strongest opponent was Robert W. Davis, the railroad (and hence Flagler) candidate, while the two other candidates presented smaller threats. Broward hit Davis early and throughout the election for being a railroad man. Davis and the city newspapers generally derided Broward as an idiot as well as a liberal whose time had passed.

The greatest issue in the campaign was Everglades drainage, a program first examined by the sitting governor, William S. Jennings. Broward came out strongly in favor of drainage, calling the ground "the fabulous muck." While campaigning, he carried an elevation map of the various parts of the Everglades. If Broward found that he was losing an argument over drainage, he would point to his map and say, "Water will run downhill!"

Davis and Broward easily moved ahead into the second primary, and the campaign grew fiercer, with Davis at one point saying, "Mr. Broward is a man of but little ability and no intellectual brilliance whatever!" Broward used Davis's congressional record to repeatedly attack his voting in support of his railroad ties. Broward appealed to few urban voters and no business interests, while Davis could not win support among farmers or rural voters. On election day, Broward's rural voters gave him the primary victory by only 600 votes out of 45,000. The general election some weeks later was uneventful, and Broward was inaugurated on January 3, 1905.

== Governorship ==
Broward's biggest push as governor was for drainage of the Everglades, then considered useless swamp, as white settlers did not understand its ecology or relation to water table and habitat. Early in his term, Broward was attacked often and by many different people for his drainage program and for the land tax he instituted to pay for it. One newspaper noted, "The treasury will be drained before the Everglades." As drainage progressed, Broward began taking his fiercest opponents for "ocular displays" in the Glades, showing them the work that had been done and how it was progressing. John Beard, one of Broward's most effective opponents, was eventually convinced by one of these trips that the land was fertile and that drainage was working. Broward retaliated against Frank Stoneman, publisher of the predecessor of the Miami Herald who opposed the drainage, by refusing to certify his election as circuit judge.

Broward gained national prominence through this massive program. As his administration progressed, Broward became more involved with legislators and officials in Washington, gaining federal funds for the drainage project. Eventually, he brought President Teddy Roosevelt down to the Glades for a trip through the drainage areas. Roosevelt was an avid supporter of drainage and became an important advocate for the program.

Broward tackled other problems, as well – he worked to emphasize education and upgrade the state universities. His appointees assessed them as not offering much beyond the high-school level. He also helped guide a reorganization bill through the legislature that closed some of the schools and set up a commission to determine where the remaining schools should be located. A fight ensued about where to locate the major state university, which at the time was in Lake City. The Control Board (consisting of Broward and the cabinet) eventually selected Gainesville as the new site for the flagship state university. Residents in both cities complained that the commission members had been bought off.

Broward introduced a bill to the legislature in 1905 directing the state to provide life insurance for its citizens, and setting up an Insurance Commission and a cabinet-level post to go along with the program. The legislature voted the bill down with little debate. Broward supported measures to create a state textbook commission, reform the state hospital system, regulate the accounting profession, and make the state's Railroad Commission permanent.

In December 1907, U.S. Senator Stephen R. Mallory, Jr. died suddenly and Broward appointed William James Bryan, Mallory's campaign manager and already a candidate for the seat, to fill the vacancy. Newspapers criticized his selection of Bryan, who was only 31 at the time. The Tampa Tribune wrote, "If Mr. Bryan has given any symptoms of being worthy of this distinction then we are utterly at a loss to know it; it must be a weighty secret hidden in the governor's brain."

== After the governorship ==
In February 1908, Senator Bryan contracted typhoid fever and died in March, shocking the state. Broward appointed William Hall Milton to the post. Milton pledged not to run for the seat in November, but Broward soon announced that he was a candidate, an arrangement that was much-criticized, but took to the stump against his opponents, among them were his old adversary John Beard, along with a former political ally, Jacksonville mayor Duncan U. Fletcher. Beard and Fletcher attacked Broward throughout the campaign, but the former governor prevailed in the first primary, and entered the second primary campaign against Fletcher.

Broward's friend John Stockton advanced to the second primary in the governor's race, against General Albert Gilchrist of Fort Myers. Fletcher was an old liberal, and though now more conservative than Broward, the two men still agreed on many things. Gilchrist was much feared as a railroad man. Broward campaigned as much for Stockton for governor as he did for himself.

Broward and Stockton both lost. Newspapers statewide loudly proclaimed the end of the Broward era, and the Everglades drainage project seemed doomed, but Broward was not through. The 1908 Democratic National Convention was to be held shortly in Denver, and Broward planned to attend. For months, Broward was mentioned in newspapers throughout the South as a potential candidate for the vice presidency, and he was nationally known for his drainage work and for his earlier filibustering. Upon arrival in Denver, he was greeted by banners reading: "Bryan, Broward, and Bread." An editorial in the Denver Post spoke very favorably of him, concluding that he was an excellent choice for the position. Presidential nominee William Jennings Bryan telegraphed from his home, that he wanted a Midwesterner, rather than a Southerner. Although the crowd at the convention continued to back Broward, Bryan was able to name his own candidate.

The 1908 election results were not all bad for Broward. Fletcher as senator was still a mild progressive and maintained his long friendship with Broward. Gilchrist proved to be much more liberal in the role of governor and became an avid supporter of draining the Everglades.

In 1910, James Taliaferro's Senate seat was up for election. Big-city newspapers endorsed Taliaferro for re-election, but Broward soon entered the race against him. The race, expected to be an exciting showdown, proved to be such a bore that election news was pushed off the front page by coverage of Halley's Comet. Broward and Taliaferro entered the second primary after a quiet election.

The second primary campaign proved scarcely more interesting, though Broward took to the stump, traveling throughout the state. After an exciting election-eve rally at which Broward's supporters got so carried away that Taliaferro left in disgust, Broward pulled out a victory.

Exhausted by the campaign, Broward retired with his family to his home on Fort George Island near Jacksonville. Late in September, Broward fell ill with gallstones, which had been a concern for some months, though Broward had been too busy for surgery. He was in the hospital for a few days, and died just before he was to enter surgery. He was buried on October 4.

The Florida Times-Union wrote,

Today there are thousands who, like the 'Times-Union,' always opposed the big man so recently crowned with laurel and now clothed in a shroud, who see so clearly the qualities that all admired, that past differences refuse to intrude, and the opponent craves a place among the mourners.

The main aspect of his legacy was the draining of the Everglades, now recognized as perhaps the biggest environmental folly in American history. Broward's supporters however believe these efforts were integral to establishing the Florida citrus industry as an international powerhouse.

== Views on race ==
Called "An arms smuggler as well as a racist," in 1907 Broward proposed that every black person be physically evicted from the state. According to the Sun-Sentinel, Broward was "an unapologetic segregationist."

In September, 2017, a Broward County lawyer, Bill Gelin, published an excerpt of a forgotten document that Broward wrote during his term and may have delivered as a speech. He called upon Congress "to purchase territory, either domestic or foreign, and provide means to purchase the property of the negroes at a reasonable price and to transport them to the territory purchased by the United States," similar to the goals of the American Colonization Society. Whites would not be allowed to live in the new nation, and blacks would not be allowed to return to live in the United States. "The white people have no time to make excuses for the shortcomings of the negro," he said. "And the negro has less inclination to work for one and be directed by one he considers exacting, to the extent that he must do a good day's work or pay for the bill of goods sold to him."

These remarks prompted a series of voices to call for removal of the statue of Broward from the Broward County Courthouse. County Mayor Barbara Sharief said she "would be open to discussion about renaming the county if it's what people want to do," although she said shortly afterward that "we're not considering that at this time" and "I don't even want to go down that road."

The statue was removed during the night of October 18–19, 2017, and placed in storage.

== Legacy ==
Named for Broward:

- The Napoleon Bonaparte Broward (Dames Point) Bridge in Jacksonville, Florida
- More than 30 roads in Florida, notably, Florida State Road 842, locally known in the Fort Lauderdale area as Broward Boulevard.
- A residence hall at Florida State University
- A residence hall at University of Florida is named for his wife Annie Isabell Broward.
- Broward County, Florida
- Lake Broward, in Putnam County

== Archives ==
The George A. Smathers Libraries at the University of Florida, Gainesville, has a collection of Broward archival records, described as "The Broward Papers date from 1879 to 1918, but the bulk of the papers coincide with the gubernatorial term from 1905 to 1909. The major subject covered in the collection is the drainage of the Everglades and the development of South Florida lands. Additional topics include real estate, race relations, education, labor unions, liquor, taxes, transportation, waterways, railways, and Broward's campaigns for governor and the U.S. Senate. The collection comprises incoming and outgoing correspondence, speeches, news clippings, campaign material, photographs (including images of dredging operations), legislative material, and legal documents. There are a small number of articles, pamphlets, circulars, and other publications pertaining to the drainage of the Everglades, dredging equipment, forestry, sugar, and waterways. In addition to the incoming and outgoing correspondence, there are four bound letterbooks containing letters written by Broward in 1905-1909. Correspondents include numerous real estate developers, business leaders, representatives of state and federal agencies, and Florida politicians such as William Sherman Jennings."

Party political offices
Preceded by William Sherman Jennings	Democratic nominee for Governor of Florida; 1904	Succeeded by Albert W. Gilchrist
Political offices
Preceded by William S. Jennings	Governor of Florida; January 3, 1905 – January 5, 1909	Succeeded by Albert W. Gilchrist
