= William Milton =

William Milton may refer to:

- William Henry Milton (1854–1930), rugby player and cricketer in South Africa who became Administrator of Southern Rhodesia from 1901 to 1914
- William Hall Milton (1864–1942), US Senator from Florida
