= Sanford and Lake Eustis Railway =

Historic railroad in Florida

Overview
- Locale: Central Florida
- Successor: Plant System; Atlantic Coast Line Railroad; Seaboard Coast Line Railroad

Technical
- Track gauge: 4 ft 8 1/2 in (1,435 mm) standard gauge
- Previous gauge: 4 ft 9 in (1,448 mm)

The Sanford and Lake Eustis Railway was a historic railroad that ran from Sanford, Florida west to the town of Tavares on Lake Eustis, a distance of 28 miles. The line served as a branch of the Jacksonville, Tampa and Key West Railway, a Plant System railroad, that later became part of the Atlantic Coast Line Railroad.

== History ==
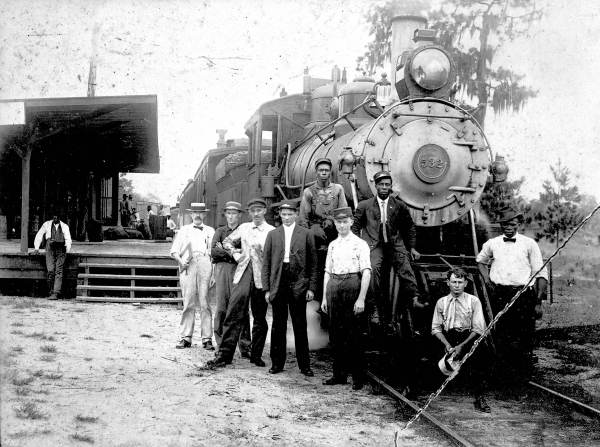
Train on the Sanford and Lake Eustis Railway at Sorrento depot

The line from Tavares to Mt. Dora was chartered as the Sanford & Lake Eustis Railway Co. in 1885. Dr. J.N. Bishop of Sanford had formed the company and was president of the railroad. Construction began in Sanford in 1885 and its rails passed through Sylvan Lake, Sorrento, and Mount Dora before reaching Tavares in 1887. The line crossed the Orange Belt Railway in Sylvan Lake and was constructed to 4 ft 9 in (1,448 mm) gauge. It was immediately leased to the Jacksonville, Tampa and Key West Railway Company upon its completion in 1877. The Jacksonville, Tampa and Key West Railway merged it into their Jacksonville to Sanford system in 1890 and operated it as their Lake Eustis Branch.

The Jacksonville, Tampa and Key West Railway went into bankruptcy in 1893 and was operated by a receiver until 1899. The receiver leased the system to the Plant Investment Company in 1899 and it was then operated as the Lake Eustis Division of the Plant System. It was sold to the Plant System in 1900 and fully merged into Plant's Savannah, Florida and Western Railroad where it remained until his death.

Plant's family had no interest in his railroad empire and sold it to the Atlantic Coast Line Railroad in 1902. The Atlantic Coast Line designated it as their TA Branch. Along with the St. Johns and Lake Eustis Railway, it would also be designated as the Leesburg Branch. By 1915, the Atlantic Coast Line operated two daily passenger trains round-trip on the line. By 1922, service was increased with four daily mixed trains (both passengers and freight). Additional trains running down the Atlantic Coast Line's Trilby Branch (the former Orange Belt Railway) would also run the line between Sanford to Sylvan Lake. By 1949, only one mixed train was running the full line six days a week from Sanford to Leesburg. Passenger service on the line ended in 1950.

The Atlantic Coast Line Railroad operated the line until 1967 when they merged with the Seaboard Air Line to form the Seaboard Coast Line Railroad. The line was abandoned from Sylvan Lake, 6 miles west of Sanford, to Sorrento, 13 miles, in 1980. Then in 1983 the 6 miles from Sanford to Sylvan Lake was abandoned.

Today, the line is still in service from Sorrento to Tavares and is now operated by the Florida Central Railroad. The Seminole-Wekiva Trail runs on some of the former right of way near Sylvan Lake.

== Historic stations ==
Milepost	City	Station	Connections and notes
ATA 766.7	Sanford	Sanford	junction with: Jacksonville, Tampa and Key West Railway Main Line (ACL); South Florida Railroad (ACL)
ATA 771.0		New Upsala	
ATA 772.0		Twin Lakes	
ATA 773.5		Sylvan Lake	junction with Orange Belt Railway (ACL)
ATA 774.0		Paola	
ATA 775.8		Markham	
ATA 778.8		Ethel	
ATA 781.8		Cassia	
ATA 784.8	Mount Plymouth	Mount Plymouth	
ATA 786.4	Sorrento	Sorrento	
ATA 792.4	Mount Dora	Mount Dora	
ATA 797.4	Tavares	Tavares	junction with: St. Johns and Lake Eustis Railway (ACL); Florida Central and Peninsular Railroad Orlando Division (SAL)
