= Florida Central Railroad (current) =

Short line railroad in Central Florida

Florida Central Railroad Company
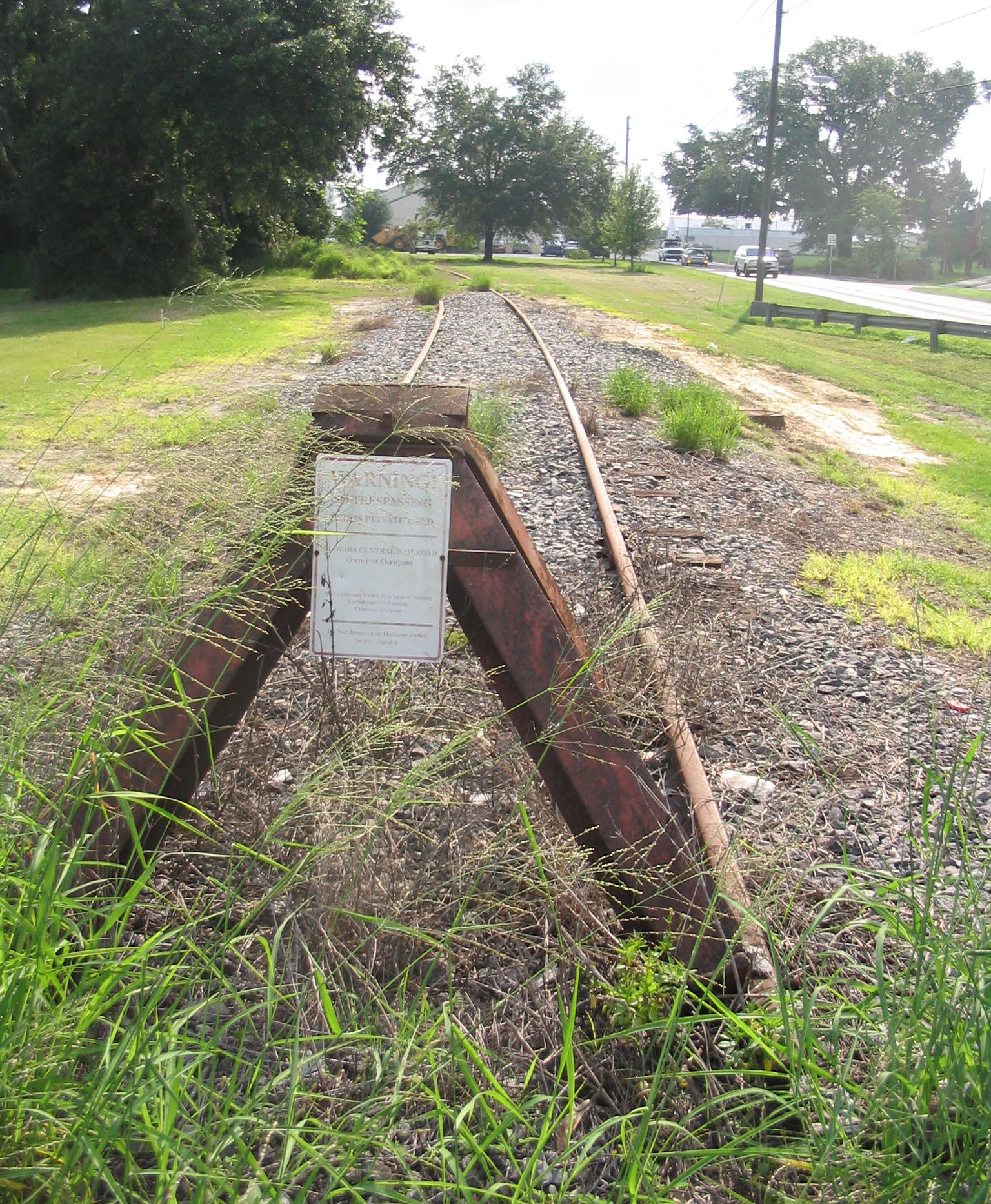
- The west end of the Florida Central's north line to Winter Garden

Overview
- Headquarters: Plymouth, Florida
- Reporting mark: FCEN
- Locale: northwest and west from Orlando, Florida
- Dates of operation: 1986–

Technical
- Track gauge: 4 ft 8 1/2 in (1,435 mm) standard gauge

Other
- Website: Official website

The Florida Central Railroad Company (reporting mark FCEN) is one of several short line railroads run by Regional Rail, LLC. It runs from downtown Orlando northwest to Apopka and Tavares with a branch from Toronto to Ocoee and Winter Garden and branches from Tavares to Umatilla and Sorrento. The Florida Central connects with the Central Florida Rail Corridor in downtown Orlando, Florida and has trackage rights on the CFRC from there south to Taft Yard where they interchange with CSX Transportation. The railroad is based out of the Plymouth freight station.

== History ==
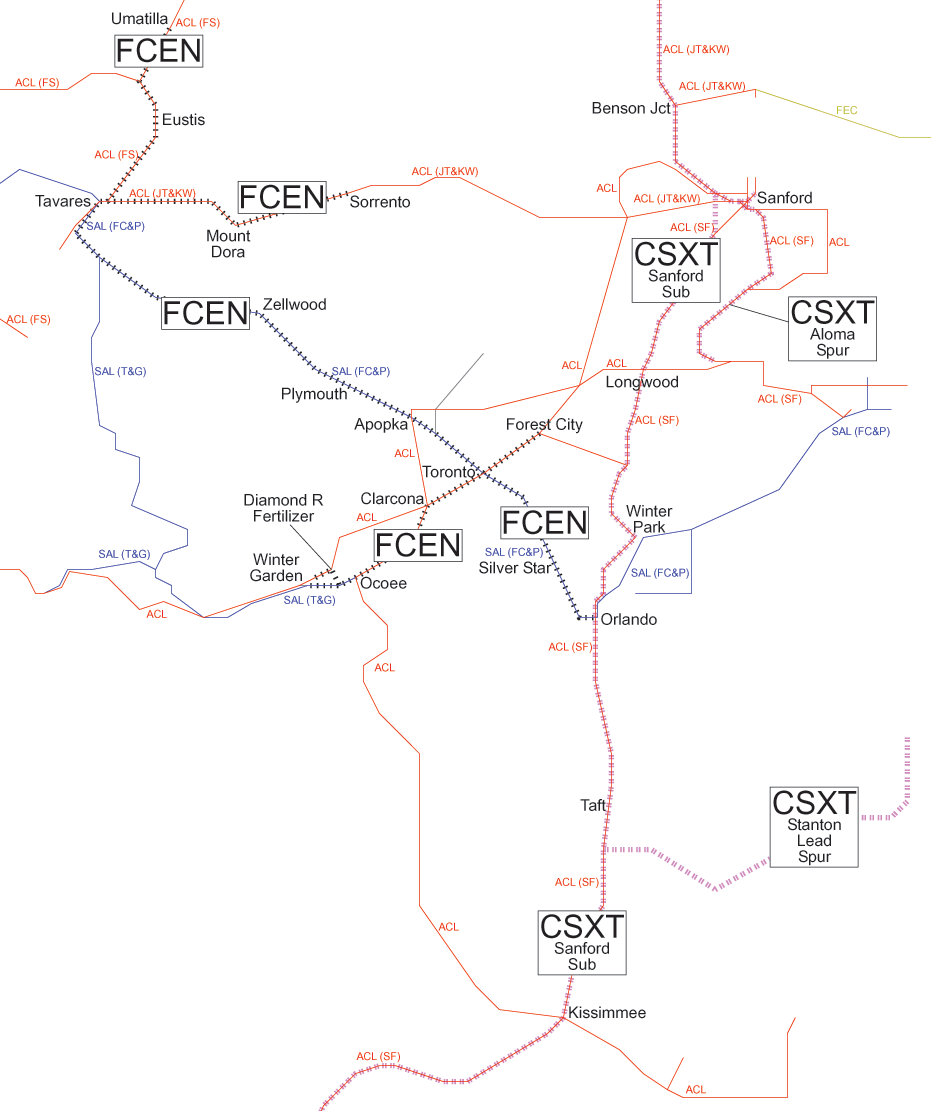
Current and former railroads in the Orlando area, including the Florida Central Railroad

The tracks that the Florida Central Railroad operate on were once part of a few independent railroads that were built mostly in the 1880s that were eventually merged into a single system.

=== Orlando to Tavares ===
The main route of the Florida Central Railroad from Tavares to Orlando was originally built by the Tavares, Orlando and Atlantic Railroad. It was incorporated in 1883, and built as an extension of the Leesburg and Indian River Railroad, which branched off the Florida Central and Peninsular Railroad in Wildwood and ran through Leesburg to Tavares. The FC&P leased the line in 1891, which became part of the Seaboard Air Line Railroad's Orlando Subdivision in 1900. This line west of Tavares west was abandoned in the 1970s. A wye on the CSX S Line (former Seaboard main line) near Wildwood Yard is what remains of the connection, though the south leg of that wye was removed by CSX in 2025.

=== Tavares to Umatilla ===
The Florida Central Railroad branch from Tavares to Umatilla was originally part of the St. Johns and Lake Eustis Railway. This company was chartered in 1879 and was completed in 1882-83. It extended as far north as Astor on the St. Johns River when it was first built. In 1893, the St. Johns & Lake Eustis Railway became part of the Plant System and was converted to standard gauge. The Plant System would become part of the Atlantic Coast Line Railroad in 1902.

=== Tavares to Sorrento ===
The branch from Tavares to Sorrento was part of the Sanford and Lake Eustis Railway which was completed in 1887. It extended as far east as Sanford when built. The line was immediately leased to the Jacksonville, Tampa and Key West Railway, which was part of the Plant System and subsequently, the Atlantic Coast Line Railroad. Track east of Sorrento to Sylvan Lake was abandoned in 1980.

=== Toronto to Winter Garden ===
The branch from Toronto to Winter Garden was built by the Orange Belt Railway from Toronto to Clarcona, and the Florida Midland Railway (not to be confused with Regional Rail, LLC's Florida Midland Railroad) from Clarcona to Ocoee. The Orange Belt Railway was completed in 1886 and the Florida Midland Railway was completed around the same time. Those lines would also become part of the Plant System and the Atlantic Coast Line Railroad. The line from Ocoee to Winter Garden was built by the Tavares and Gulf Railroad, which was a subsidiary of the Seaboard Air Line Railroad.

=== Later History ===
The Atlantic Coast Line and Seaboard Air Line Railroads merged in 1967 which brought all of the trackage under a single owner, the Seaboard Coast Line Railroad. In 1980, the Seaboard Coast Line's parent company merged with the Chessie System, creating the CSX Corporation. The CSX Corporation initially operated the Chessie and Seaboard Systems separately until 1986, when they were merged into CSX Transportation.

On November 21, 1986, the newly formed Florida Central Railroad Company, Incorporated leased the lines from CSX from Toronto west and each of the branches. The line from Toronto southeast to Orlando was still run by CSX until September 28, 1990, when the Florida Central Railroad leased the rest of the line from Toronto to the CSX A Line (now the Central Florida Rail Corridor) in Orlando.

On October 1, 1998, an agreement was signed between the railroad and other affected parties to abandon the line between Ocoee and Winter Garden west of Boyd Street, and the line to Diamond R Fertilizer west of 9th St, and build a new connector east of Winter Garden. This would eliminate grade crossings in downtown Winter Garden; trains had to go to the west end of downtown and then reverse direction along the other track to reach Diamond R Fertilizer. As the West Orange Trail was built before this, there is a fence separating it from the former railroad east of downtown Winter Garden.

On November 24, 2003, the Florida Central Railroad was granted an easement for a new connector track in the northwest corner at Toronto. Once this was built, the track crossing the mainline was removed, and the Forest City Branch was abandoned.

Renovations to 57 miles between the CSX connection in Orlando, and the terminus in Umatilla, Florida, began in September, 2013. The $18.4 million project received funding from various counties, the Florida Department of Transportation, FCEN itself, as well as a $2.2 million grant from the Federal Railroad Administration’s Rail Line Relocation program. The upgrades, which include replacing the current track with continuously welded rail, improving the bridge over the Dora Canal, improving grade crossings and tie replacement, as well as increase the speed limit of the line, from 10 mph to 25 mph. Upgrades to the line are in hopes of future commuter rail use, connecting Apopka, Tavares, and Orlando along FCEN track.

In November 2019, former owner Pinsly Railroad Company sold the Florida Central, along with the Florida Midland Railroad and Florida Northern Railroad, to 3i RR Holdings GP, LLC and subsidiaries (d.b.a. "Regional Rail, LLC").

On October 16, 2023, the Florida Central revealed a new logo and a new paint scheme that is closely based on the Seaboard Coast Line's logo and paint scheme.

== See also ==
- List of United States railroads
- List of Florida railroads
- Royal Palm Railway Experience
