= Orlando Subdivision =

Seaboard Air Line Railroad line in Florida

Overview
- Status: Some segments are still operating
- Owner: Seaboard Air Line Railroad
- Termini: Wildwood, Florida; Lake Charm, Florida

Technical
- Line length: 69.8 mi (112.3 km)
- Track gauge: 1,435 mm (4 ft 8 1/2 in) standard gauge
- Electrification: No
- Signalling: None

The Seaboard Air Line Railroad's Orlando Subdivision (T Line) was a rail line connecting the Seaboard Air Line's network to Orlando, Florida. Beginning at the Seaboard Air Line's main line in Wildwood, it ran southeast through Leesburg, Florida, Tavares, and Apopka to Orlando. From Orlando, the line continued northeast to Winter Park and Oviedo before coming to an end at Lake Charm.

== History ==
The Orlando Subdivision was built by predecessors of the Seaboard Air Line Railroad.

The Leesburg and Indian River Railroad was incorporated in 1884, and they built line from Wildwood east to Tavares, with plans to continue east to Titusville. That extension was not built, but pieces were built by other companies. The Leesburg and Indian River Railroad merged into the Florida Railway and Navigation Company in 1885. The Florida Railway and Navigation Company would become part of the Florida Central and Peninsular Railroad (FC&P) in 1886.

The Tavares, Orlando and Atlantic Railroad was incorporated in 1883, and built an extension from Tavares to Orlando. The FC&P leased the Tavares, Orlando and Atlantic Railroad in 1891.

The Orlando and Winter Park Railway was incorporated in 1886 and extended the line from Orlando to Winter Park. The Osceola and Lake Jesup Railway, incorporated 1888, continued the line past Oviedo to Lake Charm. In 1891 the two companies merged into the East Florida and Atlantic Railroad, which was leased by the FC&P in 1892.

In the line's early days, the FC&P's passenger trains served the historic Church Street Station in Orlando, which belonged to the South Florida Railroad. Trains would turn on to the South Florida Railroad (which would become the main line of the Atlantic Coast Line Railroad, the Seaboard Air Line's competitor) in Downtown Orlando just north of the station. In 1896, the FC&P would build its own Orlando station, which would continue to be used by Seaboard.

The Seaboard Air Line Railway leased the Florida Central and Peninsular Railroad network on July 1, 1900, and it was merged into the former on August 15, 1903. The Seaboard Air Line would designate the line as the Orlando Subdivision. In the 1940s, Seaboard ran two round trip freight trains daily on the line from Wildwood to Orlando, with one of those trains continuing to Oviedo. They also operated one daily mixed train (both passengers and freight) daily from Wildwood to Orlando.

In 1967, the Seaboard Air Line merged with their long-time rival, the Atlantic Coast Line Railroad (ACL). The Orlando Subdivision crossed some ACL branch lines between Wildwood and Orlando, and also connected with the ACL's main line in Orlando. After the merger was complete, the company was named the Seaboard Coast Line Railroad (SCL).

After the merger, the Orlando Subdivision was abandoned between Orlando and Aloma (just east of Winter Park). The remaining track from Aloma to Lake Charm became part of the Aloma Subdivision, which also included the former ACL line from Sanford to Oviedo. The line between Wildwood and Orlando remained intact until the 1970s when tracks were removed between Leesburg and Tavares.

== Current conditions ==
Since 1986, the remaining line from Tavares to Orlando has been operated by the Florida Central Railroad, a short line that was run by the Pinsly Railroad Company from 1986 to 2019 and is now operated by Regional Rail, LLC.

The Florida Midland Railroad, another Pinsly-operated short line, operated the segment from Wildwood to Leesburg from 1987 until 2005, when most of that end of the line was abandoned. All that remains on the Wildwood end is a short wye which CSX uses to turn locomotives from Wildwood Yard, though the south leg of that wye was removed by CSX in 2025.

== Historic stations ==
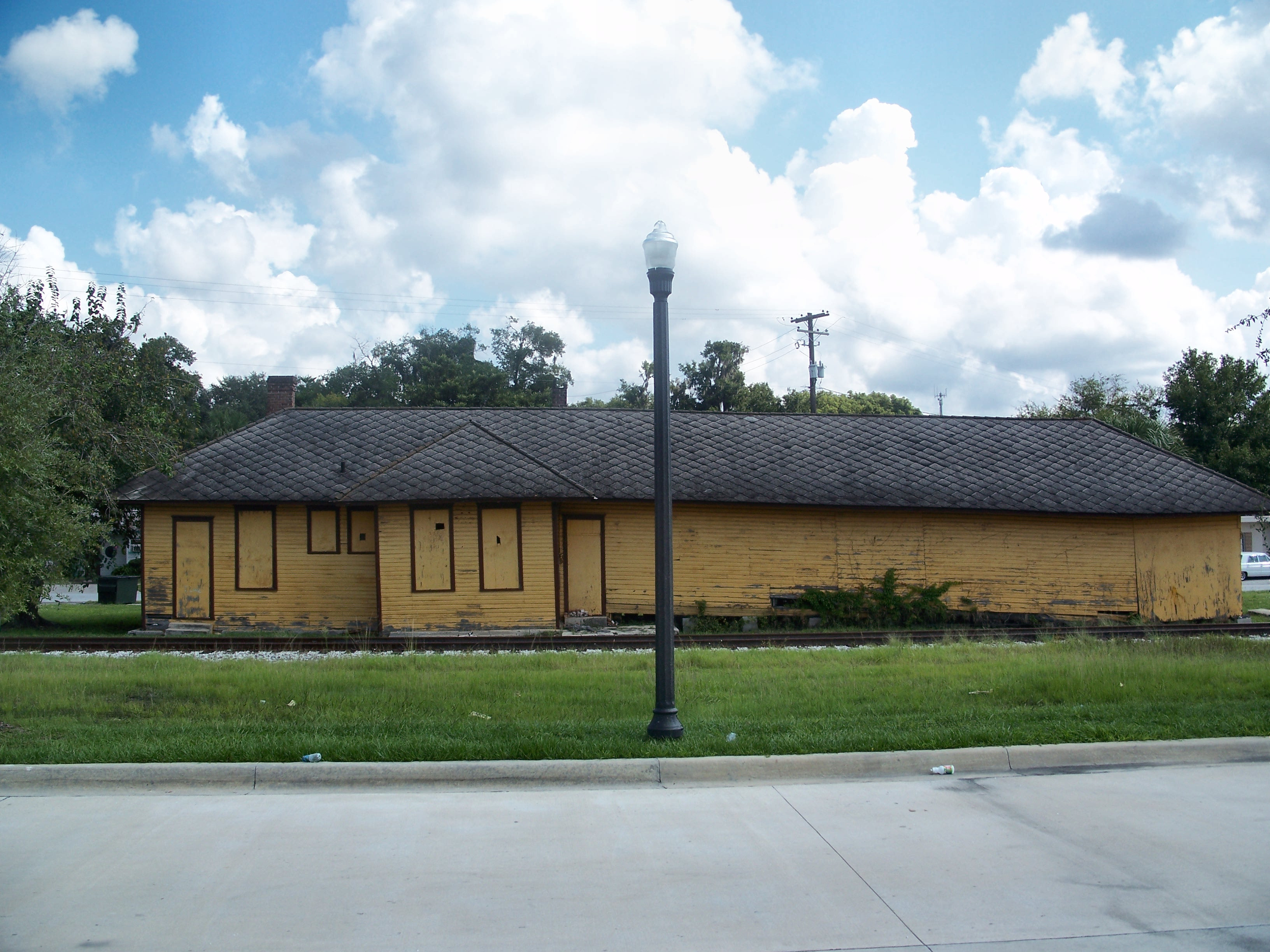
Former Apopka depot, which still stands

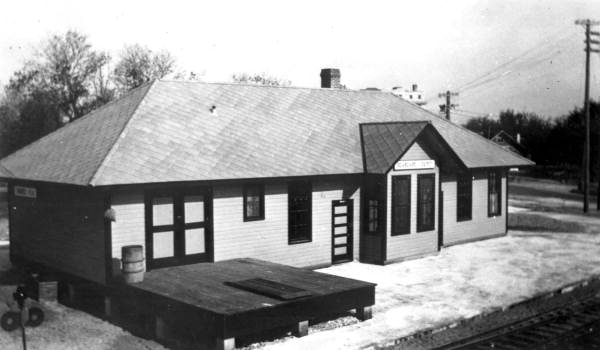
Former Tavares depot

Milepost	City/Location	Station	Connections and notes
ST 761.2	Wildwood	Wildwood	junction with Seaboard Air Line Railroad Main Line
ST 768.9		Whitney	
ST 770.4		Montclair	
ST 772.8	Leesburg	Leesburg	junction with: Atlantic Coast Line Railroad High Springs—Croom Line & Leesburg Branch
ST 783.2	Tavares	Tavares	junction with St. Johns and Lake Eustis Railway (ACL)
ST 786.8		Ellsworth	junction with Tavares and Gulf Railroad (SAL)
ST 790.8		Lake Jem	
ST 793.7		Alpha	
ST 794.7	Zellwood	Zellwood	
ST 796.2		McDonald	
ST 798.7	Plymouth	Plymouth	
ST 802.0	Apopka	Apopka	junction with Atlantic Coast Line Railroad Florida Midland Branch
ST 805.7	Lockhart	Toronto	junction with Atlantic Coast Line Railroad Trilby Branch
ST 807.7	Lockhart	Lockhart	
ST 811.4	Fairvilla	Fairvilla	
ST 812.1		Modello Park	
ST 815.0	Orlando	Orlando	junction with Atlantic Coast Line Railroad Main Line
ST 819.4	Winter Park	Winter Park	
ST 821.5		Aloma	
ST 823.8	Goldenrod	Goldenrod	
ST 830.1	Oviedo	Oviedo	junction with Sanford and Indian River Railroad (SFRR/ACL)
ST 831.0		Lake Charm	

== See also ==
- Main Line (Seaboard Air Line Railroad)
