= 1904 Florida gubernatorial election =

- November 8, 1904
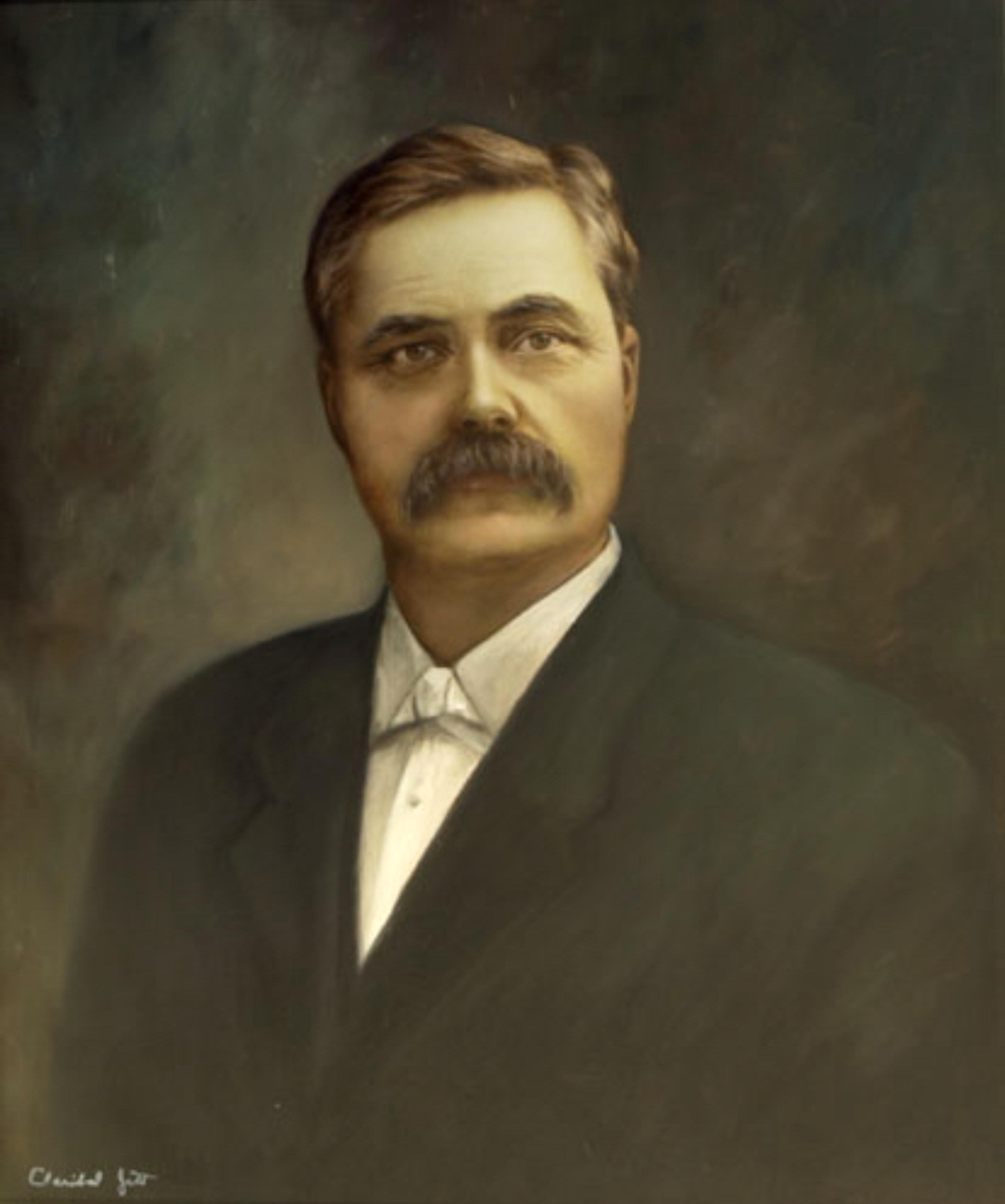

Nominee	Napoleon B. Broward	Matthew B. MacFarlane
Party	Democratic	Republican
Popular vote	28,971	6,357
Percentage	79.16%	17.37%

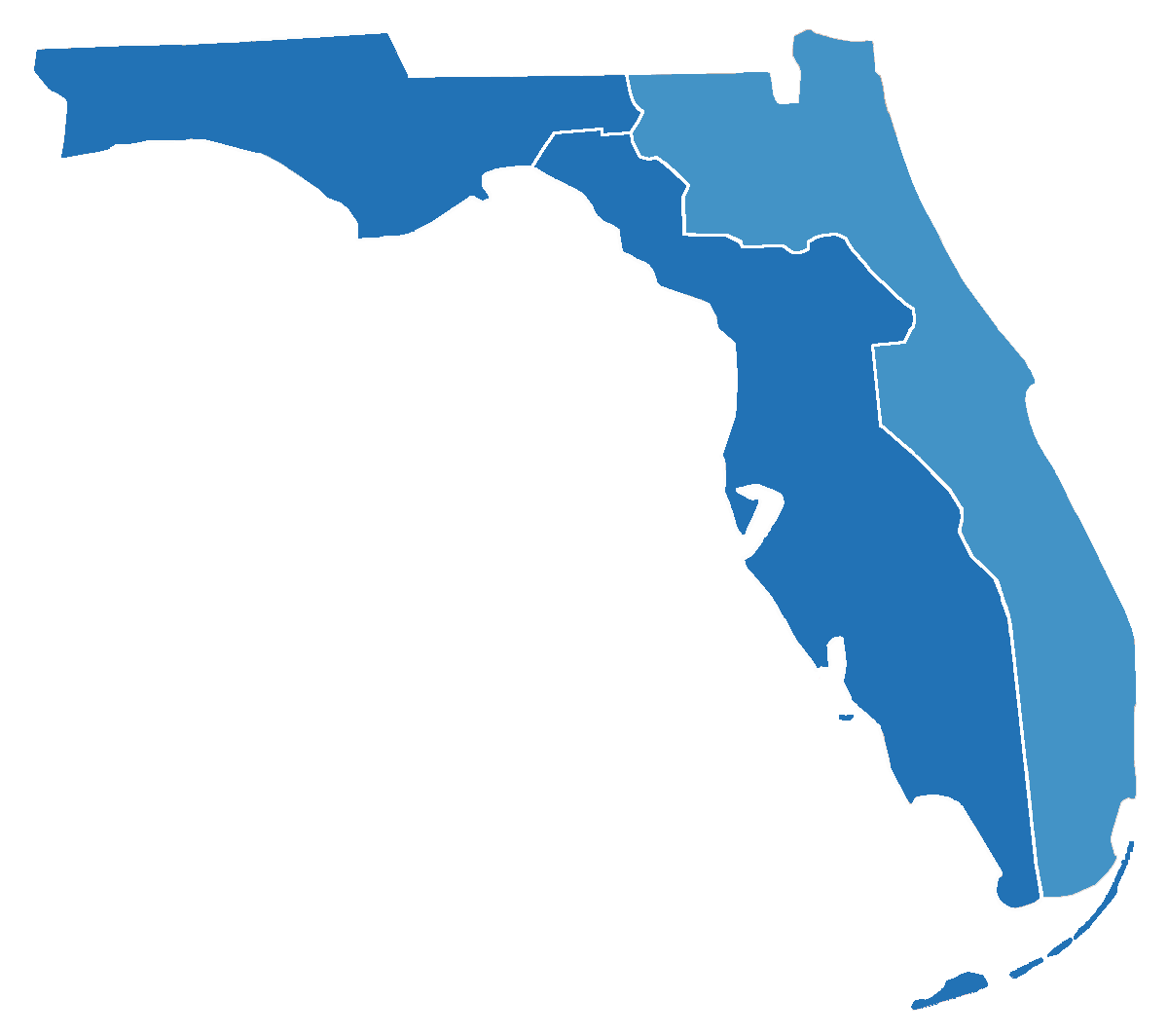
Broward
60–70%
70–80%
80–90%
>90%
Governor before election
William Sherman Jennings
Democratic
Elected Governor
Napoleon B. Broward
Democratic

The 1904 Florida gubernatorial election was held on November 8, 1904. Democratic nominee Napoleon B. Broward defeated Republican nominee Matthew B. MacFarlane with 79.16% of the vote.

== General election ==
=== Candidates ===
Major party candidates

- Napoleon B. Broward, Democratic, former Sheriff of Duval County, member of the Jacksonville City Council and the Florida Board of Health
- Matthew B. MacFarlane, Republican, unsuccessful 1900 candidate for Governor, US Customs Service collector in Tampa, former Tampa City Council member

Other candidates

- W.R. Healey, Socialist, attorney, Socialist Party of Florida Secretary and vice president of the Florida Federation of Labor

=== Results ===
1904 Florida gubernatorial election
Party	Candidate	Votes	%	±%
Democratic	Napoleon B. Broward	28,971	79.16%	−1.82%
Republican	Matthew B. MacFarlane	6,357	17.37%	+0.10%
Socialist	W.R. Healey	1,270	3.47%	
Majority		22,614		
Turnout				
Democratic hold		Swing		

==== Results by County ====
County	Napoleon B. Broward Democratic		Matthew B. MacFarlane Republican		W. R. Healey Socialist		Total Votes
County	#	%	#	%	#	%	Total Votes
Alachua	1,235	71.76%	455	26.44%	31	1.80%	1,721
Baker	356	84.56%	45	10.69%	20	4.75%	421
Bradford	560	82.47%	110	16.20%	9	1.33%	679
Brevard	653	86.03%	94	12.38%	12	1.58%	759
Calhoun	300	79.58%	65	17.24%	12	3.18%	377
Citrus	388	93.95%	18	4.36%	7	1.69%	413
Clay	250	83.89%	48	16.11%	0	0.00%	298
Columbia	687	72.24%	251	26.39%	13	1.37%	951
Dade	919	75.20%	249	20.38%	54	4.42%	1,222
DeSoto	711	80.98%	153	17.43%	14	1.59%	878
Duval	2,246	78.04%	553	19.21%	79	2.74%	2,878
Escambia	1,558	76.45%	442	21.69%	38	1.86%	2,038
Franklin	336	69.57%	141	29.19%	6	1.24%	483
Gadsden	488	95.50%	22	4.31%	1	0.20%	511
Hamilton	472	83.25%	85	14.99%	10	1.76%	567
Hernando	185	94.39%	5	2.55%	6	3.06%	196
Hillsborough	2,168	73.24%	592	20.00%	200	6.76%	2,960
Holmes	403	88.96%	39	8.61%	11	2.43%	453
Jackson	1,298	86.19%	172	11.42%	36	2.39%	1,506
Jefferson	473	84.16%	79	14.06%	10	1.78%	562
Lafayette	411	88.77%	52	11.23%	0	0.00%	463
Lake	534	79.70%	116	17.31%	20	2.99%	670
Lee	321	68.15%	31	6.58%	119	25.27%	471
Leon	661	87.90%	84	11.17%	7	0.93%	752
Levy	458	82.97%	81	14.67%	13	2.36%	552
Liberty	164	87.70%	23	12.30%	0	0.00%	187
Madison	605	93.94%	34	5.28%	5	0.78%	644
Manatee	623	79.67%	86	11.00%	73	9.34%	782
Marion	1,095	84.75%	143	11.07%	54	4.18%	1,292
Monroe	807	74.38%	229	21.11%	49	4.52%	1,085
Nassau	521	77.07%	145	21.45%	10	1.48%	676
Orange	848	72.48%	274	23.42%	48	4.10%	1,170
Osceola	250	83.06%	45	14.95%	6	1.99%	301
Pasco	463	90.08%	40	7.78%	11	2.14%	514
Polk	885	88.50%	83	8.30%	32	3.20%	1,000
Putnam	512	61.69%	291	35.06%	27	3.25%	830
Santa Rosa	459	92.73%	15	3.03%	21	4.24%	495
St. Johns	558	68.13%	182	22.22%	79	9.65%	819
Sumter	338	86.89%	45	11.57%	6	1.54%	389
Suwannee	608	87.36%	77	11.06%	11	1.58%	696
Taylor	251	80.19%	59	18.85%	3	0.96%	313
Volusia	690	70.48%	245	25.03%	44	4.49%	979
Wakulla	198	81.48%	33	13.58%	12	4.94%	243
Walton	440	69.40%	181	28.55%	13	2.05%	634
Washington	585	77.08%	145	19.10%	29	3.82%	759
Actual Totals	28,971	79.18%	6,357	17.37%	1,261	3.45%	36,589
Official Totals	28,971	79.16%	6,357	17.37%	1,270	3.47%	36,598
