= St. Johns and Lake Eustis Railway =

Historic railroad in Florida

Overview
- Locale: Central Florida
- Dates of operation: 1879–1896
- Successor: Plant System; Atlantic Coast Line Railroad; Seaboard Coast Line Railroad

Technical
- Track gauge: 4 ft 8 1/2 in (1,435 mm) standard gauge
- Previous gauge: 4 ft 9 in (1,448 mm)

The St. Johns and Lake Eustis Railway was a historic railroad in northern Central Florida. It ran from Astor on the St. Johns River south to Fort Mason and along Lake Eustis to Tavares and Lane Park. It also had track from Fort Mason to Leesburg, where it connected to the Florida Southern Railway.

== History ==
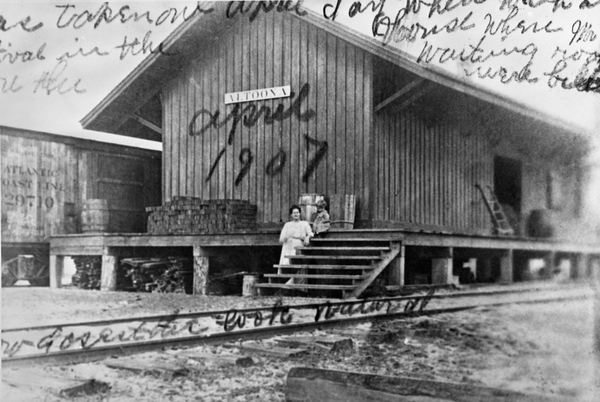
Former Altoona depot

The St. Johns and Lake Eustis Railway was chartered in 1879 and construction started at Astor on the St. Johns River. The line was built 3 ft (914 mm) narrow gauge and its rails passed through Altoona, Umatilla, and Fort Mason before reaching Eustis, 27 miles, in 1880. Construction continued southward through Tavares, reaching Lane Park on Big Lake Harris, 7.5 miles, in 1882–83. The line was then extended 15 miles from Fort Mason, around the north and west sides of Lake Eustis to Leesburg in 1884. The line originally served as a land bridge for the river and lake steamboats that provided transportation into the interior of Florida. Passengers and freight could come down the St. Johns River on steamboats from Jacksonville and transfer to the railroad at Astor for ports on Lakes Eustis, Dora and Harris. They could then transfer back to a lake steamer to continue to points further south.

The St. Johns and Lake Eustis Railway was leased to the Florida Southern Railway, a 3 ft (914 mm) narrow gauge system, from 1885 to 1889 and subleased to the Jacksonville, Tampa and Key West Railway from 1889 to 1890. The lease was cancelled in 1890 and the St. Johns and Lake Eustis Railway resumed operations until 1893. They went into bankruptcy in 1893 and were operated by a receiver until they were sold to the Plant System in 1896. Railroad tycoon Henry Plant reorganized it as the St. Johns and Lake Eustis Railroad and immediately converted the tracks to standard gauge. It was operated as a part of his Plant System as the Savannah, Florida & Western Railroad Company until his death. His family, having no interest in his railroad empire, sold it to the Atlantic Coast Line Railroad in 1902. The Atlantic Coast Line designated the line from Leesburg to Astor as the SC Branch and the line from Fort Mason to Lane Park as the SD Branch. The line from Leesburg to Tavares would also be known as the Leesburg Branch, which continued east to Sanford along the former Sanford and Lake Eustis Railway (also owned by the Atlantic Coast Line).

Abandonments began in 1941 with the portion of the line from Astor to Altoona, 17.7 miles. The line from Tavares to Lane Park, 1.5 miles, followed in 1942. Then in 1956 the portion from Altoona to Umatilla, 3 miles, was abandoned. These abandonments were due to a loss of a customer base.

By 1949, the Atlantic Coast Line was running only one mixed train six days a week on the remaining line from Tavares and Leesburg, which originated in Sanford.

The Atlantic Coast Line operated the line until 1967 when they merged with the Seaboard Air Line Railroad to form the Seaboard Coast Line Railroad. The line from Fort Mason to Leesburg, 15 miles, was abandoned in 1967 due to being redundant after the merger.

Today, the line is still in service between Umatilla and Tavares and is operated by the Florida Central Railroad. The segment between Leesburg and Fort Mason is now the Tav Lee Trail.

== Historic stations ==
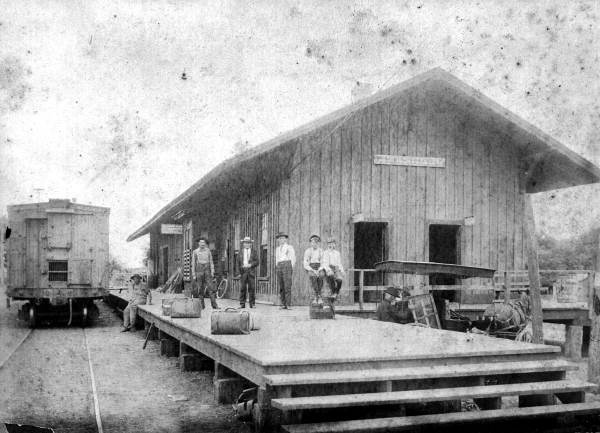
The Leesburg ACL Freight Depot at South Sixth Street around 1900.

A series of freight cars along the remnants of the tracks as seen from Florida State Road 19 in Dona Vista.

The former Umatilla Passenger Depot and Family Lines caboose, now the Umatilla Public Library, also seen from SR 19 in Umatilla.

Leesburg to Astor
Milepost	City	Station	Opening date	Connections and notes
ASC 802.5	Leesburg	Leesburg	1884	junction with: Florida Southern Railway (ACL); Florida Central and Peninsular Railroad Orlando Division (SAL)
	Lanier	Lanier		
	Orange Bend	Orange Bend		
ASC 811.0	Lisbon	Lisbon		
ASC 815.7	Fort Mason	Fort Mason	1880	junction with line to Lane Park
		St. Clair		
ASC 820.2	Umatilla	Umatilla		
	Umatilla	Glendale		
ASC 823.2	Altoona	Altoona		
	Pittman	Pittman		
		Ravenswood		
		Sellers Lake		
		Cummings		
ASC 840.9	Astor	Astor	1880	

Fort Mason to Lane Park
Milepost	City	Station	Opening date	Connections and notes
ASD 815.7	Fort Mason	Fort Mason	1880	junction with Leesburg to Astor Line
ASD 818.2	Eustis	Eustis		
		Mt. Homer		
ASD 821.8	Tavares	Tavares		junction with: Sanford and Lake Eustis Railway (ACL); Florida Central and Peninsular Railroad Orlando Division (SAL)
ASD 823.3	Tavares	Lane Park	1882	
