= Plymouth, Florida =

Unincorporated community in Florida, US

Plymouth
- Unincorporated community
- Location within the state of Florida Plymouth (the United States)
- Coordinates: 28°41′32″N 81°32′50″W
- Country: United States
- State: Florida
- County: Orange
- Time zone: UTC-5 (EST)
  - Summer (DST): UTC-4 (EDT)
- ZIP code: 32768

Plymouth is an unincorporated area in Orange County, Florida, United States, northwest of downtown Apopka along US 441 (SR 500, Orange Blossom Trail), at the intersection with Plymouth-Sorrento Road. It features the Pinsly Railroad Company's Florida headquarters and part of the Florida Central Railroad. It is statistically part of the greater Orlando area.

== Notable person ==
- Warren Sapp, professional football player, Tampa Bay Buccaneers and Oakland Raiders
