= Fort Mason, Florida =

- Unincorporated community
- Location within Florida Location within the United States
- Coordinates: 28°52′37″N 81°42′03″W
- Country: United States
- State: Florida
- County: Lake
- Elevation: 69 ft (21 m)
- Time zone: UTC-5 (Eastern (EST))
  - Summer (DST): UTC-4 (EDT)
- Area code: 352
- GNIS feature ID: 305696

Fort Mason is an unincorporated community in Lake County, Florida, United States. The community is located along Florida State Road 19 between Eustis and Dona Vista.

Fort Mason was the junction of the main line and the Lane Park branch of the St. Johns and Lake Eustis Railway, which was acquired by the Plant System in 1896 and the Atlantic Coast Line Railroad in 1902.

== Notable people ==
- Nathan Philemon Bryan, U.S. Senator from Florida and United States circuit judge for the Fifth Circuit, was born near Fort Mason. He was the brother of William James Bryan.
- William James Bryan, U.S. Senator from Florida, brother of Nathan Philemon Bryan.
