= Samuel Pasco =

American politician (1834–1917)

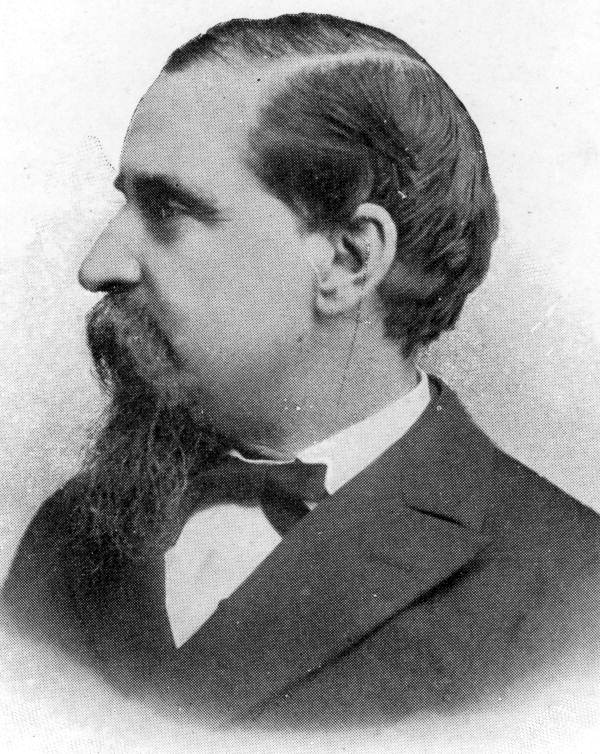
- Pasco in 1887

United States Senator from Florida
- In office May 19, 1887 – April 18, 1899
- Preceded by: Charles W. Jones
- Succeeded by: James Taliaferro

Member of the Florida House of Representatives
- In office 1886–1887

Clerk of the Circuit Court of Jefferson County
- In office 1866–1868

Personal details
- Born: June 28, 1834 London, England
- Died: March 13, 1917 (aged 82) Tampa, Florida, US
- Party: Democratic

Military service
- Allegiance: Confederate States of America
- Branch/service: Confederate States Army
- Rank: Sergeant
- Unit: 3rd Florida Infantry Regiment
- Battles/wars: American Civil War

Samuel Pasco (June 28, 1834 – March 13, 1917) was an American politician and Confederate soldier who served as a United States senator from Florida. He is the only Confederate private ever elected to the U.S. Senate.

== Early life and education ==
Pasco was born in London, England, to a family of Cornish ancestry. His family moved to Prince Edward Island in 1841 before moving to the United States in 1843 and settling in Charlestown, Massachusetts. Pasco attended Harvard University and then moved to Florida in 1859. He served as principal of the Waukeenah Academy, a school in Monticello, Florida, from 1860 to 1861.

== Career ==
=== Military career ===
When the American Civil War began, Pasco closed Waukeenah Academy and joined the army of the Confederate States of America in 1861. He fought as a member of the 3rd Florida Infantry Regiment. He was captured on Missionary Ridge in Chattanooga, Tennessee. Pasco was imprisoned by the Union for the rest of the war. He was released in March 1865 and immediately returned to Florida to resume his post as principal of the Waukeenah Academy. Soon after, Samuel Pasco became a clerk of Jefferson County from 1866 to 1868. He eventually became a prominent lawyer in the area.

=== Senate and Florida House of Representatives career ===
In 1885, he was the president of the convention which wrote a new constitution for Florida. He was a member of the Florida House of Representatives from 1886 to 1887 and briefly served as speaker in 1887.

In 1887, Pasco was elected to the U.S. Senate from Florida, as a member of the Democratic Party. He served in the Senate for two terms, until 1899, when he was defeated for reelection. Pasco then became a member of the Isthmian Canal Commission, which decided that a canal should be built through the isthmus of Panama. He remained on this commission until 1905.

== Death ==
Pasco then retired from public life and moved back to Monticello. He died in Tampa, Florida, and was buried in the Roseland cemetery in Monticello. Pasco County, Florida, is named for him.

== See also ==
- Florida's congressional delegations
- List of United States senators born outside the United States
- List of United States senators from Florida
- Pasco County, named after him.

== Sources ==
- United States Congress. "Samuel Pasco (id: P000095)". Biographical Directory of the United States Congress. Retrieved on 2008-02-14

U.S. Senate
Preceded by Charles W. Jones	U.S. senator (Class 1) from Florida; 1887–1899; Served alongside: Wilkinson Call, Stephen R. Mallory	Succeeded by James P. Taliaferro
