= James Taliaferro =

American politician (1847–1934)

James Piper Taliaferro
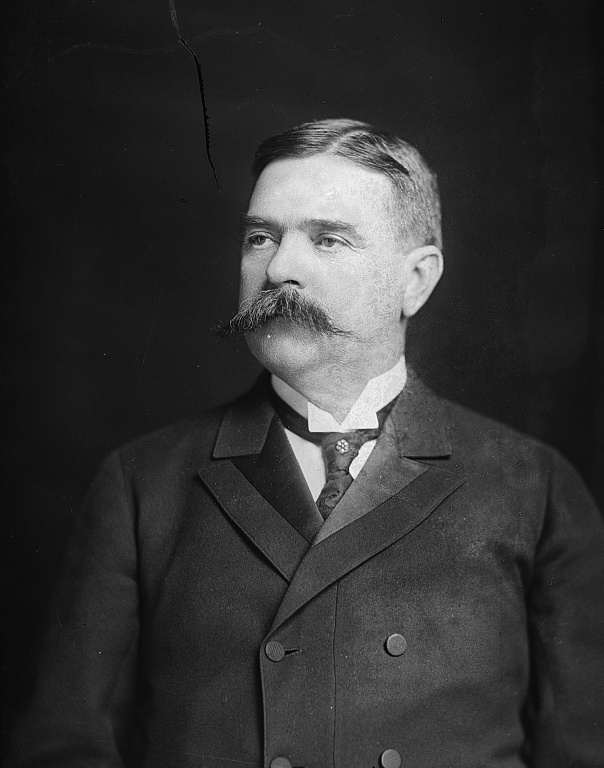

United States Senator from Florida
- In office April 20, 1899 – March 3, 1911
- Preceded by: Samuel Pasco
- Succeeded by: Nathan P. Bryan

Personal details
- Born: September 30, 1847 Orange, Virginia, US
- Died: October 6, 1934 (aged 87) Jacksonville, Florida, US
- Party: Democratic

Military service
- Allegiance: Confederate States of America
- Branch/service: Confederate Army
- Rank: Private
- Unit: 5th Virginia Cavalry

James Piper Taliaferro (September 30, 1847 – October 6, 1934) was a U.S. senator from Florida who served as a Democrat from 1899 to 1911.

== Biography ==
Taliaferro was born in Orange, Virginia. He attended the common schools and the William Dinwiddie School in Greenwood, Virginia. During the American Civil War, he enlisted in the Confederate Army in 1864 and served until the close of the war, when he resumed his studies in college. Subsequently, Taliaferro moved to Jacksonville, Florida, in 1866.

== Non-political work ==
Taliaferro engaged in the lumber business and other commercial enterprises; he also engaged in the building of railroads. Later president of the First National Bank of Tampa.

== Political career ==
Taliaferro was elected as a Democrat to the United States Senate to fill the vacancy in the term beginning March 4, 1899. He was appointed and subsequently reelected in 1905 and served from April 20, 1899, to March 3, 1911; but was an unsuccessful candidate for reelection in 1910. Taliaferro was chairman of the Committee on Revolutionary Claims (Sixtieth Congress) and the Committee on Corporations Organized in the District of Columbia (Sixty-first Congress).

He again resumed his former business and commercial pursuits in Jacksonville, Duval County, Florida, until 1920 when he retired from active business pursuits.

U.S. Senate
| Preceded by Samuel Pasco | U.S. senator (Class 1) from Florida; 1899–1911; Served alongside: Stephen Mallory, William James Bryan, William H. Milton, Duncan U. Fletcher | Succeeded by Nathan P. Bryan |
