= Stephen Mallory II =

American politician (1848–1907)

Stephen Russell Mallory Jr.
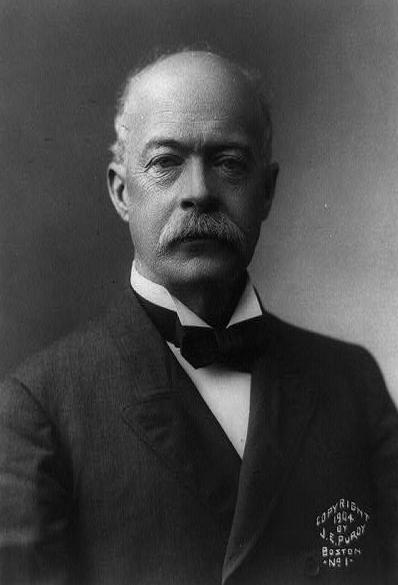

United States Senator from Florida
- In office May 15, 1897 – December 23, 1907
- Preceded by: Wilkinson Call
- Succeeded by: William J. Bryan

Member of the U.S. House of Representatives from Florida's 1st district
- In office March 4, 1891 – March 3, 1895
- Preceded by: Robert H. M. Davidson
- Succeeded by: Stephen M. Sparkman

Member of the Florida Senate
- In office 1880

Member of the Florida House of Representatives
- In office 1876

Personal details
- Born: November 2, 1848 Columbia, South Carolina, U.S.
- Died: December 23, 1907 (aged 59) Pensacola, Florida, U.S.
- Party: Democratic

Military service
- Allegiance: Confederate States of America
- Branch/service: Confederate States Army; Confederate States Navy
- Rank: Midshipman (navy)
- Battles/wars: American Civil War

Stephen Russell Mallory Jr. (November 2, 1848 – December 23, 1907) was a U.S. senator and U.S. representative from Florida who served as a Democrat. He was the son of U.S. Senator Stephen Russell Mallory of Florida.

He was born in 1848 in Columbia, South Carolina. His parents were Stephen Mallory, who was a future U.S. senator, and his wife Angela Moreno, who was from a wealthy Spanish family from Pensacola, Florida; the Mallorys soon returned to Florida, where his father had a successful political career.

During the American Civil War, Mallory entered the Confederate Army in the fall of 1864; he was appointed midshipman in the Confederate Navy in the spring of 1865 and served until the end of the war. He graduated from Georgetown College, Washington, D.C., in 1869, where he then served as instructor in Latin and Greek until 1871. He studied law, and was admitted to the bar in Louisiana in 1872 and commenced practice in New Orleans. In 1874, he moved to Pensacola and continued the practice of law. He was a member of the Florida House of Representatives in 1876 and of the Florida Senate in 1880, to which he was reelected in 1884. Mallory was elected as a Democrat to the Fifty-second United States Congress and Fifty-third United States Congress (March 4, 1891 – March 3, 1895), but was not a candidate for renomination in 1894. He was elected as a Democrat to the United States Senate in 1897, subsequently appointed and then elected to the Senate in 1903, and served from May 15, 1897, until his death in Pensacola, Florida, December 23, 1907. He was chairman of the Committee on Corporations Organized in the District of Columbia (Sixtieth United States Congress). He died in 1907 and was interred in St. Michael's Cemetery in Pensacola.

== See also ==
- List of members of the United States Congress who died in office (1900–1949)
- List of Hispanic and Latino Americans in the United States Congress

U.S. House of Representatives
Preceded by Robert H. M. Davidson	Member of the U.S. House of Representatives from Florida's 1st congressional district 1891–1895	Succeeded by Stephen M. Sparkman
U.S. Senate
Preceded by Wilkinson Call	U.S. senator (Class 3) from Florida; 1897–1907; Served alongside: Samuel Pasco, James P. Taliaferro	Succeeded by William J. Bryan
