= Stephen M. Sparkman =

American politician (1849–1929)

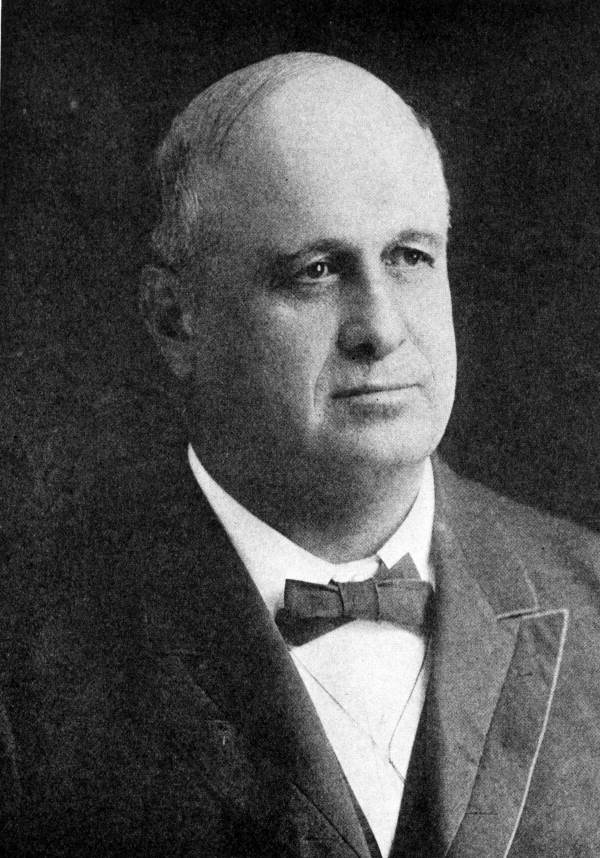

Member of the U.S. House of Representatives from Florida's 1st district
- In office March 4, 1895 – March 3, 1917
- Preceded by: Stephen Mallory II
- Succeeded by: Herbert J. Drane

Personal details
- Born: Stephen Milancthon Sparkman; July 29, 1849 Hernando County, Florida, U.S.
- Died: September 26, 1929 (aged 80) Washington, D.C., U.S.
- Party: Democratic

Stephen Milancthon Sparkman (July 29, 1849 – September 26, 1929) was a U.S. representative from Florida.

== Biography ==
Stephen M. Sparkman was born on a farm in Hernando County, Florida, on July 29, 1849. He attended the common schools.

He taught school from 1867 to 1870. He studied law, and was admitted to the bar in 1872, commencing practice in Tampa, Florida.

He served as state's attorney for the sixth judicial circuit from 1878 to 1887. He declined the position of circuit judge for the sixth judicial circuit in 1888 and also the appointment of associate justice of the supreme court of the State in 1891. He served as member of the county Democratic executive committee 1890-1894 and served as chairman in 1890 and 1891. He served as member of the State Democratic executive committee 1892-1896, serving as chairman. He served as delegate to the Democratic National Convention in 1892.

Sparkman was elected as a Democrat to the Fifty-fourth and to the ten succeeding Congresses (March 4, 1895 – March 3, 1917). He served as chairman of the Committee on Rivers and Harbors (Sixty-second through Sixty-fourth Congresses). He did not seek renomination in 1916. He resumed the practice of law in Tampa, Florida. He served as president of the board of port commissioners until 1920.

He died in Washington, D.C., on September 26, 1929, and was interred in Woodlawn Cemetery, Tampa, Florida.

U.S. House of Representatives
| Preceded by Stephen Mallory II | Member of the U.S. House of Representatives from Florida's 1st congressional district 1895 – 1917 | Succeeded by Herbert J. Drane |
