= William James Bryan =

American politician (1876–1908)

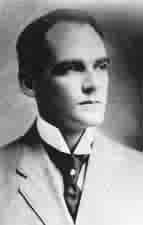

United States Senator from Florida
- In office December 26, 1907 – March 22, 1908
- Appointed by: Napoleon B. Broward
- Preceded by: Stephen Mallory II
- Succeeded by: William H. Milton

Personal details
- Born: October 10, 1876 Fort Mason, Florida, U.S.
- Died: March 22, 1908 (aged 31) Washington, D.C., U.S.
- Party: Democratic

William James Bryan (October 10, 1876 – March 22, 1908) was an American politician, attorney, and prosecutor who was a Democratic U.S. senator from the American state of Florida. Bryan's stint in the Senate was brief, having been appointed to fill a vacancy the day after Christmas of 1907 — less than three months before his own death at the age of 31.

== Biography ==
=== Early years ===
William James Bryan was born in Fort Mason, Orange County, Florida (now Lake County, Florida), on October 10, 1876. He was the son of a planter named John Milton Bryan and his wife, the former Louise Margaret Norton. Bryan counted one of his great, great grandfathers as an early pioneer from England to the Province of North Carolina. His grandfather had first moved from North Carolina to Florida and his father had become prominent in the politics of the state.

Bryan attended public schools, graduating from Osceola High School of Kissimmee, Florida. He studied extensively at home and gained admission to Emory College in Oxford, Georgia (forerunner of today's Emory University) at the age of 16. Bryan graduated from Emory with a B.A. degree in 1896.

Following graduation, Bryan taught school for one year and worked on a plantation for another, all the while studying for law school. Bryan then enrolled in the law department of Washington and Lee University in Lexington, Virginia, from which he graduated in 1899.

Bryan was admitted to the bar later in 1899 and began the practice of law in Jacksonville, Florida. Bryan initially opened a partnership but separated from his partner to open his own private office the following year.

In 1903, Bryan married Janet G. Allan, the daughter of a staff officer to Stonewall Jackson during the American Civil War who had gone on to become a mathematics professor at Washington and Lee University. The couple had two children.

=== Political career ===
In 1902, Bryan was elected as Duval County solicitor in its Criminal Court of Record. He was re-elected to this office in 1906, remaining in that capacity throughout 1907. Bryan assumed office in May 1903 and took action to ensure the enforcement of the Florida legislature's prohibition against Sunday operation of saloons and oversaw a crackdown against gambling in Jacksonville.

Bryan achieved prominence in the Florida Democratic Party during this interval, serving on the party's State Committee and elected as a delegate to the 1904 Democratic National Convention in St. Louis, Missouri.

On December 26, 1907, Bryan was appointed to the United States Senate to fill the vacancy caused by the death of Stephen Mallory II. Bryan traveled to Washington, DC to take the seat on January 8, 1908.

=== Death and legacy ===
About a month after his arrival in the nation's capital, Bryan was stricken with typhoid fever, an illness which caused his premature death on March 22, 1908, at the age of 31. Bryan was buried at Evergreen Cemetery in Jacksonville, Florida.

Bryan's older brother, Nathan Philemon Bryan (1872–1935), was elected to the United States Senate in 1910 and served a full term in Washington before becoming a Federal Circuit Court judge.

== See also ==
- List of members of the United States Congress who died in office (1900–1949)

== Footnotes ==
U.S. Senate
Preceded by Stephen R. Mallory	U.S. senator (Class 3) from Florida; 1907–1908; Served alongside: James P. Taliaferro	Succeeded by William H. Milton
Honorary titles
Preceded by Thomas Gore	Baby of the United States Senate; 1907–1908	Succeeded by Thomas Gore
