= Nathan P. Bryan =

American judge (1872–1935)

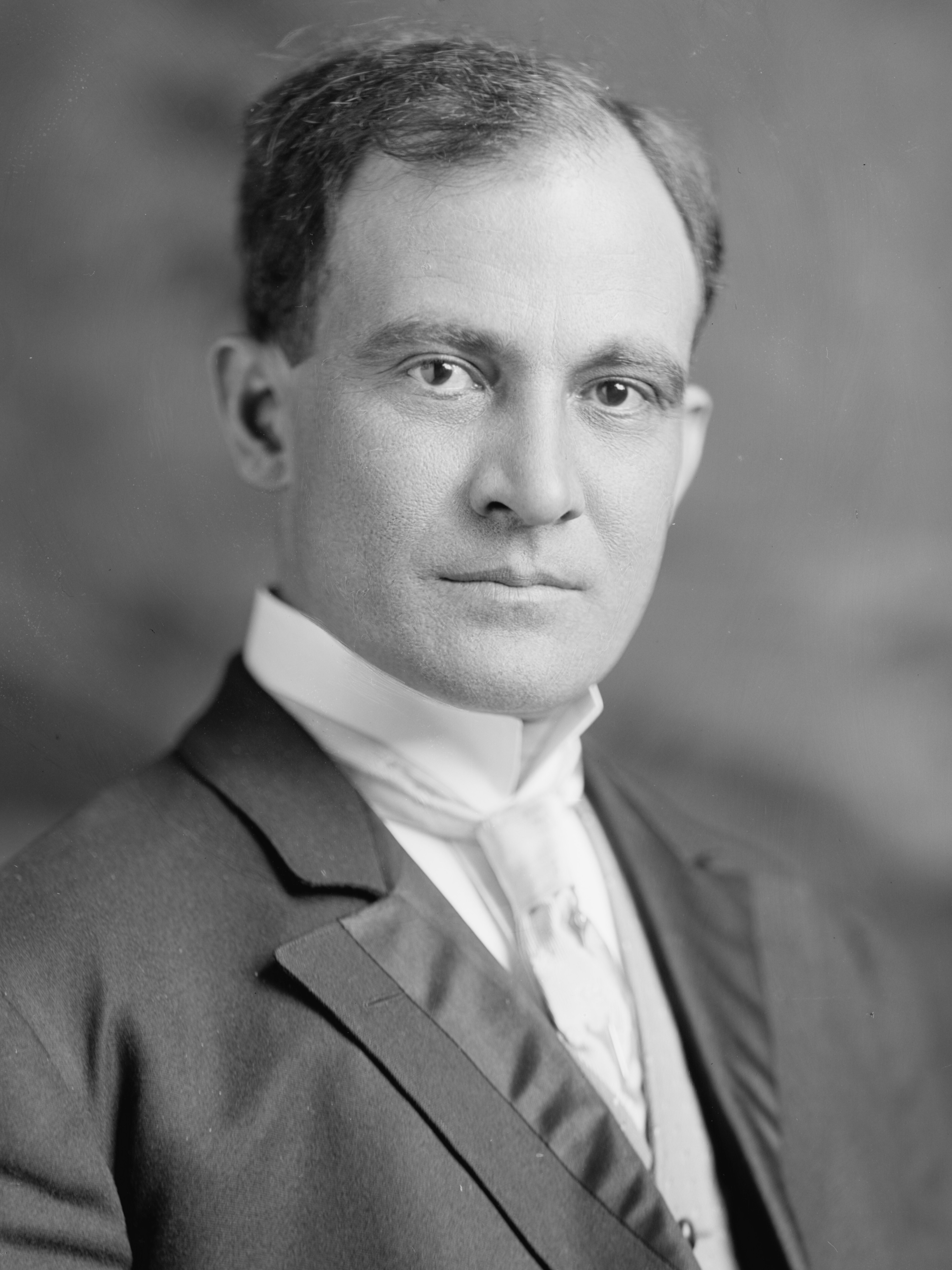

Judge of the United States Court of Appeals for the Fifth Circuit
- In office April 23, 1920 – August 8, 1935
- Appointed by: Woodrow Wilson
- Preceded by: R. L. Batts
- Succeeded by: Edwin R. Holmes

United States Senator from Florida
- In office March 4, 1911 – March 3, 1917
- Preceded by: James Taliaferro
- Succeeded by: Park Trammell

Personal details
- Born: Nathan Philemon Bryan; April 23, 1872 Fort Mason, Florida, U.S.
- Died: August 8, 1935 (aged 63) Jacksonville, Florida, U.S.
- Resting place: Evergreen Cemetery
- Party: Democratic
- Relatives: William James Bryan
- Education: Emory University (AB); Washington and Lee University (LLB)

Nathan Philemon Bryan (April 23, 1872 – August 8, 1935) was a United States senator from Florida and a United States circuit judge of the United States Court of Appeals for the Fifth Circuit.

== Education and career ==
Born on April 23, 1872, in Fort Mason, Orange County (now Lake County), Florida, Bryan attended the common schools. He received an Artium Baccalaureus degree in 1893 from Emory College and a Bachelor of Laws in 1895 from Washington and Lee University School of Law. He was admitted to the bar and entered private practice in Jacksonville, Florida from 1893 to 1911. He was chairman of the Board of Control of the Florida State institutions of higher education from 1905 to 1909.

== Congressional service ==
Bryan was appointed by the Governor of Florida on February 22, 1911, the Florida State Legislature having failed to elect, and subsequently elected as a Democrat to the United States Senate and served from March 4, 1911, to March 3, 1917. He was an unsuccessful candidate for renomination in 1916. He was Chairman of the Committee on Claims for the 63rd and 64th United States Congresses. He returned to private practice in Jacksonville from 1917 to 1920. He declined appointment as Governor General of the Philippine Islands by President Wilson in 1917. He was a trustee of Emory University.

== Federal judicial service ==
Bryan was nominated by President Woodrow Wilson on April 23, 1920, to a seat on the United States Court of Appeals for the Fifth Circuit vacated by Judge R. L. Batts. He was confirmed by the United States Senate on April 23, 1920, and received his commission the same day. He was a member of the Conference of Senior Circuit Judges (now the Judicial Conference of the United States) from 1930 to 1934. His service terminated on August 8, 1935, due to his death in Jacksonville. He was interred in Evergreen Cemetery in Jacksonville.

== Family ==
Bryan's brother was William James Bryan, also a United States senator from Florida.

== Sources ==
- United States Congress. "Nathan P. Bryan (id: B000992)". Biographical Directory of the United States Congress.
- Nathan Philemon Bryan at the Biographical Directory of Federal Judges, a publication of the Federal Judicial Center.

U.S. Senate
Preceded by James Taliaferro	United States Senator (Class 1) from Florida; 1911–1917	Succeeded by Park Trammell
Legal offices
Preceded by R. L. Batts	Judge of the United States Court of Appeals for the Fifth Circuit; 1920–1935	Succeeded by Edwin R. Holmes
