= William Hall Milton =

American politician (1864–1942)

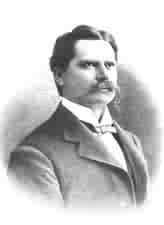

United States Senator from Florida
- In office March 27, 1908 – March 3, 1909
- Appointed by: Napoleon B. Broward
- Preceded by: William J. Bryan
- Succeeded by: Duncan U. Fletcher

Personal details
- Born: March 2, 1864 Marianna, Florida, C.S.
- Died: January 4, 1942 (aged 77) Marianna, Florida, U.S.
- Party: Democratic

William Hall Milton (March 2, 1864 – January 4, 1942) was a U.S. Senator from Florida who served as a Democrat.

== Early life, education, and career ==
Born near Marianna, Jackson County, Florida; attended the public schools of Jackson County, Marianna Academy, and the Agricultural and Mechanical College, Auburn, Alabama; city clerk and treasurer of Marianna 1885-1893; member of the Florida House of Representatives 1889-1891; studied law and was admitted to the bar in 1890; court commissioner 1890-1894; engaged in banking at Marianna 1890-1918; presidential elector on the Democratic ticket in 1892; United States surveyor general of Florida 1894-1897; president of the board of managers of the State reform school at Marianna 1897-1902; mayor of Marianna 1898-1899; unsuccessful candidate for Governor of Florida in 1900 and 1912; appointed as a Democrat to the United States Senate March 27, 1908, to fill the vacancy caused by the death of William James Bryan and served from March 27, 1908, to March 3, 1909; was not a candidate for reelection in 1908; resumed the practice of law and also engaged in the real estate and insurance business at Marianna, Fla.; member of the city council 1916-1917; appointed United States commissioner for the northern district of Florida in 1923; reappointed in 1927 and served until his death; district member of the State board of social welfare 1937-1942; died in Marianna, Fla.; interment in St. Luke’s Episcopal Cemetery.

William was the grandson of a former governor of Florida, John Milton.

U.S. Senate
Preceded by William James Bryan	U.S. senator (Class 3) from Florida; 1908–1909; Served alongside: James P. Taliaferro	Succeeded by Duncan U. Fletcher
