= Sorrento, Florida =

- Census-designated place
- Location in Lake County and the state of Florida
- Coordinates: 28°48′31″N 81°33′48″W
- Country: United States
- State: Florida
- County: Lake

Area
  - Total: 1.26 sq mi (3.27 km^{2})
  - Land: 1.26 sq mi (3.26 km^{2})
  - Water: 0.0077 sq mi (0.02 km^{2})
- Elevation: 69 ft (21 m)

Population (2020)
  - Total: 845
  - Density: 671.9/sq mi (259.44/km^{2})
- Time zone: UTC-5 (Eastern (EST))
  - Summer (DST): UTC-4 (EDT)
- ZIP code: 32776
- Area code: 352
- FIPS code: 12-66975
- GNIS feature ID: 2402865

Sorrento is an unincorporated community and census-designated place in Lake County, Florida, United States. As of the 2020 census, Sorrento had a population of 845. It is part of the Orlando–Kissimmee Metropolitan Statistical Area.

== Geography ==
Sorrento is located in eastern Lake County and is bordered to the east by Mount Plymouth. Florida State Road 46 passes through Sorrento, leading west 5 miles (8 km) to Mount Dora and east 19 miles (31 km) to Sanford.

According to the United States Census Bureau, the Sorrento CDP has a total area of 1.3 square miles (3.3 km^{2}), of which 0.02 square miles (0.05 km^{2}), or 1.52%, are water. It is part of the Wekiva River watershed.

== Demographics ==
Historical population
Census	Pop.	Note	%±
2020	845		—
U.S. Decennial Census

As of the census of 2000, there were 765 people, 269 households, and 203 families residing in the CDP. The population density was 591.2 inhabitants per square mile (228.3/km^{2}). There were 286 housing units at an average density of 221.0 per square mile (85.3/km^{2}). The racial makeup of the CDP was 89.54% White, 0.78% African American, 0.78% Native American, 6.80% from other races, and 2.09% from two or more races. Hispanic or Latino of any race were 17.39% of the population.

There were 269 households, out of which 36.8% had children under the age of 18 living with them, 57.6% were married couples living together, 11.2% had a female householder with no husband present, and 24.5% were non-families. 18.6% of all households were made up of individuals, and 6.3% had someone living alone who was 65 years of age or older. The average household size was 2.84 and the average family size was 3.23.

In the CDP, the population was spread out, with 28.6% under the age of 18, 8.9% from 18 to 24, 32.4% from 25 to 44, 20.4% from 45 to 64, and 9.7% who were 65 years of age or older. The median age was 35 years. For every 100 females, there were 104.5 males. For every 100 females age 18 and over, there were 103.0 males.

The median income for a household in the CDP was $39,318, and the median income for a family was $41,343. Males had a median income of $25,845 versus $17,101 for females. The per capita income for the CDP was $17,569. None of the families and 2.2% of the population were living below the poverty line, including no under eighteens and 15.1% of those over 64.
