= History of Troy, Alabama =

== Early history ==
Once part of territory belonging to the Creek Indian, the land that would later become Troy was settled in the early 1830s. Originally known as Deer Stand Hill (an Indian hunting ground) and first settled about 1824, it was later known as Zebulon and then Centreville before being renamed Troy (1838). Troy burned down in 1901 and had to be rebuilt from scratch.

Troy became the county seat in 1838 after being moved from Monticello. A hotel and taverns along with small mercantile stores were soon created, quickly making the new town the social center of the county.

== Civil War Era ==
At the outbreak of the American Civil War in 1861, the small village of Troy had a population of around 600. The 57th Alabama Infantry Regiment of Troy was formed in 1863. The group of soldiers were defeated at the Battle of Peachtree Creek on July 20, 1864.

Troy was spared from the ravages of the war, except that its sons were dying on battlefields throughout the South. However, on April 26, 1865, a brigade of Union cavalry under the command of General Benjamin Henry Grierson camped outside of Troy. These soldiers moved on to Louisville, Clayton and Eufaula the next day without incident.

== Reconstruction ==
After the completion of the Mobile & Girard Railroad in 1870, Troy saw a quick spike in population. One of the many to have made the journey to Troy was Jeremiah Augustus "Gus" Henderson. Having owned a large store in nearby Gainers Store (now known as Henderson), he found it difficult to transport and receive shipments by wagon. In 1869, Henry moved his mercantile store to nearby Troy to be closer to the Mobile & Girard Railroad. One of his sons, Charles Henderson, would soon be the governor of Alabama and a large contributor to Troy.

Troy would see a quick period of growth in the years to come. There was rapid growth outside of the Troy square, consisting of factories, churches, stores, and Victorian houses. Troy's population grew from 1,000 people in 1870 to over 3,000 people by 1880. It is still Troy's largest growth spurt in a decade-long time span.

== Legacy of Charles Henderson ==
Charles Henderson had many contributions to Troy, but his greatest occurred while he was mayor. He proposed that Troy acquire electric lights but that it form its own electric company to produce the new phenomenon. In his first term, he established an electric company in Troy's government May 7, 1891, and his wife, Laura Montgomery Henderson, put the lights on that evening for the first time. Down through the years, Troy has produced its own power, or bought power from the Pea River Power Company (a Charles Henderson enterprise), the Rural Electric Cooperative, Alabama Power, and is currently buying power from Constellation, an Exelon Company.

In 1906, Charles Henderson built his home on College Street adjacent to his family home. Within a 100-yard distance on this street lived, at one time or the other, two United States congressmen and brothers, Oliver C. Wiley and Ariosto A. Wiley; one chief justice of the Alabama Supreme Court, Lucien Gardner; the man who established Liberty National Life Insurance Company as one of the foremost insurance companies in the nation, Frank Park Samford; the founder of Golden Flake, Sloan Bashinsky; and the adjutant general of the Alabama National Guard under Governor Henderson, Graph Hubbard. It's hard to imagine another community street in Alabama that generated this much influence.

Even though establishing the electric business in Troy was Charles Henderson's most influential act for the city, his most famous contribution was the trust he established to foster education in Pike County and Troy. After his death in 1937, his will directed that a trust be established with the Troy Bank and Trust Company as trustee of $1 million of his wealth. After 20 years of accumulating income, the trust was to be used to foster education in Pike County and Troy by building and equipping schools "as may be needed." Then the trust was directed to build and operate a cripple children's hospital in Troy.

Since Charles Henderson was thinking of the effects of polio and did not know that this disease would be eradicated by the Salk vaccine after his death, the courts were needed to clarify his will and trust as a cripple children's hospital was no longer needed. In point of fact, there is not one in Alabama today. The net result is that the Charles Henderson Child Health Care Center in Troy was built in lieu of a hospital. There is currently $41 million in the trust to operate the clinic, and the trust continues to grow every year.

== Troy Normal School ==
In 1887, a group of local educators and prominent citizens of Troy joined to acquire a state normal school (teacher training school) for Troy. Thanks mostly to the efforts of Ariosto A. Wiley, a powerful state senator who was born in Troy, Troy won the education prize over Lowndesboro, Alabama, which had also wanted the school. The school was eventually constructed in downtown Troy on a four-acre campus.

This school, which went on to become Troy University, had a stormy early history and was lucky to have survived on its cramped downtown location. Its survival was assured when the third president of the college, Edward Madison Shackelford, led the movement from downtown to its present site starting in 1924.The school was only for white students.

== The Old Federal Road ==
To promote movement of settlers and to speed mail from Washington City to New Orleans, the Federal Road was laid out after 1805. It extended from the southern terminus of The Great Philadelphia Wagon Road at Augusta, Georgia westward through Georgia entering Alabama in what is now Russell County, and continuing westward through Macon and Montgomery counties and then southwestward through Lowndes, Butler, Monroe counties, etc. to Mobile and thence westward to New Orleans.

=== Three Notch Road ===
In 1824, a military road, the Three Notch Road, was laid out from Fort Barrancas in Pensacola, Florida and ran on top of the ridges to Fort Mitchell in Russell County, Alabama, and connected to The Federal Road. Capt. Daniel E. Burch of the U.S. Army marked the route using three notches on trees for a crew under Lt. Elias Phillips to follow The route was eventually cleared in 1824 at a cost of $1,130. It follows the ridge dividing the water sheds of the Conecuh to the northwest, and the Yellow and Pea rivers to the southeast. This road became known as The Three Notch Road and ran through Troy and Pike County. While never being highly needed as a military supply road, it became a boon to the settlers who used it to move into south-central and southeast Alabama and into northwest Florida.

== Historic John Wilkes Booth Monument ==
Troy is home of what remains of what is believed to be the only monument erected to the memory of John Wilkes Booth, the man who assassinated President Abraham Lincoln at the end of the Civil War.

The monument was not erected by the town, nor through funds raised by Troy citizens. It was instead created in 1906 by a single individual named Joseph Pinkney Parker. After returning home from the war, he discovered that his family was treated harshly by Union sympathizers and soldiers while he was gone. While not uncommon, Parker refused to let go of what had happened. He would soon erect a monument with the inscription ""Erected by Pink Parker in honor of John Wilks Booth for killing old Abe Lincoln."

Parker's hope was to place it in front of the Pike County Courthouse in Troy, but local officials were not in favor of the idea. Instead, he exercised his First Amendment rights by placing it in his front yard. When word of the monument reached the north, large public protests pressured the Troy city council to forcibly remove it. Its existence became major news around the nation by 1920. By 1921, letters from across the nation were coming in demanding that the monument be taken down immediately.

It stood on his lawn facing Madison Street in Troy for many years until Parker's death in 1921 amidst all of the controversy. The monument was re-carved and used as a tombstone for Parker in Oakwood Cemetery.
