= Fox Henderson =

American businessman

Fox Henderson Sr. (1853–1918) was a businessman and banking entrepreneur from Troy, Alabama.

== Early life ==
Fox Henderson was born in Henderson, Alabama in 1853, the oldest son of Jeremiah Augustus "Gus" Henderson and Mildred Elizabeth Henderson (née Hill). The Henderson family moved to Troy, Alabama in 1869, where Jeremiah Henderson started a successful farm mercantile business, joined by his sons Fox and Jere Clemens ("Clem").

== Business endeavors ==
In 1881, at the young age of 28, Henderson and his brother Jere purchased the Pike County Bank, and changed the name to the Farmers and Merchants (F&M) Bank. For the next 18 years, as the only bank in the area, the bank's assets grew immensely. In 1903, the bank received a national charter and the name was changed again to Farmers and Merchants National Bank. Henderson was president of the bank from its inception until his death.

In 1880, Henderson became a partner in Minchenor, Henderson & Company, a business that made handles, spokes, and picker sticks. He also co-founded the Troy Fertilizer Company in 1883 with a couple of partners – Alexander St. Claire Tennille and Oliver C. Wiley. This venture became so successful that Fox bought out his partners in 1902 and merged the fertilizer company with his other venture, the Standard Chemical Company. The newly created Standard Chemical and Oil Company, Inc. was the largest plant of its kind in southern Alabama. In 1887, the new Alabama Midland Railroad came to Troy – Henderson and his partners formed the Alabama Terminal Improvement Company, a business to build and equip the new railroad. In 1890, Henderson and his brother Charles opened the Henderson Knitting Mills, a textile manufacturing enterprise, which was shut down soon after it opened. Henderson was also a cotton merchant and organizer of the unsuccessful Troy Shoe Manufactory.

== Turn of the century ==
By 1900, Fox Henderson was one of the largest land owners in and around Troy. He established the Arcadia Dairy on his 6,000 acres (24 km^{2}) of land, which imported Jersey cows to supply the city of Troy with fresh milk.

In 1911, Henderson formed a holding company (Fox Henderson & Sons) with his sons as partners.

== Offices ==
In 1911, Fox Henderson Sr. held the following offices:

- President, First National Bank of Dozier
- President, Bank of Luverne
- President, Farmers and Merchants National Bank of Troy
- President, Henderson National Bank of Huntsville
- President, First National Bank of Brantley
- President, Standard Chemical Company of Troy
- Vice-president, First National Bank of Andalusia
- Vice-president, First National Bank of Brundidge
- Vice-president, Henderson Lumber Company of Sanford
- Vice-president, Planters Trading Company of Elba
- Partner, Henderson-Hill of Brantley
- Partner, Cody-Henderson of Luverne
- Partner, Henderson-Black Company of Troy

Henderson was posthumously inducted into the Alabama Business Hall of Fame.

== Family life ==
As a young man, Henderson married Sallie Wilkerson. The couple had three sons – Fox Henderson Jr., Fred and Jake, and one daughter, Gussie Henderson Jones.

He donated land for the Pike County Fair and the Pike Masonic Hospital, the first hospital in Troy, now named Beard Memorial Hospital. He also built the courthouse in Troy with his business partner Joe Minchener. Though he never apparently expressed any interest in running for political office, he was the chief contributor to his brother Charles Henderson’s successful campaign for governor of Alabama in 1914.

Henderson died in 1918 at the age of 65. He is buried in Oakwood Cemetery in Troy next to his wife, Sallie.
