= Weschler =

Weschler is a surname. Notable people with the surname include:

- Anita Weschler (1903–2000), American sculptor and writer
- Lawrence Weschler (born 2/13/1952), American author of works of creative nonfiction
- Toni Weschler (born 11/29/1955), author of the bestselling book on women's health and fertility, teacher of the system Fertility Awareness Method

== See also ==
- Wechsler (disambiguation)
- Wexler (disambiguation)
