= Party school =

Educational institution known for its partying culture

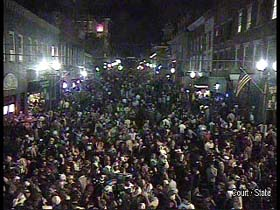
Large block parties in college towns may be associated with party schools.

Party school is a term primarily used in the United States to refer to a college or university that has a reputation for alcohol and drug use or a general culture of partying usually at the expense of educational achievement. The Princeton Review published a list of schools that its surveys identified as party schools. Playboy magazine has also released lists of party schools on an irregular basis.

Many schools disapprove of the party school label, and the lists have been condemned by groups such as the American Medical Association for promoting dangerous behavior.

== Party school lists ==
The Princeton Review was well known for publishing a list of party schools from 1993 until 2022. Ranking was determined by student responses to a survey of alcohol and drug use on campus, the amount of time students spend studying outside of class, and the proportion of students involved in Greek Life.

Playboy published a list of party schools in 1987, 2002, 2006, and in a number of years more regularly since 2009. The 1987 list included forty schools, with sixteen honorable mentions; California State University, Chico ranked first, a distinction that, according to the magazine, some students considered a burden. In 2002, the list featured twenty-five schools and ten honorable mentions and was topped by Arizona State University. The University of Wisconsin–Madison placed first among ten schools in 2006, and in 2009, the University of Miami gained the top spot out of 25, ranking highest in the "brains" category, as well as in the "bikini" category.

It is widely believed that Playboy released additional lists of party schools in the past, but this claim has been debunked by Snopes.com. Playboy did describe the University of Wisconsin as "the party school" in a September 1968 issue, and deemed the University of California, Los Angeles "tops in campus action" in 1976. However, the magazine did not actually rank schools until January 1987. In 2009, Playboy announced it would make the list an annual feature in the magazine.

McGill University, in Montreal and the University of Western Ontario, in London, Ontario, are the only Canadian schools to have made the list.

== Criticism of party school lists ==
In 2003, the American Medical Association requested that the Princeton Review remove the party school rankings from its college guides. Dr. Richard Yost, director of the AMA's Office of Alcohol and Other Drug Abuse, said, "The Princeton Review should be ashamed to publish something for students and parents that fuels the false notion that alcohol is central to the college experience and that ignores the dangerous consequences of high-risk drinking. College binge drinking is a major public health issue and a source of numerous problems for institutions of higher learning." The accuracy of The Princeton Review's rankings has also been questioned, especially with regards to the larger schools. Experts argue that the sample size of students surveyed at each college (three hundred students, on average) is not enough to provide a truthful depiction of student behavior. "It's positively unscientific," said Dr. Henry Wechsler of the Harvard School of Public Health College Alcohol Studies Program.

Administrators, professors, and many students at party schools have tried to disassociate themselves from the rankings. For example, West Virginia University president Michael Garrison refused to give interviews about his school's appearance in the 2007–08 Princeton Review list. "I've talked to thousands of our students over the weekend and during the first days of classes. Their concerns are with their education, with their futures, and with the great year we have ahead at WVU," he said in a prepared statement.

== See also ==
- Fracket
