= P. Colfax Rameau =

African American activist, editor and minister

P. Colfax Rameau (1874–?) was an American minister, newspaper editor, newspaper publisher, civil rights leader, and leader of Black workers in Alabama. He served as president of the Southern Afro–American Federation of Industrial Brotherhood. He published the Workmen's Chronicle. He advocated for opportunities for black miners and he opposed black membership in white-led unions. He also used the name Colfax Rameau, and P.C. Rameau.

== Biography ==
Born in Mobile, Alabama in 1874, he attended school there and graduated from Talladega College in Talladega, Alabama. He took a course in the philosophy department at the University of Pennsylvania, and later traveled for two years in Europe and Asia working as a baker. After his return to the United States he advocated for a reformatory school to be established to put "delinquents" to work. He edited the Workmen's Chronicle, which is described by Brian Kelly as "black-run, ardently antiunion.

In 1918 he wrote to Alabama governor Charles Henderson about organizing war councils among black miners. He wrote to Woodrow Wilson in 1920 and James J. Davis in 1921.
