= S. Hubert Dent Jr. =

American lawyer and politician (1869–1938)

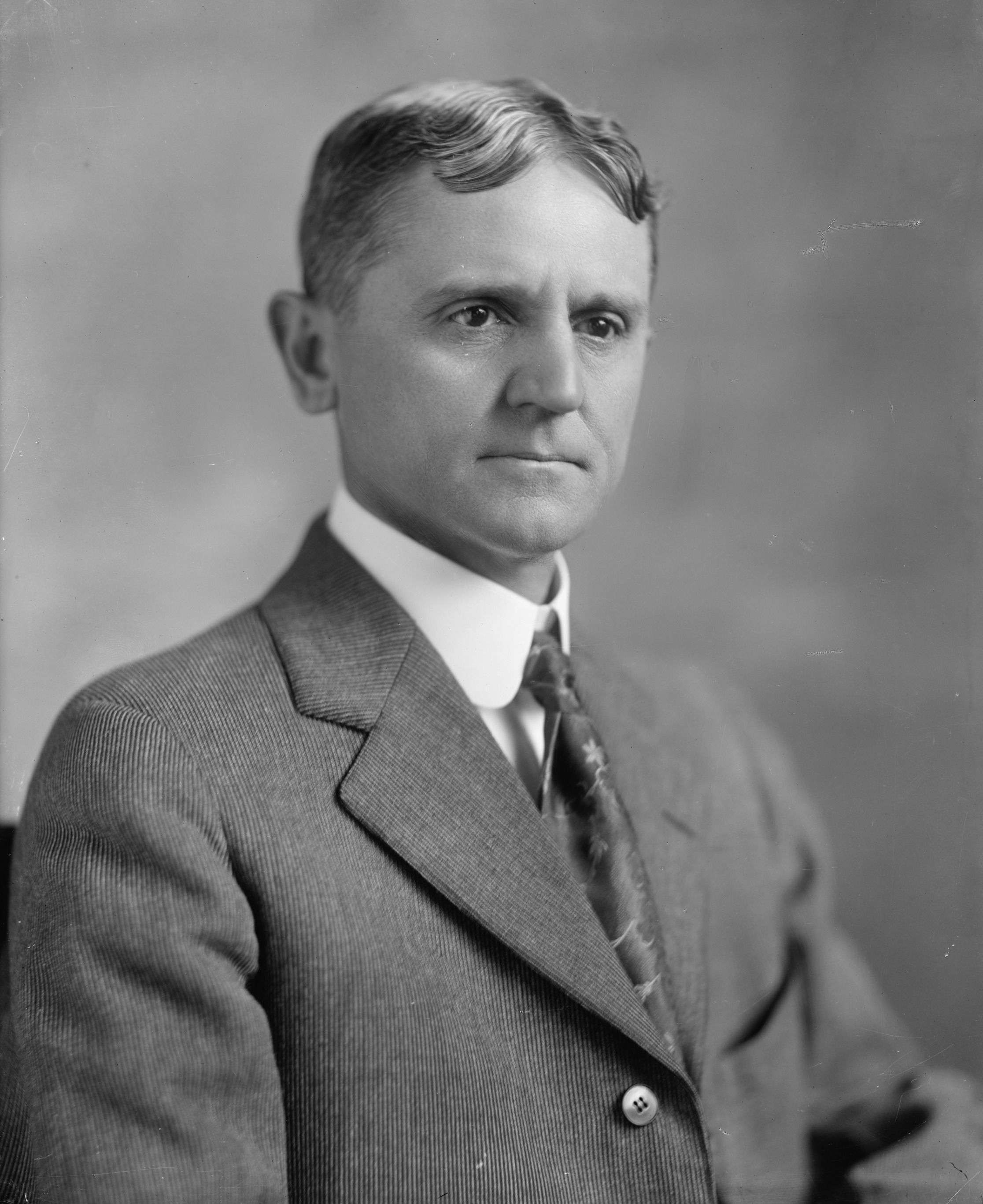

Member of the U.S. House of Representatives from Alabama's 2nd district
- In office March 4, 1909 – March 3, 1921
- Preceded by: Oliver C. Wiley
- Succeeded by: John R. Tyson

Personal details
- Born: Stanley Hubert Dent Jr. August 16, 1869 Eufaula, Alabama, U.S.
- Died: October 6, 1938 (aged 69) Montgomery, Alabama, U.S.
- Resting place: Eufaula Cemetery, Eufaula, Alabama
- Party: Democratic
- Education: Southern University; University of Virginia School of Law

Stanley Hubert Dent Jr. (August 16, 1869 – October 6, 1938) was an American lawyer and politician who served six terms as a U.S. representative from Alabama from 1909 to 1921.

== Early life and education ==
Born in Eufaula, Alabama, Dent attended the common schools, and was graduated from Southern University (later known as Birmingham Southern College), Greensboro, Alabama, in 1886. He was graduated from the University of Virginia Law School at Charlottesville in 1889.

== Early career ==
He was admitted to the bar the same year and practiced in Eufaula, Alabama, until 1899. He moved to Montgomery, Alabama, in 1899 and continued the practice of his profession.He served as delegate to the State constitutional convention in 1901. He served as prosecuting attorney for Montgomery County in 1902–1909.

== Political career ==
He served as delegate to the Democratic National Convention in 1908.

=== U.S. House of Representatives ===
Dent was elected as a Democrat to the Sixty-first and to the five succeeding Congresses (March 4, 1909 – March 3, 1921).

He served as chairman of the Committee on Military Affairs (Sixty-fifth Congress).

==== Position on World War I ====
Dent was one of the "Alabama Interventionists" who argued in favor of American entry into World War I along with George Huddleston, Fred L. Blackmon, William B. Bankhead, James Thomas Heflin, William Bacon Oliver, Oscar Lee Gray and Henry B. Steagall. These eight congressmen advocated joining the war in Europe on the Allied side. John L. Burnett said "Those fellows believe, more than anything, that our place on the world stage is with England. I can't say that I agree." Similarly Edward B. Almon said "They are an octet of England's men, genuine in their beliefs, sincere in their beliefs, but they are incautious and devoted too dearly to old England. They and I part ways on the matter of this war." Dent's 1916 election campaign was run almost entirely on the issue of the war. Dent referenced the Wire of Death, the Burning of Louvain, the murder of Edith Cavell, the massacres at Dinant and German raids on English coastal towns in his speeches. He spoke of "wholesome England" and "brutal Germany."

His only opponent was E.H. Titus of the Socialist Party of America. E.H. Titus condemned England as "imperialist" and said Germany was the victim of "warmongers." Similarly, Titus advocated isolationism and said the United States should not be involved in the war, while Dent advocated joining the war "on England's side." Emmet O'Neal and Charles Henderson both made public statements which were sympathetic to the United Kingdom and Belgium and which condemned Germany, and Titus said "O'Neil, Henderson and Dent" wanted Americans to "fight England's war, but there's another side to the story." When asked about Titus's "other side to the story" quote, Dent said "the other side to right is wrong." Edward J. Green of the Socialist Party of America called Dent "an imperialist."

== Later career ==
He was an unsuccessful candidate for renomination in 1920, losing the Democratic primary to John R. Tyson who went on to win the general.

He resumed the practice of law in Montgomery, Alabama. He served as president of the State constitutional convention for repeal of the Eighteenth Amendment in 1933.

== Death ==
He died in Montgomery, Alabama, on October 6, 1938.

He was interred in Eufaula Cemetery, Eufaula, Alabama.

== See also ==
- Dent Act of 1919

U.S. House of Representatives
| Preceded by Oliver C. Wiley | Member of the U.S. House of Representatives from Alabama's 2nd congressional district 1909–1921 | Succeeded by John R. Tyson |
