= Alcohol use among college students =

Unhealthy alcohol drinking behaviors by college students

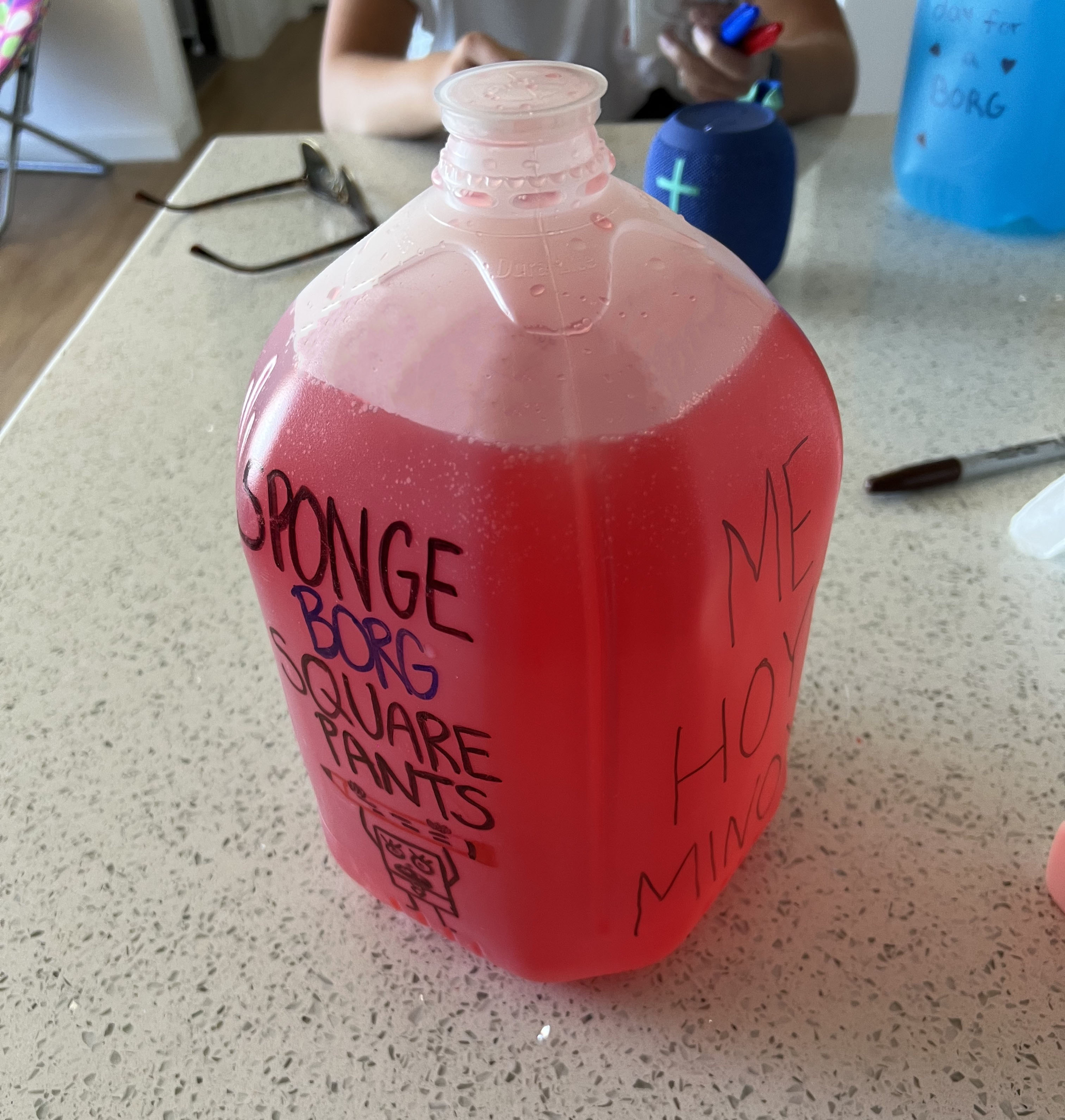
Experts and governments have warned and discouraged a few alcoholic beverages including caffeinated alcoholic drinks, alcopop, and borg (pictured), that often makes young people binge drink.

Many students attending colleges, universities, and other higher education institutions consume alcoholic beverages. The laws and social culture around this practice vary by country and institution type, and within an institution, some students may drink heavily whereas others may not drink at all. In the United States, drinking tends to be particularly associated with fraternities.

Alcohol abuse among college students refers to unhealthy alcohol drinking behaviors by college and university students. While the legal drinking age varies by country, the high number of underage students that consume alcohol has presented many problems and consequences for universities. The causes of alcohol abuse tend to be peer pressure, fraternity or sorority involvement, and stress. College students who abuse alcohol can suffer from health concerns, poor academic performance or legal consequences. Prevention and treatment include campus counseling, stronger enforcement of underage drinking or changing the campus culture.

== Background ==
The National Institute on Alcohol Abuse and Alcoholism reported in 2012, that more than 80% of college students drink alcohol, with estimated 40% report binge drinking in the past two weeks, and about 25% report having academic consequences because of their drinking. 56% of students reported binge drinking once a week. In comparison, the comparable figure of alcoholism for American Indian and Alaskan Native youth is approximately 80 percent.

Individual and environmental factors for experiencing alcohol-related consequences have been identified such as drinking during high-risk periods, such as spring break, or belonging to specific student subgroups (e.g., Greek organizations). Drinking throughout high school also played a role, suggesting that binge drinking starts earlier than college for some.

Statistics

Drinking alcohol is a very common thing for both underage and of age. Though, there are some different statistics for men vs women and underage vs above age. From Wechsler in 2002, we get some numbers about different alcohol consumption statistics. "Although underage college students are less likely to be drinkers then their college peers aged over 21 years of age (77% vs. 86% past-year consumption of any alcohol, odds ratio [OR]=56%), they were more likely to report that they typically engaged in binge drinking on occasions when they did consume alcohol (58% men and 32% women vs 42% men and 21% women; men OR = 1.93, women OR = 1.85), where binge drinking was defined as five or more drinks in a sitting for men and for our more drinks in a sitting for women" (Martinez J.A. et al. 2007). Though it is highly illegal to consume alcohol under the age of 21, it is highly popular to consume and use a fake ID to purchase it.

== Binge drinking ==
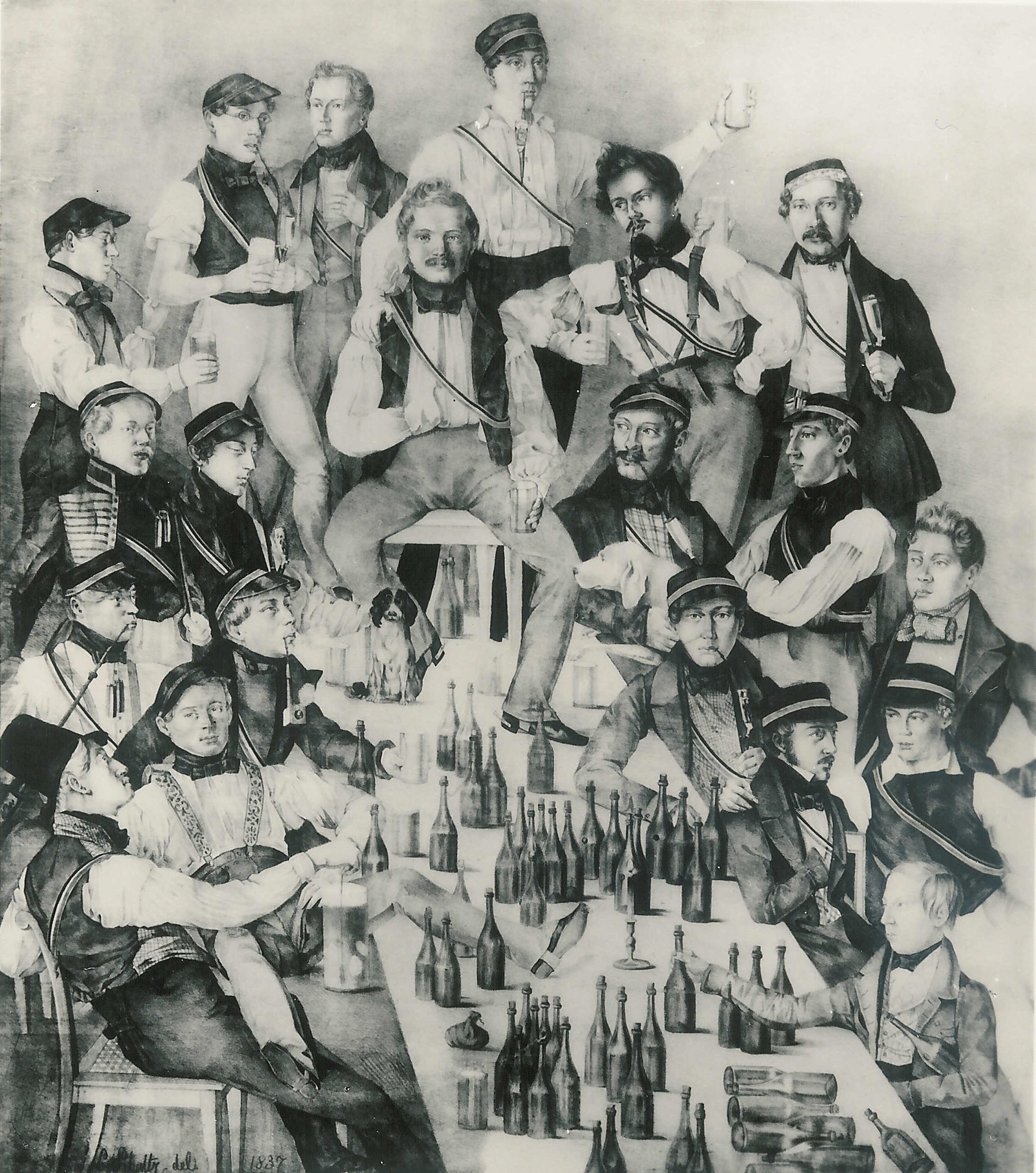
Members of a German student corps drinking, Duchy of Brunswick, 1837

Binge drinking occurs when students drink large amounts of alcohol in a relatively short space of time in order to feel the full effects of alcohol consumption. The National Institute on Alcohol Abuse and Alcoholism (NIAAA) defines binge drinking as a pattern of drinking that brings a person's blood alcohol concentration (BAC) to 0.08 percent or above. BAC is the measure of alcohol in one's bloodstream; a BAC of 0.08, therefore, means that 0.08% of the bloodstream consists of alcohol. This is usually seen when men consume five or more drinks, and when women consume four or more drinks in a two-hour time period. Factors that can affect a person's BAC include body weight, biological sex, medications, the number of drinks consumed, and the time during which they have been consumed.

Most people younger than age 21 who drink alcohol report binge drinking. The rates of college students binge drinking in the United States have fluctuated for the past years. In college, over 50% of students take part in binge drinking, while 80% of college students report having consumed alcohol during college. Over half of universities' student bodies consist of those under the legal drinking age of 21. Underage drinking is when people below the legal drinking age consume alcohol. This fluctuates for every country: 21 in the United States, 18 in the United Kingdom.

Young adults who participate in binge drinking experience higher rates of physical and sexual assault, and unwanted, unplanned, and unprotected sexual activity. There are also links between heavy alcohol consumption and depression.

The motivations among young students have changed as well. In recent years, more students are drinking with the intended purpose of getting drunk.

== Causes ==
=== Greek life ===
Participation in Greek life at a college or university may be associated with increased alcohol use. A survey taken of one national fraternity with 98 chapters across 32 states showed that 97% of their members were drinkers and 64% of them took part in binge drinking. This is higher than the overall college average of 80% drinkers and 50% binge drinkers. Another study showed that members who were part of a fraternity reported two or more symptoms of alcohol use disorder (AUD) at a rate of 45 for every 100 participants. This number was greater than other participants with the average around 31 per 100 participants. The same change was also seen in women who were part of a sorority, with 26.4% of them reporting symptoms of AUD while close to 18% of other women felt the same effects.

=== Low-cost alcohol ===
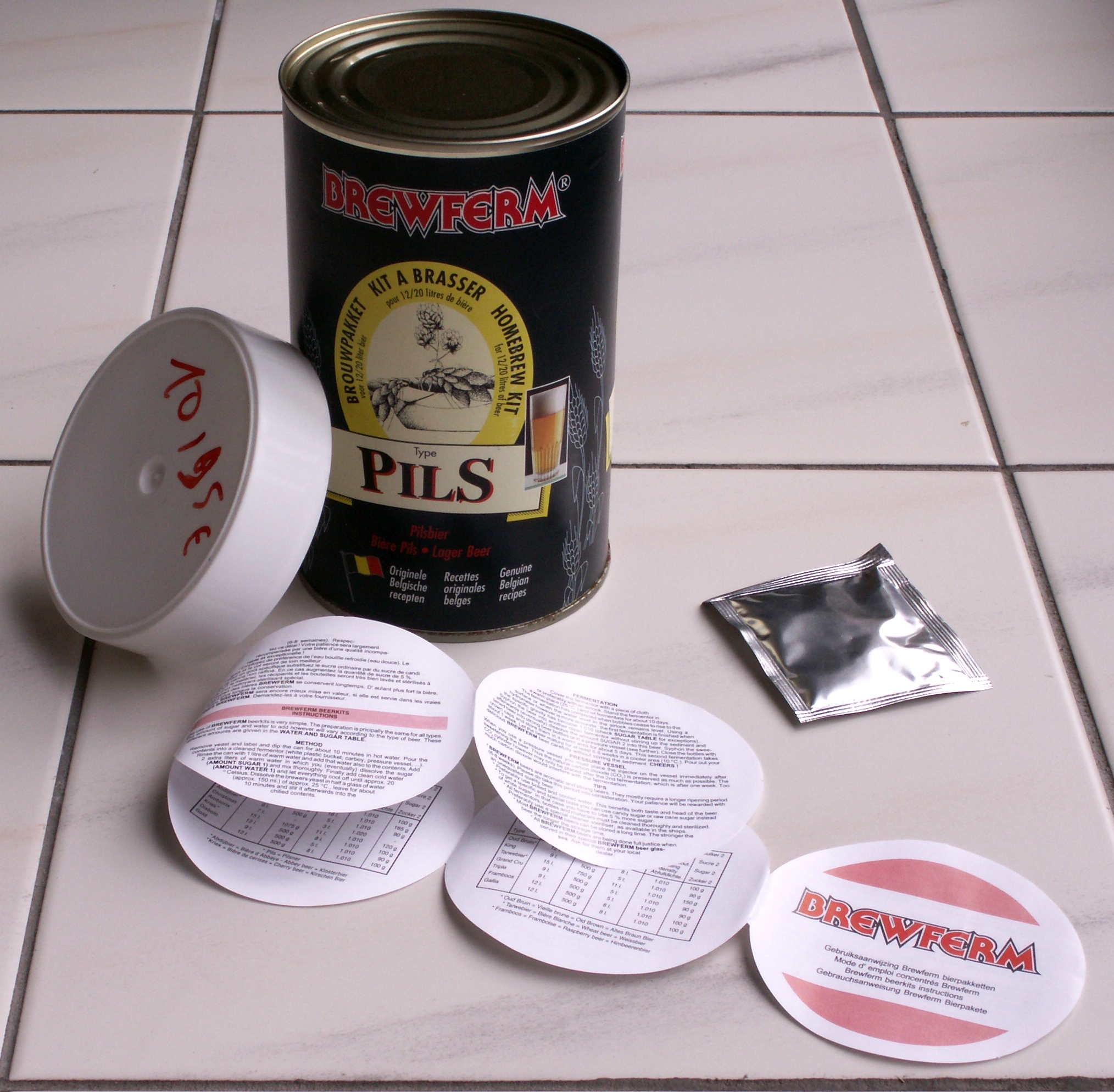
A homebrewing kit consisting of hopped malt extract, yeast and instructions

Research indicates that the abundance of alcohol retailers and the availability of inexpensive alcoholic beverages are linked to heavy alcohol consumption among college students.

=== Peer pressure ===
In 2001, there were 1,717 unintentional deaths from the consumption of alcohol or other substances, which raised concerns about the excessive use of alcohol. There are many causes of excessive drinking on college campuses. Many students report they felt peer pressured to consume large amounts of alcohol. Peer pressure may occur in multiple forms. One of the more indirect forms of peer pressure is social modelling. In this method, the more "popular" people from a group could be consuming alcohol, and pressure others to drink in excess to fit in and be part of the larger group.

=== Stress ===
Stressors for college students can include academic stress, family, and relationship stress. Penn State released a study that showed that the more daily stressors students have in their lives, the more likely students are to engage in alcohol. In the same study it was there was also a direct correlation with drinking to cope with stress and AUDs. There was a higher percentage of students who drank to cope with stress who developed AUDs through their professional career.

=== Societal influences ===
The rise of social media platforms such as Instagram, Facebook, and streaming platforms like Netflix show advertisements for alcoholic beverages. These parties carry a stigma as everyone in the pictures and movies is seen to be having a great time. This encourages students, both in college and high school, to be more tempted to try alcohol or other substances as they too would like to be part of these events and not excluded from such "great" events. The National Longitudinal Survey conducted an analysis in 1997 which showed that a 28% reduction in alcohol advertising theoretically will reduce adolescent alcohol participation by 2–3% and participation in binge drinking from 12% to between 11%–8%. Another source of social media related influence originates in alcohol-related posts on social media platforms made by important peers and social network members. There is a positive correlation between having a social network circle that presents more alcohol-related social media postings and the number of drinks that are consumed per week. This correlation also extends to a higher frequency of alcohol use and having more alcohol related consequences, especially among college students who use social media more than any other age group.

Fake IDs

Fake IDs can allow underage students to purchase and consume alcohol. In a 2011 analysis of data from a web-based alcohol education program, 7.7% of incoming freshman reported owning a fake ID. Membership in or intent to join a fraternity or sorority significantly increased the odds of owning a fake ID. Additionally, students who took the survey after the start of fall classes, who reported one or more heavy drinking episodes in the past two weeks, and those who reported drinking and driving were more likely to own a fake ID.

== Effects ==
=== Alcoholism ===
As high as 40% of college students could now be considered alcoholics, as defined by the next edition psychiatry's diagnostic manual, but many of these individuals would be regarded as having only a mild drinking problem. Most college binge drinkers and drug users do not develop lifelong problems.

=== Academic performance ===
College students who engage in binge drinking tend to have lower grades than those who do not. According to a study by The Center for the Study of Collegiate Mental Health at Pennsylvania State, students who abuse alcohol showed a clear correlation with a lower GPA. As the frequency of binge drinking increases, the GPA decreases. Another study showed increased alcohol abuse directly links to poor motivation for school and poor academic performance. The Alcohol Rehab Guide expresses the consequences of binge drinking and alcoholism and how it can negatively impact students academic performance, "Excessive alcohol consumption can take a toll on a students academics. Drinking may even become a priority over attending classes, completing homework and studying for exams. An estimated one in every four college students admit to having poor grades or other academic problems because of their drinking behavior. A lack of effort in school can make a difference in whether a student passes or fails a class. It can cost thousands of dollars to retake a course or change majors due to bad grades. In addition, failing classes will push back a student's graduation, taking more time and money to complete the degree program." (Galbicsek C. 2023).

=== Health concerns ===
The consequences of binge drinking include alcohol poisoning, nausea and vomiting, unintentional injuries, increased risk of unplanned pregnancies and violent behavior. Each year, 1,825 college students die from alcohol-related unintentional injuries, including motor-vehicle crashes, 696,000 college students are assaulted by another student who has been drinking, and 97,000 college students report an alcohol-related sexual assault or date rape. For students under the legal drinking age of 21 in the United States, alcohol use can result in future unhealthy behavior and impaired brain development as early college age is when the brain is developing. According to studies by McLean Hospital, early alcohol drinking can be associated with serious problems with alcohol later in life.

=== Legal consequences ===
The legal consequences stemming from underage drinking can have severe impacts on a student's life and career. Students who get caught drinking alcohol underage face various repercussions from loss of driver's license, fines, community service, or even jail time. For those of age who are supplying minors with alcohol could also face severe consequences from being charged with a criminal offense to being arrested. Individual schools might also place their own sanctions on students who drink underage that can range from being on probation to expulsion. Many schools also have strict regulations as to having alcohol or consuming alcohol regardless of age in university owned housing. Doing so may result in warnings, probation, and ultimately removal from university owned housing and expulsion from university owned housing in the future.

At certain U.S. colleges, campus police will conduct bar raids by taking a certain number of people from the bar to catch underage students drinking. At some universities, such as University of Wisconsin-Madison, students have to pay a ticket of over $250 and attend classes on the effects of alcohol. Records of underage alcohol consumption, whether through legal records or social media posts, can have consequences for students' future academic and professional plans.

Students are encouraged to prioritize safe drinking over non-drinking. Many schools have transportation services that are specific to drinking so students can avoid driving while intoxicated.

=== Student misconduct ===
Alcohol use is involved in over half the sexual assault cases on college campuses. For the most part, it is the men being intoxicated that commit acts of sexual assault. In addition, sexual assaults involving alcohol tend to occur between a man and a woman that are not familiar to each other. The very nature of being intoxicated from alcohol tends to make men feel more powerful and privileged, leading to an increase in risk that the man will sexually assault a woman. Furthermore, a professor from Washington State University found through a study that men involved in heavy alcohol consumption are more likely to display acts of sexual aggression.

=== Underage drinking ===
Underage alcohol consumption is a serious public health issue that has many risks to young people. It not only threatens or could potentially impact their immediate health but also has long-term effects that can harm their development, school performance, and social skills. Adolescents (children) often go through many changes, but some of these changes might involve alcohol problems. Parents, teachers, and caregivers should be aware of the signs that a young person may be struggling with alcohol use. Common warning signs include mood swings, dropping grades, rebellious/destructive behavior, low energy, and losing interest in things they once enjoyed. Physical signs such as smelling of alcohol, slurred speech, or trouble with coordination/hand-eye coordination are also important to notice. Identifying these warning signs early can help in getting the needed help and/or support, which may prevent more serious alcohol-related issues later on in life. Preventing underage drinking requires active involvement from parents and educators around younger people. "Research shows that children of actively involved parents are less likely to drink alcohol. However, if parents provide alcohol to their kids (even small amounts), have positive attitudes about drinking, and engage in alcohol misuse, adolescents have an increased risk of misusing alcohol" (National Institute of Alcohol Abuse and Alcoholism, 2023). Parents can play a big role in prevention by talking about the risks, knowing their children's friends, and looking over events where alcohol may be involved. Supporting healthy activities like sports or arts for example, can provide young people with safer and more positive alternatives to drinking. Underage alcohol use shows serious health risks and can lead to long lasting negative effects on young people's lives. By realizing and understanding the dangers, recognizing warning signs, and putting effective prevention ideas in place, we can protect youth from the harmful consequences of alcohol. Increased awareness and better policies are crucial in addressing this issue. By working together, parents, educators, and communities, we can create a healthier and safer environment for young people, allowing them to succeed in life without the risks associated with alcohol use.

== Prevention and treatment ==
=== Campus counseling ===
Offering campus counseling is one way to prevent students from developing long term consequences. Monitoring and prohibiting the use of fake IDs on or around campus is another way to prevent alcohol abuse amongst students. According to recent statistics, the ownership of a fake ID increased from around 12% prior to entering college to about 32% by the end of sophomore year. In addition, 51% of students say that it is incredibly easy to obtain alcohol on and off campus. Fostering a campus culture that fights against binge drinking is another useful preventative method. According to a study done in 2006, 59% of incoming freshman enter college as non-drinkers. A little more than a month into the first semester, 44% of non-drinkers begin drinking. A way to combat the abuse of alcohol, especially among first year students who are not considered to be drinkers, is to create more spaces and events that do not include alcohol. Professionals can help students who might have drinking problems. Students can share why they drink when they should be studying. Whatever the reasons, the counselor can help them reduce or eliminate drinking. Counseling can prevent students from drinking by educating them about the risks and consequences of binge drinking on college campuses. While college counseling can be beneficial, it is essential to consider its advantages and disadvantages. Studies have shown that college counseling can help students with their drinking problems, but the effects may only be temporary. According to recent research by the American Psychological Association, three out of four students may return to their previous level of drinking. Therefore, it is crucial to be aware of both the benefits and limitations of college counseling when dealing with alcohol-related issues among students. Additionally, it is equally essential for students to be mindful of the resources and support available to them through their college to address alcohol-related problems.

=== Screening for substance use ===
Proactive screening for substance use is important for early intervention and education, given the reluctance of many young adults to seek help for these issues. Integrating substance use screening into routine assessments allows clinicians to identify individuals who may benefit from support in a neutral manner.

== See also ==
- Alcohol consumption by youth in the United States
- Alcohol advertising on college campuses
- Alcohol enema
- American Indian alcoholism
- Cigarette smoking among college students
- College health
- Pregaming
