= Mongkol Na Songkhla =

Thai doctor and politician (1941–2020)

- มงคล ณ สงขลา

Minister of Public Health
- In office 9 October 2006 – 6 February 2008
- Prime Minister: Surayud Chulanont
- Preceded by: Pinit Jarusombat
- Succeeded by: Chaiya Sasomsub

Personal details
- Born: 16 January 1941 Bangkok, Thailand
- Died: 11 December 2020 (aged 79) Bangkok, Thailand
- Education: Faculty of Medicine Siriraj Hospital, Mahidol University
- Profession: Physician; politician

Mongkol Na Songkhla (Thai: มงคล ณ สงขลา, RTGS: Mongkhon na Songkhla; 16 January 1941 – 11 December 2020) was a Thai physician and public health administrator who served as Minister of Health for Thailand. He was appointed by Thai Prime Minister Surayud Chulanont and sworn into office on October 9, 2006. On February 6, 2008, he was replaced by Chaiya Sasomsab.

== Education and careers ==
Mongkol graduated with a Bachelor of Medicine degree from Faculty of Medicine Siriraj Hospital, Mahidol University and a Master's degree in Public Health from the Netherlands and also Ph.D. in the pharmaceutical manufacturing industry. After graduating, he served as a doctor under the Ministry of Public Health. He used to serve as director of Phimai Hospital at Nakhon Ratchasima Province. Later, he became the Director-General of the Department of Medical Services and Secretary-General of the Food and Drug Administration and held the highest position, as the Permanent Secretary of the Ministry of Public Health.

He won the Outstanding Rural Doctor Award in 1976.

== Family ==
Mongkol was a member of the na Songkhla family, who are of Thai Chinese heritage and maintained good relations with bureaucratic elites during the 18th and 19th centuries. The na Songkhla clan traces its origin back to Chin Yiang Sae Hao, its clan founder, who migrated from Fujian province to Siam in 1750 and established political influence in Songkhla Province.

== Minister of Public Health ==
Notable among his measures was the making the 30-baht universal healthcare program completely free; after criticism from the Budget Bureau, the government later cut the universal healthcare program budget from a subsidy of 2,089 baht per head, compared to the previously proposed figure of 1,899 baht. Those eligible for the subsidy were cut from 48 million to 46 million people.

Another notable measure taken while he was Minister of Health was the issuance of compulsory licenses for several patented drugs. The drugs to be covered under the compulsory license included the HIV/AIDS drugs efavirenz and lopinavir/ritonavir, as well as the heart disease therapeutic clopidogrel.

In addition, Mongkol proposed a broadcast ban on all alcohol advertising in Thailand. Although this proposed ban was not signed by King Bhumibol Adulyadej, Thai broadcasters and publishers have voluntarily observed it. The ban has been criticized by advertisers and beverage companies for its stifling effect on trade.

== Death ==
Mongkol died at the age of 79 at 10:00 pm on the evening of December 11, 2020 after previously being sick with cancer and continued treatment until he died.
