= Jesse F. Stallings =

American politician (1856–1928)

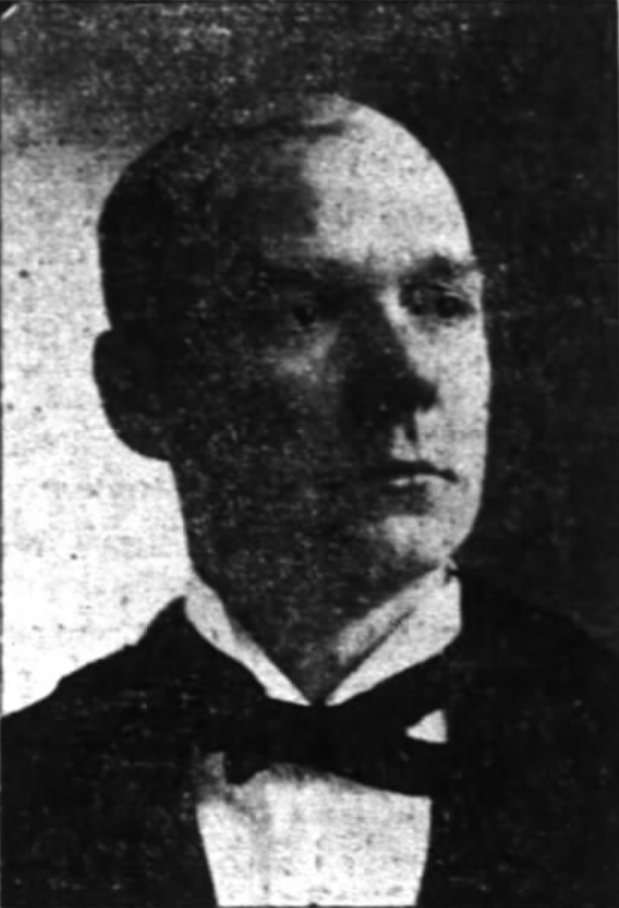
- Stallings in 1900 newspaper

Member of the U.S. House of Representatives from Alabama's 2nd district
- In office March 4, 1893 – March 3, 1901
- Preceded by: Hilary A. Herbert
- Succeeded by: Ariosto A. Wiley

Personal details
- Born: James Francis Stallings; April 4, 1856 near Manningham, Alabama, U.S.
- Died: March 18, 1928 (aged 71) Birmingham, Alabama, U.S.
- Resting place: Elmwood Cemetery; Birmingham, Alabama, U.S.
- Party: Democratic
- Spouses: Ella McAllister (m. 1883; died 1885) Belle McAllister (m. 1887) Marie Hudmon (m. 1909)
- Education: University of Alabama at Tuscaloosa

Jesse Francis Stallings (April 4, 1856 – March 18, 1928) was an American lawyer and politician who served four terms as a U.S. representative from Alabama from 1893 to 1901.

== Early life and education ==
Born near Manningham, Alabama, to Reuben Stallings and Lucinda Ferguson. Stallings completed preparatory studies and was graduated from the University of Alabama at Tuscaloosa in 1877. He studied law at that university. Through his father he was descended from Jacob Astley, 1st Baron Astley of Reading and Edward Ford.

== Career ==
He was admitted to the bar in April 1880 and commenced practice in Greenville, Alabama.

Stallings was elected by the legislature of Alabama as solicitor for the second judicial circuit in November 1886 and served until his resignation in September 1892.

He served as delegate to the Democratic National Convention in 1888.

=== Congress ===
Stallings was elected as a Democrat to the Fifty-third and to the three succeeding Congresses (March 4, 1893 – March 3, 1901). He was not a candidate for renomination in 1900.

== Later career ==
After leaving Congress, he resumed the practice of his profession in Birmingham, Alabama. Also served as president of the Lincoln Reserve Life Insurance Co. 1912 to 1928.

== Personal life ==
He married Ella McAllister in 1883, who later died in 1885. He then married Belle McAllister in 1887. In 1909, Stallings married Marie Hudmon.

== Death and burial ==
Stallings died in Birmingham. He was interred in Elmwood Cemetery.

U.S. House of Representatives
Preceded by Hilary A. Herbert	Member of the U.S. House of Representatives from Alabama's 2nd congressional district March 4, 1893 – March 3, 1901	Succeeded by Ariosto A. Wiley
