= Wechsler =

Wechsler (German: exchanger) may refer to:

== Surname ==
- David Wechsler (1896–1981), Romanian-American psychologist
- Henry Wechsler (1931/32–2021), Polish-American researcher
- Herbert Wechsler (1909–2000), American legal scholar
- James Wechsler (1915–1983), American journalist
- Judith Wechsler (born 1940), American art historian and filmmaker
- Lazar Wechsler (1896–1981), Swiss film producer
- Nick Wechsler (actor) (born 1978), American actor
- Nick Wechsler (film producer), American film producer
- Benjamin Fondane (born Benjamin Wechsler or Wexler; 1898–1944), Romanian and French writer

== Other ==
- Wechsler School, a historic school in Meridian, Mississippi

== See also ==
- Wexler (disambiguation)
