= Group Against Liquor Advertising =

The Group Against Liquor Advertising (GALA) was a non-profit group in New Zealand who believed that advertising alcohol leads to increased consumption (as compared to changing brand loyalties). It was not a prohibitionist group.

The group was established in the 1990s in response to a government decision in 1992 to permit alcohol brand advertising under a self-regulatory body. The group disbanded in 2012. Many members then moved their support to the Alcohol Action organisation.

The chair of GALA for many years starting 1992 was Viola Palmer, a general practitioner. The Complaints Secretary for a time was Cliff Turner.

The group made many complaints to the Broadcasting Standards Authority and the Advertising Standards Complaints Board, and while many failed, some were successful. One success was the withdrawal of a television advertisement for Lion beer in 1997 after it complained to the Advertising Standards Complaint Board. In 1999 a successful complaint against Television New Zealand resulted in the company being required to pay costs by the Broadcasting Standards Authority. In 2000 the Advertising Standards Complaints Board upheld a complaint by GALA, represented by Turner, about a pub promotion involving schoolboys; Turner had his first complaint upheld 23 years previously.
