= Alcohol advertising =

Promotion of alcoholic beverages

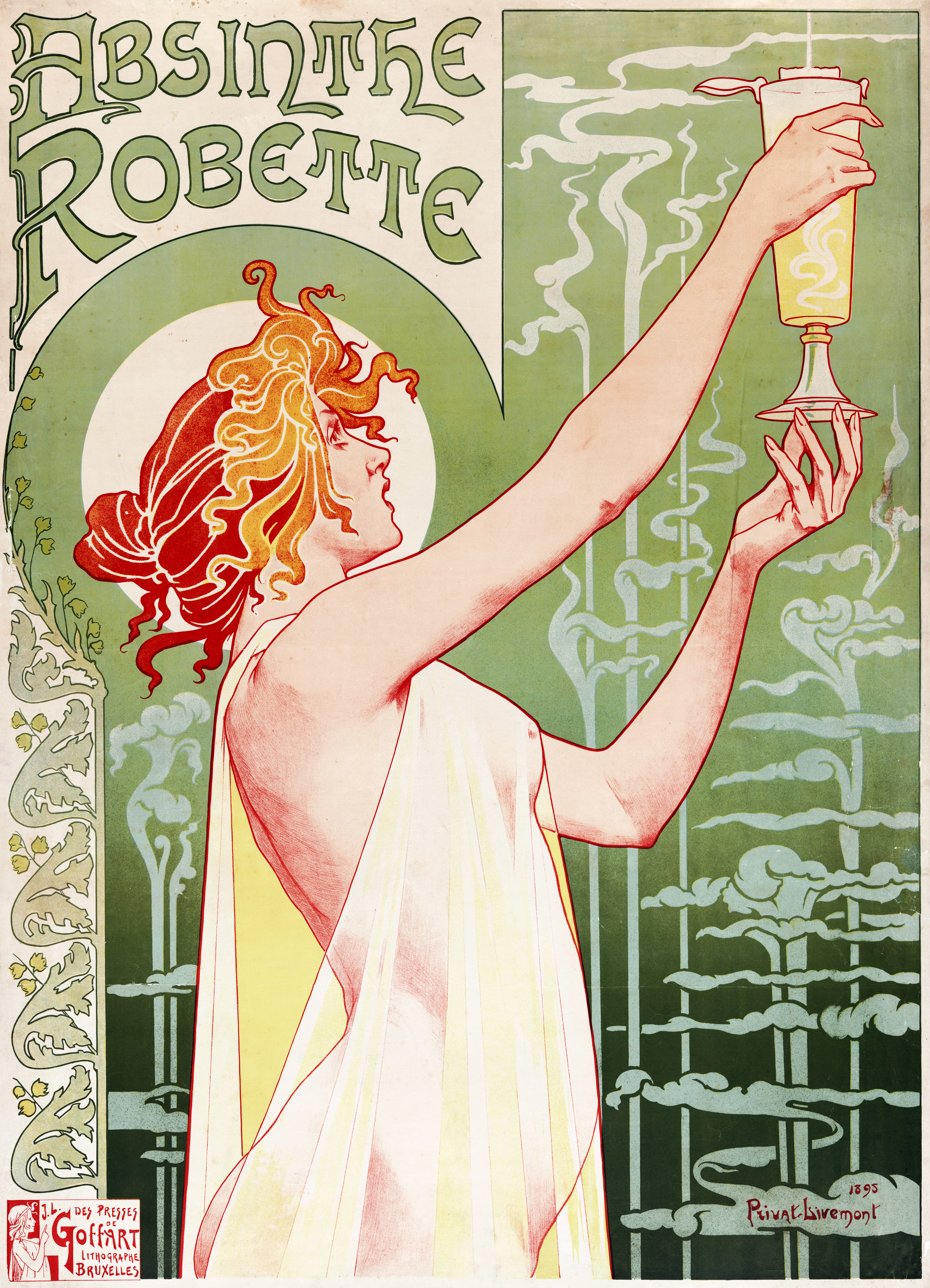
An 1896 advertisement for Absinthe Robette by Henri Privat-Livemont

Alcohol advertising is the promotion of alcoholic beverages by alcohol producers through a variety of media. Along with nicotine advertising, alcohol advertising is one of the most highly regulated forms of marketing. Some or all forms of alcohol advertising are banned in some countries.

== Criticism ==
Scientific research, health agencies and universities have, over the decades, been able to demonstrate a correlation between alcohol beverage advertising and alcohol consumption, especially among initially non-drinking youth. However, there is an equally significant body of research positing that alcohol advertising does not cause higher consumption and rather merely reflects greater public demand, with many commentators suggesting that effective alcohol campaigns only increase a producer's market share and brand loyalty.

== Target marketing ==
The intended audiences of the alcohol advertising campaigns have changed over the years, with some ads being specifically targeted towards a particular demographic. Some drinks are traditionally seen as male drinks, particularly beers. It is alleged that some brands have been specifically developed to appeal to people that would not normally drink that kind of beverage. These ads may contribute to underage consumption and binge drinking. In 2011 a study found that 22 percent of twelfth graders had binge drunk in the preceding two weeks; this figure doubled for college students. Studies published in 2014 suggested that the use of alcohol before the brain fully develops can alter or negatively affect its development.

=== Adolescents ===
One area in which the alcohol industry has faced criticism and tightened legislation is their alleged targeting of young people. Central to this is the development of alcopops – sweet-tasting, brightly coloured drinks with names that may appeal to a younger audience. Academics have found that the main factor influencing youth consumption of alcopops was taste and that young non-drinkers and experimental drinkers were heavily influenced by advertising.

There have been several disputes over whether alcohol advertisements are targeting teens. Much alcohol advertising appears to portray drinking as fun and exciting. Alcohol advertisements can be seen in virtually any medium and are widely found on the internet. Alcohol promoters are especially known for sponsoring sporting events, concerts and magazines. Most vendors' websites are nominally restricted to users 21 or older, but the only requirement is simply to enter a birth date. A study by the American Journal of Public Health concluded that Boston train passengers between the ages of 11 and 18 saw an alcohol-related advertisement every day. Similar studies support the allegation that consumption of alcohol by underage drinkers correlates with their exposure to alcohol ads. Many cities have recognized the effect of alcohol-related ads on adolescents, and some have banned these advertisements on public transportation.

Peter Anderson and his colleagues performed longitudinal studies and concluded that "alcohol advertising and promotion increases the likelihood that adolescents will start to use alcohol, and to drink more if they are already using alcohol". Elizabeth D. Waiters, Andrew J. Treno and Joel W. Grube's discussions with a sample of youth aged 9–15 support this claim. They found that these youth saw the purpose of beer commercials is to urge people to buy the product based not only on its quality, but also on "its relationship to sexual attractiveness". They see that "attractive young adults drink beer to personally rewarding ends" and the "youth-oriented music" and are influenced to drink alcohol.

The National Household Survey on Drug Abuse reports the rates of binge alcohol use in 2008 were 1.5 percent among youths 12 or 13 years old, 6.9 percent among those 14 or 15 years old, 17.2 percent for 16- and 17-year-olds, and 33.7 percent among those aged 18 to 20. In 2009, the rates for each group of underage alcohol usage increased by one-quarter.

According to the 2001 College Alcohol Study (CAS), continuous alcohol promotions and advertisements, including lowering prices on certain types of alcohol on a college campus, have increased the percentage of alcohol consumption of that college community. Alcohol advertising on college campuses has also been shown to increase binge drinking among students. However, it is concluded that the consistency of these special promotions and ads could also be useful in reducing binge drinking and other drinking-related problems on campus (Kuo, 2000, Wechsler 2000, Greenberg 2000, Lee 2000).

- Results from one study indicate that beer advertisements are a significant predictor of an adolescent's knowledge, preference and loyalty for beer brands, as well as their current drinking behavior and intentions to drink (Gentile, 2001).
- Television advertising changes attitudes about drinking. Young people report more positive feelings about drinking and their own likelihood to drink after viewing alcohol ads (Austin, 1994; Grube, 1994).
- The alcohol industry spends $2 billion per year on all media advertising (Strasburger, 1999).
- The beer brewing industry itself spent more than $770 million on television ads and $15 million on radio ads in 2000 (Center for Science in the Public Interest, 2002).

Research clearly indicates that, in addition to parents and peers, alcohol advertising and marketing significantly affect young people's decisions to drink (The Center on Alcohol Marketing and Youth [CAMY]).

"While many factors may influence an underage person's drinking decisions, including among other things parents, peers and the media, there is reason to believe that advertising also plays a role" (Federal Trade Commission, Self-Regulation in the Alcohol Industry, 1999).

Parents and peers substantially affect youth decisions to drink. However, research clearly indicates that alcohol advertising and marketing also have a significant effect by influencing youth and adult expectations and attitudes, and by helping to create an environment that promotes underage drinking.

Even though people these days must put themselves into that situation, David H. Jernigan (2005: 314) underlines how "more than fifteen percent of twelve-year-olds will be likely to create the situation where youth are more likely per capita to see the magazine than adults over twenty-one years, the legal drinking age in the United States".

=== Malt liquor ===
The target market for malt liquor in the United States has been urban African American and Hispanic populations. Advertisers use themes of power and sexual dominance to appeal to customers. Critics have objected to ads targeting this segment of the population, which has disproportionately high rates of alcohol-related illness and poor access to medical care.

== Advertising around the world ==
The World Health Organization (WHO) has directed that the advertising and promotion of alcohol needs to be controlled. In September 2005, the WHO Euro Region adopted a Framework for Alcohol Policy for the Region. This has five ethical principles which include the assertion that "All children and adolescents have the right to grow up in an environment protected from the negative consequences of alcohol consumption and, to the extent possible, from the promotion of alcoholic beverages".

Cross-border television advertising within the European Union was previously regulated by the 1989 Television without Frontiers Directive, a harmonisation measure designed to remove barriers to international trade as part of the common market. Article 15 of this Directive dictates that alcohol advertising on television "shall comply with the following criteria:

1. it may not be aimed specifically at minors or, in particular, depict minors consuming these beverages;
2. it shall not link the consumption of alcohol to enhanced physical performance or to driving;
3. it shall not create the impression that the consumption of alcohol contributes towards social or sexual success;
4. it shall not claim that alcohol has therapeutic qualities or that it is a stimulant, a sedative or a means of resolving personal conflicts;
5. it shall not encourage immoderate consumption of alcohol or present abstinence or moderation in a negative light;
6. it shall not place emphasis on high alcoholic content as being a positive quality of the beverages."

This article on alcohol advertising restrictions is implemented in each EU country largely through the self-regulatory bodies dealing with advertising.

The EU law 'TV without Frontiers' Directive has subsequently been expanded to cover new media formats such as digital television. Now called the 'Audiovisual Media Services Directive', the provisions regarding restrictions on alcohol advertising are laid out in Article 22 and are identical to the above.

Some countries, such as France, Norway, Russia, Ukraine, Myanmar, Sri Lanka, Kenya and Kazakhstan have banned all alcohol advertising on television and billboard.

=== United States ===
In the United States, spirits advertising has self-regulatory bodies that create standards for the ethical advertising of alcohol. The special concern is where advertising is placed.

Currently, the standard is that alcohol advertisements can only be placed in media where 71.6% of the audience is over the legal drinking age. Alcohol advertising's creative messages should not be designed to appeal to people under the age of 21, for example, using cartoon characters as spokespeople is discouraged. Advertising cannot promote brands based on alcohol content or its effects. Advertising must not encourage irresponsible drinking. Another issue in media placement is whether media vendors will accept alcohol advertising. The decision to accept an individual ad or a category of advertising is always at the discretion of the owner or publisher of a media outlet.

In 1991, U.S. Surgeon General Antonia Novello criticized alcoholic beverage companies for "unabashedly targeting teenagers" with "sexual imagery, cartoons, and rock and rap music" in television and print ads. In Rubin v. Coors Brewing Co. (1995), the Court unanimously struck down a federal regulation prohibiting the display of alcohol content on beer labels. The Court provided even more protection to alcohol advertising and amplified the Central Hudson test in 44 Liquormart, Inc. v. Rhode Island (1996). The Federal Trade Commission conducted an investigation in 2002 into possible targeting to those under the age of 21. However, this investigation and those of some scholars have not found evidence of such targeting. Concerns exist that irresponsible advertising practices or "pushing the envelope" with audience composition may lead to permanent legislation governing the advertising of beverage alcohol.

=== Asia ===
In Malaysia, alcohol advertising on radio and televisions was outlawed in 1995. On Malaysian television, alcohol advertising is not shown before 10:00 pm and during Malay-language programs. However, non-Malay newspapers and magazines are allowed to continue alcohol advertising. Supermarkets and hypermarkets have also been criticized for advertising alcohol products on trolleys, which is controversial because Islam is the state religion of the country.

In Singapore, alcohol advertisement is not allowed to be shown during programmes intended for children and young persons.

In Indonesia, alcohol advertising was legal in the 1990s, but has since been completely banned.

In Hong Kong, alcohol advertising is not allowed to be shown during Family Viewing Hour programmes.

In the Philippines, alcohol advertising is allowed. Alcohol warning is also shown in the end of the advertisement explaining with the words: "Drink Moderately". In May 2012, the warning was changed to "Drink Responsibly".

In Thailand, alcohol advertisements are still allowed, but must accompanied by a warning message. See Alcohol advertising in Thailand.

In Sri Lanka, public advertising on alcohol is banned totally since 2006.

In South Korea, public advertising on alcohol is only allowed after 10:00 pm.

=== Europe ===
In Latvia, advertising of alcohol in printed media and public signs was banned from March 1925 to May 1933. A ban on posters, illuminated and shop window advertising lasted until the Soviet occupation of Latvia in 1940. Today, the Handling of Alcoholic Beverages Law of 2004, Section 11 regulates the alcohol ad market. Advertising is banned from and on schools, medical facilities, on press cover pages, on public transportation and outdoors. In May 2023, the government submitted amendments to further restrict advertising, which are currently being debated in the Saeima.

In Russia, advertising alcohol products is banned from almost all media (including television and billboards) since January 2013. Before that, alcohol advertising was restricted from using images of people drinking since the mid-2000s.

In Sweden, since 2010 advertisements are legal for wine and beer, but not on television and radio. Non-periodic magazines are allowed to advertise alcoholic beverages above 15%. These advertisements must contain warnings, but which are worded less strongly than the warnings on tobacco products – for example, "Avoid drinking while pregnant," as opposed to "smoking kills." These rules were introduced into the law 2010 based on the provisions of an EU directive, provisionally applied by Swedish newspapers since 2005. Before that alcohol advertisements were forbidden, except for "class 1 beer" or "light beer." Such advertisements were common, as stronger beers which shared a name with advertised light beers, may have benefit from this.

In Finland, Parliament of Finland decided to ban alcohol outdoor advertising, except during sport events. This new law is going to take place in January 2015.

In the United Kingdom, the Advertising Standards Authority have banned several ads that do not comply with the restrictions in the EU directive.

In Norway, advertising for alcohol has been under a total ban since 1975.

In September 2017, Facebook announced it would allow users to hide all alcohol advertisements. The move is debated within the UK, as Alcohol Research UK group welcomed the change, while the Alcohol Standards Authority said the UK already had some of the strictest rules in the world.

In November 2018, Ireland introduced a law banning alcohol advertisements near schools, children play areas, public transportation, and cinemas, as well as restricting visibility of alcohol products in stores. The legislation was scheduled to take effect in November 2019.

=== Australia ===
In Australia the Alcoholic Beverages Advertising Code scheme regulates the marketing of alcohol. Advertisers need to follow a defined set of guidelines for showing alcohol advertisements on TV and radio. These ads are permitted from noon until 3 pm on school days and from 8:30 pm to 5 am every day. The ads cannot be targeted at kids and are not allowed during the broadcast of Children's (C) or Pre-school (P) classified programs on any day.

== Pinkwashing drinking campaigns ==
Many alcohol companies create campaigns to raise awareness and/or funds for a particular charity (typically through the use of a "ribbon" symbol associated with a specific condition). Companies do so through alcohol products and promotions and other marketing materials. Most ribbons are not trademarked or regulated, and thus companies are able to place the image on any product.

One ribbon in particular that is recognized world-wide – the pink breast cancer ribbon – has been used by multiple alcohol companies for promotion, a practice that is known as "pinkwashing". Alcohol consumption has been linked to an increased risk of multiple types of cancer, one of which is breast cancer. It has been found that even low levels of alcohol consumption (1 drink per day) increases a woman's risk of developing breast cancer. A U.S. study in 2013 found that 15% of breast cancer deaths among women were attributable to alcohol.

Due to this clear association, pinkwashed alcohol advertising has been criticized for promoting consumption of a product that contributes to the problem. As breast cancer is the most commonly occurring cancer for women, alcohol advertising that emphasizes funding to breast cancer societies may present the most harm to women, particularly when the amount of alcohol purchased is tied to the amount donated.

Nonetheless, many alcohol companies have donated substantial amounts to various cancer charities, which undoubtedly supports important causes.

== Responsible drinking campaigns ==
"Drink responsibly" messaging began in the 1970s, and is still widely used by the alcohol industry. It is almost never used by anyone else. It has been shown to be ineffective to counterproductive; for instance, adolescents become less opposed to drunkenness when exposed to "please drink responsibly" messages.

"Drink responsibly" messages are criticized by independent public-health advocates, who argue that they are designed to increase sales and avoid regulation using corporate social responsibility messaging. It has also been argued that "drink responsibly" messages shift blame for the social costs of alcohol onto individual people the industry designates as "problem drinkers" (often in poor and racialized communities, in which alcohol is disproportionately marketed), thus shifting responsibility away from the much more powerful industry promoting drinking. There are calls to replace these messages with mandatory, independently-designed and independently-tested alcohol warning labels.

"Drink responsibly" messages are very common in alcohol ads. They were found in nine in ten alcohol ads from U.S. magazines from 2008 to 2010 (where it was voluntary). Of these ads, none defined what responsible drinking was, or identified any time or circumstance when drinking alcohol would be inappropriate. Most "responsibly" messages were simply used to promote the product. Sometimes they were used in ads that showed behaviours like binge drinking. In all media, "drink responsibly" ads do not define any level of drinking as "responsible", and there is rarely any reference to national reduced-risk drinking guidelines.

There have also been various campaigns to help prevent alcoholism, under-age drinking and drunk driving. These include designated drivers and proof of age cards.

The industry-funded Drink Aware campaign for example, tells people to avoid binge drinking. The web site address is displayed as part of all of the adverts for products made by members of the group.

The Century Council, financially supported by a group of alcoholic beverage distillers in the United States, says it promotes responsible decision-making regarding drinking or non-drinking and works to reduce all forms of irresponsible consumption. Since its founding in 1991, it has invested over 175 million dollars in its programs.

A controversial anti-drunk-driving advertisement in South Africa threatened the public with rape in prison. The campaign took place with no reported complaints to the advertising standards authorities in 2010.

== Sponsorship in sport ==
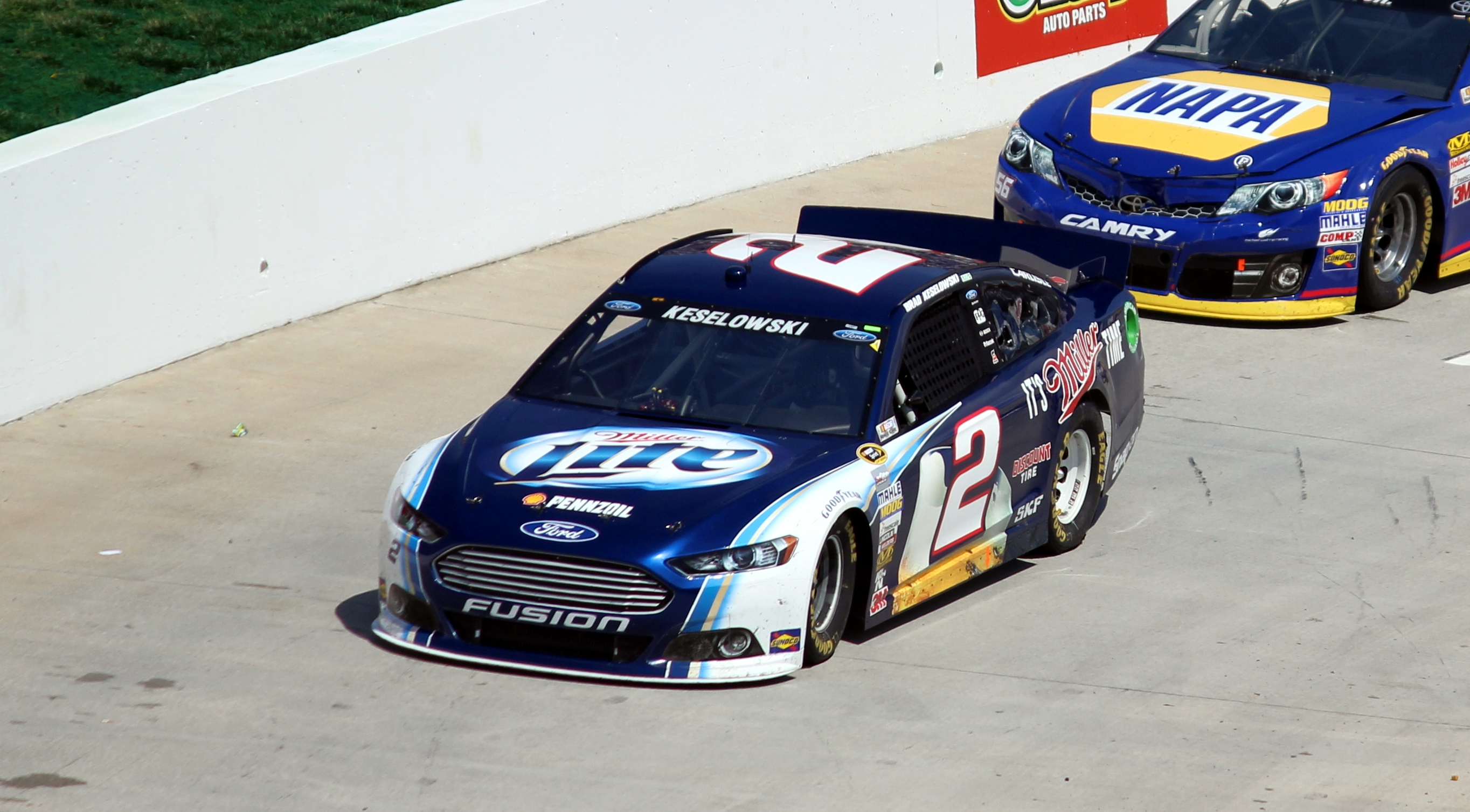
The Miller Lite sponsored car of Brad Keselowski in the NASCAR Sprint Cup Series

The sponsorship of sporting events and sportspeople by alcohol brands is banned in many countries. For example, the primary club competition in European rugby union, the Heineken Champions Cup, is called the H Cup in France because of that country's restrictions on alcohol advertising, while the Guinness Six Nations Championship is similarly branded as "Six Nations Greatness" (with "greatness" formatted in the same typeface and colour as the Guinness logo). However, such sponsorship is still common in other areas, such as the United States, although such sponsorship is controversial as minors are often a target audience for major professional sports leagues.

Alcohol advertising is common in motor racing competitions, and is particularly prominent in NASCAR and IndyCar. One major example of this was the Busch Series, sponsored by a brand of beer sold by Anheuser-Busch. That sponsorship, which started in the series' conversion from a national Late Model Sportsman races around the country to the present touring format in 1982, ended after 2007, with Nationwide Insurance, and later the cable television brand Xfinity, holding the naming rights to the series.

Budweiser, the flagship brand of Anheuser-Busch, has sponsored IndyCar drivers such as Mario Andretti, Bobby Rahal and Paul Tracy, as well as NASCAR Cup drivers such as Terry Labonte, Neil Bonnett, Darrell Waltrip, Bill Elliott, Dale Earnhardt Jr., Kasey Kahne and currently Kevin Harvick. Meanwhile, Miller has sponsored Al Unser, Danny Sullivan, Bobby Rahal, Rusty Wallace, Kurt Busch and Brad Keselowski.

Furthermore, NASCAR mandates drivers under 21 not be permitted to wear any alcohol-branded sticker on their cars. In cases with below drinking age drivers, a specialised "Coors Pole Award – 21 Means 21" sticker is placed on such drivers' cars. One team, Petty Enterprises, refuses to participate in alcohol advertising and forfeits all alcohol monies and bonuses.

For distilled spirits, teams must run a responsible drinking sticker clearly visible on the car. For Jack Daniel's, the theme is "Pace Yourself, Drink Responsibly", and includes on NASCAR's Web site a waving yellow flag warning drinkers. For Crown Royal, the television ads feature the car with the slogan "Be a champion, Drink Responsibly" and it acting as a pace car to drivers, warning them of responsibility. Jim Beam has radio ads and NASCAR mandated statements about alcohol control. None of the three, however, is a full-time sponsor, as they alternate sponsorship with other products unrelated to their firm on the car. (Jim Beam's parent, Fortune Brands, sometimes has its Moen Faucets replace Jim Beam on the car in selected races.)

Although tobacco companies have been the main source of financial backing in Formula One, some alcohol brands have also been associated with the sport. For example, Martini appears on the Williams F1 car while Johnnie Walker has sponsored McLaren since 2006.

Anheuser-Busch, being a conglomerate with non-alcoholic properties, complies with the French alcohol advertising ban in Formula One by placing their Busch Entertainment theme park logos (mostly SeaWorld) where their Budweiser logo would appear on the Williams F1 car at races where alcohol advertising is banned and in Middle Eastern countries, where alcohol advertising is discouraged. A few companies, however, have added responsible drinking campaigns with their sponsorship, notably the 1989–90 BTCC Ford Sierra RS500 of Tim Harvey and Laurence Bristow, which was sponsored by Labatt. Throughout the two seasons, the car bore a "Please Don't Drink and Drive" message.

Some stadiums, particularly in the U.S., have bared the names of breweries or beer brands via naming rights arrangements, such as Busch Stadium, Coors Field, and Miller Park; those three venues are all in or near the cities of their headquarters—St. Louis, Denver, and Milwaukee. The naming rights to Miller Park have since been bought by Madison, Wisconsin-based American Family Insurance.

Diageo are a major sponsor of many sporting events through their various brands. For example, Johnnie Walker sponsor the Championship at Gleneagles and Classic golf tournaments along with the Team McLaren Formula One car.

Cricket is a sport with a large amount of alcohol sponsorship. The 2005 Ashes, for example, featured sponsorship hoardings by brands such as Red Stripe, Thwaites Lancaster Bomber and Wolf Blass wines. In nations like India and Sri Lanka where alcoholic advertising is generally prohibited, those regulations are rounded with distillers offering clothing lines and sports equipment marked with one of their brands or separate soft drink or bottled water lines within tournaments such as the Indian Premier League and test matches, such as United Spirits Limited's McDowell's No.1 and Pernod Ricard's Royal Stag.

Rugby union also has a substantial amount of alcohol sponsorship. The All Blacks feature Steinlager sponsorship prominently. The Scotland national team has a long-established relationship with The Famous Grouse, a brand of Scotch whisky. Wales has a more recent relationship with the Brains brewery (But wear "Brawn" when playing in France), and the Springboks of South Africa agreed for South African Breweries to put the Lion Lager, then, the Castle Lager brand on their shirt until 2004. Magners was the title sponsor of the Celtic League, the top competition in Ireland, Scotland and Wales. Guinness was the title sponsor of the Premiership, the top competition in England, and now sponsor The Six Nations Championship (the logo is replaced with "Six Nations, Greatness" in France.) Beer brand Tooheys New was the Australian sponsor of the Southern Hemisphere Super 14 competition through the 2006 season. Bundaberg Rum is one of the sponsors of the Australia national rugby union team.

Rugby league in Australia is sponsored by Victoria Bitter and Bundaberg Rum.

== Campaigns ==
=== Absolut ===
Absolut vodka is made in Sweden and was introduced to the United States in the year 1979. Its launch was a true challenge due to a variety of factors: Sweden was not perceived as a vodka-producing country, the bottle was very awkward for bartenders to use, and vodka was perceived as a cheap, tasteless drink. Absolut's advertising campaign by TBWA exploited the shape of the bottle to create clever advertisements that caused people to become involved in the advertising, and the brand took off.

=== Alcohol sponsorship in sport ===
Sport has been suggested to be one of the primary, if not the dominant, medium for the promotion of alcohol and drinking to the general population with the majority of advertising spend an advertising placement occurring in sport. Work from New Zealand and Australia shows that sponsorship of sports participants or athletes is associated with more hazardous drinking, with calls from the UK, Australia, and New Zealand, for bans on alcohol industry sponsorship and advertising in sport.

=== Guinness ===
Guinness' iconic stature can be attributed in part to its advertising campaigns. One of the most notable and recognizable series of adverts was created by S.H. Benson's advertising, primarily John Gilroy, in the 1930s and 1940s. Gilroy was responsible for creating posters which included such phrases such as "Guinness for Strength", "It's a Lovely Day for a Guinness", and most famously, "Guinness is Good For You". The posters featured Gilroy's distinctive artwork and more often than not featured animals such as a kangaroo, ostrich, seal, lion, and notably a toucan, which has become as much a symbol of Guinness as the Trinity College Harp. Guinness advertising paraphernalia attracts high prices on the collectible market.

In a campaign reminiscent of viral marketing techniques, one advert quickly appeared as a screensaver distributed over the Internet. It was a simple concept, featuring Dublin actor Joe McKinney dancing around the drink while it was given time to settle. The accompanying music (mambo tune Guaglione by Pérez Prado) was released as a single and reached number one on the Irish charts in September 1994 and number two on the UK charts in May 1995 (see List of number-one singles of 1994 (Ireland) List of UK top 10 singles in 1995).

In Malaysia, Singapore, and Hong Kong, Guinness launched an $8 million advertising campaign using the fictional character of Adam King to promote the embodiment of Guinness as a man could be incredibly powerful. The advertising campaign was handled by advertising firm, Saatchi & Saatchi.

In Africa, the character of Michael Power has been used since 1999 to boost sales.

== See also ==
- Group Against Liquor Advertising (GALA) (in New Zealand)
- Cannabis advertising
