= Henderson, Alabama =

- Unincorporated community
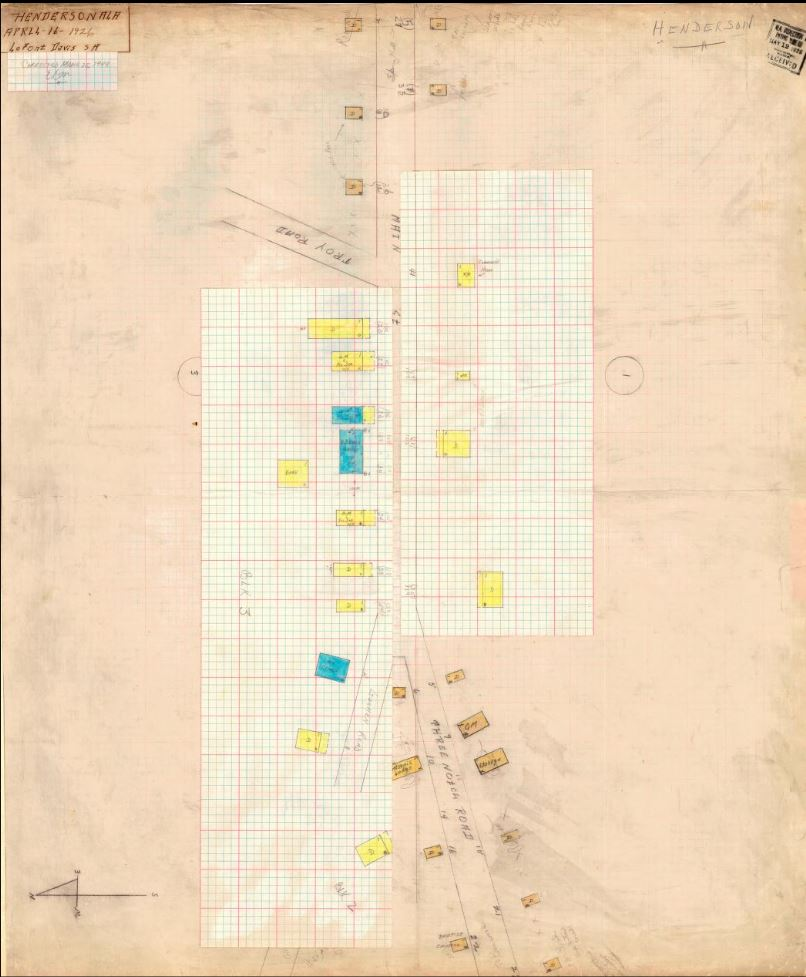
- 1926 fire insurance map of Henderson

- Location within Alabama Location within the United States
- Coordinates: 31°40′00″N 86°04′24″W
- Country: United States
- State: Alabama
- County: Pike
- Elevation: 420 ft (130 m)
- Time zone: UTC-6 (Central (CST))
  - Summer (DST): UTC-5 (CDT)
- Area code: 334
- GNIS feature ID: 119946

Henderson, also known as Gainers Store, is an unincorporated community in Pike County, Alabama, United States.

== History ==
Henderson was named for Eli Henderson, an early settler who moved to the area from Edgefield District, South Carolina. A post office operated under the name Gainers Store from 1830 to 1860 and under the name Henderson from 1860 to 1907.

== Notable natives ==
- Charles Henderson, the 35th Governor of Alabama from 1915 to 1919
- Fox Henderson, businessman and banking entrepreneur
- Jeremiah Augustus Henderson, businessman and captain in the Confederate States Army
