= SS Charles Henderson =

World War II Liberty ship of the United States

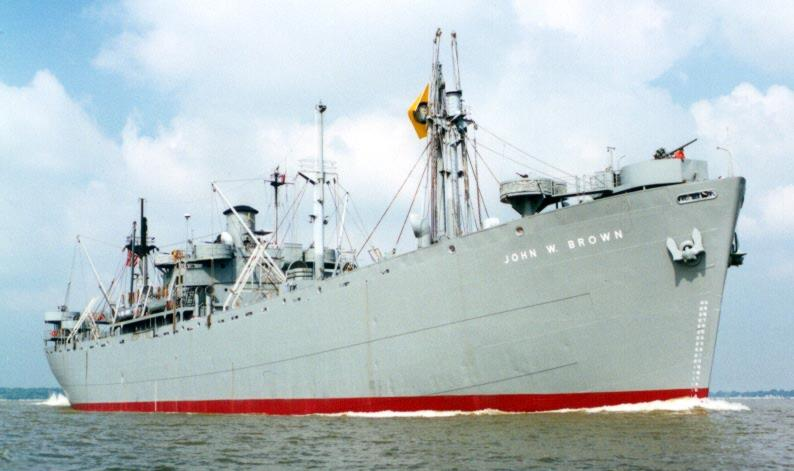
- Charles Henderson was a standard Liberty ship, similar to SS John W. Brown, seen here.

History

United States
- Name: Charles Henderson
- Namesake: Charles Richmond Henderson
- Builder: Delta Shipbuilding Company, New Orleans, Louisiana
- Yard number: 1043
- Laid down: 29 March 1943
- Launched: 1 May 1943
- Completed: 19 May 1943
- Out of service: 9 April 1945
- Fate: Exploded while unloading cargo at Bari, Italy, 9 April 1945

General characteristics
- Class & type: Type EC2-S-C1 Liberty ship
- Propulsion: Single screw

SS Charles Henderson was a Liberty ship constructed during World War II. It was destroyed in an ammunition explosion on April 9, 1945.

== Namesake ==
The ship was named for Charles Henderson, the governor of Alabama from 1915 to 1919.

== Service ==
The vessel was operated by the Mississippi Shipping Company, based in New Orleans, on behalf of the War Shipping Administration, starting from 1943.

On 21 January 1944, the Charles Henderson collided with the coastal tanker MV Plattsburgh Socony near Cape Henlopen, Delaware. The collision resulted in a fire on the tanker. "Fourth Naval District officers said one of the ships burst into flames after the collision and was abandoned an hour later." One seaman was reported missing, and four others suffered burns. "A navy picket boat drew alongside the burning tanker – and 'stayed despite the danger of the ship exploding at any moment' – to rescue four crewmen marooned on the bow. Other survivors escaped in a lifeboat."

Loading in June 1944, the Charles Henderson was one of many vessels at Normandy for the invasion of Europe.

The ship sailed from New York City on 25 February 1945, bound for Norfolk, Virginia. There it loaded 6,675 tons of aircraft bombs in its holds. With loading complete, it steamed for Bari, Italy on 9 March, but returned the same day to repair its condenser's main induction valve. The ship waited five days for the next Mediterranean-bound convoy, UGS-80. Upon arriving at Gibraltar, the Charles Henderson proceeded independently to Bari, via Augusta, Sicily, arriving 5 April.

== Fate ==
In one of the largest ammunition disasters of World War II, the Charles Henderson was being unloaded at berth 14 at Bari, in Southern Italy, on 9 April 1945, when she was destroyed in a large explosion. "This detonation caused by [handling] 500 pound [230 kg] bombs loaded with Composition B, killed 542 and injured 1,800. It is believed the bombs were hooked and dragged to the well, then lifted without mats. The crew may have hurried because the contract paid by number of items lifted. Buildings along the waterfront were destroyed for 2,000 feet [610 m]. Ships were severely damaged to 2,100 feet [640 m]."

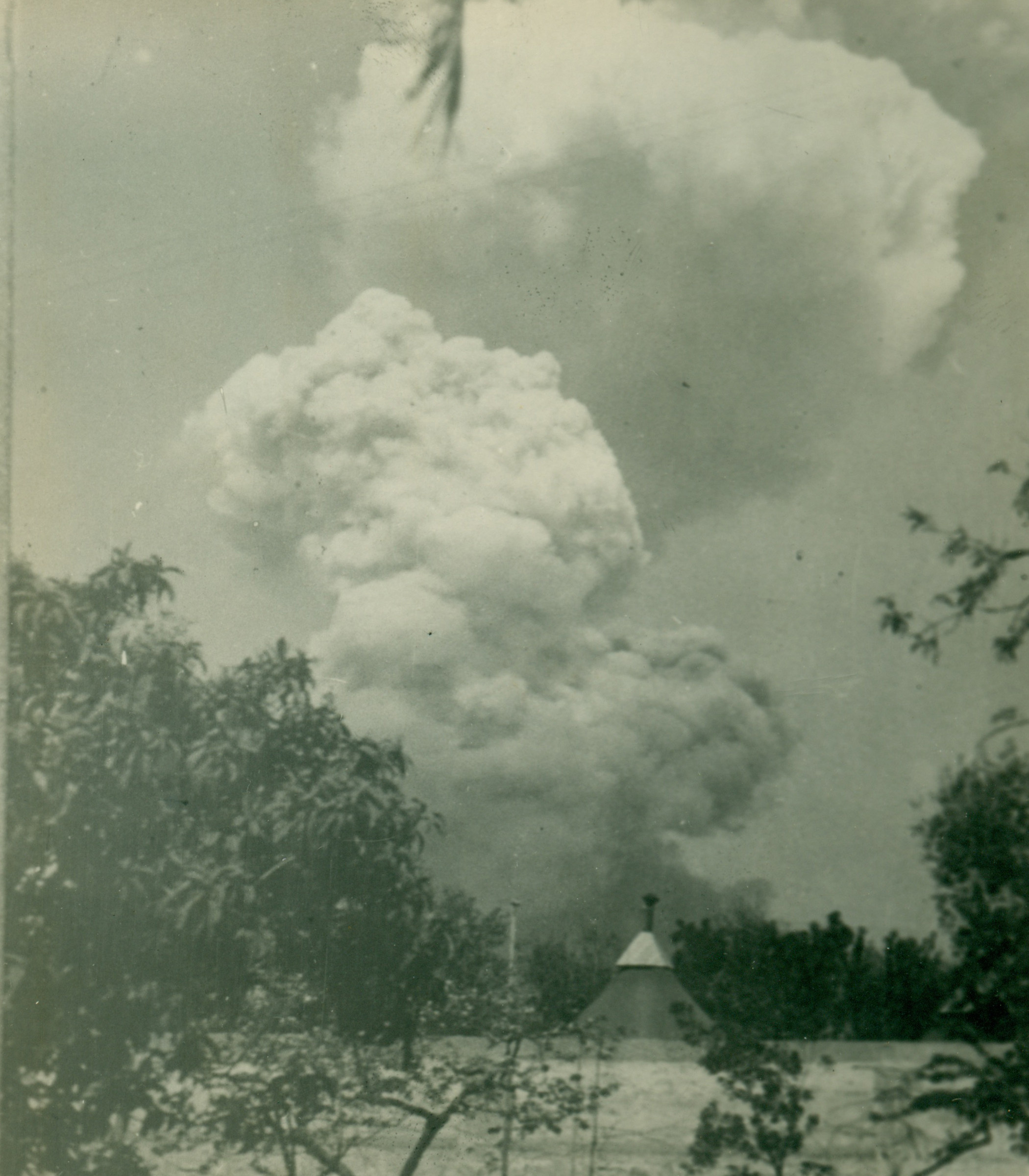
9 April 1945 – Photo by WOJG Hubert Platt Henderson who was stationed at Bari as the Director of the 773rd Band

39 crew and 13 armed guards were killed in the explosion. The chief engineer was ashore at the time of the blast, and did not perish. The wreck remained in Bari until 1948, when it was sold for scrap.

== See also ==
- Air raid on Bari

== Gallery ==
9 April 1945 - View from the barracks

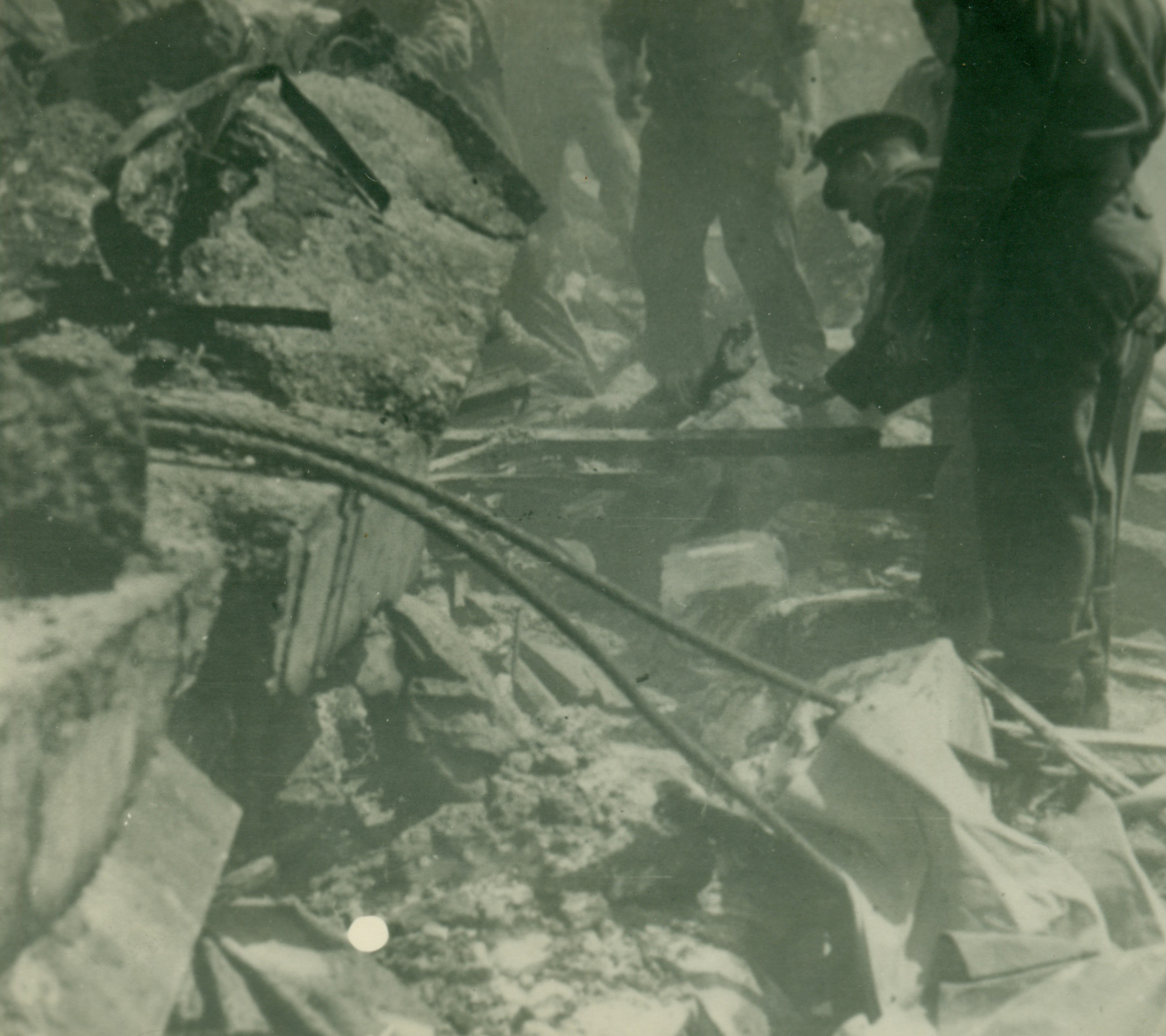
9 April 1945

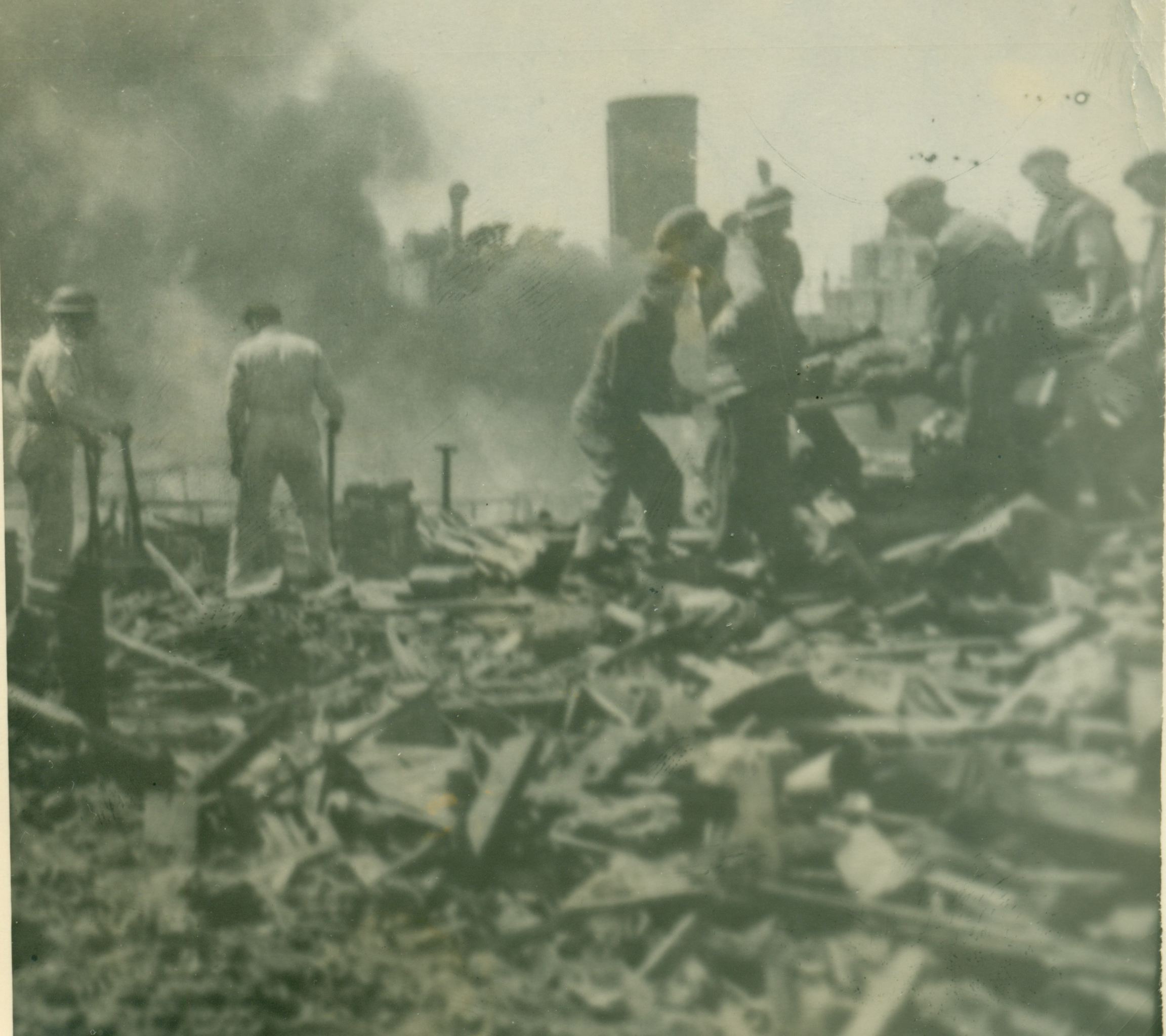
9 April 1945

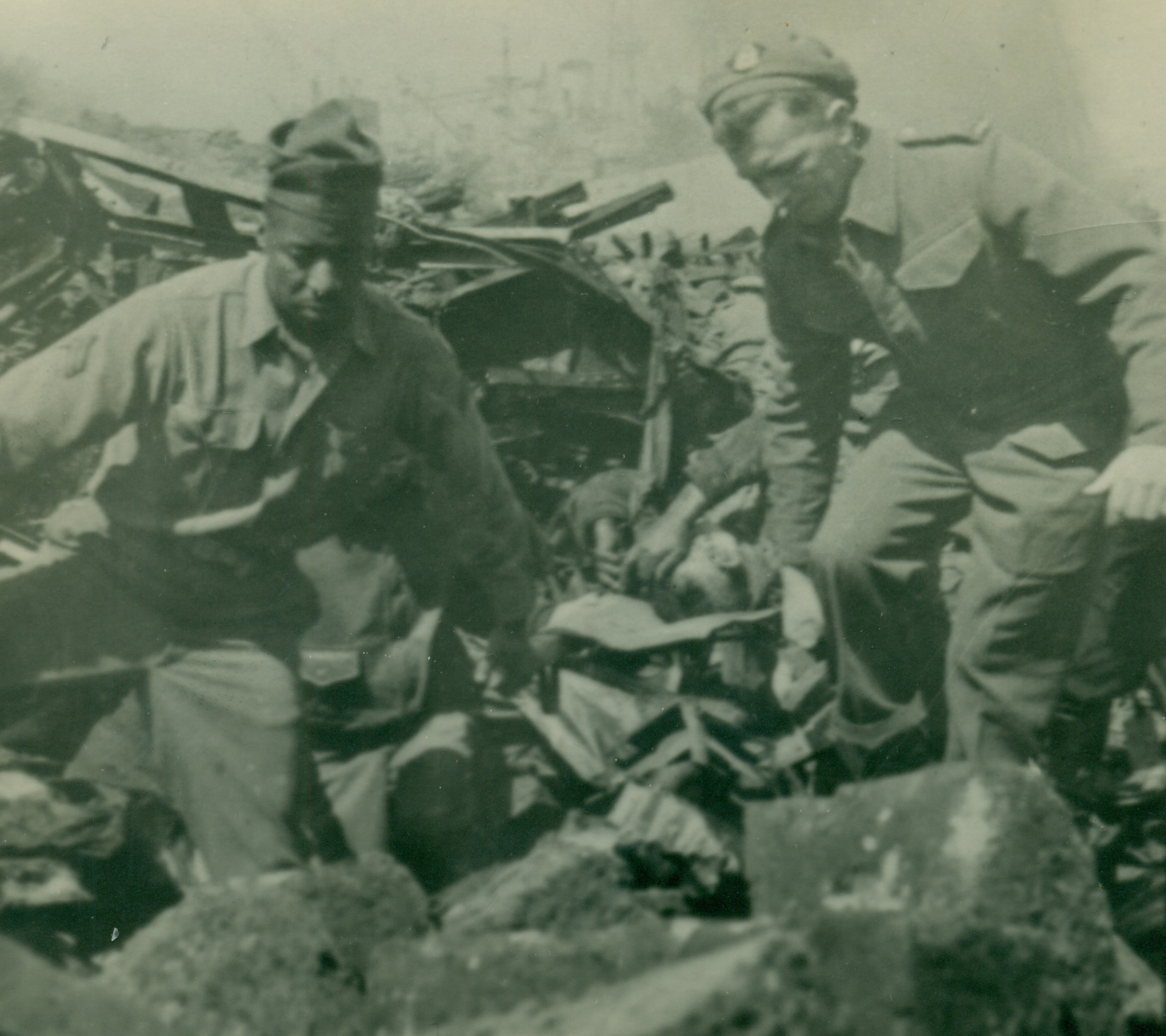
9 April 1945

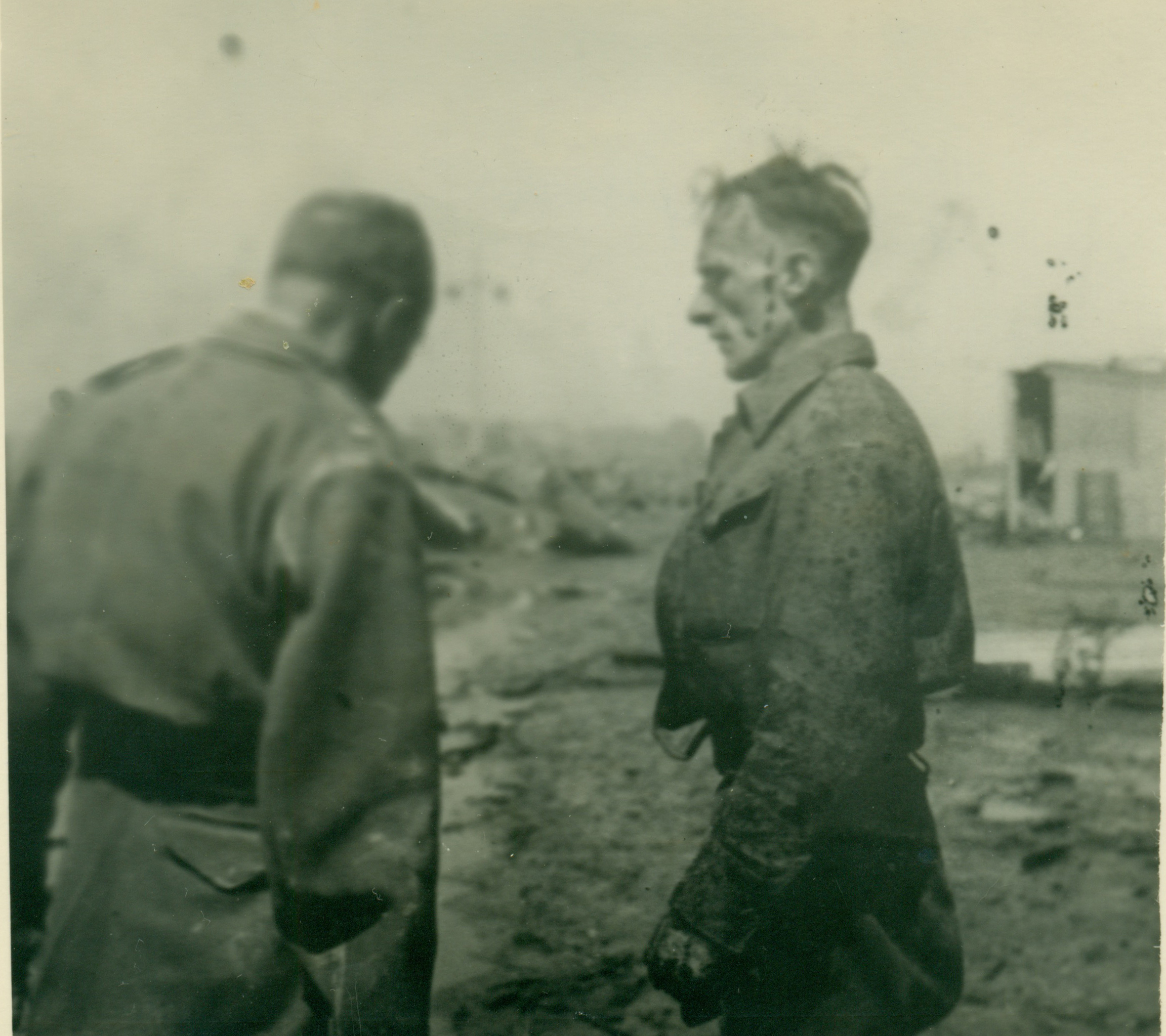
9 April 1945

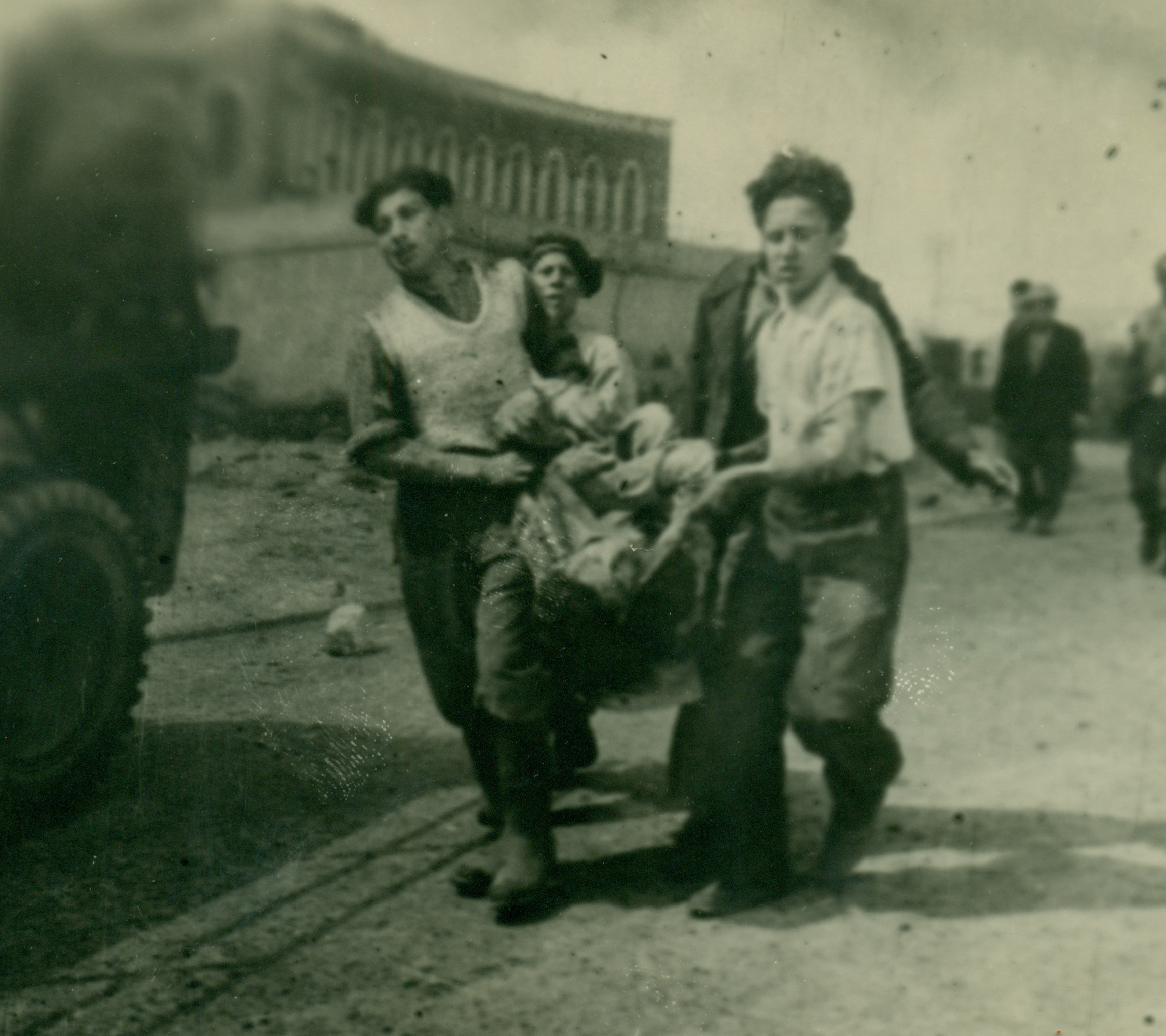
9 April 1945
