= 1914 Alabama gubernatorial election =

- November 3, 1914
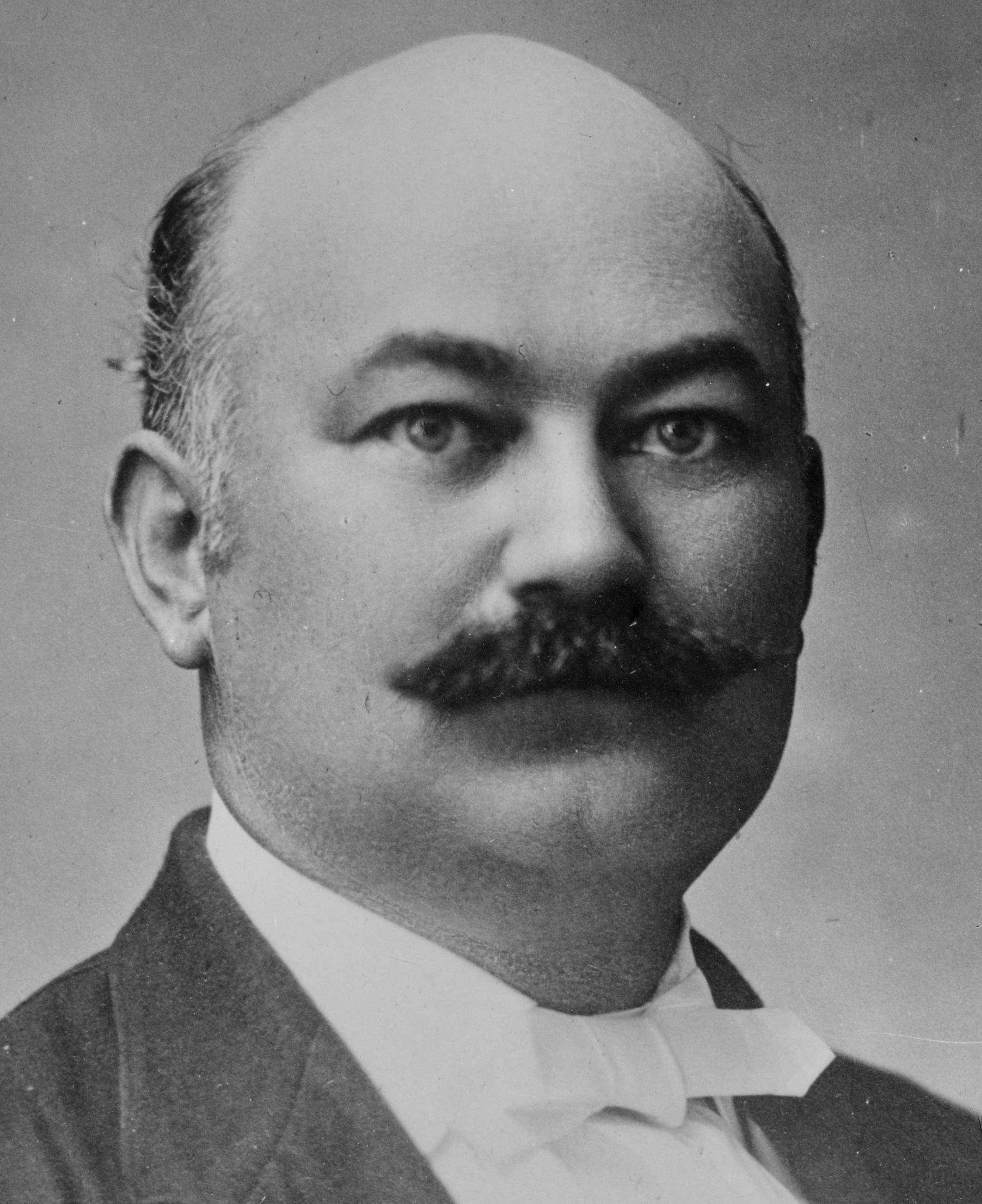

Nominee	Charles Henderson	John B. Shields
Party	Democratic	Republican
Popular vote	61,307	11,773
Percentage	78.72%	15.11%
County results
Henderson
40–50%
50–60%
60–70%
70–80%
80–90%
90–100%
Shields
60–70%
Cross
50–60%
Unknown/No Vote
Governor before election
Emmet O'Neal
Democratic
Elected Governor
Charles Henderson
Democratic

The 1914 Alabama gubernatorial election took place on November 3, 1914, in order to elect the governor of Alabama. Democratic incumbent Emmet O'Neal was term-limited, and could not seek a second consecutive term.

== Results ==
1914 Alabama gubernatorial election
Party	Candidate	Votes	%
Democratic	Charles Henderson	61,307	78.72
Republican	John B. Shields	11,773	15.12
Progressive	E.H. Cross	3,611	4.64
Socialist	W.C. Swain	1,186	1.52
Total votes		77,877	100.00
Democratic hold			
