= Laura Montgomery Henderson =

First Lady of Alabama (1915–1919)

- Henderson in 1887.

First Lady of Alabama
- In office January 18, 1915 – January 20, 1919
- Governor: Charles Henderson
- Preceded by: Elizabeth Kirkman O'Neal
- Succeeded by: Mary Elizabeth Clark Kilby

Personal details
- Born: Laura Montgomery; May 2, 1867 Warrenton, North Carolina, U.S.
- Died: December 28, 1940 (aged 73)
- Political party: Democratic
- Spouse: Charles Henderson
- Education: St. Mary's Junior College
- Occupation: clubwoman

Laura Montgomery Henderson (May 2, 1867 – December 28, 1940) was an American clubwoman and civic leader who served as First Lady of Alabama from 1915 to 1919. In addition to serving as State president of the Alabama Federation of Women’s Clubs, she was a leader in the civic, patriotic and religious life of the state. During World War I, she was one of the four-minute speakers. The Henderson Hall dormitory at Troy Normal School (now, Troy University), was named in her honor.

== Early life and education ==
Laura Parker Montgomery was born May 2, 1867, in Warrenton, North Carolina. She was the daughter of Thomas Alexander and Sarah Hill (Dowtin) Montgomery, the former a Confederate States soldier, planter and commission merchant, who removed to New Orleans, Louisiana, in 1871, where he died two years later. She was a granddaughter of William and Charlotte (Jordan) Montgomery, planter, and of Maj. Anthony and Mary (Adams) Dowtin, all of Warren County, North Carolina, the latter couple living at "White Oak Grove", the Dowtin ancestral home. She was a great-granddaughter of Seth and Martha (Ward) Jordan, of Bute County, North Carolina, and of John Dowtin, of Warren County, North Carolina, who served in the Revolutionary War, and was buried in that county with his forefathers who emigrated to North Carolina from Wales in an early period of U.S. history. She was a great-great-granddaughter of Benjamin Ward, a member of the Halifax congress, which met in Halifax County, North Carolina, November 12, 1776, to frame the State constitution, and was also a prominent member of the Provincial council of safety, proposing the measure, immediately adopted, whereby each head of a family became a member of the committee of safety, and was high sheriff of Bute County, from which both Warren and Granville counties were formed. The Montgomery family is of French origin, the name being spelled formerly Montgomerie, the American founder being William Montgomery, whose ancestors were French Huguenots who were expelled from their native country during a period of religious persecution, going first to England, and then to Scotland and to Ireland.

Henderson was educated in the public schools of Raleigh, North Carolina and at St. Mary's Episcopal college, Raleigh.

== Career ==
After graduation, she taught for a year and a half (Note: According to Leonard (1914), Henderson taught for two and a half years.) in the State normal school at Troy, Alabama, and showed an interest in educational affairs in that state.

She served as president of the Pike County school improvement association during 1906-07-08, and was elected to membership on the school board of Troy, but did not accept. The club women of Alabama selected her as president of the State federation in 1912 and reelected her for a second term the year following.

On November 7, 1888, in Raleigh, North Carolina, she married Charles Henderson. During the four years of her husband's service as governor of Alabama, 1915–1918, she presided at the governor's mansion with distinction, and her talents as a public speaker were under constant requisition.

During World War I, she was one of the four-minute speakers.

Henderson served as president of the Nineteenth Century Literary Club and of the School Improvement Association. She was one of many vice-presidents of the Southern Industrial Association, Washington, D.C. She was a member of the Colonial Dames and the Daughters of the Confederacy. In politics, she was a Democrat.

In religion, she was Episcopalian, serving as president of the Woman's missionary auxiliary of that church during 1918-19-20. She was also one of the five field secretaries of Alabama Episcopal Missionary Auxiliaries.

== Death and legacy ==
Laura Montgomery Henderson died December 28, 1940.

Henderson Hall, a female dormitory at Troy Normal School, was named in her honor.
