= Office of Alcohol and Other Drug Abuse =

The Office of Alcohol and Other Drug Abuse at the American Medical Association (AMA) was established by the temperance-oriented Robert Wood Johnson Foundation with an initial grant of $5 million, followed by more substantial funding.

As a national program office of the foundation, it established and is promoting the "A Matter of Degree" program. This is a major campus and community partnership demonstration project at ten colleges and universities across the United States. The goal of the program was to encourage local communities and campus administrations to work together to reduce situations and environments that would encourage high-risk or binge drinking among students. Preliminary results of its effectiveness have not been positive.

Other projects focus on reducing alcoholic beverage advertising, changing parental behaviors related to alcohol consumption, and alcoholic beverage taxes.
