= Alcohol advertising in Thailand =

Laws pertaining to Thailand's alcohol advertising

Thailand regulates alcohol advertising under the Alcoholic Beverage Control Act, BE 2551 (2008). Under section 32 of the law, alcoholic beverages may not be advertised in a manner which directly or indirectly claims benefits or promotes its consumption, and may not show the product or its packaging. Under a declaration issued in an order with the act, all advertisements must also be accompanied by one out of five predefined warning messages, lasting at least two seconds for video advertisements or occupying at least 25 percent of the advertisement area for print media.

Prior to the enactment of the law, all broadcast television channels adhered to a voluntary ban on alcohol advertising between 05:00 and 22:00 except during sports broadcasts. This ban was issued by the Public Relations Department following a cabinet resolution dated 29 July 2003.

== Opposition ==
During the drafting of the bill, it faced opposition from businesses and lobbies. In the view of advertisers, the ban would slash advertising revenue by around one billion baht. Nonetheless, the Kasikorn Research Center opined that this regulation would only affect revenue short-term in 2007, given that alcohol advertising represents only 2-3 percent of the total advertising expenditures in all media. In addition, the president of the Advertising Association of Thailand (AAT), Witawat Jayapani, commented that the ban would hurt Thai beverage companies in competition with foreign entrepreneurs because the Thai government cannot control the black market import of goods. Witawat also urged the government to focus on other media channels, citing the ease with which alcohol reaches young people.

== See also ==
- Alcohol packaging warning label
