= Wexler =

Wexler may refer to:

- Wexler (surname), including a list of people with the name
- Mount Wexler, United States
- Wexler (crater), lunar impact crater

== See also ==
- Wechsler (disambiguation)
