= Ariosto A. Wiley =

American politician

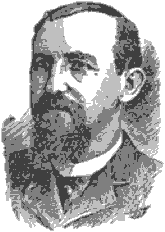

Member of the U.S. House of Representatives from Alabama's 2nd district
- In office March 4, 1901 – June 17, 1908
- Preceded by: Jesse F. Stallings
- Succeeded by: Oliver C. Wiley

Member of the Alabama Senate
- In office 1890-1893; 1898-1899

Member of the Alabama House of Representatives
- In office 1884-1885; 1884-1889; 1896-1897

Personal details
- Born: Ariosto Appling Wiley; November 6, 1848 Clayton, Alabama
- Died: June 17, 1908 (aged 59) Hot Springs, Virginia
- Party: Democratic

Ariosto Appling Wiley (November 6, 1848 – June 17, 1908) was an American lawyer, Spanish-American War veteran, and politician who served four terms as a U.S. representative from Alabama from 1901 until his death in office in 1908.

He was the brother of Oliver Cicero Wiley, who was his successor in Congress.

== Early life ==
Born to Jacob McCaleb and Cornelia Appling Wiley in Clayton, Alabama, Ariosto A. Wiley moved with his parents to Troy, Alabama. He had four siblings and attended the common schools and was graduated from Emory and Henry College, Emory, Virginia, in 1870. He stayed there and studied law, was admitted to the bar in 1871 and commenced practice in Clayton, Alabama. He moved to Montgomery, Alabama, the same year and continued the practice of law, partnering with former Alabama Supreme Court justice Samuel F. Rice and local judge Thomas Goode Jones.

== Military service ==
He was captain of a Cavalry troop of the Alabama National Guard and later a lieutenant colonel commanding the Second Regiment of Infantry of the Alabama National Guard. He was appointed by President McKinley on June 9, 1898, lieutenant colonel of the Fifth Regiment, United States Volunteer Infantry, and served during the Spanish–American War. He served as legal adviser and chief of staff to Gen. Henry W. Lawton in Santiago, Cuba, and assisted Gen. Leonard Wood in the establishment of civil government in the eastern Province of Cuba.

== Politics ==
Wiley served extensively in both chambers of the Alabama state legislature. He served as member of the Alabama House of Representatives in 1884, 1885, 1888, 1889, 1896, and 1897. He served in the Alabama Senate from 1890 to 1893, in 1898, and in 1899.

He served as delegate to the Democratic National Convention twice during the 1880s.

=== Congress ===
In 1900, Wiley was elected as a Democrat to an open seat in Alabama’s 2nd congressional district that was created by the retirement of Jesse Francis Stallings. He won re-election three times and served in the Fifty-seventh and three succeeding Congresses from March 4, 1901, until his death at Hot Springs, Virginia, June 17, 1908.

Wiley served on the House committees with oversight over militia and pensions. His work included legislation aimed at improving military organization, assisting Alabama homesteaders, and infrastructure improvements along the Alabama River. He also supported rural mail service in Alabama and worked to bring to his home state some relics of the Spanish-American War.

== Death ==
Wiley suffered from rheumatism, which slowed his activities considerably. By 1908, his health had deteriorated and he traveled to Warm Springs, Georgia in the hopes of finding relief. He died there on June 17, 1908, and was interred in Oakwood Cemetery, Montgomery, Alabama.

His brother Oliver was elected to fill the remainder of his seat.

== See also ==
- List of members of the United States Congress who died in office (1900–1949)

U.S. House of Representatives
Preceded by Jesse F. Stallings	Member of the U.S. House of Representatives from Alabama's 2nd congressional district March 4, 1901 – June 17, 1908	Succeeded by Oliver C. Wiley
