= Jeremiah Augustus Henderson =

American businessman and Confederate Army captain

Jeremiah Augustus Henderson was a businessman and captain of the Confederate Army from Gainers Store, Alabama. His sons include Charles Henderson, former governor of Alabama, and Fox Henderson, a successful banking and business entrepreneur.

== Early life ==
Jeremiah Augustus ("Gus") Henderson was born June 12, 1832, in Gainers Store, Alabama (now Henderson, Alabama). He spent his childhood and teenage years helping out in the store owned by his parents, Eli and Mary Darby Henderson. This early exposure to business would have a profound effect on his adulthood: As Henderson grew up, he expanded his businesses and gained a reputation for both his leadership skills and his business savvy.

== The Civil War ==
As tensions built between the North and the South, Henderson was chosen as one of three delegates to represent Pike County at Alabama's state secession convention. Henderson, a member of the Whig party, was personally opposed to secession, but he acted in accordance with his constituents and voted in favor of secession from the Union.

Alabama officially seceded from the Union on January 11, 1861. A few months later, the American Civil War began after Confederate troops attacked Fort Sumter in South Carolina. Unsure of the future, Henderson sold all of his businesses and invested the money in land before joining the Confederate Army. Henderson was a captain in the 57th Alabama Infantry Unit, Company B; he remained in the Confederate Army throughout the duration of the war.

== Return to Pike County ==
After the Civil War ended, Henderson returned home to Gainers Store. He began farming on some of his land, and he opened a mercantile store with $550 of his father's money. His business expanded rapidly, and Henderson found it difficult to transport and receive shipments by wagon. In 1869, Henderson moved his mercantile business to the nearby city of Troy, Alabama to be closer to the Mobile and Girard Railroad. Henderson quickly became one of the most successful (and wealthiest) businessmen in southeastern Alabama; his trade extended beyond Troy to other parts of Alabama and Florida.

== Family life ==
Gus Henderson married Mildred Elizabeth ("Millie") Hill when he was 21 years old. The couple had seven children, including future Alabama governor Charles Henderson and future Troy business leader Fox Henderson.

Jeremiah "Gus" Henderson died suddenly on April 6, 1877. He was 46 years old. He is buried with his wife, Mildred, in Oakwood Cemetery in Troy, Alabama. Henderson's direct descendants living today include Jeremiah Augustus ("Jere") Henderson II and Jeremiah Augustus ("Jeremy") Henderson III.

On September 26, 2025, in the city of Valencia, Spain, another heir was born with the name Jeremiah Augustus (“Jay”) Henderson IV.
