= Alcohol advertising on college campuses =

Many college campuses throughout the United States have some form of alcohol advertising including flyers on bulletin boards to mini billboard signs on college buses. It is so prevalent on college campuses especially because college students are considered the "targeted marketing group," meaning that college students are more likely to consume larger quantities of alcohol than any other age group, which makes them the prime consumers of alcohol in the United States.

The alcohol industry has tried to actively mislead the public about the risk of cancer due to alcohol consumption, in addition to campaigning to remove laws that require alcoholic beverages to have cancer warning labels.

== Research and statistics ==
According to an economic research done by Henry Saffer, who is a PH.D researcher for the National Bureau of Economic Research, "Product personalities are designed to appeal to specific market segments. For example, in targeting young people, Coors beer is associated with an unspoiled wilderness, whereas Budweiser is associated with athletic success". By sending these messages to its audiences, beer companies make sure those students consume their specific brand of alcohol so that they can appear more athletic or whatever lifestyle the ads promise. The more appealing the beer and alcohol companies make their advertisements, the more students will consume their particular brand of products on campus and also, most likely, for life.

A 2001 study was done by the College Alcohol Study (CAS) of the Harvard School of Public Health. Researchers of this study observed the alcohol advertisement of 119 colleges that participated. They sampled over 10,000 students and 830 on-campus sites and 1684 off-campus sites. The results of the study showed that alcohol advertising such as specials and promotions especially on weekends were available and prevalent. Nearly three-quarters of the on campus grounds and about half of the grounds off campus had some type of beer advertising such as discount prices, coupons and even alcohol-related messages (e.g. health related messages). According to the CAS team, the frequent advertising of alcohol both on and off campuses is associated with increased alcohol consumption among college students such as binge drinking. "The lower average alcohol sale prices among on-premises establishments surrounding the college campus, the higher the college binge drinking rate".

Another study was completed by CASA at Columbia University on drinking rates among college students and the findings were that from 1993 to 2005, the rate of binge drinking had risen 16 percent. Furthermore, 26 percent of college students kept drinking until they were drunk. Alcohol companies spent over $1.2 billion on advertising and promotions and specials on college campuses across the United States in 1998 including special discounts, giveaways, print media, outdoor advertising, radio and television. Another two-thirds of a billion was spent on other forms of advertising for alcohol such as sponsorships, coupons and mailings. Alcohol advertising increased 34% from 1987 to 1996. Since 1997, alcohol advertising has been increasing on college campuses from students wearing alcohol-related appeal to coupons being offered via flyers for alcohol purchases on campus in the dining halls and off campus at liquor stores. Research from a study has shown that there is a direct correlation between increased alcohol advertising on college campuses and increased alcohol consumption among college students. Furthermore, the researchers of this study concluded that the lower the price of alcohol on or near college campuses, the higher the drinking rates among the students especially binge drinking. "This is consistent with previous findings that alcohol consumption by young people (in this case, college students) is affected by price. In line with this are the findings that alcohol promotions, price specials and large-volume discounts are associated with higher binge-drinking rates".

These days most of the underage drinking would occur after leaving secondary school and starting college. Apart from the deaths, Eamonn Molloy has found that in the United States, "Alcohol is implicated in approximately one hundred thousand sexual assaults and half a million injuries on college campuses annually" (2016:148).
