= Oliver C. Wiley =

American politician

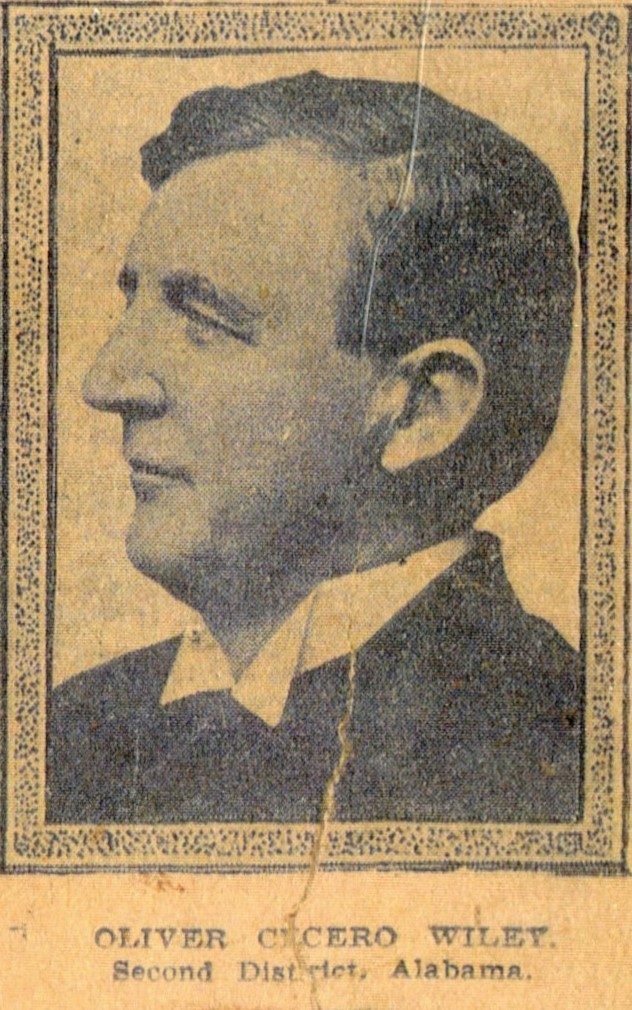

Member of the U.S. House of Representatives from Alabama's 2nd district
- In office November 3, 1908 – March 3, 1909
- Preceded by: Ariosto A. Wiley
- Succeeded by: S. Hubert Dent Jr.

Member of the Alabama House of Representatives
- In office 1884–1885; 1884–1889; 1896–1897

Personal details
- Born: Oliver Cicero Wiley; January 30, 1851 Troy, Alabama
- Died: October 18, 1917 (aged 66) Troy, Alabama
- Resting place: Oakwood Cemetery
- Party: Democratic
- Education: Bryant and Stratton Business College
- Profession: Businessman

Oliver Cicero Wiley (January 30, 1851 – October 18, 1917) was an American businessman, academic administrator, and politician who served briefly as a U.S. representative from Alabama from 1908 to 1909.

He was the brother of Ariosto Appling Wiley, whom Oliver succeeded in office.

== Early life and education ==
The youngest child of Cornelia Appling and James McCaleb Wiley, Oliver C. Wiley was born in Troy, Alabama in 1851. His father was a physician and lawyer who ascended to the position of circuit court judge. Oliver had four siblings, including his brother, Ariosto.

Oliver was educated at primary school in Troy, but the onset of the Civil War limited his options for higher education. He attended Bryant and Stratton’s business college in Nashville, Tennessee before joining a business partnership in a mercantile venture.

== Business career ==
He was one of four founding partners of Troy Fertilizer Company and served as its president. Early in the 20th century the company was acquired by Standard Chemical and Oil and Wiley was remained as an executive in the larger company.

He was instrumental in the founding of the Alabama Midland Railway, and from 1887 to 1892 served as its president. The railway ran a lucrative commercial line between Montgomery, Alabama and Bainbridge, Georgia. The first locomotive on the track was named in Wiley's honor. Years later, the railroad was involved in a legal dispute that went all the way to the U.S. Supreme Court. In its 1897 opinion, the court ruled in favor of the railroad in a case involving regulatory rate fees. The company was eventually merged into the larger Atlantic Coast Line in 1902.

== Political involvement ==
Wiley served as member of the Troy town council for five years. He also served as chairman of the Democratic executive committee of Pike County from 1884 to 1886. He served as member of the Democratic State executive committee in 1888.

=== Congress ===
Following the death of his brother Ariosto in 1908, Oliver Wiley was a candidate in the special election and was elected as a Democrat to the Sixtieth Congress to fill the vacancy. As part of the arrangement of his nomination, Oliver agreed to serve as a caretaker and not run for the seat in the next election. In all, Oliver Wiley served from November 3, 1908, to March 3, 1909.

Although he did not pass any legislation during his brief tenure, Wiley was an active legislator, introducing a number of bills and amendments. His topics of interest included the role of state governments is the debate on alcohol prohibition, postal rates for delivery of newspapers, and the pensions for veterans of the Spanish-American War.

As planned, Wiley did not seek re-election and the seat was won by Stanley Hubert Dent, Jr., who would serve in the seat until 1921.

== Later career and death ==
After his brief stint in Congress, Wiley served as president of the board of directors of the State normal college at Troy, Alabama. He served as director of the Farmers & Merchants' National Bank at Troy.

He died in Troy, Alabama, October 18, 1917 and was interred in Oakwood Cemetery.

== Family and activities ==
Wiley married Augusta Murphree on June 25, 1874. They had four children. Wiley was a Baptist and an active member of several civic organizations, including the Odd Fellows and Masonic Order. He was a lifelong temperance advocate.

U.S. House of Representatives
Preceded by Ariosto A. Wiley	Member of the U.S. House of Representatives from Alabama's 2nd congressional district November 3, 1908 – March 3, 1909	Succeeded by S. Hubert Dent Jr.
