= Charles Henderson (Alabama politician) =

American politician

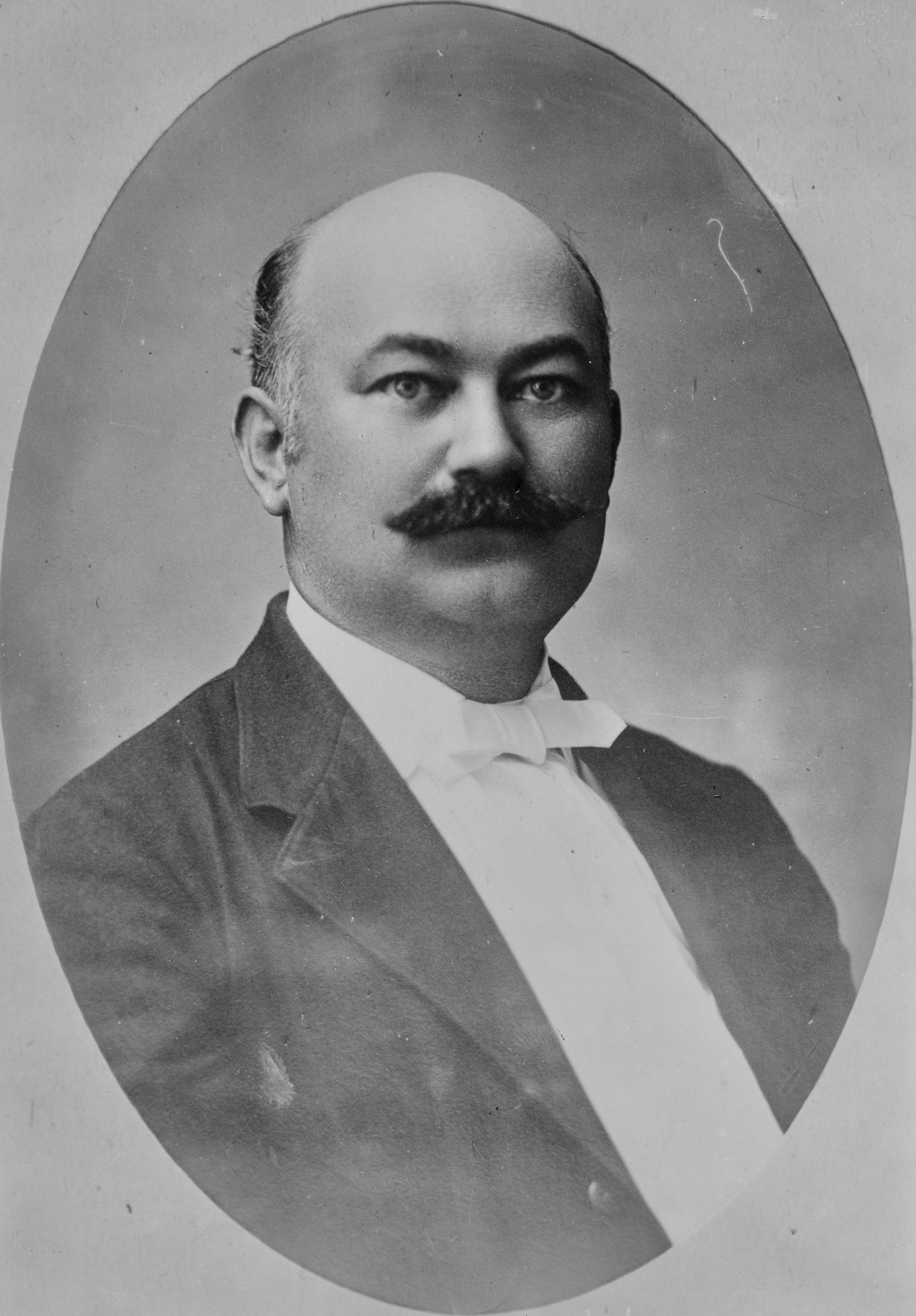
- Henderson in 1915

35th Governor of Alabama
- In office January 18, 1915 – January 20, 1919
- Lieutenant: Thomas Kilby
- Preceded by: Emmet O'Neal
- Succeeded by: Thomas Kilby

Personal details
- Born: April 26, 1860 Henderson, Alabama, US
- Died: January 7, 1937 (aged 76) Troy, Alabama, US
- Resting place: Oakwood Cemetery, Troy, Alabama, US
- Party: Democratic
- Spouse: Laura Montgomery Henderson

Charles Henderson (April 26, 1860 – January 7, 1937) was an American businessman serving as the 35th governor of Alabama from 1915 to 1919 and a member of the Democratic Party. Before serving as governor, Henderson was mayor of Troy, Alabama from 1886 to 1906 and played a role in Troy's business and civic development. After his term as governor, Henderson remained active in the community. In 1937, after a bout with influenza, Henderson suffered a stroke and died at age 76. The public high school and middle school in Troy bear his name.

== Early life ==
Charles Henderson was born on April 26, 1860, in Henderson, Alabama. Charles was the third son of Jeremiah Augustus "Gus" Henderson and Mildred Hill Henderson. Charles Henderson's keen business sense developed in childhood while helping out with his father's successful mercantile business in Troy. At age 15, Henderson enrolled in Howard College in Marion, Alabama. Two years later, his father died unexpectedly, and Henderson left school to help run the family business in Troy.

== Business and political leadership ==
After his return to Troy, Henderson quickly gained a reputation as a businessman and a community leader. In addition to helping with the family business, Henderson founded Troy's first wholesale grocery company, helped form the Alabama Midland Railroad Company, and owned a cotton-buying firm.

In 1886, Henderson made his first successful run for mayor at age 26, defeating James Folmar. During his terms as mayor, Henderson continued his involvement in Troy's business and community development:

In 1887, Henderson helped establish Troy State Normal School (now Troy University) to train teachers for Alabama public schools. While serving on the Normal School's board of directors, Henderson met his wife, Laura Montgomery Henderson, when she was hired to teach at the school.

In 1891, Henderson brought electricity to Troy. Henderson helped the city form an electric company, the Troy Utility Department, to produce and sell power. Laura Montgomery Henderson threw the switch at 8:10 pm on May 7, 1891.

In 1904, Henderson brought the telephone to Troy and southern Alabama by forming the Standard Telephone and Telegraph Company.

In 1906, Charles organized the Troy Bank and Trust Company with his brother Clem Henderson; both men also served on the Board of Directors of Farmers and Merchants National Bank of Troy.

In addition, Henderson served on the board of directors for the Standard Chemical and Oil Company, the Alabama Warehouse Company, and the Troy Compress Company. During this time, Henderson also served as Inspector General for Governor William Samford and aide-de-camp for Governor William Jelks.

Henderson resigned as mayor in 1906 after being appointed president of the Alabama Railroad Commission. He held this position until 1912.

== Governor ==
At age 54, Charles Henderson was elected Governor of Alabama. He was sworn into office on January 18, 1915. During his term, the state legislature passed a tax revision law, a primary election law, and a prohibition law. Henderson opposed prohibition and vetoed a law against alcohol advertising. Legislature ignored his veto and passed the law anyway; in 1915, the legislature went further and banned the sale of whiskey in Alabama. Henderson again vetoed this law and was overruled. Despite his disagreement with them, Henderson upheld and enforced both laws.

Henderson was instrumental in establishing a state child welfare department, a workmen's compensation program, and new health laws to control the spread of preventable diseases. He additionally helped improve the state prison system and adopted several educational reforms. Henderson's strong business sense influenced his years as governor, earning him the nickname "The Business Governor."

Charles Henderson left office on January 20, 1919. He never returned to politics, focusing instead on various business and community involvements, including serving as President of the Troy School Board and as a Trustee of Alabama Polytechnic Institute (now Auburn University).

== Philanthropy ==
Charles Henderson died in January 1937 after suffering a stroke. He and his wife had no children. Henderson left some of his considerable estate to family members, but most of his money was used to establish a perpetual trust to fund education and healthcare in Troy and Pike County. The fund, established through the Troy Bank & Trust Company, was to construct new schools in pike county and start a charity hospital for children in Troy. Money from Henderson's trust has been used to fund Charles Henderson High School, Charles Henderson Middle School, and The Charles Henderson Child Health Care Center.

== Other honors ==
- On May 1, 1943, the US liberty ship SS Charles Henderson was christened in New Orleans, Louisiana.
- On January 10, 1939, an armory in Troy was named Fort Charles Henderson. The armory's marker included an inscription that described Henderson as a "statesman, industrialist, and a philanthropist."
- Charles Henderson was inducted into the Alabama Business Hall of Fame in 1975.<ref>UA C&BA Alabama Business Hall of Fame
- Master Mason of Troy Lodge No. 56 of Free and Accepted Masons

Party political offices
Preceded by Emmet O'Neal	Democratic nominee for Governor of Alabama; 1914	Succeeded by Thomas Kilby
Political offices
Preceded by Emmet O'Neal	Governor of Alabama; 1915–1919	Succeeded by Thomas Kilby
