= Henry Wechsler =

Henry Wechsler was a lecturer at the Harvard T.H. Chan School of Public Health and was principal investigator of the College Alcohol Study. He died in November of 2021.

Wechsler is noted for his studies of drinking by college students and for popularizing the term “binge drinking” to refer to the consumption of four alcoholic drinks by a woman on an occasion and five alcoholic drinks by a man. Wechsler has brought attention to the large number of problems students who drink at this level produce for themselves, for others on campus, and for residents of neighborhoods where the colleges are located.

Wechsler has conducted several national surveys of college and university students across the United States and published extensively on the subject. His most recent book, is Dying to Drink: Confronting Binge Drinking on College Campuses.

He graduated from Washington & Jefferson College and Harvard University.
