= List of United States representatives in the 60th Congress =

This is a complete list of United States representatives during the 60th United States Congress listed by seniority.

As an historical article, the districts and party affiliations listed reflect those during the 60th Congress (March 4, 1907 – March 3, 1909). Seats and party affiliations on similar lists for other congresses will be different for certain members.

Seniority depends on the date on which members were sworn into office. Since many members are sworn in on the same day, subsequent ranking is based on previous congressional service of the individual and then by alphabetical order by the last name of the representative.

Committee chairmanship in the House is often associated with seniority. However, party leadership is typically not associated with seniority.

Note: The "*" indicates that the representative/delegate may have served one or more non-consecutive terms while in the House of Representatives of the United States Congress.

== U.S. House seniority list ==
U.S. House seniority
Rank	Representative	Party	District	Seniority date (Previous service, if any)	No.# of term(s)	Notes
1	Henry H. Bingham	R	PA-01	March 4, 1879	15th term	Dean of the House
2	John Dalzell	R	PA-30	March 4, 1887	11th term	
3	George W. Smith	R	IL-25	March 4, 1889	10th term	Died on November 30, 1907.
4	Sereno E. Payne	R	NY-31	December 2, 1889; Previous service, 1883–1887.	12th term*	
5	David A. De Armond	D	MO-06	March 4, 1891	9th term	
6	John A. T. Hull	R	IA-07	March 4, 1891	9th term	
7	William Atkinson Jones	D	VA-01	March 4, 1891	9th term	
8	Leonidas F. Livingston	D	GA-05	March 4, 1891	9th term	
9	Adolph Meyer	D	LA-01	March 4, 1891	9th term	Died on March 8, 1908.
10	Richard Bartholdt	R	MO-10	March 4, 1893	8th term	
11	Joseph Gurney Cannon	R	IL-18	March 4, 1893; Previous service, 1873–1891.	17th term*	Speaker of the House
12	Henry Allen Cooper	R	WI-01	March 4, 1893	8th term	
13	Robert G. Cousins	R	IA-05	March 4, 1893	8th term	Left the House in 1909.
14	John J. Gardner	R	NJ-02	March 4, 1893	8th term	
15	Frederick H. Gillett	R	MA-02	March 4, 1893	8th term	
16	William Peters Hepburn	R	IA-08	March 4, 1893; Previous service, 1881–1887.	11th term*	Left the House in 1909.
17	Henry C. Loudenslager	R	NJ-01	March 4, 1893	8th term	
18	Samuel W. McCall	R	MA-08	March 4, 1893	8th term	
19	James S. Sherman	R	NY-27	March 4, 1893; Previous service, 1887–1891.	10th term*	Left the House in 1909.
20	James Albertus Tawney	R	MN-01	March 4, 1893	8th term	
21	Irving Price Wanger	R	PA-07	March 4, 1893	8th term	
22	John Sharp Williams	D	MS-08	March 4, 1893	8th term	Left the House in 1909.
23	Ernest F. Acheson	R	PA-24	March 4, 1895	7th term	Left the House in 1909.
24	Charles Lafayette Bartlett	D	GA-06	March 4, 1895	7th term	
25	Theodore E. Burton	R	OH-21	March 4, 1895; Previous service, 1889–1891.	8th term*	Resigned on March 3, 1909.
26	George Edmund Foss	R	IL-10	March 4, 1895	7th term	
27	Charles N. Fowler	R	NJ-05	March 4, 1895	7th term	
28	Joseph V. Graff	R	IL-16	March 4, 1895	7th term	
29	E. Stevens Henry	R	CT-01	March 4, 1895	7th term	
30	Ebenezer J. Hill	R	CT-04	March 4, 1895	7th term	
31	Benjamin Franklin Howell	R	NJ-03	March 4, 1895	7th term	
32	John J. Jenkins	R	WI-11	March 4, 1895	7th term	Left the House in 1909.
33	Jesse Overstreet	R	IN-07	March 4, 1895	7th term	Left the House in 1909.
34	Richard W. Parker	R	NJ-07	March 4, 1895	7th term	
35	Stephen M. Sparkman	D	FL-01	March 4, 1895	7th term	
36	Nehemiah D. Sperry	R	CT-02	March 4, 1895	7th term	
37	Cyrus A. Sulloway	R	NH-01	March 4, 1895	7th term	
38	William Sulzer	D	NY-10	March 4, 1895	7th term	
39	George W. Prince	R	IL-15	December 2, 1895	7th term	
40	William C. Adamson	D	GA-04	March 4, 1897	6th term	
41	De Alva S. Alexander	R	NY-36	March 4, 1897	6th term	
42	William Gordon Brantley	D	GA-11	March 4, 1897	6th term	
43	Robert F. Broussard	D	LA-03	March 4, 1897	6th term	
44	Walter Brownlow	R	TN-01	March 4, 1897	6th term	
45	Stephen Brundidge, Jr.	D	AR-02	March 4, 1897	6th term	Left the House in 1909.
46	Thomas S. Butler	R	PA-08	March 4, 1897	6th term	
47	Adin B. Capron	R	RI-02	March 4, 1897	6th term	
48	Champ Clark	D	MO-09	March 4, 1897; Previous service, 1893–1895.	7th term*	
49	Henry De Lamar Clayton, Jr.	D	AL-03	March 4, 1897	6th term	
50	Edgar D. Crumpacker	R	IN-10	March 4, 1897	6th term	
51	Robert C. Davey	D	LA-02	March 4, 1897; Previous service, 1893–1895.	7th term*	Died on December 26, 1908.
52	James H. Davidson	R	WI-08	March 4, 1897	6th term	
53	John W. Gaines	D	TN-06	March 4, 1897	6th term	Left the House in 1909.
54	James M. Griggs	D	GA-02	March 4, 1897	6th term	
55	Edward L. Hamilton	R	MI-04	March 4, 1897	6th term	
56	James Hay	D	VA-07	March 4, 1897	6th term	
57	Robert Lee Henry	D	TX-11	March 4, 1897	6th term	
58	William Marcellus Howard	D	GA-08	March 4, 1897	6th term	
59	William Walton Kitchin	D	NC-05	March 4, 1897	6th term	Resigned on January 11, 1909.
60	John Lamb	D	VA-03	March 4, 1897	6th term	
61	Charles B. Landis	R	IN-09	March 4, 1897	6th term	Left the House in 1909.
62	Elijah B. Lewis	D	GA-03	March 4, 1897	6th term	Left the House in 1909.
63	William C. Lovering	R	MA-14	March 4, 1897	6th term	
64	James R. Mann	R	IL-02	March 4, 1897	6th term	
65	John A. Moon	D	TN-03	March 4, 1897	6th term	
66	Sydney Emanuel Mudd I	R	MD-05	March 4, 1897; Previous service, 1890–1891.	7th term*	
67	Marlin Edgar Olmsted	R	PA-18	March 4, 1897	6th term	
68	Thetus W. Sims	D	TN-08	March 4, 1897	6th term	
69	James Luther Slayden	D	TX-14	March 4, 1897	6th term	
70	Samuel William Smith	R	MI-06	March 4, 1897	6th term	
71	John Hall Stephens	D	TX-13	March 4, 1897	6th term	
72	Frederick Stevens	R	MN-04	March 4, 1897	6th term	
73	George W. Taylor	D	AL-01	March 4, 1897	6th term	
74	Oscar Underwood	D	AL-09	March 4, 1897; Previous service, 1895–1896.	7th term*	
75	James Tilghman Lloyd	D	MO-01	June 1, 1897	6th term	
76	Edwin C. Burleigh	R	ME-03	June 21, 1897	6th term	
77	George P. Lawrence	R	MA-01	November 2, 1897	6th term	
78	Henry Sherman Boutell	R	IL-09	November 23, 1897	6th term	
79	William S. Greene	R	MA-13	May 31, 1898	6th term	
80	Thomas Spight	D	MS-02	July 5, 1898	6th term	
81	Frank A. McLain	D	MS-07	December 12, 1898	6th term	Left the House in 1909.
82	Abraham L. Brick	R	IN-13	March 4, 1899	5th term	Died on April 7, 1908.
83	Albert S. Burleson	D	TX-10	March 4, 1899	5th term	
84	John L. Burnett	D	AL-07	March 4, 1899	5th term	
85	William A. Calderhead	R	KS-05	March 4, 1899; Previous service, 1895–1897.	6th term*	
86	Francis W. Cushman	R	WA	March 4, 1899	5th term	
87	Michael E. Driscoll	R	NY-29	March 4, 1899	5th term	
88	John J. Esch	R	WI-07	March 4, 1899	5th term	
89	David E. Finley	D	SC-05	March 4, 1899	5th term	
90	John J. Fitzgerald	D	NY-07	March 4, 1899	5th term	
91	Joseph W. Fordney	R	MI-08	March 4, 1899	5th term	
92	Washington Gardner	R	MI-03	March 4, 1899	5th term	
93	Gilbert N. Haugen	R	IA-04	March 4, 1899	5th term	
94	Wesley Livsey Jones	R	WA	March 4, 1899	5th term	Left the House in 1909.
95	James Monroe Miller	R	KS-04	March 4, 1899	5th term	
96	Franklin Wheeler Mondell	R	WY	March 4, 1899; Previous service, 1895–1897.	6th term*	
97	James C. Needham	R	CA-06	March 4, 1899	5th term	
98	George Alexander Pearre	R	MD-06	March 4, 1899	5th term	
99	William Augustus Reeder	R	KS-06	March 4, 1899	5th term	
100	Ernest W. Roberts	R	MA-07	March 4, 1899	5th term	
101	William W. Rucker	D	MO-02	March 4, 1899	5th term	
102	William H. Ryan	D	NY-35	March 4, 1899	5th term	Left the House in 1909.
103	John Humphrey Small	D	NC-01	March 4, 1899	5th term	
104	Charles R. Thomas	D	NC-03	March 4, 1899	5th term	
105	James Eli Watson	R	IN-06	March 4, 1899; Previous service, 1895–1897.	6th term*	Left the House in 1909.
106	Charles E. Littlefield	R	ME-02	June 19, 1899	5th term	Resigned on September 30, 1908.
107	Joseph E. Ransdell	D	LA-05	August 29, 1899	5th term	
108	Dorsey W. Shackleford	D	MO-08	August 29, 1899	5th term	
109	Amos L. Allen	R	ME-01	November 6, 1899	5th term	
110	Edward B. Vreeland	R	NY-37	November 7, 1899	5th term	
111	William N. Richardson	D	AL-08	August 6, 1900	5th term	
112	Walter I. Smith	R	IA-09	December 3, 1900	5th term	
113	James Perry Conner	R	IA-10	December 4, 1900	5th term	Left the House in 1909.
114	Arthur Laban Bates	R	PA-25	March 4, 1901	4th term	
115	George Farmer Burgess	D	TX-09	March 4, 1901	4th term	
116	Ezekiel S. Candler, Jr.	D	MS-01	March 4, 1901	4th term	
117	Frank Dunklee Currier	R	NH-02	March 4, 1901	4th term	Left the House in 1909.
118	Archibald B. Darragh	R	MI-11	March 4, 1901	4th term	
119	William Henry Draper	R	NY-22	March 4, 1901	4th term	
120	Henry D. Flood	D	VA-10	March 4, 1901	4th term	
121	David J. Foster	R	VT-01	March 4, 1901	4th term	
122	Joseph H. Gaines	R	WV-03	March 4, 1901	4th term	
123	Henry M. Goldfogle	D	NY-09	March 4, 1901	4th term	
124	Kittredge Haskins	R	VT-02	March 4, 1901	4th term	Left the House in 1909.
125	Elias S. Holliday	R	IN-05	March 4, 1901	4th term	Left the House in 1909.
126	James A. Hughes	R	WV-05	March 4, 1901	4th term	
127	Joseph T. Johnson	D	SC-04	March 4, 1901	4th term	
128	Claude Kitchin	D	NC-02	March 4, 1901	4th term	
129	George H. Lindsay	D	NY-02	March 4, 1901	4th term	
130	Thomas Frank Marshall	R	ND	March 4, 1901	4th term	Left the House in 1909.
131	Harry L. Maynard	D	VA-02	March 4, 1901	4th term	
132	James McLachlan	R	CA-07	March 4, 1901; Previous service, 1895–1897.	5th term*	
133	Lemuel P. Padgett	D	TN-07	March 4, 1901	4th term	
134	James Breck Perkins	R	NY-32	March 4, 1901	4th term	
135	Edward W. Pou	D	NC-04	March 4, 1901	4th term	
136	Choice B. Randell	D	TX-04	March 4, 1901	4th term	
137	Charles C. Reid	D	AR-05	March 4, 1901	4th term	
138	Charles Frederick Scott	R	KS-02	March 4, 1901	4th term	
139	George N. Southwick	R	NY-23	March 4, 1901; Previous service, 1895–1899.	6th term*	
140	Charles Q. Tirrell	R	MA-04	March 4, 1901	4th term	
141	Ariosto A. Wiley	D	AL-02	March 4, 1901	4th term	Died on June 17, 1908.
142	Llewellyn Powers	R	ME-04	April 8, 1901; Previous service, 1877–1879.	5th term*	Died on July 28, 1908.
143	Henry B. Cassel	R	PA-09	November 5, 1901	4th term	Left the House in 1909.
144	Charles L. Knapp	R	NY-28	November 5, 1901	4th term	
145	Asbury Francis Lever	D	SC-07	November 5, 1901	4th term	
146	John Wilbur Dwight	R	NY-30	November 4, 1902	4th term	
147	Augustus Peabody Gardner	R	MA-06	November 4, 1902	4th term	
148	Carter Glass	D	VA-06	November 4, 1902	4th term	
149	Gordon J. Russell	D	TX-03	November 4, 1902	4th term	
150	Morris Sheppard	D	TX-01	November 15, 1902	4th term	
151	Wyatt Aiken	D	SC-03	March 4, 1903	3rd term	
152	Butler Ames	R	MA-05	March 4, 1903	3rd term	
153	James Andrew Beall	D	TX-05	March 4, 1903	3rd term	
154	James Bede	R	MN-08	March 4, 1903	3rd term	Left the House in 1909.
155	Benjamin P. Birdsall	R	IA-03	March 4, 1903	3rd term	Left the House in 1909.
156	Eaton J. Bowers	D	MS-06	March 4, 1903	3rd term	
157	Thomas W. Bradley	R	NY-20	March 4, 1903	3rd term	
158	Adam M. Byrd	D	MS-05	March 4, 1903	3rd term	
159	Philip P. Campbell	R	KS-03	March 4, 1903	3rd term	
160	Allen Foster Cooper	R	PA-23	March 4, 1903	3rd term	
161	Charles Russell Davis	R	MN-03	March 4, 1903	3rd term	
162	Charles T. Dunwell	R	NY-03	March 4, 1903	3rd term	Died on June 12, 1908.
163	Burton L. French	R	ID	March 4, 1903	3rd term	Left the House in 1909.
164	Charles Eugene Fuller	R	IL-12	March 4, 1903	3rd term	
165	John Nance Garner	D	TX-15	March 4, 1903	3rd term	
166	Oscar W. Gillespie	D	TX-12	March 4, 1903	3rd term	
167	Herman P. Goebel	R	OH-02	March 4, 1903	3rd term	
168	Joseph A. Goulden	D	NY-18	March 4, 1903	3rd term	
169	Daniel L. D. Granger	D	RI-01	March 4, 1903	3rd term	Died on February 14, 1909.
170	Alexander W. Gregg	D	TX-07	March 4, 1903	3rd term	
171	Thomas W. Hardwick	D	GA-10	March 4, 1903	3rd term	
172	Wilson S. Hill	D	MS-04	March 4, 1903	3rd term	Left the House in 1909.
173	Edmund H. Hinshaw	R	NE-04	March 4, 1903	3rd term	
174	Joseph Howell	R	UT	March 4, 1903	3rd term	
175	George Franklin Huff	R	PA-22	March 4, 1903; Previous service, 1891–1893 and 1895–1897.	5th term**	
176	William E. Humphrey	R	WA	March 4, 1903	3rd term	
177	Benjamin G. Humphreys II	D	MS-03	March 4, 1903	3rd term	
178	Ollie Murray James	D	KY-01	March 4, 1903	3rd term	
179	John A. Keliher	D	MA-09	March 4, 1903	3rd term	
180	James Kennedy	R	OH-18	March 4, 1903	3rd term	
181	Moses Kinkaid	R	NE-06	March 4, 1903	3rd term	
182	Philip Knopf	R	IL-07	March 4, 1903	3rd term	Left the House in 1909.
183	William Bailey Lamar	D	FL-03	March 4, 1903	3rd term	Left the House in 1909.
184	Daniel F. Lafean	R	PA-20	March 4, 1903	3rd term	
185	George Swinton Legaré	D	SC-01	March 4, 1903	3rd term	
186	George L. Lilley	R	CT	March 4, 1903	3rd term	Resigned on January 5, 1909.
187	Nicholas Longworth	R	OH-01	March 4, 1903	3rd term	
188	William Lorimer	R	IL-06	March 4, 1903; Previous service, 1895–1901.	6th term*	
189	George A. Loud	R	MI-10	March 4, 1903	3rd term	
190	Robert B. Macon	D	AR-01	March 4, 1903	3rd term	
191	George Deardorff McCreary	R	PA-06	March 4, 1903	3rd term	
192	Henry McMorran	R	MI-07	March 4, 1903	3rd term	
193	George W. Norris	R	NE-05	March 4, 1903	3rd term	
194	Robert N. Page	D	NC-07	March 4, 1903	3rd term	
195	Arsène Pujo	D	LA-07	March 4, 1903	3rd term	
196	Henry Thomas Rainey	D	IL-20	March 4, 1903	3rd term	
197	Joseph Taylor Robinson	D	AR-06	March 4, 1903	3rd term	
198	William A. Rodenberg	R	IL-22	March 4, 1903; Previous service, 1899–1901.	4th term*	
199	J. Swagar Sherley	D	KY-05	March 4, 1903	3rd term	
200	Campbell Slemp	R	VA-09	March 4, 1903	3rd term	Died on October 13, 1907.
201	William Robert Smith	D	TX-16	March 4, 1903	3rd term	
202	Howard M. Snapp	R	IL-11	March 4, 1903	3rd term	
203	William H. Stafford	R	WI-05	March 4, 1903	3rd term	
204	Augustus Owsley Stanley	D	KY-02	March 4, 1903	3rd term	
205	Halvor Steenerson	R	MN-09	March 4, 1903	3rd term	
206	John Allen Sterling	R	IL-17	March 4, 1903	3rd term	
207	Joshua Frederick Cockey Talbott	D	MD-02	March 4, 1903; Previous service, 1879–1885 and 1893–1895.	6th term**	
208	Charles E. Townsend	R	MI-02	March 4, 1903	3rd term	
209	Andrew Volstead	R	MN-07	March 4, 1903	3rd term	
210	Robert M. Wallace	D	AR-07	March 4, 1903	3rd term	
211	Edwin Y. Webb	D	NC-09	March 4, 1903	3rd term	
212	Charles H. Weisse	D	WI-06	March 4, 1903	3rd term	
213	William Warfield Wilson	R	IL-03	March 4, 1903	3rd term	
214	Harry C. Woodyard	R	WV-04	March 4, 1903	3rd term	
215	H. Olin Young	R	MI-12	March 4, 1903	3rd term	
216	Victor Murdock	R	KS-08	May 26, 1903	3rd term	
217	Reuben Moon	R	PA-04	November 3, 1903	3rd term	
218	Capell L. Weems	R	OH-16	November 3, 1903	3rd term	Left the House in 1909.
219	Robert W. Bonynge	R	CO-01	February 16, 1904	3rd term	Left the House in 1909.
220	William Bourke Cockran	D	NY-12	February 23, 1904; Previous service, 1887–1889 and 1891–1895.	6th term**	Left the House in 1909.
221	James Thomas Heflin	D	AL-05	May 19, 1904	3rd term	
222	Joseph R. Knowland	R	CA-03	November 8, 1904	3rd term	
223	W. Aubrey Thomas	R	OH-19	November 8, 1904	3rd term	
224	Ira W. Wood	R	NJ-04	November 8, 1904	3rd term	
225	John Emory Andrus	R	NY-19	March 4, 1905	2nd term	
226	Henry T. Bannon	R	OH-10	March 4, 1905	2nd term	Left the House in 1909.
227	Andrew Jackson Barchfeld	R	PA-32	March 4, 1905	2nd term	
228	Thomas Montgomery Bell	D	GA-09	March 4, 1905	2nd term	
229	Joseph B. Bennett	R	KY-09	March 4, 1905	2nd term	
230	William Stiles Bennet	R	NY-17	March 4, 1905	2nd term	
231	James F. Burke	R	PA-31	March 4, 1905	2nd term	
232	Hiram R. Burton	R	DE	March 4, 1905	2nd term	Left the House in 1909.
233	William M. Calder	R	NY-06	March 4, 1905	2nd term	
234	John C. Chaney	R	IN-02	March 4, 1905	2nd term	Left the House in 1909.
235	Pleasant T. Chapman	R	IL-24	March 4, 1905	2nd term	
236	Frank Clark	D	FL-02	March 4, 1905	2nd term	
237	William W. Cocks	R	NY-01	March 4, 1905	2nd term	
238	Ralph D. Cole	R	OH-08	March 4, 1905	2nd term	
239	Beman Gates Dawes	R	OH-15	March 4, 1905	2nd term	Left the House in 1909.
240	Albert F. Dawson	R	IA-02	March 4, 1905	2nd term	
241	Edwin Denby	R	MI-01	March 4, 1905	2nd term	
242	Lincoln Dixon	D	IN-04	March 4, 1905	2nd term	
243	Don C. Edwards	R	KY-11	March 4, 1905	2nd term	
244	J. Edwin Ellerbe	D	SC-06	March 4, 1905	2nd term	
245	Edgar C. Ellis	R	MO-05	March 4, 1905	2nd term	Left the House in 1909.
246	Jacob Sloat Fassett	R	NY-33	March 4, 1905	2nd term	
247	John C. Floyd	D	AR-03	March 4, 1905	2nd term	
248	Finis J. Garrett	D	TN-09	March 4, 1905	2nd term	
249	John Gill, Jr.	D	MD-04	March 4, 1905	2nd term	
250	William Harrison Graham	R	PA-29	March 4, 1905; Previous service, 1898–1903.	5th term*	
251	Asle Gronna	R	ND	March 4, 1905	2nd term	
252	Nathan W. Hale	R	TN-02	March 4, 1905	2nd term	Left the House in 1909.
253	Everis A. Hayes	R	CA-05	March 4, 1905	2nd term	
254	William C. Houston	D	TN-05	March 4, 1905	2nd term	
255	Elbert H. Hubbard	R	IA-11	March 4, 1905	2nd term	
256	Julius Kahn	R	CA-04	March 4, 1905; Previous service, 1899–1903.	4th term*	
257	J. Warren Keifer	R	OH-07	March 4, 1905; Previous service, 1877–1885.	6th term*	
258	Charles B. Law	R	NY-04	March 4, 1905	2nd term	
259	Gordon Lee	D	GA-07	March 4, 1905	2nd term	
260	Martin B. Madden	R	IL-01	March 4, 1905	2nd term	
261	Charles McGavin	R	IL-08	March 4, 1905	2nd term	Left the House in 1909.
262	Duncan E. McKinlay	R	CA-02	March 4, 1905	2nd term	
263	William B. McKinley	R	IL-19	March 4, 1905	2nd term	
264	John M. Moore	D	TX-08	March 4, 1905	2nd term	
265	Grant E. Mouser	R	OH-13	March 4, 1905	2nd term	Left the House in 1909.
266	J. Van Vechten Olcott	R	NY-15	March 4, 1905	2nd term	
267	Herbert Parsons	R	NY-13	March 4, 1905	2nd term	
268	James O'H. Patterson	D	SC-02	March 4, 1905	2nd term	
269	John Merriman Reynolds	R	PA-19	March 4, 1905	2nd term	
270	Joseph L. Rhinock	D	KY-06	March 4, 1905	2nd term	
271	Sylvester C. Smith	R	CA-08	March 4, 1905	2nd term	
272	Edward L. Taylor, Jr.	R	OH-12	March 4, 1905	2nd term	
273	George E. Waldo	R	NY-05	March 4, 1905	2nd term	Left the House in 1909.
274	John T. Watkins	D	LA-04	March 4, 1905	2nd term	
275	John W. Weeks	R	MA-12	March 4, 1905	2nd term	
276	John H. Foster	R	IN-01	May 16, 1905	2nd term	Left the House in 1909.
277	Ernest M. Pollard	R	NE-01	July 18, 1905	2nd term	Left the House in 1909.
278	Edwin W. Higgins	R	CT-03	October 2, 1905	2nd term	
279	James McKinney	R	IL-14	November 7, 1905	2nd term	
280	Harry M. Coudrey	R	MO-12	June 23, 1906	2nd term	
281	John M. Nelson	R	WI-02	September 4, 1906	2nd term	
282	Charles N. Brumm	R	PA-12	November 6, 1906; Previous service, 1881–1889 and 1895–1899.	8th term**	Resigned on January 4, 1909.
283	William F. Englebright	R	CA-01	November 6, 1906	2nd term	
284	Clarence C. Gilhams	R	IN-12	November 6, 1906	2nd term	Left the House in 1909.
285	Frank Orren Lowden	R	IL-13	November 6, 1906	2nd term	
286	J. Hampton Moore	R	PA-03	November 6, 1906	2nd term	
287	John E. Reyburn	R	PA-02	November 6, 1906; Previous service, 1890–1897.	6th term*	Resigned on March 31, 1907.
288	Daniel J. Riordan	D	NY-08	November 6, 1906; Previous service, 1899–1901.	3rd term*	
289	Edward W. Saunders	D	VA-05	November 6, 1906	2nd term	
290	Charles G. Washburn	R	MA-03	December 18, 1906	2nd term	
291	John A. M. Adair	D	IN-08	March 4, 1907	1st term	
292	Joshua W. Alexander	D	MO-03	March 4, 1907	1st term	
293	Timothy T. Ansberry	D	OH-05	March 4, 1907	1st term	
294	William A. Ashbrook	D	OH-17	March 4, 1907	1st term	
295	Charles Frederick Barclay	R	PA-21	March 4, 1907	1st term	
296	George A. Bartlett	D	NV	March 4, 1907	1st term	
297	Joseph Grant Beale	R	PA-27	March 4, 1907	1st term	Left the House in 1909.
298	Jefferson Davis Brodhead	D	PA-26	March 4, 1907	1st term	Left the House in 1909.
299	Charles F. Booher	D	MO-04	March 4, 1907; Previous service, 1889.	2nd term*	
300	John Frank Boyd	R	NE-03	March 4, 1907	1st term	Left the House in 1909.
301	Ben F. Caldwell	D	IL-21	March 4, 1907; Previous service, 1899–1905.	4th term*	Left the House in 1909.
302	William J. Cary	R	WI-04	March 4, 1907	1st term	
303	Henry S. Caulfield	R	MO-11	March 4, 1907	1st term	Left the House in 1909.
304	George W. Cook	R	CO	March 4, 1907	1st term	Left the House in 1909.
305	Samuel B. Cooper	D	TX-02	March 4, 1907; Previous service, 1893–1905.	7th term*	Left the House in 1909.
306	William E. Cox	D	IN-03	March 4, 1907	1st term	
307	William Benjamin Craig	D	AL-04	March 4, 1907	1st term	
308	William B. Cravens	D	AR-04	March 4, 1907	1st term	
309	William T. Crawford	D	NC-10	March 4, 1907; Previous service, 1891–1895 and 1899–1900.	4th term**	Left the House in 1909.
310	Matthew Denver	D	OH-06	March 4, 1907	1st term	
311	Albert Douglas	R	OH-11	March 4, 1907	1st term	
312	Cyrus Durey	R	NY-25	March 4, 1907	1st term	
313	Charles Gordon Edwards	D	GA-01	March 4, 1907	1st term	
314	William R. Ellis	R	OR-02	March 4, 1907; Previous service, 1893–1899.	4th term*	
315	George Winthrop Fairchild	R	NY-24	March 4, 1907	1st term	
316	George K. Favrot	D	LA-06	March 4, 1907	1st term	Left the House in 1909.
317	Benjamin K. Focht	R	PA-17	March 4, 1907	1st term	
318	Charles V. Fornes	D	NY-11	March 4, 1907	1st term	
319	Martin D. Foster	D	IL-23	March 4, 1907	1st term	
320	William Walker Foulkrod	R	PA-05	March 4, 1907	1st term	
321	Hannibal Lafayette Godwin	D	NC-06	March 4, 1907	1st term	
322	George W. Gordon	D	TN-10	March 4, 1907	1st term	
323	Philo Hall	R	SD	March 4, 1907	1st term	Left the House in 1909.
324	Willis C. Hawley	R	OR-01	March 4, 1907	1st term	
325	L. Paul Howland	R	OH-20	March 4, 1907	1st term	
326	Richard N. Hackett	D	NC-08	March 4, 1907	1st term	Left the House in 1909.
327	Thomas Hackney	D	MO-15	March 4, 1907	1st term	Left the House in 1909.
328	Warren A. Haggott	R	CO-02	March 4, 1907	1st term	Left the House in 1909.
329	James A. Hamill	D	NJ-10	March 4, 1907	1st term	
330	Courtney W. Hamlin	D	MO-07	March 4, 1907; Previous service, 1903–1905.	2nd term*	
331	Daniel W. Hamilton	D	IA-06	March 4, 1907	1st term	Left the House in 1909.
332	Winfield Scott Hammond	D	MN-02	March 4, 1907	1st term	
333	J. Eugene Harding	R	OH-03	March 4, 1907	1st term	Left the House in 1909.
334	Rufus Hardy	D	TX-06	March 4, 1907	1st term	
335	Francis Burton Harrison	D	NY-16	March 4, 1907; Previous service, 1903–1905.	2nd term*	
336	Harvey Helm	D	KY-08	March 4, 1907	1st term	
337	Gilbert Hitchcock	D	NE-02	March 4, 1907; Previous service, 1903–1905.	2nd term*	
338	Richmond P. Hobson	D	AL-06	March 4, 1907	1st term	
339	William Pallister Hubbard	R	WV-01	March 4, 1907	1st term	
340	William Hughes	D	NJ-06	March 4, 1907; Previous service, 1903–1905.	2nd term*	
341	Cordell Hull	D	TN-04	March 4, 1907	1st term	
342	William Humphreys Jackson	D	MD-01	March 4, 1907; Previous service, 1901–1905.	2nd term*	Left the House in 1909.
343	Addison James	R	KY-03	March 4, 1907	1st term	Left the House in 1909.
344	Ben Johnson	D	KY-04	March 4, 1907	1st term	
345	Charles A. Kennedy	R	IA-01	March 4, 1907	1st term	
346	George Washington Kipp	D	PA-14	March 4, 1907	1st term	Left the House in 1909.
347	Gustav Küstermann	R	WI-09	March 4, 1907	1st term	
348	William P. Kimball	D	KY-07	March 4, 1907	1st term	Left the House in 1909.
349	J. Robert Lamar	D	MO-16	March 4, 1907; Previous service, 1903–1905.	2nd term*	Left the House in 1909.
350	J. Ford Laning	R	OH-14	March 4, 1907	1st term	Left the House in 1909.
351	John W. Langley	R	KY-10	March 4, 1907	1st term	
352	Francis R. Lassiter	D	VA-04	March 4, 1907; Previous service, 1900–1903.	3rd term*	
353	Eugene W. Leake	D	NJ-09	March 4, 1907	1st term	Left the House in 1909.
354	Charles August Lindbergh	R	MN-06	March 4, 1907	1st term	
355	John Thomas Lenahan	D	PA-11	March 4, 1907	1st term	Left the House in 1909.
356	Edmond H. Madison	R	KS-07	March 4, 1907	1st term	
357	George R. Malby	R	NY-26	March 4, 1907	1st term	
358	James T. McDermott	D	IL-04	March 4, 1907	1st term	
359	John Geiser McHenry	D	PA-16	March 4, 1907	1st term	
360	James C. McLaughlin	R	MI-09	March 4, 1907	1st term	
361	Samuel McMillan	R	NY-21	March 4, 1907	1st term	Left the House in 1909.
362	Elmer A. Morse	R	WI-10	March 4, 1907	1st term	
363	James William Murphy	D	WI-03	March 4, 1907	1st term	Left the House in 1909.
364	Thomas David Nicholls	D	PA-10	March 4, 1907	1st term	
365	Frank Nye	R	MN-05	March 4, 1907	1st term	
366	Joseph F. O'Connell	D	MA-10	March 4, 1907	1st term	
367	William H. Parker	R	SD	March 4, 1907	1st term	Died on June 26, 1908.
368	Andrew James Peters	D	MA-11	March 4, 1907	1st term	
369	Peter A. Porter	R	NY-34	March 4, 1907	1st term	Left the House in 1909.
370	Le Gage Pratt	D	NJ-08	March 4, 1907	1st term	Left the House in 1909.
371	Charles Nelson Pray	R	MT	March 4, 1907	1st term	
372	George W. Rauch	D	IN-11	March 4, 1907	1st term	
373	John Hoover Rothermel	D	PA-13	March 4, 1907	1st term	
374	Joseph J. Russell	D	MO-14	March 4, 1907	1st term	Left the House in 1909.
375	Adolph J. Sabath	D	IL-05	March 4, 1907	1st term	
376	Isaac R. Sherwood	D	OH-09	March 4, 1907; Previous service, 1873–1875.	2nd term*	
377	Madison Roswell Smith	D	MO-13	March 4, 1907	1st term	Left the House in 1909.
378	George Cookman Sturgiss	R	WV-02	March 4, 1907	1st term	
379	William E. Tou Velle	D	OH-04	March 4, 1907	1st term	
380	William Willett, Jr.	D	NY-14	March 4, 1907	1st term	
381	Nelson Platt Wheeler	R	PA-28	March 4, 1907	1st term	
382	William Bauchop Wilson	D	PA-15	March 4, 1907	1st term	
383	Harry Benjamin Wolf	D	MD-03	March 4, 1907	1st term	Left the House in 1909.
	Gerrit J. Diekema	R	MI-05	April 27, 1907	1st term	
	Daniel Read Anthony, Jr.	R	KS-01	May 23, 1907	1st term	
	Charles Creighton Carlin	D	VA-08	November 5, 1907	1st term	
	Joel Cook	R	PA-02	November 5, 1907	1st term	
	Charles D. Carter	D	OK-04	November 16, 1907	1st term	
	James S. Davenport	D	OK-03	November 16, 1907	1st term	Left the House in 1909.
	Scott Ferris	D	OK-05	November 16, 1907	1st term	
	Elmer L. Fulton	D	OK-02	November 16, 1907	1st term	Left the House in 1909.
	Bird Segle McGuire	R	OK-01	November 16, 1907; Previous service, 1903–1907.	3rd term*	
	C. Bascom Slemp	R	VA-09	December 17, 1907	1st term	
	Napoleon B. Thistlewood	R	IL-25	February 15, 1908	1st term	
	Henry A. Barnhart	D	IN-13	November 3, 1908	1st term	
	Albert Estopinal	D	LA-01	November 3, 1908	1st term	
	Otto G. Foelker	R	NY-03	November 3, 1908	1st term	
	Frank E. Guernsey	D	ME-04	November 3, 1908	1st term	
	Eben Martin	R	SD	November 3, 1908; Previous service, 1901–1907.	4th term*	
	John P. Swasey	R	ME-02	November 3, 1908	1st term	
	Oliver C. Wiley	D	AL-02	November 3, 1908	1st term	Left the House in 1909.

== Delegates ==
Rank	Delegate	Party	District	Seniority date (Previous service, if any)	No.# of term(s)	Notes
1	Jonah Kūhiō Kalanianaʻole	R	HI	March 4, 1903	3rd term	
2	William Henry Andrews	R	NM	March 4, 1905	2nd term	
3	Tulio Larrínaga		PR	March 4, 1905	2nd term	
4	Marcus A. Smith	D	AZ	March 4, 1905; Previous service, 1887–1895, 1897–1899 and 1901–1903.	8th term***	
5	Thomas Cale	Independent	AK	March 4, 1907	1st term	
6	Benito Legarda		PHL	November 22, 1907	1st term	
7	Pablo Ocampo		PHL	November 22, 1907	1st term	

== See also ==
- 60th United States Congress
- List of United States congressional districts
- List of United States senators in the 60th Congress
