= Charles "Buffalo" Jones =

American frontiersman (1844–1919)

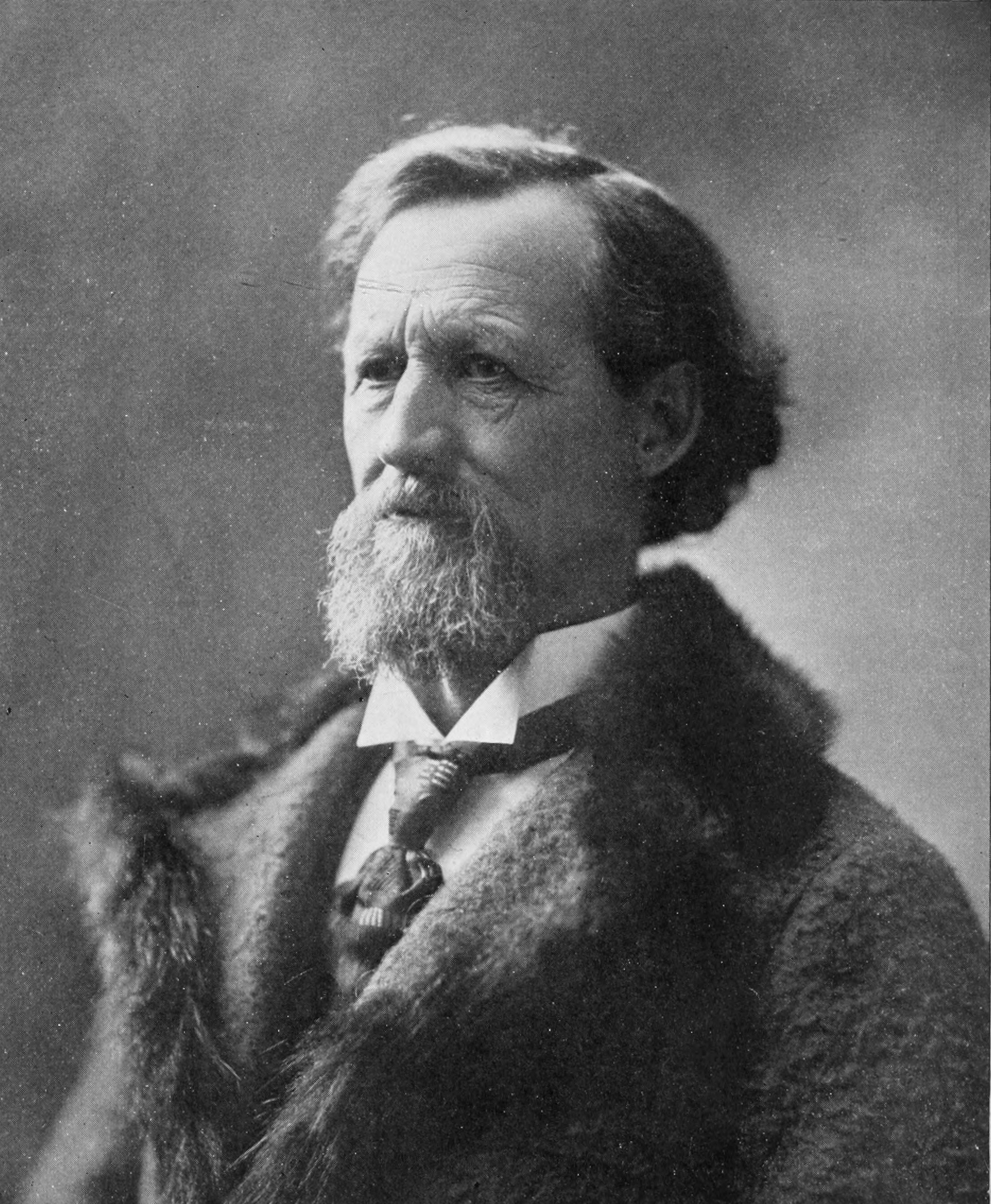
Charles Jesse Jones

Charles Jesse Jones, known as "Buffalo Jones" (January 31, 1844 – October 1, 1919), was an American frontiersman, farmer, rancher, hunter, conservationist, and politician. He cofounded Garden City, Kansas. He has been cited by the National Archives as one of the "preservers of the American bison".

He was the first game warden of Yellowstone National Park.

== Life ==
Jones was born January 31, 1844, in McLean County, Illinois, the second son out of 12 children. Jones developed an early interest in wild animals. Schooling for Jones was limited; he could only attend two or three days out of the week or when the weather was too cold. Jones attended Wesleyan University (now called Illinois Wesleyan University) in Bloomington, Illinois when he was 21. He left due to eye problems caused by typhoid fever. In 1866, at the age of 21, he moved to Troy, in northeast Kansas with little more than a sack of Osage orange seeds brought from Illinois.

Jones found success due to the demand for Osage orange wood in Kansas due to its versatility as a material in the manufacture of livestock pens and fences. Jones found a partner, George Baker, and began a nursery. Also around this time, Jones married his wife Martha Walton. Attracted by the lucrative trade of buffalo hunting in the Great Plains region (see “Western Enterprise,” P. 24), Jones joined the buckskin-clad cavalcade and became a frontiersman and hide harvester. He became known as “Buffalo Jones”, which he would claim was due to his achievement of having killed more buffalo than any other man, though the claim had no substantial proof. Eventually Jones quit hunting and dedicated his efforts to the preservation of the bison.

Jones and his wife homesteaded 160 acres in Sequoyah (later Finney) County, Kansas, where Jones helped found Garden City. He lobbied successfully both to bring the Atchison, Topeka and Santa Fe Railroad through town and to have Garden named the county seat. He donated land for a courthouse and commercial block and served as Garden City's first mayor.

By the mid-1880s, the buffalo trade sharply wound down due to dwindling bison populations across the region. Jones recognized the environmental damage the buffalo trade caused and the imminent danger that buffalo might vanish entirely. Jones began collecting buffalo to protect them. The continent's single massive bison herd was split in two upon construction of the first continental railroad, a northern herd and a smaller southern herd. First, he gathered what straggling remnants he could find on the Great Plains, particularly calves. He captured 14 calves in 1886.

Through letters, telegrams and travel he sought any specimens alive on the continent. An alliance with pioneer Texas rancher Charles Goodnight, who'd been following a similar notion, yielded success in gathering more, as did purchases from Montana rancher Charles Allard. Jones also gathered 83 head of bison from Manitoba against the wishes of the Canadian government.

Jones launched a buffalo breeding business after surveying thousands of frozen range cattle that perished in the January 1886 blizzard. Jones figured by breeding cattle with the hardy buffalo he could produce a stock able to survive the high plains, yet gentle enough to herd and brand. He captured a number of calves and brought them back to his Garden City ranch where he bred them with cattle. This early experiment with "cattalo," the name Jones used to advertise the new animal, failed because the species could not reproduce. In addition, it seemed the animals lost none of the spirited buffalo temperament. He also developed the “seal cow” (buffalo crossed with short-horned Scottish Galloway cattle). The latter's fine, lustrous hair resembled the seal fur fashionable in the era. These hybrids mainly were treated like any other livestock. Cattalo robes were thicker and more uniform than the purebred bison's, and their meat was delicious. Seal cows’ pelts substituted for those of Arctic fur seals, another animal close to extinction.

Jones served two terms in the Kansas House of Representatives as a Republican, first in the 1885–1886 session, then in the 1889 session, having lost a contested election to Howell P. Myton in 1886. In 1890, he sought the Republican nomination to succeed Samuel R. Peters as the representative of Kansas's 7th congressional district. However, he garnered minimal support, losing at the Republican convention in Dodge City to James Reed Hallowell, who would go on to lose to Populist Jerry Simpson.

Taming buffalo and even successfully training buffalo proved more successful for Jones who even worked a pair in harness. Jones' herd grew to become the largest private bison herd in the country, close to 150 head. But financial troubles during the hard times of the 1890s forced Jones to sell his herd to pay off his debts.

Jones lost his stock to creditors due to a severe national recession in the 1890s, selling his bison at public auction to pay his debts. Jones participated in the Oklahoma Land Run of 1893 and went to the Arctic Circle to find musk oxen. Toward decade's end, Mr. Jones went to Washington. One of the last wild buffalo herds—30 or so—lived in Yellowstone National Park, and poachers were quickly thinning its meager ranks. Jones petitioned the secretary of the Interior, proposing to “corral the once mighty herds of American bison” and relocate them at Yellowstone.

His first efforts met with indifference. In 1900 the government leased Jones 20,000 acres in New Mexico Territory to maintain a buffalo herd. In 1901 Congress finally acted on the Yellowstone situation, allocating $15,000 for an enclosure and stock to replenish the park's diminished herd. In 1902 conservationist U.S. President Theodore Roosevelt appointed Jones Yellowstone's first game warden. As one of his first official acts, Jones obtained three breeding bulls from Goodnight's buffalo herd. The following year, Yellowstone's superintendent proudly reported to Washington that the herd, “under the immediate charge of Mr. C.J. Jones, is doing exceedingly well".

Jones held the post for five years, but collected and bred buffalo for years afterward. This, along with his exploits in Africa (where among other feats he lassoed lions), made him a celebrity. Besides Hubbard, Grey and Roosevelt, his circle of friends included hide hunter William F. “Buffalo Bill” Cody (all of these men, including Jones, were also members of The Camp-Fire Club). Jones spent his last years in great demand on the lecture circuit, where he demonstrated his roping prowess and told thrilling—if embellished—tales.

Jones died October 1, 1919, from malaria contracted on his last African sojourn. Cody once dubbed him “King of the Cowboys.” Hubbard had crowned him “a king of nature, if anything is or can be". Yellowstone turned his former quarters into a Buffalo Jones museum. By the time he died, Jones was probably sure the buffalo no longer faced extinction. He'd have been proud that less than a century later the Yellowstone herd would number nearly 4,000. His finest tribute may be a modern one; in 2000 Robert Pickering, a deputy director of the Buffalo Bill Historical Center, would write, “Bison may be the first American environmental success story".

== Depiction in media ==
Popular western novelist Zane Grey wrote about his travels with Jones in his book, The Last of the Plainsmen. In 1976, a western film called Buffalo Rider was made. The movie was a loose depiction of Jones' life. The movie was also featured in the song "Guy on a Buffalo" by Austin band The Possum Posse. As well as shown during season 3 episode 6 of the TV series Yellowstone.

== See also ==
- Conservation of American bison

== Additional reading ==
- Marguerite Martyn, "Marguerite Martyn Ropes a Mighty Lariat Thrower," St. Louis Post-Dispatch, November 12, 1911, image 13
