= 1914 United States Senate election in Kansas =

- November 3, 1914
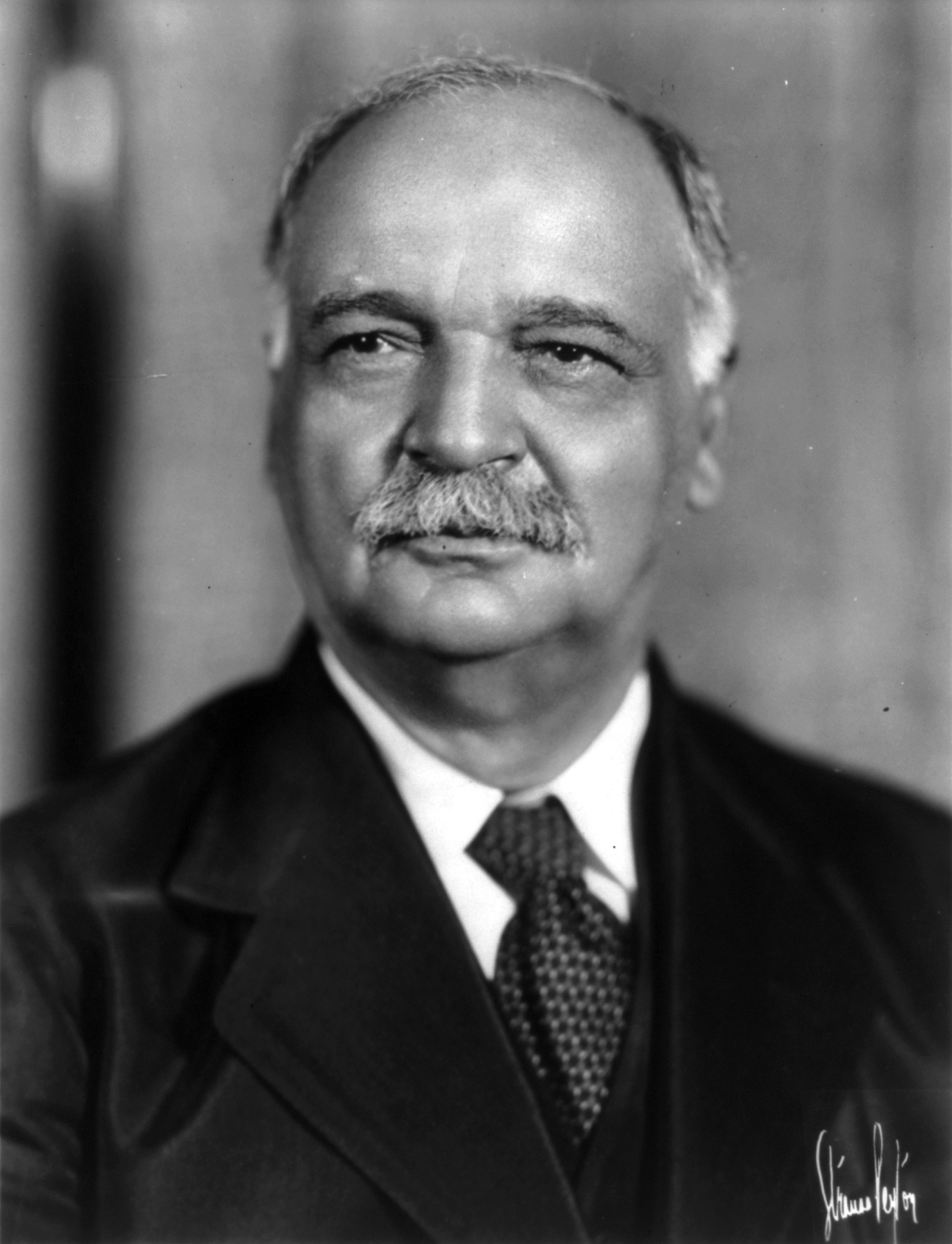

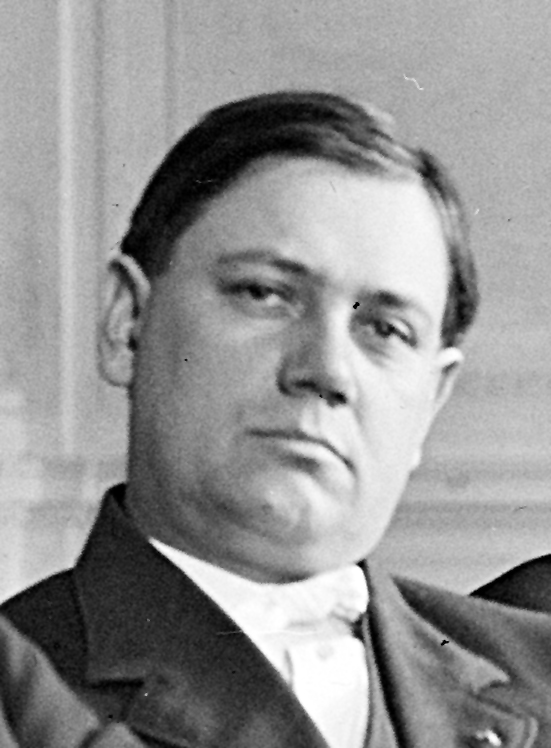

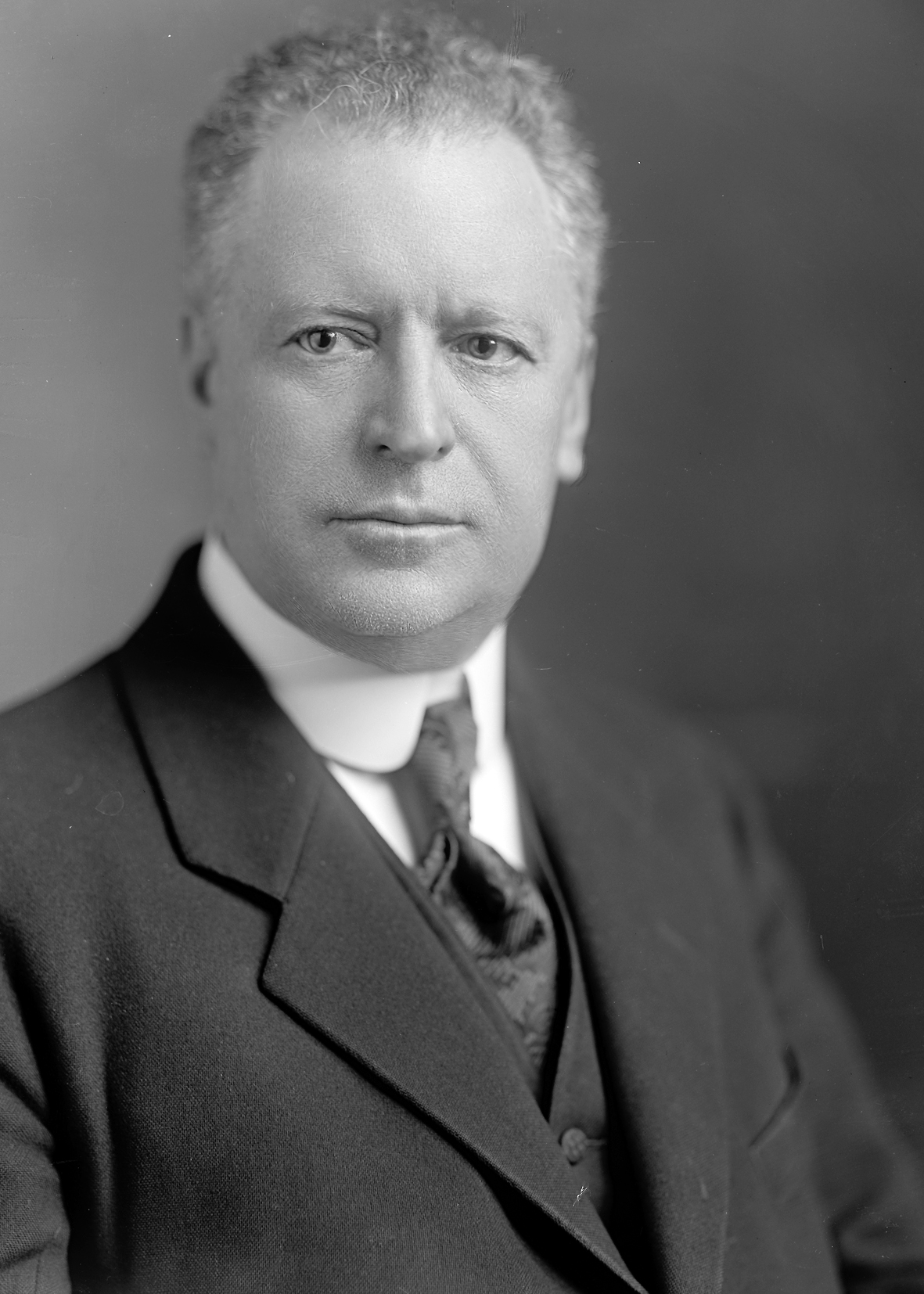
Nominee	Charles Curtis	George A. Neeley	Victor Murdock
Party	Republican	Democratic	Progressive
Popular vote	180,823	176,929	116,755
Percentage	35.53%	34.77%	22.94%
- Curtis: 30–40% 40–50% 50–60% Neeley: 30–40% 40–50% Murdock: 40–50% 50–60%
U.S. senator before election
Joseph L. Bristow
Republican
Elected U.S. Senator
Charles Curtis
Republican

The 1914 United States Senate election in Kansas was held on November 3, 1914, and was the first popular Senate election held in the state after the ratification of the Seventeenth Amendment. Incumbent Republican Senator Joseph L. Bristow ran for re-election to a second term, but he was narrowly defeated in the Republican primary by former Senator Charles Curtis. Two members of Congress—Democrat George A. Neeley from the 7th district and Progressive Victor Murdock from the 8th district—ran against Curtis in the general election. Curtis narrowly defeated them with a 36% plurality.

== Democratic primary ==
=== Candidates ===
- George A. Neeley, U.S. Representative from Kansas's 7th congressional district
- Hugh P. Farrelly, Chanute attorney, 1900 Democratic nominee for Attorney General, 1906 Democratic nominee for Lieutenant Governor
- Frank Doster, former Chief Justice of the Kansas Supreme Court
- Willis L. Brown, Speaker of the Kansas House of Representatives
- Jeremiah D. Botkin, Warden of the Kansas State Penitentiary
- William F. Sapp, state Democratic National Committeeman
- William C. Plumb, oil company lawyer

=== Results ===
Democratic primary results
Party	Candidate	Votes	%
Democratic	George A. Neeley	24,312	32.88%
Democratic	Hugh P. Farrelly	21,318	28.83%
Democratic	Frank Doster	9,275	12.54%
Democratic	Willis L. Brown	7,382	9.98%
Democratic	Jeremiah D. Botkin	5,503	7.44%
Democratic	William F. Sapp	3,992	5.40%
Democratic	William C. Plumb	2,160	2.92%
Total votes		73,942	100.00%

== Republican primary ==
Republican primary results by county Curtis: 30–40%; 40–50%; 50–60%; 60–70%; Bristow: 30–40%; 40–50%; 50–60%; 60–70%; 70–80%; 80–90%; Tucker: 40–50%; 70–80%

=== Candidates ===
- Charles Curtis, former U.S. Senator
- Joseph L. Bristow, incumbent U.S. Senator
- Henry H. Tucker, Jr., oil businessman
- A. M. Harvey, former Lieutenant Governor

=== Results ===
Republican primary results
Party	Candidate	Votes	%
Republican	Charles Curtis	44,612	39.20%
Republican	Joseph L. Bristow (inc.)	42,772	37.58%
Republican	Henry H. Tucker, Jr.	20,374	17.90%
Republican	A. M. Harvey	6,060	5.32%
Total votes		113,818	100.00%

== Prohibition primary ==
=== Candidates ===
- Earle R. DeLay

=== Results ===
Prohibition primary results
Party	Candidate	Votes	%
Prohibition	Earle R. DeLay	993	100.00%
Total votes		993	100.00%

== Progressive primary ==
=== Candidates ===
- Victor Murdock, U.S. Representative from Kansas's 8th congressional district

=== Results ===
Progressive primary results
Party	Candidate	Votes	%
Progressive	Victor Murdock	12,716	100.00%
Total votes		12,716	100.00%

== Socialist primary ==
=== Candidates ===
- Christian Balsac Hoffman

=== Results ===
Socialist primary results
Party	Candidate	Votes	%
Socialist	Christian Balsac Hoffman	5,503	100.00%
Total votes		5,503	100.00%

== General election ==
1914 United States Senate election in Kansas
Party	Candidate	Votes	%
Republican	Charles Curtis	180,823	35.53%
Democratic	George A. Neeley	176,929	34.77%
Progressive	Victor Murdock	116,755	22.94%
Socialist	Christian Balsac Hoffman	24,502	4.81%
Prohibition	Earle R. DeLay	9,885	1.94%
Total votes		508,894	100.00%
Republican hold			

== See also ==
- United States Senate elections, 1914
