= List of United States senators in the 60th Congress =

This is a complete list of United States senators during the 60th United States Congress listed by seniority from March 4, 1907, to March 3, 1909.

Order of service is based on the commencement of the senator's first term. After this is former service as a senator and then alphabetical order.

Senators whose service began in the middle of the Congress are listed at the end of the list with no number.

== Terms of service ==
Class	Terms of service of senators that expired in years
Class 3	Terms of service of senators that expired in 1909 (AL, AR, CA, CO, CT, FL, GA, IA, ID, IL, IN, KS, KY, LA, MD, MO, NC, ND, NH, NV, NY, OH, OK, OR, PA, SC, SD, UT, VT, WA, and WI.)
Class 1	Terms of service of senators that expired in 1911 (CA, CT, DE, FL, IN, MA, MD, ME, MI, MN, MO, MS, MT, ND, NE, NJ, NV, NY, OH, PA, RI, TN, TX, UT, VA, VT, WA, WI, WV, and WY.)
Class 2	Terms of service of senators that expired in 1913 (AL, AR, CO, DE, GA, IA, ID, IL, KS, KY, LA, MA, ME, MI, MN, MS, MT, NC, NE, NH, NJ, OK, OR, RI, SC, SD, TN, TX, VA, WV, and WY.)

== U.S. Senate seniority list ==
Rank	Senator (party-state)	Seniority date	Other factors
1	William B. Allison (R-IA)	March 4, 1873	
2	John Tyler Morgan (D-AL)	March 4, 1877	
3	Eugene Hale (R-ME)	March 4, 1881	
4	William P. Frye (R-ME)	March 18, 1881	
5	Nelson Aldrich (R-RI)	October 5, 1881	
6	Shelby Moore Cullom (R-IL)	March 4, 1883	
7	Henry M. Teller (D-CO)	March 4, 1885	
8	John W. Daniel (D-VA)	March 4, 1887	
9	Jacob H. Gallinger (R-NH)	March 4, 1891	
10	Henry C. Hansbrough (R-ND)	March 4, 1891	
11	Redfield Proctor (R-VT)	November 2, 1891	
12	Henry Cabot Lodge (R-MA)	March 4, 1893	
13	George C. Perkins (R-CA)	July 26, 1893	
14	Julius C. Burrows (R-MI)	January 23, 1895	
15	Clarence D. Clark (R-WY)	January 24, 1895	
16	Francis E. Warren (R-WY)	March 4, 1895	Previously served 1890–1893
17	Augustus O. Bacon (D-GA)	March 4, 1895	
18	Stephen Elkins (R-WV)	March 4, 1895	
19	Thomas S. Martin (D-VA)	March 4, 1895	
20	Knute Nelson (R-MN)	March 4, 1895	
21	Benjamin Tillman (D-SC)	March 4, 1895	
22	John C. Spooner (R-WI)	March 4, 1897	Previously served 1885–1891
23	Thomas C. Platt (R-NY)	March 4, 1897	Previously served 1881
24	Alexander Clay (D-GA)	March 4, 1897	
25	Joseph Foraker (R-OH)	March 4, 1897	
26	Samuel McEnery (D-LA)	March 4, 1897	
27	Boies Penrose (R-PA)	March 4, 1897	
28	Edmund Pettus (D-AL)	March 4, 1897	
29	Stephen Mallory (D-FL)	March 4, 1897	
30	Hernando Money (D-MS)	October 8, 1897	
31	Charles A. Culberson (D-TX)	March 4, 1899	
32	Chauncey Depew (R-NY)	March 4, 1899	
33	Albert J. Beveridge (R-IN)	March 4, 1899	
34	John Kean (R-NJ)	March 4, 1899	
35	Porter McCumber (R-ND)	March 4, 1899	
36	Nathan B. Scott (R-WV)	March 4, 1899	
37	James Taliaferro (D-FL)	April 20, 1899	
38	Jonathan P. Dolliver (R-IA)	August 22, 1900	
39	William P. Dillingham (R-VT)	October 18, 1900	
40	Moses Clapp (R-MN)	January 23, 1901	
41	Anselm J. McLaurin (D-MS)	March 4, 1901	Previously served 1894–1895
42	Joseph W. Bailey (D-TX)	March 4, 1901	
43	Henry E. Burnham (R-NH)	March 4, 1901	
44	Murphy J. Foster (D-LA)	March 4, 1901	
45	Robert J. Gamble (R-SD)	March 4, 1901	
46	Furnifold M. Simmons (D-NC)	March 4, 1901	
47	Alfred B. Kittredge (R-SD)	July 1, 1901	
48	Levi Ankeny (R-WA)	March 4, 1903	
49	James P. Clarke (D-AR)	March 4, 1903	
50	Charles W. Fulton (R-OR)	March 4, 1903	
51	Weldon B. Heyburn (R-ID)	March 4, 1903	
52	Albert J. Hopkins (R-IL)	March 4, 1903	
53	Asbury Latimer (D-SC)	March 4, 1903	
54	Chester Long (R-KS)	March 4, 1903	
55	James B. McCreary (D-KY)	March 4, 1903	
56	Francis Newlands (D-NV)	March 4, 1903	
57	Lee S. Overman (D-NC)	March 4, 1903	
58	Reed Smoot (R-UT)	March 4, 1903	
59	William J. Stone (D-MO)	March 4, 1903	
60	Charles Dick (R-OH)	March 23, 1904	
61	Philander C. Knox (R-PA)	June 10, 1904	
62	Winthrop M. Crane (R-MA)	October 12, 1904	
63	Thomas Carter (R-MT)	March 4, 1905	Previously served 1895–1901
64	Morgan Bulkeley (R-CT)	March 4, 1905	
65	Elmer Burkett (R-NE)	March 4, 1905	
66	Frank P. Flint (R-CA)	March 4, 1905	
67	James Hemenway (R-IN)	March 4, 1905	
68	George S. Nixon (R-NV)	March 4, 1905	
69	Samuel H. Piles (R-WA)	March 4, 1905	
70	Isidor Rayner (D-MD)	March 4, 1905	
71	George Sutherland (R-UT)	March 4, 1905	
72	William Warner (R-MO)	March 18, 1905	
73	James B. Frazier (D-TN)	March 21, 1905	
74	Frank B. Brandegee (R-CT)	May 10, 1905	
75	Robert M. La Follette, Sr. (R-WI)	January 4, 1906	
76	William Pinkney Whyte (D-MD)	June 8, 1906	
77	Henry du Pont (R-DE)	June 13, 1906	
78	Charles Curtis (R-KS)	January 29, 1907	
79	William A. Smith (R-MI)	February 9, 1907	
80	William Borah (R-ID)	March 4, 1907	
81	Jonathan Bourne, Jr. (R-OR)	March 4, 1907	
82	Frank O. Briggs (R-NJ)	March 4, 1907	
83	Norris Brown (R-NE)	March 4, 1907	
84	Jeff Davis (D-AR)	March 4, 1907	
85	Joseph M. Dixon (R-MT)	March 4, 1907	
86	Simon Guggenheim (R-CO)	March 4, 1907	
87	Thomas H. Paynter (D-KY)	March 4, 1907	
88	Harry A. Richardson (R-DE)	March 4, 1907	
89	Robert Love Taylor (D-TN)	March 4, 1907	
90	Isaac Stephenson (R-WI)	May 17, 1907	
	John H. Bankhead (D-AL)	June 18, 1907	
	Joseph F. Johnston (D-AL)	August 6, 1907	
	Thomas Gore (D-OK)	December 11, 1907	
	Robert Owen (D-OK)	December 11, 1907	
	William J. Bryan (D-FL)	December 26, 1907	
	George P. Wetmore (D-RI)	January 22, 1908	
	Frank B. Gary (D-SC)	March 6, 1908	
	John W. Stewart (R-VT)	March 24, 1908	
	John Walter Smith (D-MD)	March 25, 1908	
	William H. Milton (D-FL)	March 27, 1908	
	Carroll S. Page (R-VT)	October 21, 1908	
	Albert B. Cummins (R-IA)	November 24, 1908	

== See also ==
- 60th United States Congress
- List of United States representatives in the 60th Congress
