= Justice Green =

Justice Green or Justice Greene may refer to:

- Adrian Lawrence Greene (1848–1907), associate justice of the Kansas Supreme Court
- Clayton Greene Jr. (born 1951), judge of the Maryland Court of Appeals
- George Greene (judge) (1817–1880), associate justice of the Iowa Supreme Court
- Grafton Green (1872–1947), associate justice of the Tennessee Supreme Court
- Henry Green (English judge) (died 1369), chief justice of the Court of King's Bench
- Henry Green (Pennsylvania judge) (1828–1900), chief justice of the Supreme Court of Pennsylvania
- John W. Green (Virginia politician) (1781–1834), associate justice of the Virginia Supreme Court of Appeals
- Nathan Green Sr. (1792–1866), associate justice of the Tennessee Supreme Court
- Nicholas Green (judge) (born 1958), judge of the Court of Appeals of England and Wales
- Paul W. Green (born 1952), associate justice of the Supreme Court of Texas
- Richard Ward Greene (1792–1875), chief justice of the Rhode Island Supreme Court
- Samuel Green (judge) (1770–1851), associate justice of the New Hampshire Supreme Court
- Sanford M. Green (1807–1901), associate justice of the Michigan Supreme Court
- Thomas C. Green (1820–1889), associate justice of the Supreme Court of Appeals of West Virginia
- Thomas Greene (Rhode Island) (fl. 1760s–1770s), associate justice of the Rhode Island Supreme Court

== See also ==
- Judge Green (disambiguation)
