= Judge Green =

Judge Green or Greene may refer to:

- Ben Charles Green (1905–1983), judge of the United States District Court for the Northern District of Ohio
- Clifford Scott Green (1923–2007), judge of the United States District Court for the Eastern District of Pennsylvania
- Edward T. Green (1837–1896), judge of the United States District Court for the District of New Jersey
- Harold H. Greene (1923–2000), judge of the United States District Court for the District of Columbia
- John Thomas Greene Jr. (1929–2011), judge of the United States District Court for the District of Utah
- Joyce Hens Green (born 1928), judge of the United States District Court for the District of Columbia
- June Lazenby Green (1914–2001), judge of the United States District Court for the District of Columbia
- William P. Greene Jr. (born 1943), judge of the United States Court of Appeals for Veterans Claims
- William R. Green (1856–1947), judge of the United States Court of Claims
- William R. Green Jr. (c. 1889–1966), judge of the United States Board of Tax Appeals

== See also ==
- Justice Green (disambiguation)
