= Alfred W. Benson =

American judge (1843–1916)

Alfred Washburn Benson
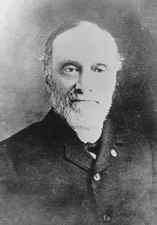

Justice of the Kansas Supreme Court
- In office 1907–1915

United States Senator from Kansas
- In office June 11, 1906 – January 23, 1907
- Appointed by: Edward W. Hoch
- Preceded by: Joseph R. Burton
- Succeeded by: Charles Curtis

Member of the Kansas Senate
- In office 1881–1885

Personal details
- Born: July 15, 1843 Poland, New York, U.S.
- Died: January 1, 1916 (aged 72) Topeka, Kansas, U.S.
- Party: Republican

Alfred Washburn Benson, also known as Albert Washburn Benson (July 15, 1843 – January 1, 1916) was an American attorney, politician, and jurist who served as a United States senator from Kansas.

== Early life and education ==
Born in Poland, Chautauqua County, New York, Benon moved to Jamestown, New York, in 1860, and attended Jamestown and Randolph Academies.

== Career ==
During the Civil War, he enlisted in 1862 as a private in the 154th New York Infantry Regiment, and at the close of the war held a commission as major.

He studied law, and was admitted to the bar in Buffalo, New York, in 1866 and commenced practice in Sherman, New York. He moved to Ottawa, Kansas, in 1869, held various local offices, and was a member of the Kansas Senate from 1881 to 1885.

He was a judge of the fourth judicial district of Kansas from 1885 to 1897, and was appointed as a Republican to the U.S. Senate to fill the vacancy caused by the resignation of Joseph R. Burton; he served from June 11, 1906, to January 23, 1907, when a successor was elected.

He was an unsuccessful candidate for election in 1907 to fill this vacancy, and was appointed and subsequently elected justice of the Kansas Supreme Court, on which he served from 1907 to 1915, when he resigned.

== Personal life ==
He retired from public life and died in Topeka in 1916, aged 72. Interment was in Highland Cemetery, Ottawa, Kansas.

U.S. Senate
Preceded by Joseph R. Burton	U.S. senator (Class 2) from Kansas; 1906–1907; Served alongside: Chester I. Long	Succeeded by Charles Curtis
Political offices
Preceded by Adrian Lawrence Greene	Justice of the Kansas Supreme Court; 1907-1915	Succeeded by John Marshall
