= Richard Ely Bird =

American politician (1878–1955)

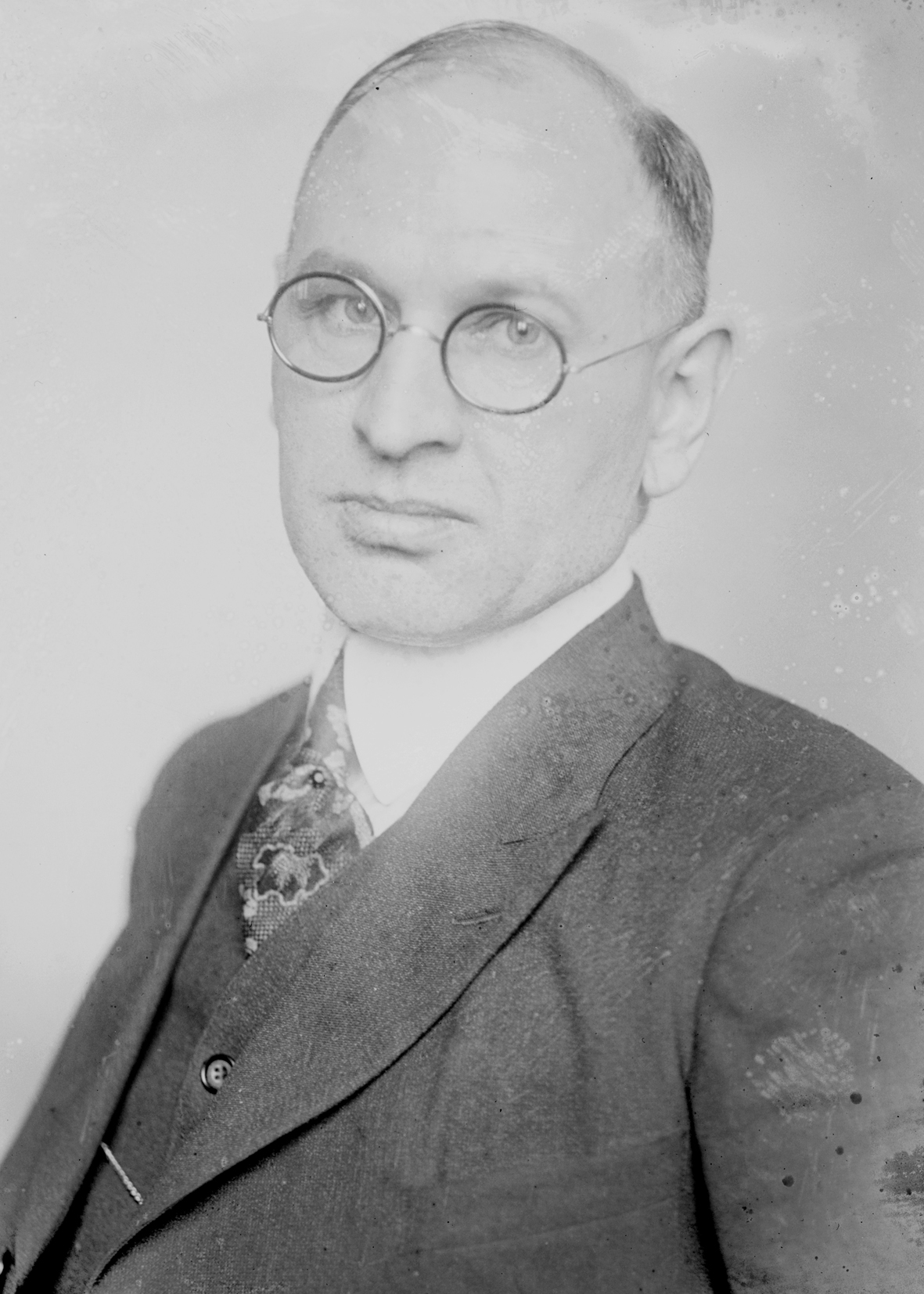

Member of the U.S. House of Representatives from Kansas's 8th district
- In office March 4, 1921 – March 4, 1923
- Preceded by: William Augustus Ayres
- Succeeded by: William Augustus Ayres

Personal details
- Born: November 4, 1878 Cincinnati, Ohio, U.S.
- Died: January 10, 1955 (aged 76) Long Beach, California, U.S.
- Party: Republican

Richard Ely Bird (November 4, 1878 – January 10, 1955) was a Republican member of the United States House of Representatives for the 8th District of Kansas from 1921 to 1923. Bird was born in Cincinnati, Ohio on November 4, 1878. He moved with his parents to Wichita, Kansas in 1887 and attended the public schools there. He was graduated from Wichita High School in 1898. Bird later studied law and was admitted to the Kansas bar in 1901. He opened his legal practice in Wichita. In 1916 he became a judge of the district court of the 18th Judicial District of Kansas and was serving in that capacity when elected to congress during the Warren G. Harding presidential landslide of 1920.

Bird unseated incumbent Democratic Congressman William Ayres by a narrow margin of 30,076 (49.4%) to 29,899 (49.1%). Bird's victory meant that all eight Kansas congressional districts would be represented by Republicans. Rep. Bird would lose his reelection bid in 1922 by a margin of 37,581 (62%) to 22,721 (38%) against former Congressman Ayres and thus resumed the practice of law. Bird ran once more for congress in 1928 against Rep. Ayres but lost by a total of 46,117 (58%) to 32,802 (42%) despite the Herbert Hoover Republican landslide. He retired from public life in 1937 and moved to Long Beach, California, where he died on January 10, 1955. He is buried in Maplegrove Cemetery in Wichita, Kansas.

U.S. House of Representatives
Preceded by William A. Ayres	Member of the U.S. House of Representatives from Kansas's 8th congressional district March 4, 1921–March 3, 1923	Succeeded by William A. Ayres
