= William Augustus Ayres =

American politician (1867–1952)

William A. Ayres
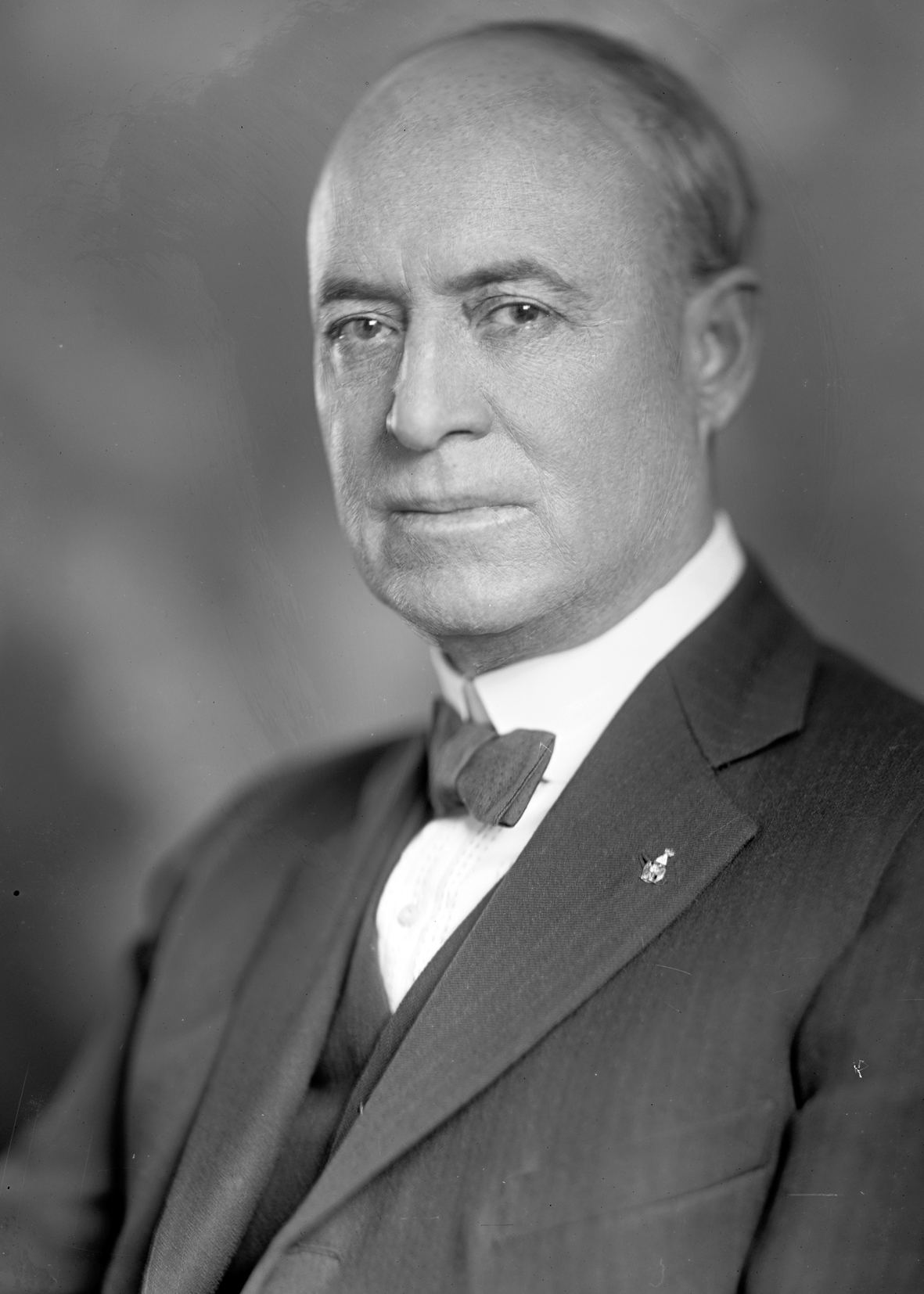
- Ayres, 1905–1945

Member of the U.S. House of Representatives from Kansas
- In office March 4, 1915 – March 3, 1921
- Preceded by: Victor Murdock
- Succeeded by: Richard E. Bird
- Constituency: 8th district
- In office March 4, 1923 – August 22, 1934
- Preceded by: Richard E. Bird (8th); James G. Strong (5th)
- Succeeded by: District eliminated (8th); John M. Houston (5th)
- Constituency: 8th district (1923-33); 5th district (1933-34)

Personal details
- Born: April 19, 1867 Elizabethtown, Illinois, U.S.
- Died: February 17, 1952 (aged 84) Washington, D.C., U.S.
- Party: Democratic

William Augustus Ayres (April 19, 1867 – February 17, 1952) was a Democratic member of the U.S. House of Representatives from Kansas and a Federal Trade Commissioner.

== Political career ==
Ayres was elected as a Democrat to the Sixty-fourth, Sixty-fifth, and Sixty-sixth Congresses. He was an unsuccessful candidate for reelection in 1920 to the Sixty-seventh Congress. He was elected to the Sixty-eighth and to the five succeeding Congresses and served until his resignation effective August 22, 1934, having been appointed a member of the Federal Trade Commission on June 30, 1934, in which capacity he served until his death in Washington, D.C., in 1952. He is buried in the Old Mission Cemetery in Wichita, Kansas.

U.S. House of Representatives
Preceded by Victor Murdock	Member of the U.S. House of Representatives from Kansas's 8th congressional district 1915 - 1921	Succeeded by Richard Ely Bird
Preceded by Richard Ely Bird	Member of the U.S. House of Representatives from Kansas's 8th congressional district 1923 - 1933	District eliminated
Preceded by James George Strong	Member of the U.S. House of Representatives from Kansas's 5th congressional district 1933 - 1934	Succeeded by John Mills Houston
