= Hallowell, Kansas =

Unincorporated community in Cherokee County, Kansas

- CDP
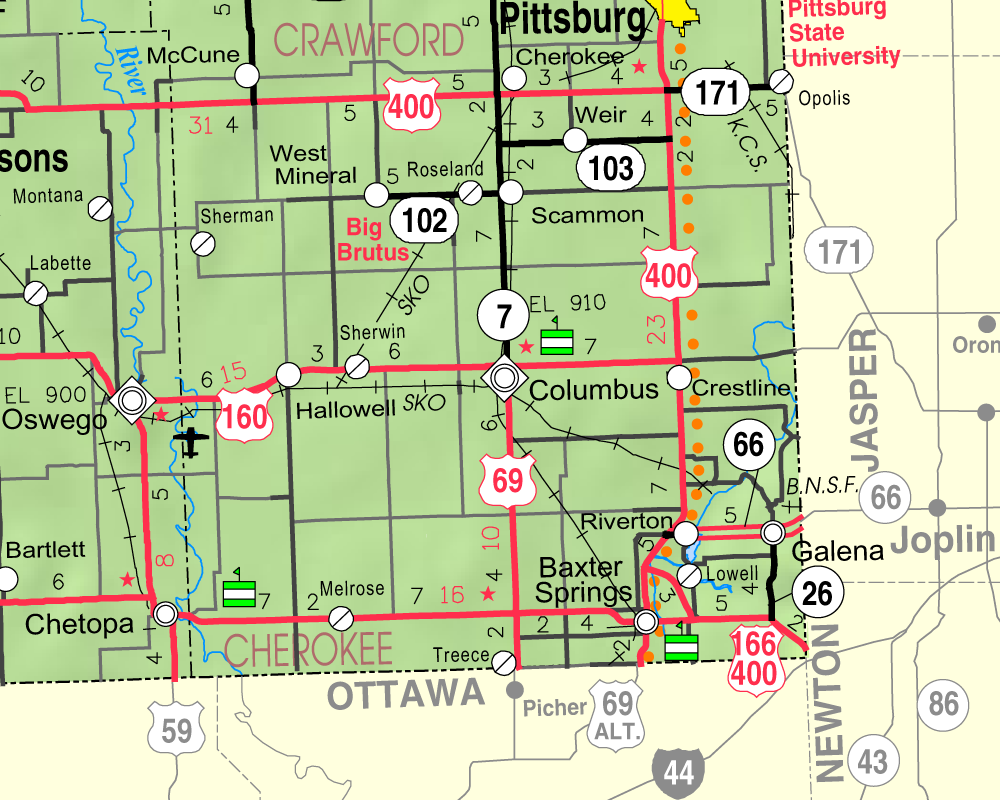
- KDOT map of Cherokee County (legend)

- Location within Kansas Location within the United States
- Coordinates: 37°10′25″N 94°59′52″W
- Country: United States
- State: Kansas
- County: Cherokee
- Elevation: 843 ft (257 m)

Population (2020)
  - Total: 101
- Time zone: UTC-6 (CST)
  - Summer (DST): UTC-5 (CDT)
- Area code: 620
- FIPS code: 20-29550
- GNIS ID: 2806493

Hallowell is a census-designated place (CDP) in Cherokee County, Kansas, United States. As of the 2020 census, the population was 101.

== History ==
Hallowell was named after James Reed Hallowell, who served in both houses of the Kansas Legislature. Hallowell was a station on the St. Louis–San Francisco Railway.

== Demographics ==
Historical population
Census	Pop.	Note	%±
2020	101		—
U.S. Decennial Census

The 2020 United States census counted 101 people, 38 households, and 26 families in Hallowell. The population density was 116.9 per square mile (45.1/km^{2}). There were 44 housing units at an average density of 50.9 per square mile (19.7/km^{2}). The racial makeup was 91.09% (92) white or European American (91.09% non-Hispanic white), 0.99% (1) black or African-American, 0.0% (0) Native American or Alaska Native, 0.99% (1) Asian, 0.0% (0) Pacific Islander or Native Hawaiian, 1.98% (2) from other races, and 4.95% (5) from two or more races. Hispanic or Latino of any race was 0.99% (1) of the population.

Of the 38 households, 44.7% had children under the age of 18; 39.5% were married couples living together; 13.2% had a female householder with no spouse or partner present. 26.3% of households consisted of individuals and 10.5% had someone living alone who was 65 years of age or older. The average household size was 2.7 and the average family size was 2.7. The percent of those with a bachelor's degree or higher was estimated to be 0.0% of the population.

28.7% of the population was under the age of 18, 4.0% from 18 to 24, 14.9% from 25 to 44, 34.7% from 45 to 64, and 17.8% who were 65 years of age or older. The median age was 47.3 years. For every 100 females, there were 74.1 males. For every 100 females ages 18 and older, there were 94.6 males.

The 2016–2020 5-year American Community Survey estimates show that the median household income was $27,000 (with a margin of error of +/- $9,187). Males had a median income of $21,607 (+/- $4,595). The median income for those above 16 years old was $20,714 (+/- $2,643). Approximately, 0.0% of families and 4.9% of the population were below the poverty line, including 28.6% of those under the age of 18 and 0.0% of those ages 65 or over.

== See also ==
- Big Brutus
