= Joseph R. Burton =

First American Senator convicted of a crime

Joseph Burton
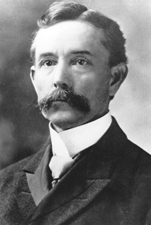

United States Senator from Kansas
- In office March 4, 1901 – June 4, 1906
- Preceded by: Lucien Baker
- Succeeded by: Alfred W. Benson

Member of the Kansas House of Representatives
- In office 1882–1892

Personal details
- Born: Joseph Ralph Burton; November 16, 1852 Mitchell, Indiana, U.S.
- Died: February 27, 1923 (aged 70) Los Angeles, California, U.S.
- Party: Republican
- Education: United States Naval Academy; Franklin College, Indiana; DePauw University

Joseph Ralph Burton (November 16, 1852 – February 27, 1923) was an American lawyer and United States Senator from the state of Kansas. He was the first Senator to be convicted of a crime. He served in the Kansas House of Representatives several times in the 1880s and was elected to the United States Senate in 1901, but he was convicted of accepting bribes in 1905. He appealed twice to the Supreme Court, but the judgment was eventually upheld and he resigned. He lived out his life as a lawyer and newspaperman.

== Early life ==
Burton was born and reared on his father's farm near Mitchell, Indiana. His father, Allen C. Burton, was descended from English ancestors, who came to America to escape the reign of Cromwell in the 1650s, and settled near Richmond, Virginia. His great-grandfather, John P. Burton, moved to North Carolina during the Revolutionary War, and in 1820 went to Indiana, where he founded the Indiana line of Burtons. His mother, Elizabeth Holmes, was of Scottish-German descent.

He attended the district school and the academy at Mitchell, and at the age of sixteen received an appointment as cadet at the United States Naval Academy at Annapolis, but failed to pass the physical examination. He taught school for a time, spent three years in Franklin College (Indiana), and one year at DePauw University at Greencastle.

== Lawyer ==
In 1874 Burton began to read law in the office of Gordon, Brown & Lamb, at Indianapolis, and in 1875 was admitted to the bar. In the spring of that year, he married Mrs. Carrie (Mitchell) Webster of Princeton. In 1876 Burton was nominated by the Republicans for presidential elector and made many speeches during the campaign. In 1878 he moved to Abilene, Kansas, where he formed a partnership with Judge John H. Mahan for the practice of law.

== Politician ==
He was elected to the Kansas House of Representatives in 1882; was re-elected in 1884 and again in 1888; and was appointed a member of the World's Fair Columbian Commission at Chicago in 1893, representing Kansas. In 1895 Burton came within one vote of being the Republican Party nominee for United States Senator. But in January 1901, he was elected Senator and began service on March 4, 1901. While in the Senate, he was chairman of the Committee on Forest Reservations and Game Protection (Fifty-seventh and Fifty-eighth Congresses). He served until June 4, 1906, when he resigned.

== Corruption conviction ==
On January 23, 1904, Burton was indicted by a Federal grand jury at St. Louis, Missouri, on the charge of having accepted $2,500 from the Rialto Grain and Securities company (a "get-rich-quick" concern), to represent Rialto before the Post Office. He was to have prevented the issuance of a fraud order against the company, thus denying it the use of the US mails. Burton was tried before Judge Adams of the U.S. District Court for the Eastern District of Missouri, in St. Louis, found guilty in March and sentenced to pay a fine of $2,500 and serve six months in the jail at Ironton, Missouri. He was the first United States Senator to be convicted of a crime.

He appealed the case to the United States Supreme Court, which in January 1905, reversed the decision of the district court, on the grounds that the venue was improper since the money was paid to Burton in Washington, D.C., and remanded the case for a new trial there. The second trial was before Judge Willis Van Devanter of the United States circuit court (later a Supreme Court justice). In November 1905 Burton was given the same sentence. A second appeal to the Supreme Court followed, and this time the decision of the lower court was sustained.

On June 4, 1906, Burton resigned from the Senate.

== Later life ==
After his resignation, he returned to his law practice in Abilene and engaged in the newspaper business.

Joseph Burton died in Los Angeles, California, in 1923; the body was cremated and the ashes deposited in the columbarium of the Los Angeles Crematory Association. The ashes were removed in 1928 for burial in the Burton family plot in Abilene Cemetery.

== See also ==
- List of American federal politicians convicted of crimes
- List of federal political scandals in the United States
- List of United States senators expelled or censured

U.S. Senate
Preceded by Lucien Baker	U.S. Senator (Class 2) from Kansas; 1901–1906; Served alongside: William Harris, Chester I. Long	Succeeded by Alfred W. Benson
