= George A. Neeley =

American politician

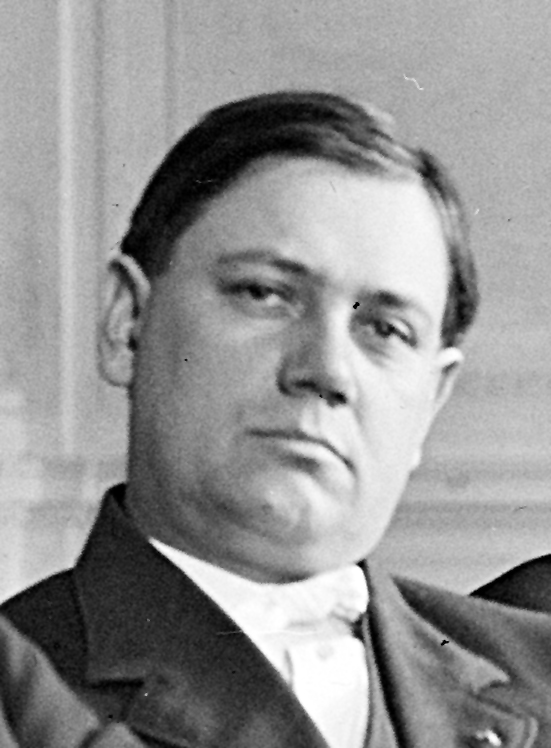

Member of the U.S. House of Representatives from Kansas's 7th district
- In office January 9, 1912 – March 3, 1915
- Preceded by: Edmond H. Madison
- Succeeded by: Jouett Shouse

Personal details
- Born: August 1, 1879 Detroit, Illinois
- Died: January 1, 1919 (aged 39) Hutchinson, Kansas
- Party: Democratic

George Arthur Neeley (August 1, 1879 – January 1, 1919) was a U.S. representative from Kansas.

Born in Detroit, Illinois, Neeley attended public schools in Joplin, Missouri and Wellston, Oklahoma. He earned a B.S. from Southwestern Baptist University (now Union University) in Jackson, Tennessee in 1902. This was followed by a J.D. from the University of Kansas in Lawrence, Kansas in 1904. He was employed for a while as a farmer and a teacher, before becoming a lawyer in private practice. He was an unsuccessful candidate for United States Representative to the 61st Congress in 1910.

Neeley was elected as a Democrat in a special election to fill the vacancy caused by the death of Edmond H. Madison to the 62nd Congress and to the succeeding Congress (January 9, 1912 - March 3, 1915). He was not a candidate for reelection to the 64th Congress in 1914, but was an unsuccessful candidate for election to the United States Senate. He died in Hutchinson, Kansas, and was interred in Oak Park Cemetery, Chandler, Oklahoma.

His daughter was Science Fiction author Margaret St. Clair.

Party political offices
| First | Democratic nominee for U.S. Senator from Kansas (Class 3); 1914 | Succeeded by George H. Hodges |
U.S. House of Representatives
| Preceded by Edmond H. Madison | Member of the U.S. House of Representatives from Kansas's 7th congressional district 1912 – 1915 | Succeeded by Jouett Shouse |
