= Victor Murdock =

American politician (1871–1945)

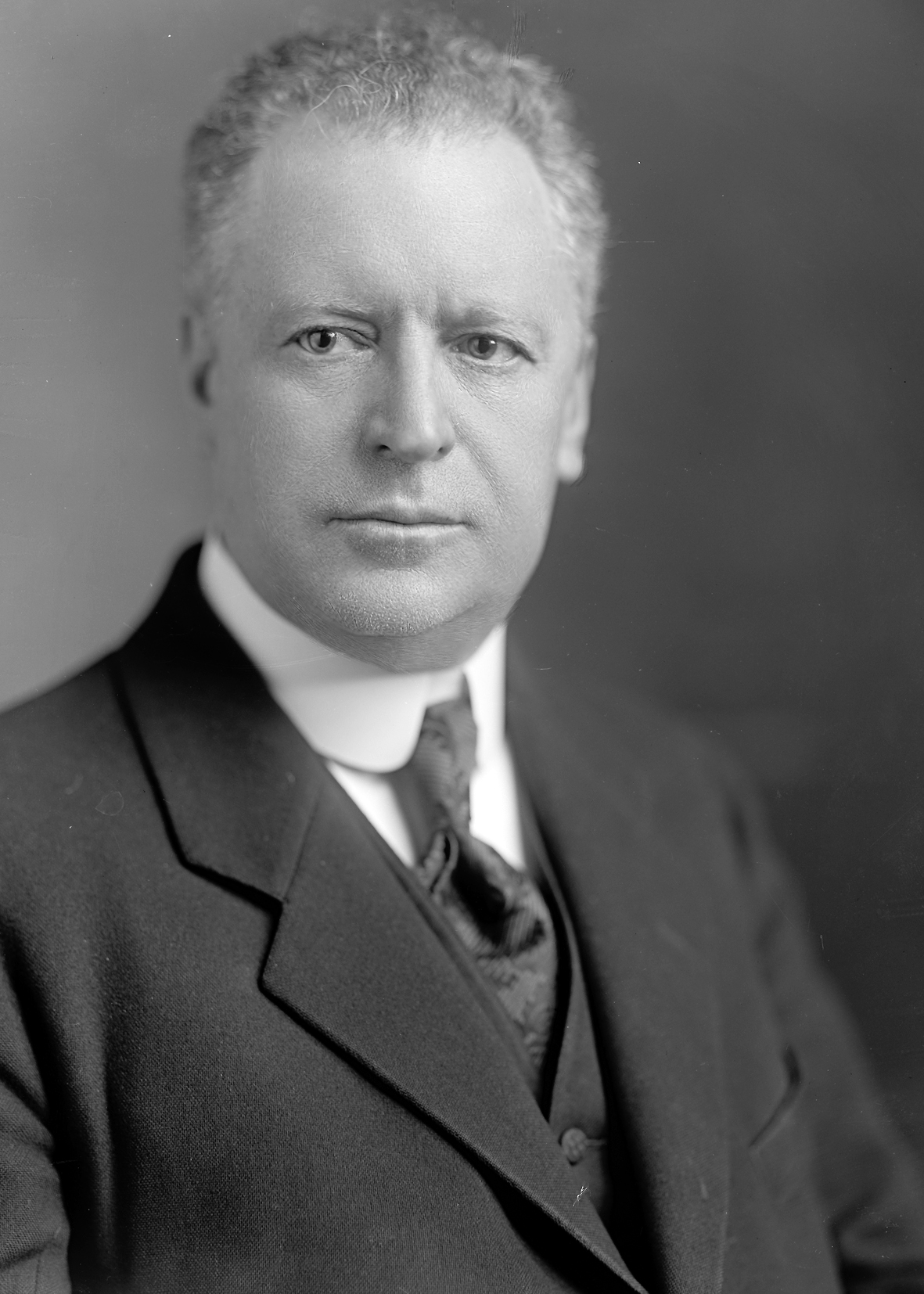
- Murdock, 1905–1945

Member of the U.S. House of Representatives from Kansas
- In office May 26, 1903 – March 4, 1915
- Preceded by: Chester I. Long
- Succeeded by: William Augustus Ayres
- Constituency: 7th district (1903–07); 8th district (1907–15)

Personal details
- Born: March 18, 1871 Burlingame, Kansas, U.S.
- Died: July 8, 1945 (aged 74) Wichita, Kansas, U.S.
- Party: Republican
- Other political affiliations: Progressive Party
- Spouse: Mary Pearl Allen
- Children: 2
- Parents: Marshall Murdock (father); Victoria Mayberry Murdock (mother)

Victor Murdock (March 18, 1871 – July 8, 1945) was an American politician and newspaper editor who served as a U.S. representative from Kansas.

== Life ==
Victor Murdock was born on March 18, 1871, in Burlingame, Kansas, to Marshall Murdock, editor of the Osage County Chronicle, and Victoria Mayberry Murdock. In 1872, the family moved to Wichita, where Murdock received his common school education and began learning the printing trade. At the age of 15, Murdock became a reporter. In 1890, he married Mary Pearl Allen and spent some time in Chicago, where he worked on the Chicago Inter Ocean. From 1894 to 1903, he worked as the managing editor of The Wichita Eagle. In 1892, he reported on and future president William McKinley's campaign for governor of Ohio.

Murdock was covering the Kansas Legislature in 1903 when he decided to run for a vacancy in the United States House of Representatives and was elected to succeed Chester I. Long, who had resigned to take a seat in the United States Senate. He took office on November 9, 1903. During the 1912 United States presidential election, he left the Republican Party to support and join former President Theodore Roosevelt's Progressive Party and was the party's choice for Speaker of the House in 1912. Murdock served in Congress until March 3, 1915.

He was elected as chairman of the Progressive Party in 1914 and 1916. In 1916, when Theodore Roosevelt refused the party's nomination for president, the Progressive Party instead nominated Murdock, but he did not appear on the ballot. Murdock worked as a war correspondent in 1916, and in 1917, he was appointed to the Federal Trade Commission by President Woodrow Wilson. Murdock served in that role until his resignation in 1924 to become the editor for The Wichita Eagle, until his death in Wichita on July 8, 1945.

Party political offices
First after direct election of Senators was adopted in 1913	Progressive (Bull Moose) nominee for U.S. Senator from Kansas (Class 3); 1914	Party dissolved
U.S. House of Representatives
Preceded by Chester I. Long	Member of the U.S. House of Representatives from Kansas's 7th congressional district May 26, 1903–March 3, 1907	Succeeded by Edmond H. Madison
Preceded by District created	Member of the U.S. House of Representatives from Kansas's 8th congressional district March 4, 1907–March 3, 1915	Succeeded by William A. Ayres
