= Kansas's 8th congressional district =

Former U.S. House district from 1903 to 1933

- Obsolete district
- Created: 1907
- Eliminated: 1930
- Years active: 1907-1933

Kansas's 8th congressional district for the United States House of Representatives was a congressional district in the state of Kansas.

It was created in 1903, and it existed until 1933. William Augustus Ayres was the final person to represent the district before he was redistricted to the now-defunct 5th congressional district. Throughout its history it only had 3 representatives.

== List of members representing the district ==
Member	Party	Years	Cong ress	Electoral history
District created March 4, 1907
Victor Murdock (Wichita)	Republican	March 4, 1907 – March 3, 1915	60th 61st 62nd 63rd	Redistricted from the 7th district and re-elected in 1906. Re-elected in 1908. Re-elected in 1910. Re-elected in 1912. Retired to run for U.S. senator.
William Augustus Ayres (Wichita)	Democratic	March 4, 1915 – March 3, 1921	64th 65th 66th	Elected in 1914. Re-elected in 1916. Re-elected in 1918. Lost re-election.
Richard Ely Bird (Wichita)	Republican	March 4, 1921 – March 3, 1923	67th	Elected in 1920. Lost re-election.
William Augustus Ayres (Wichita)	Democratic	March 4, 1923 – March 3, 1933	68th 69th 70th 71st 72nd	Elected in 1922. Re-elected in 1924. Re-elected in 1926; Re-elected in 1928. Re-elected in 1930. Redistricted to the 5th district.
District eliminated March 3, 1933
