= Edmond H. Madison =

American politician

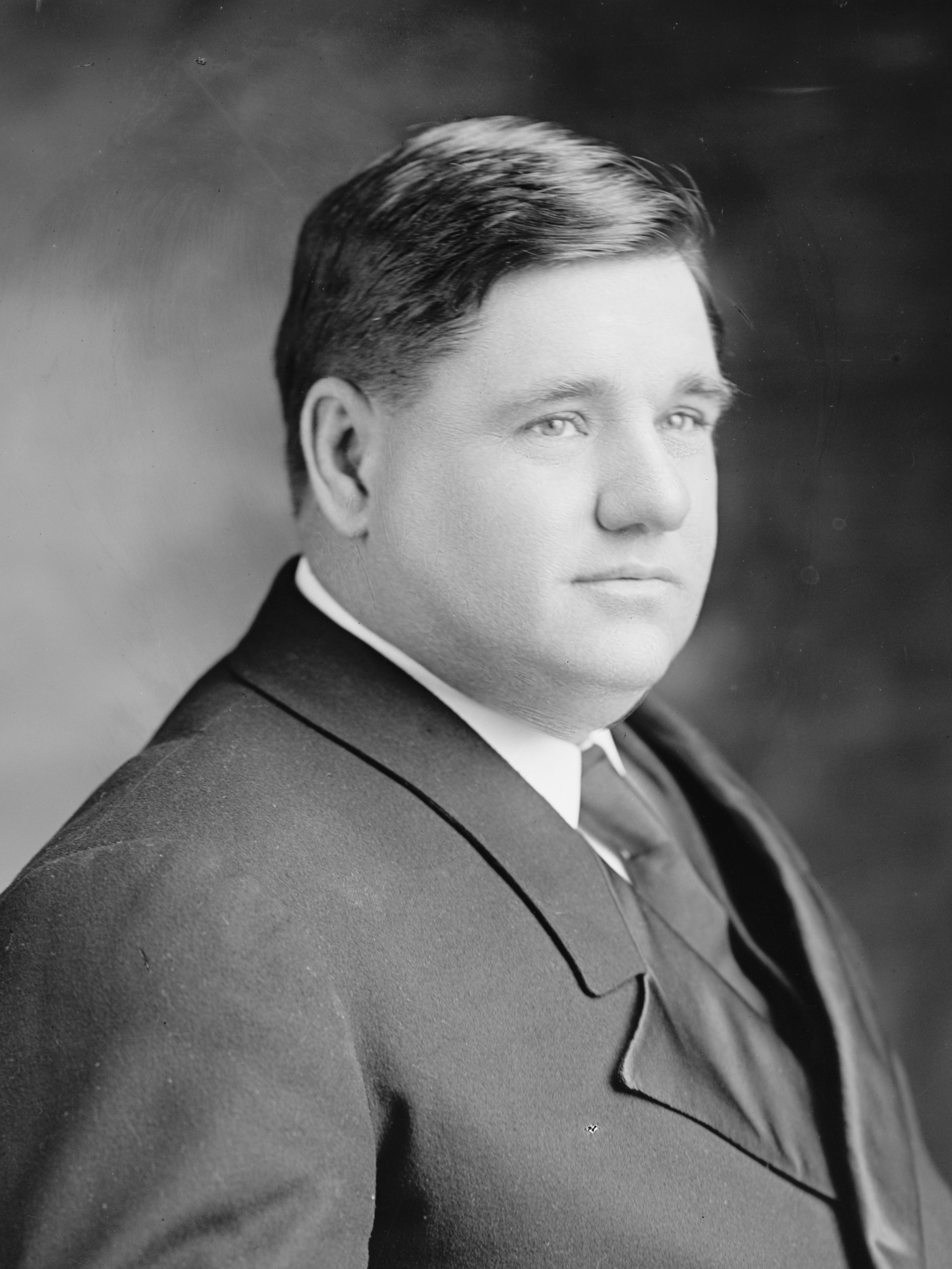
- Madison c. 1905–1911

Member of the U.S. House of Representatives from Kansas's 7th district
- In office March 4, 1907 – September 18, 1911
- Preceded by: Victor Murdock
- Succeeded by: George A. Neeley

Personal details
- Born: December 18, 1865 Plymouth, Illinois, US
- Died: September 18, 1911 (aged 45) Dodge City, Kansas, US
- Party: Republican

Edmond Haggard Madison (December 18, 1865 – September 18, 1911) was a U.S. representative from Kansas.

Born in Plymouth, Illinois, Madison attended common schools. He taught in school. He moved to Wichita, Kansas, in 1885. He studied law and was admitted to the bar in 1888, before commencing legal practice in Dodge City, Kansas. He served as prosecuting attorney of Ford County, Kansas from 1889 to 1893. He was appointed judge of the thirty-first judicial district of Kansas on January 1, 1900, and served until September 17, 1906, when he resigned to become a candidate for Congress.

Madison was elected as a Republican to the Sixtieth, Sixty-first, and Sixty-second Congresses and served from March 4, 1907, until his death in Dodge City on September 18, 1911. He was interred in Maple Grove Cemetery.

== See also ==
- List of members of the United States Congress who died in office (1900–1949)

U.S. House of Representatives
Preceded by Victor Murdock	Member of the U.S. House of Representatives from Kansas's 7th congressional district March 4, 1907–September 18, 1911	Succeeded by George A. Neeley
