= Adrian Lawrence Greene =

American judge (1848–1907)

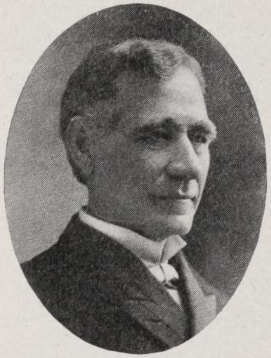

Justice of the Kansas Supreme Court
- In office January 15, 1901 – July 28, 1907
- Appointed by: William E. Stanley
- Preceded by: Newly Created Position
- Succeeded by: Alfred W. Benson

Personal details
- Born: April 10, 1848 Canton, Missouri, U.S.
- Died: July 28, 1907 (aged 59) Battle Creek, Michigan, U.S.
- Education: Canton Missouri Academy

Adrian Lawrence Greene (April 10, 1848 – July 28, 1907) was a justice of the Kansas Supreme Court from January 15, 1901, to July 28, 1907.

== Early life ==
Greene was born April 10, 1848, in Canton, Missouri, to Joel R. and Rosa Ann (née Black) Greene. He moved with his parents in 1865 to Saline County, Missouri, where he farmed for five years with his father.

== Law career ==
Greene was educated in the common schools of Canton and began reading law in 1870. He was admitted to the Missouri Bar in 1871 and practiced for eight months in Miami, Missouri, before moving to Newton, Kansas, in September 1871.

In 1882, Greene was elected county attorney for Harvey County, Kansas. He served for six years (two and one-half terms) as county attorney before resigning. During his service, Greene worked diligently to break up illegal alcohol traffic in Harvey County. Although he never held political office again until being appointed to the Kansas Supreme Court, Greene was very active in Republican Party politics both at the county and state levels. In 1886 and 1887 he was a member of the Republican state executive committee, and in 1895 and 1896 he was a member of the Republican state central committee.

When the Kansas Supreme Court was expanded by a state constitutional amendment in 1900, Greene was appointed a justice by Governor William E. Stanley. He was nominated by the Republican Party in 1902 for a second term to the Kansas Supreme Court and won a seat on the court that he would have held until 1909.

== Personal life ==
Greene first married Anna E. Baker (1851-1885) on February 2, 1876; they had one daughter, Gertrude (b. 1877). He then married Elizabeth Sarah Thurston (1865-1921) in 1890 and they had two children: Winifred Elizabeth (b. 1892) and Adrian Lawrence Jr. (b. 1896).

== Death ==
Two weeks before his death, Greene was taken to Battle Creek, Michigan, after suffering for many years with acute kidney pain. He died there on July 28, 1907, and is buried Greenwood Cemetery in Newton.

Political offices
Preceded by Newly created seat	Justice of the Kansas Supreme Court; 1901–1907	Succeeded by Alfred W. Benson
