= James Reed Hallowell =

American politician (1841–1898)

James Hallowell
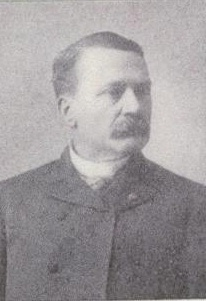

Personal details
- Born: James Reed Hallowell; December 27, 1841 Montgomery County, Pennsylvania, U.S.
- Died: June 24, 1898 (aged 56) Crawfordsville, Indiana, U.S.
- Party: Republican
- Education: DePauw University

James Reed Hallowell (December 27, 1841 – June 24, 1898) was a prominent Kansan, politician and railroad-businessman. Hallowell unsuccessfully ran for Congress in 1890, losing to Populist Jerry Simpson. He was known throughout the West by the soubriquet "Prince Hal", and for a variety of comments made by Simpson about Hallowell's "silk socks".

== Personal life ==
Col. Hallowell was born to a well-established Quaker family in Montgomery County, Pennsylvania. When he was young, Hallowell came to Parke County, Indiana where his father was engaged in the milling business. As a boy he was self-helping, enterprising, and was a student at DePauw University when the American Civil War broke out.

Hallowell married Semantha Montgomery (1848–1930), the daughter of Issac Harrod Montgomery of Linden. His only son, Montgomery Hallowell, practiced law in Chicago.

== Politics ==
Hallowell served in the Kansas House of Representatives in 1876 and then served in the Kansas State Senate 1877 and 1879. He won election to the United States House of Representatives in 1878 as a Republican, but Congress refused to seat him, because Kansas was only entitled to three seats in the House.

== Silk socks controversy ==
In 1890, Republicans issued opposing Populist leader Jerry Simpson a debating challenge. Hallowell, the Republican candidate, was one of the most popular men and the best speaker in the state. During the debate, Simpson famously characterized Hallowell as an elitist. He later wrote, "When my turn came I tried to get hold of the crowd. I referred to the fact that my opponent was known as a 'Prince.' Princes, I said, wear silk socks. I don't wear any." According to historian O. Gene Clanton, Simpson "won the respect and admiration of his colleagues in the House, regardless of party," and his performance in Congress "was, from beginning to end, principled, consistent, and commendable".

Simpson's comments quickly gained national attention, with many stories in explanation of the comments varying. Louis F. Post of The Public: A Journal of Democracy wrote that "many absurd stories in explanation of this epithet have been told in print. The true one, also, has often been told. The term "silk stocking" had been applied by the Populists to the Republicans. Alluding to this in his debate, Simpson said in substance: "Mr. Hallowell talks for silk stocking folks, but I am talking for farmers, and they've been made so poor by silk stocking laws that they can't afford even socks".

During one alleged encounter, Simpson mocked Hallowell's fine clothes and silk stockings, to which Prince Hal wrinkled his nose and said silk was preferable to dirty men who wore no socks at all. From that point forward Simpson campaigned as "Sockless Jerry," spinning his lack of hosiery into the elusive political gold of authenticity.

The Topeka Capital-Journal described the race as one pitting sober adults against a childish mob. "The opposing candidates are opposites in every way. Colonel Hallowell is a brilliant, experienced and competent man who would add strength to the Kansas delegation; Jerry Simpson is an ignorant, inexperienced lunkhead … who would disgrace the state in congress; scarcely able to read and write, unacquainted with public affairs, without experience as a legislator, raw, boorish, [and] fanatical with the fanaticism of sheer ignorance".

The editor of The Wichita Eagle, a few weeks after the election wrote "we expected our man to wipe the floor with Simpson, but Simpson wiped the floor with our man".

== Death and legacy ==
Hallowell died in Crawfordsville, Montgomery County, Indiana, June 24, 1898 of complications relating to consumption.

The funeral of Col. James R. Hallowell occurred on a Sunday afternoon in the residence of Mrs. Laura Doubleday on West Main Street, and the service was attended by a large number of citizens and soldiers from Pennsylvania, Kansas, and Indiana. The G.A.R carried out the service, and the funeral was conducted by Chaplain J. B. Hamilton, of Bloomington, who was chaplain of the 31st regiment.

He is the namesake of Hallowell, Kansas.

== See also ==
- List of United States representatives-elect who never took their seats
