= Samuel R. Peters =

American lawyer, editor, and politician (1842–1910)

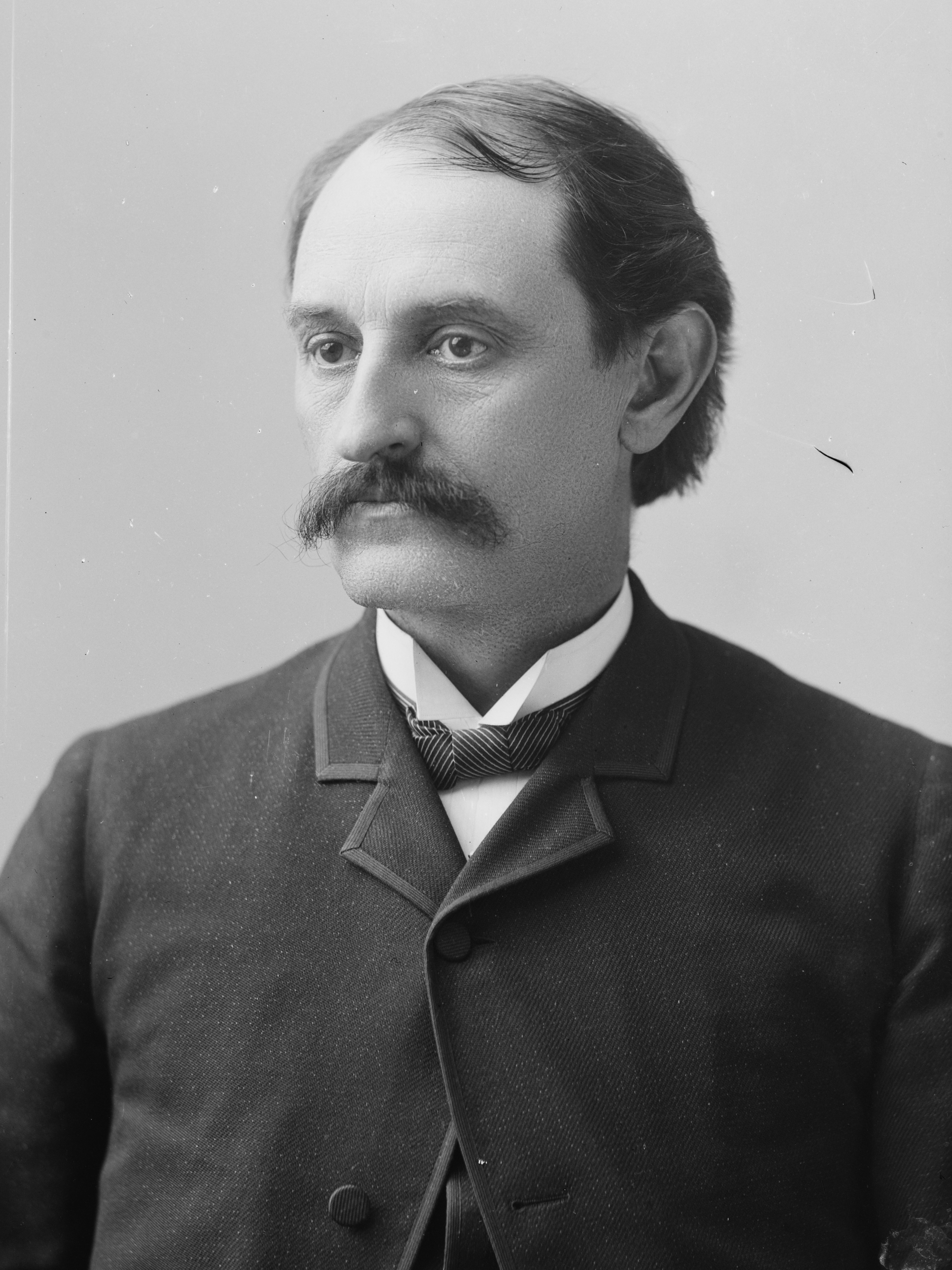
- Peters c. 1873–1890

Member of the U.S. House of Representatives from Kansas
- In office March 4, 1883 – March 3, 1891
- Preceded by: District established
- Succeeded by: Jerry Simpson
- Constituency: At-large district (1883–1885); 7th district (1885–1891)

Personal details
- Born: Samuel Ritter Peters; August 16, 1842 Walnut Township, Pickaway County, Ohio
- Died: April 21, 1910 (aged 67) Newton, Kansas
- Party: Republican

Military service
- Allegiance: United States of America
- Branch/service: Union Army
- Rank: Captain
- Unit: Company E, 73rd Regiment, Ohio Volunteer Infantry
- Battles/wars: Civil War

Samuel Ritter Peters (August 16, 1842 – April 21, 1910) was a lawyer, newspaper editor, and U.S. Representative from Kansas.

Born in Walnut Township, near Circleville, Ohio, Peters attended the common schools and the Ohio Wesleyan University at Delaware. Enlisted in the Union Army as a private in Company E, Seventy-third Regiment, Ohio Volunteer Infantry, in October 1861 and was mustered out in June 1865, having held successively the ranks of sergeant, second lieutenant, first lieutenant, and captain. He was graduated in law from the University of Michigan at Ann Arbor in 1867. He was admitted to the bar the same year and commenced practice in Memphis, Missouri. He was editor of the Memphis Reveille from 1868 to 1873. He served as delegate to the Republican National Convention in 1872. He served as mayor of Memphis in 1873. He moved to Marion, Kansas, in 1873 and resumed the practice of law.

Peters was elected a member of the Kansas State Senate in 1874 and served until his resignation in March 1875. He was appointed and subsequently elected judge of the ninth judicial district and served from 1875 until 1883, when he resigned. He moved to Newton, Kansas, in 1876.

Peters was elected as a Republican to the Forty-eighth and to the three succeeding Congresses (March 4, 1883 – March 3, 1891). He was not a candidate for renomination in 1890. He resumed the practice of law in Newton. He served as member of the board of managers of the State reformatory 1895-1899. Postmaster of Newton 1898-1910. He was editor of the Newton Daily Kansas-Republican in 1899. He died in Newton, Kansas on April 21, 1910. He was interred in Greenwood Cemetery.

U.S. House of Representatives
| Preceded by Seat created | Member of the U.S. House of Representatives from Kansas's at-large congressional district 1883–1885 | Succeeded by Seat eliminated |
| Preceded by District created | Member of the U.S. House of Representatives from Kansas's 7th congressional district 1885–1891 | Succeeded by Jerry Simpson |
