= Jerry Simpson =

American politician (1842–1905)

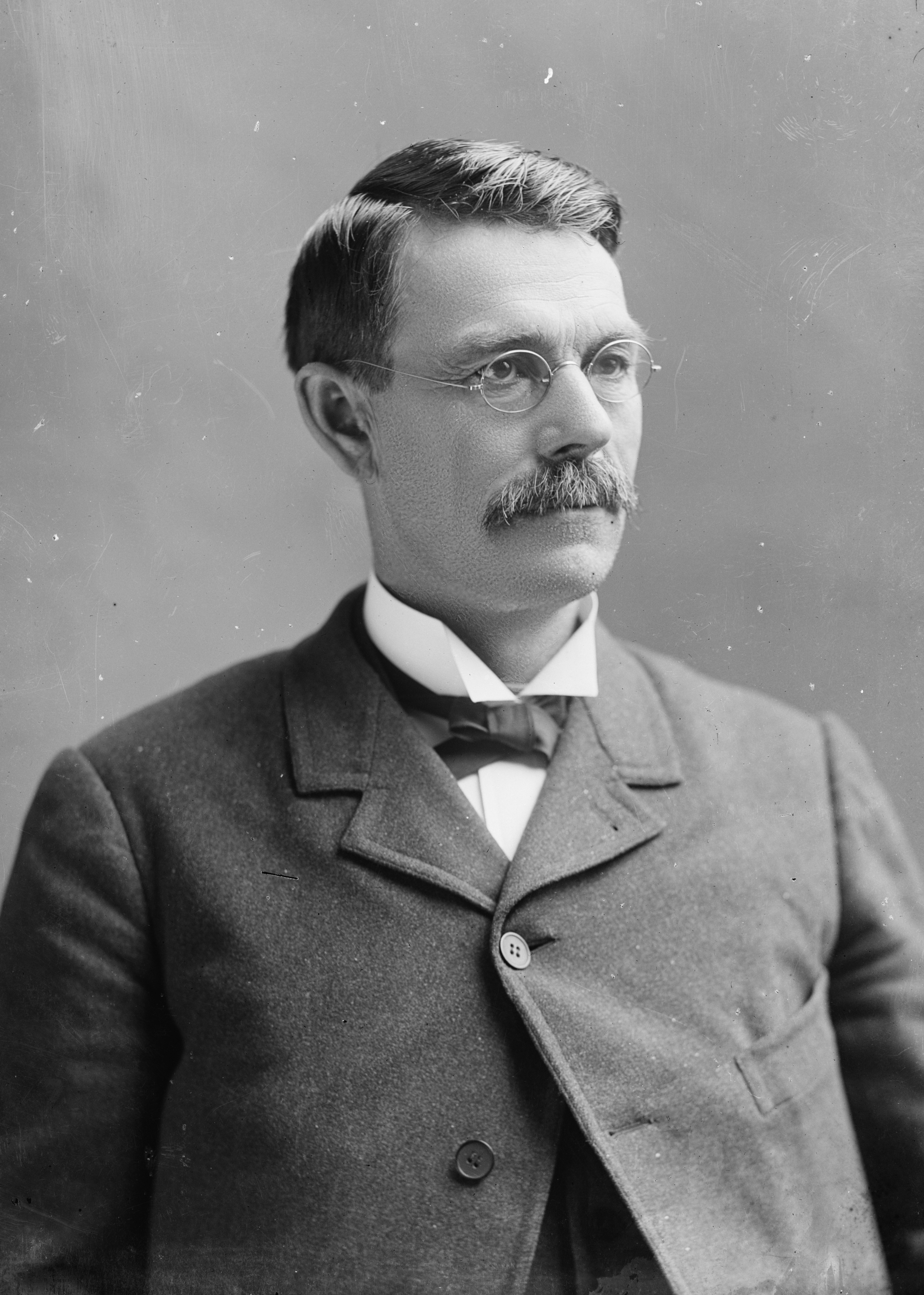
- Portrait by C. M. Bell c. 1891–1894

Member of the U.S. House of Representatives from Kansas's 7th district
- In office March 4, 1897 – March 3, 1899
- Preceded by: Chester I. Long
- Succeeded by: Chester I. Long
- In office March 4, 1891 – March 3, 1895
- Preceded by: Samuel R. Peters
- Succeeded by: Chester I. Long

Personal details
- Born: March 31, 1842 Prince Edward Island, Canada
- Died: October 23, 1905 (aged 63) Wichita, Kansas
- Party: Populist

Jeremiah Simpson (March 31, 1842 – October 23, 1905), nicknamed "Sockless Jerry" Simpson, was an American politician from the U.S. state of Kansas. An old-style populist, he was elected to the United States House of Representatives three times. He was a Georgist and former greenbacker.

== Early life ==
Born in Prince Edward Island, Canada, Simpson moved with his family to Oneida County, New York when he was six. Although he did poorly in school, he was very intelligent and a voracious reader. During the Civil War, he served in the Illinois Volunteer Infantry, but was discharged for medical reasons.

After the war, Simpson moved to Indiana, where he signed on as a deckhand on a steamship that traversed the Great Lakes. By the time he had risen to the position of captain, he had married and started a family. Deciding to live a more stationary life, he moved to Jackson County, Kansas and bought himself a farm.

== Political career ==
He married in 1870. In the late 1870s, a combination of hard times for farming in general and the death of his child in a sawmill accident drove Simpson to move south, to Barber County, Kansas, where he bought a ranch and a herd of cattle.

In late 1883 and early 1884, a long, hard winter killed his entire herd, and Simpson was reduced to working as the town marshal in Medicine Lodge, Kansas. It was during this time that Simpson, angry at his plight, first involved himself in politics, becoming an organizer for the Union Labor Party, a local offshoot of the defunct Greenback Party (of which he had been a member). He ran as their candidate for the state legislature in 1886 and 1888, but was defeated by T. A. McNeal of the state's dominant Republican Party.

In 1889, the price of corn, the state's principal crop, dropped precipitously, and it was burned as fuel all across Kansas. Seizing the moment, remnants of the Farmers' Alliance organized into the People's Party, and Simpson joined on. At the convention of the Kansas People's Party, Simpson was easily nominated as the Party's candidate for Congress.

Simpson's Republican opponent was Colonel James Reed Hallowell, often referred to as "Prince Hal", an attorney for a railroad who campaigned from the back of a private rail car. Simpson, campaigning on a populist platform of public ownership of railroads, a graduated income tax, the abolition of national banks, and universal suffrage, denounced Hallowell as a pampered scion of wealth, a Prince whose feet were "encased in fine silk hosiery." Hallowell fired back that having silk socks was better than having none at all. With the help of populist campaigner Mary Elizabeth Lease, Simpson won a new nickname, "Sockless Jerry," and an 8,000-vote margin of victory in the race.

=== U.S. Congress ===
In Congress, Simpson was a forceful advocate for populist causes and became nationally known as the party's congressional leader. In 1894, he was one of six congressmen to vote in favor of a single tax amendment to the Wilson–Gorman Tariff Act. Proposed by Democrat and fellow Georgist James G. Maguire of California, it was intended as a substitute for the bill's proposed income tax. It would have levied a direct tax of $31,311,125 on land values nationwide. After this was rejected, Simpson voted in favor of the original version of the bill, but did not vote on the final version sent back by the Senate several months later. While in Congress, Simpson was mocked for his inability to spell, which is theorized to have been a possible case of dyslexia.

In 1892, he was re-elected by a slim 2,000-vote majority, running slightly behind James Weaver, the party's presidential nominee, who had also managed to seize the Democratic ballot line in Kansas. By 1894, however, the party's fortunes had already started to wane, and he was turned out of office in favor of Republican Chester I. Long in a close race. Undaunted, Simpson returned in 1896, running hard against Long and upsetting him to win back his House seat. It didn't last, however, and Long defeated him once again in the election of 1898.

== Later life and death ==
Deciding that he had lost his taste for farming, Simpson moved to New Mexico and took up real estate. A few years later, he suffered a debilitating brain aneurysm. Realizing that he probably didn't have much time left, he boarded a train back to Kansas. He died in a Wichita hospital on October 23, 1905. He is interred in Maple Grove Cemetery, Wichita.

U.S. House of Representatives
Preceded by Samuel R. Peters	Member of the U.S. House of Representatives from Kansas's 7th congressional district 1891 – 1895	Succeeded by Chester I. Long
Preceded by Chester I. Long	Member of the U.S. House of Representatives from Kansas's 7th congressional district 1897 – 1899	Succeeded by Chester I. Long
