= Chester I. Long =

American politician (1860–1934)

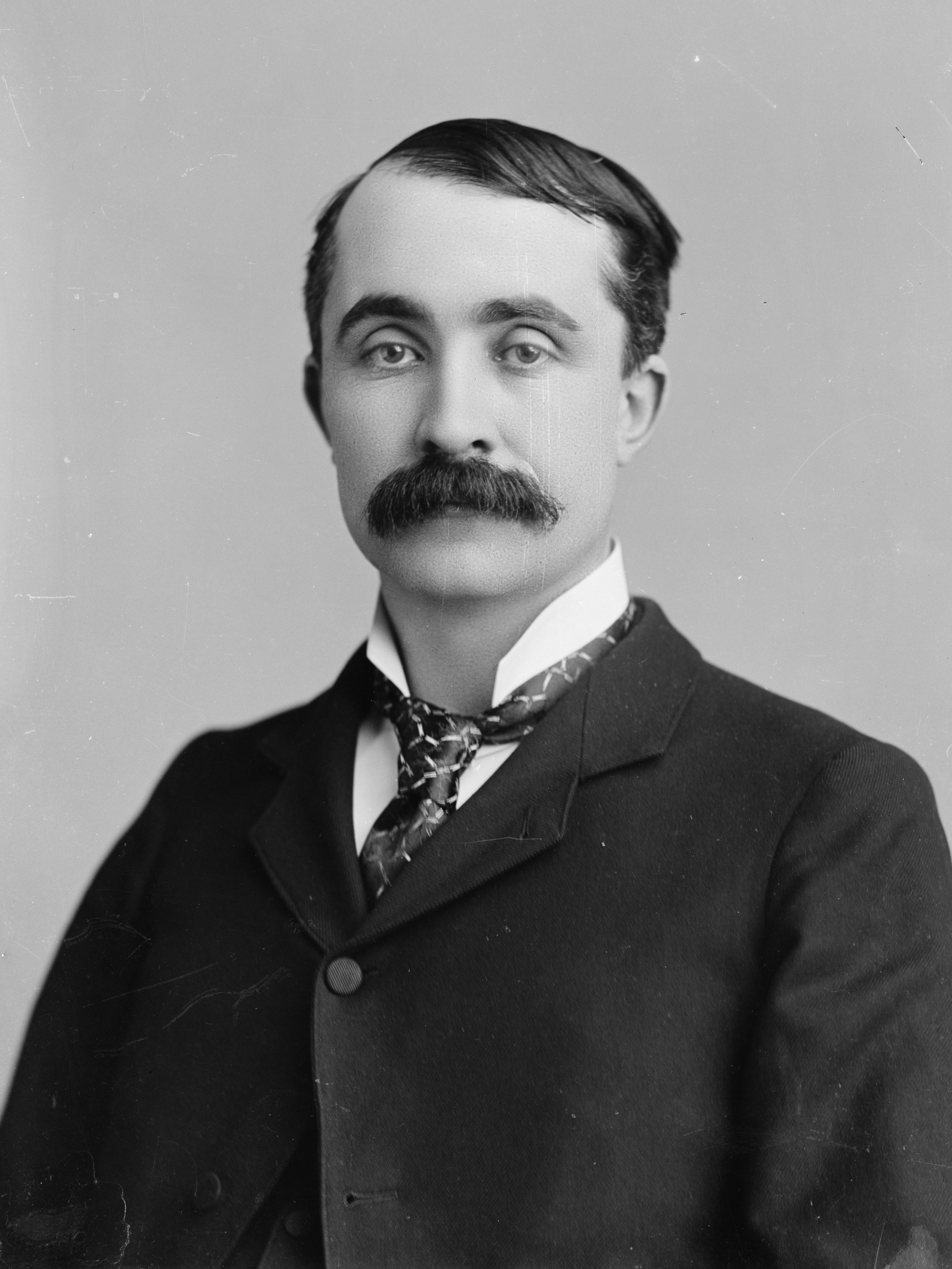
- Long, 1894–1901

United States Senator from Kansas
- In office March 4, 1903 – March 3, 1909
- Preceded by: William A. Harris
- Succeeded by: Joseph L. Bristow

Member of the U.S. House of Representatives from Kansas's 7th district
- In office March 4, 1899 – March 4, 1903
- Preceded by: Jerry Simpson
- Succeeded by: Victor Murdock

Member of the U.S. House of Representatives from Kansas's 7th district
- In office March 4, 1895 – March 3, 1897
- Preceded by: Jerry Simpson
- Succeeded by: Jerry Simpson

Member of the Kansas Senate
- In office 1889–1893

Personal details
- Born: Chester Isaiah Long; October 12, 1860 Millerstown, Pennsylvania
- Died: July 1, 1934 (aged 73) Washington, D.C.
- Party: Republican

Chester Isaiah Long (October 12, 1860 – July 1, 1934) was a United States representative and Senator from Kansas. Born in Greenwood Township, Pennsylvania, he moved with his parents to Daviess County, Missouri, in 1865 and to Paola, Kansas, in 1879. He attended the country schools and graduated from the normal school at Paola in 1880. He taught school for several years, studied law, and was admitted to the bar in 1885, commencing practice in Medicine Lodge, Kansas.

He was a member of the Kansas Senate from 1889 to 1893 and was an unsuccessful candidate for election in 1892 to the Fifty-third Congress. He was elected as a Republican to the Fifty-fourth Congress, serving from March 4, 1895, to March 3, 1897; he was an unsuccessful candidate for reelection in 1896 to the Fifty-fifth Congress, but was elected to the Fifty-sixth, Fifty-seventh, and Fifty-eighth Congresses and served from March 4, 1899, until his resignation, effective March 4, 1903, before the commencement of the Fifty-eighth Congress, to become Senator. He was elected to the U.S. Senate and served from March 4, 1903, to March 3, 1909; he was an unsuccessful candidate for renomination in 1908.

While in the Senate, he was chairman of the Committee on the University of the United States (Fifty-eighth and Fifty-ninth Congresses) and a member of the Committee on the Census (Fifty-ninth and Sixtieth Congresses).

He moved to Wichita in 1911 and continued the practice of law, and was chairman of the commission to revise the general statutes of Kansas from 1921 to 1923. He moved to Washington, D.C., in 1925 and continued the practice of law, and from 1925 to 1926 was the president of the American Bar Association. He died in Washington in 1934; interment was in Old Mission Cemetery, Wichita.

U.S. Senate
Preceded by William A. Harris	U.S. senator (Class 3) from Kansas; 1903–1909; Served alongside: Joseph R. Burton, Alfred W. Benson, Charles Curtis	Succeeded by Joseph L. Bristow
U.S. House of Representatives
Preceded by Jerry Simpson	Member of the U.S. House of Representatives from Kansas's 7th congressional district 1895 – 1897	Succeeded by Jerry Simpson
Preceded by Jerry Simpson	Member of the U.S. House of Representatives from Kansas's 7th congressional district 1899 – 1903	Succeeded by Victor Murdock
