= Kansas's 7th congressional district =

Former U.S. House district from 1883 to 1943

- Obsolete district
- Created: 1885
- Eliminated: 1943
- Years active: 1885-1943

Kansas's 7th congressional district for the United States House of Representatives in the state of Kansas was a congressional district until its elimination in 1943.

== List of members representing the district ==
Member (Residence)	Party	Term	Cong ress	Electoral history
District created March 4, 1885
Samuel R. Peters (Newton)	Republican	March 4, 1885 – March 3, 1891	49th 50th 51st	Redistricted from the at-large district and re-elected in 1884. Re-elected in 1886. Re-elected in 1888. Retired.
Jerry Simpson (Medicine Lodge)	Populist	March 4, 1891 – March 3, 1895	52nd 53rd	Elected in 1890. Re-elected in 1892. Lost re-election.
Chester I. Long (Medicine Lodge)	Republican	March 4, 1895 – March 3, 1897	54th	Elected in 1894. Lost re-election.
Jerry Simpson (Medicine Lodge)	Populist	March 4, 1897 – March 3, 1899	55th	Elected in 1896. Lost re-election.
Chester I. Long (Medicine Lodge)	Republican	March 4, 1899 – March 3, 1903	56th 57th	Elected in 1898. Re-elected in 1900. Re-elected in 1902 but resigned when elected to the US Senate.
Vacant		March 4, 1903 – May 26, 1903	58th	
Victor Murdock (Wichita)	Republican	May 26, 1903 – March 3, 1907	58th 59th	Elected to finish Long's term. Re-elected in 1904. Redistricted to the 8th district.
Edmond H. Madison (Dodge City)	Republican	March 4, 1907 – September 18, 1911	60th 61st 62nd	Elected in 1906. Re-elected in 1908. Re-elected in 1910. Died.
Vacant		September 18, 1911 – January 9, 1912	62nd	
George Neeley (Hutchinson)	Democratic	January 9, 1912 – March 3, 1915	62nd 63rd	Elected to finish Madison's term. Retired to run for U.S. senator.
Jouett Shouse (Kinsley)	Democratic	March 4, 1915 – March 3, 1919	64th 65th	Elected in 1914. Re-elected in 1916. Retired when appointed Assistant Secretary of the Treasury.
Jasper N. Tincher (Medicine Lodge)	Republican	March 4, 1919 – March 3, 1927	66th 67th 68th 69th	Elected in 1918. Re-elected in 1920. Re-elected in 1922. Re-elected in 1924. Retired.
Clifford R. Hope (Garden City)	Republican	March 4, 1927 – January 3, 1943	70th 71st 72nd 73rd 74th 75th 76th 77th	Elected in 1926; Re-elected in 1928. Re-elected in 1930. Re-elected in 1932. Re-elected in 1934. Re-elected in 1936. Re-elected in 1938. Re-elected in 1940. Redistricted to the 5th district.
District eliminated January 3, 1943
