= Florida Northern Railroad =

Florida Northern Railroad Company, Inc.
Overview
- Headquarters: Plymouth, Florida
- Reporting mark: FNOR
- Locale: Ocala, Florida
- Dates of operation: 1988–present

Technical
- Track gauge: 4 ft 8 1/2 in (1,435 mm) standard gauge

Other
- Website: Official website

The Florida Northern Railroad Company, Inc. (reporting mark FNOR) is one of several short line railroads run by Regional Rail, LLC. It has connections to CSX at Ocala, Florida, running north to Lowell, Florida, and south to Candler, Florida. It was formerly run by CSX as their Ocala Subdivision.

The railroad also operates lines connecting to CSX in Newberry, Florida, running south to the Crystal River Energy Complex in Red Level, Florida, just north of Crystal River. This line was formerly CSX's West Coast Subdivision and Red Level Subdivision. Long coal trains are still pulled by CSX locomotives on this branch while local traffic still uses the Pinsly Red with Yellow locomotives.

== History ==
=== Lowell to Candler Line ===
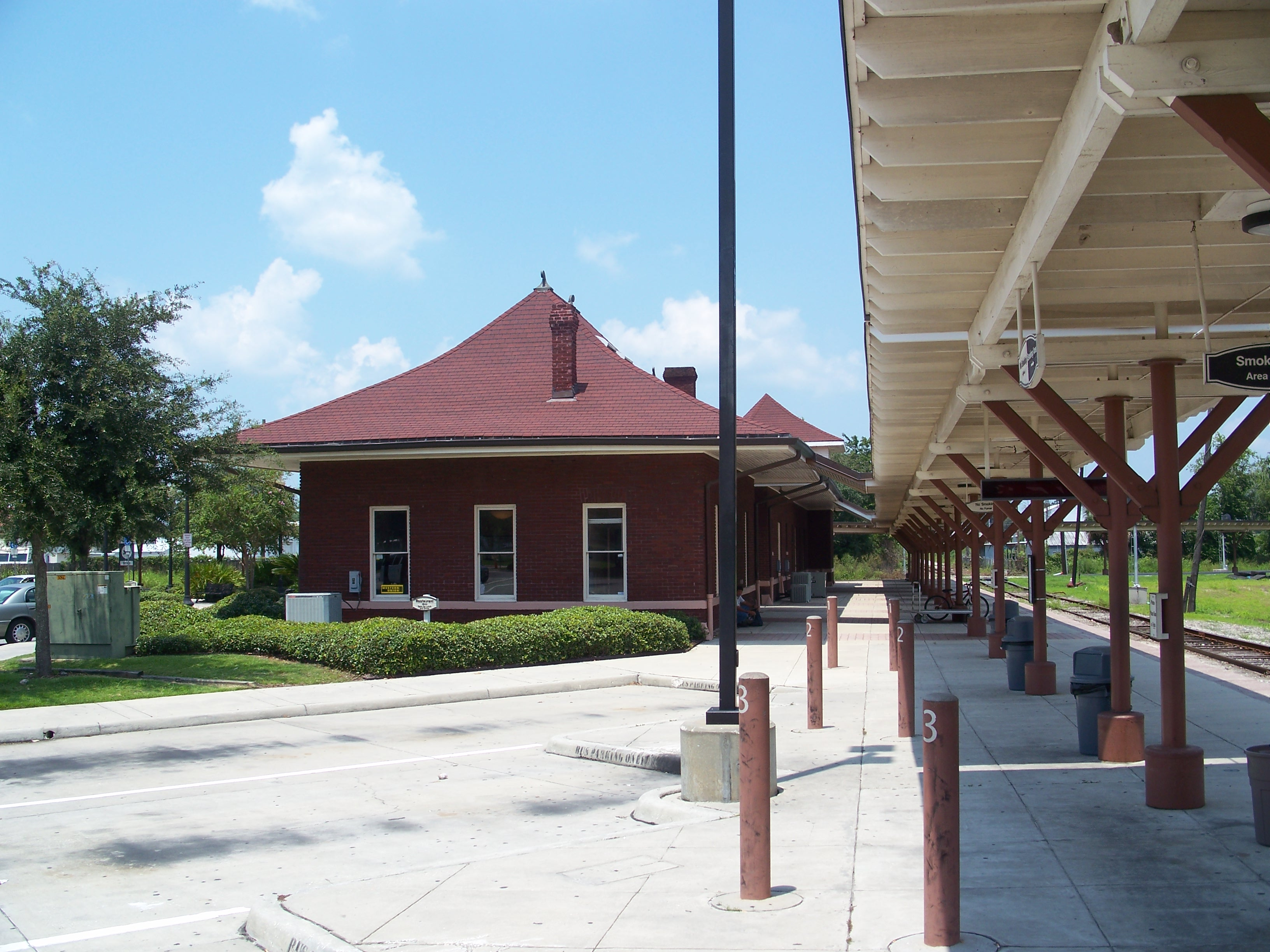
Ocala Union Station along the Florida Northern Railroad line

The main track of the line from Lowell to Candler via Ocala was originally built by the Florida Southern Railway, which was part of the Plant System of railroads. It was built from Rochelle (south of Gainesville) to Ocala in 1881. In 1883, it was extended south to Leesburg. The track connecting the Florida Northern main track with the CSX track and the industrial spur from Ocala west was originally part of the Silver Springs, Ocala and Gulf Railroad, which was built in 1887 and historically extended west to Dunnellon and Homosassa. The Silver Springs, Ocala and Gulf Railroad also became part of the Plant System.

The Plant System became part of the Atlantic Coast Line Railroad in 1902. The Atlantic Coast line used this line for passenger service and in 1917, they jointly built Ocala Union Station with the Seaboard Air Line Railroad where the two railroads crossed. Ocala Union Station no longer serves passenger trains but continues to stand where the Florida Northern crosses the CSX S Line (the former Seaboard Air Line).

The Atlantic Coast Line and Seaboard Air Line merged in 1967 with the merged company becoming the CSX Transportation in 1986. The former Atlantic Coast Line route was abandoned north of Lowell and south of Candler around 1982, creating the line that exists today. CSX leased the line to the Pinsly Railroad Company in 1988 who established the Florida Northern Railroad. In November 2019, Pinsly Railroad Company sold the Florida Northern, along with the Florida Central Railroad and Florida Midland Railroad, to 3i RR Holdings GP, LLC and subsidiaries (d.b.a. "Regional Rail, LLC").

As of 2016, the northernmost 5 miles from Zuber to Lowell are out of service.

=== Newberry to Red Level Line ===
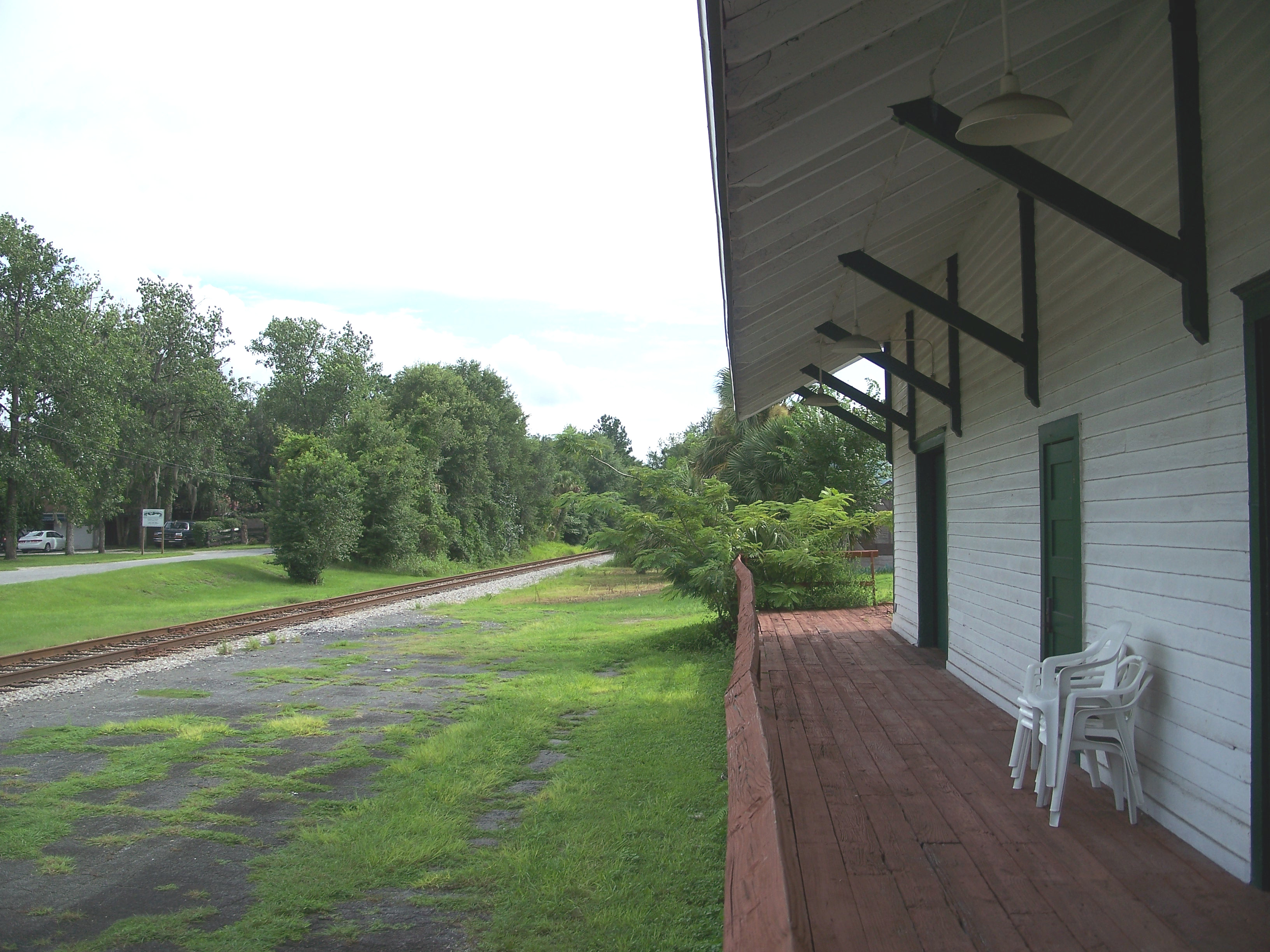
Newberry to Red Level Line as seen from the platform of the former Dunnellon station

The line from Newberry to Red Level was built incrementally by Henry Plant's system of railroads. Track from High Springs to Archer was built in 1893 by the Plant System as a branch of the Live Oak, Tampa and Charlotte Harbor Railroad.

At the other end, the Silver Springs, Ocala and Gulf Railroad (which originated in Ocala), built the track from a point historically known as Juliette (near Rainbow Springs) south to Dunnellon, Crystal River, and Homosassa in 1887 (though track to Homosassa only lasted until 1941). In 1893, track was built from Juliette (near Rainbow Springs) north to Morriston and from just south of Dunnellon south to Inverness. The split in the line to Inverness would become known as Gulf Junction.

One of the early organizers of the Silver Springs, Ocala and Gulf Railroad was John F. Dunn, for whom Dunnellon is named for. The Silver Springs, Ocala and Gulf Railroad would become part of the Plant System of railroads in 1901. The Plant System was acquired by the Atlantic Coast Line Railroad in 1902.

The Atlantic Coast Line then extended the line from Morriston north to Archer in 1913 to connect with the line from High Springs. The completion of this line created a through route from High Springs to Dunnellon, which combined with track to Inverness south created a west coast main line for the Atlantic Coast Line.

In the 1960s, a spur was built to the Crystal River Energy Complex in Red Level.

The Atlantic Coast Line Railroad eventually evolved into CSX in 1986, with this line being known as the West Coast Subdivision. The track from Red Level Junction to Crystal River was removed by 1982 and track from Dunnellon south to Inverness and Owensboro was removed in 1987, which became the Withlacoochee State Trail.

The Florida Northern took over the remaining track of the West Coast Subdivision in 2005. The spur from Newberry to High Springs was removed in 2014.

== See also ==
- List of United States railroads
- List of Florida railroads
