= Silver Springs, Ocala and Gulf Railroad =

Historic railroad in Florida

Overview
- Locale: Florida
- Dates of operation: 1887–1901
- Successor: Plant System; Atlantic Coast Line Railroad

Technical
- Track gauge: 4 ft 8 1/2 in (1,435 mm) standard gauge

The Silver Springs, Ocala and Gulf Railroad was a railroad running in northern Central Florida. Despite its name, it never directly served Silver Springs but instead ran from Ocala west to Dunnellon and to the Gulf of Mexico at Homosassa. It also had a track that served Inverness from Dunnellon.

== History ==
The Silver Springs, Ocala and Gulf Railroad was assigned land grants on March 12, 1879, by the state legislature of Florida. This was accomplished by Florida State Law Chapter 3170. The line was complete between Ocala and Dunellon in 1887 and used to transport phosphate and limestone. It connected with the Florida Southern Railway in Ocala. One of the early organizers of the railroad was John F. Dunn, for whom Dunnellon is partially named for.

The line was extended southwest to Crystal River and Homosassa by 1888. Track was then built from Dunnellon (at a point near Citrus Springs) south to Hernando and Inverness in 1891, which connected with the newly built northern extension of the South Florida Railroad's Pemberton Ferry Branch, which continued south to Lakeland. In 1893, track was built from Juliette (near Rainbow Springs) north to Morriston.

By 1901, the Silver Springs, Ocala and Gulf Railroad owned four locomotives. That year, the line became part of the Plant System, which also operated the South Florida Railroad and the Florida Southern Railway. The Plant System had been owned by Florida railroad tycoon Henry B. Plant prior to his death in 1899.

The Plant System was acquired by the Atlantic Coast Line Railroad in 1902. The Silver Springs, Ocala and Gulf network would later be incorporated into the Atlantic Coast Line's DuPont—Lakeland Line.

Track between Homosassa and Crystal River was abandoned in 1941. The Atlantic Coast Line became the Seaboard Coast Line Railroad in 1967 after merging with their rival, the Seaboard Air Line Railroad, which then became CSX Transportation in 1986. Track was removed between Crystal River and Red Level by 1982. CSX abandoned the line from Dunnellon to Inverness (along with track from Inverness to Owensboro) in 1987.

== Current conditions ==
All former track of the Silver Springs, Ocala and Gulf Railroad has been operated by the Florida Northern Railroad since 1988. This includes the now discontinuous segments in Ocala (which is now a short industrial spur) and track from Dunnellon to the Crystal River Energy Complex in Red Level.

State Road 40 runs close to the former right of way between Ocala and Dunnellon.

The line from Dunnellon south to Inverness is now part of the Withlacoochee State Trail, the longest rail trail in Florida.
