= Rainbow Springs (disambiguation) =

Rainbow Springs is a large artesian spring in Florida, United States.

Rainbow Springs may also refer to:

- Rainbow Springs State Park, surrounding the springs
- Rainbow Springs, Florida, the community surrounding the springs and the park
