= Edgar, Florida =

Coordinates: 29°35′42″N 81°57′02″W

- Unincorporated community
- Interactive map of Edgar, Florida
- Country: United States
- State: Florida
- County: Putnam
- Elevation: 89 ft (27 m)
- Time zone: UTC-5 (EST)
  - Summer (DST): UTC-4 (EDT)
- GNIS ID: 305624

Edgar is an unincorporated community in Putnam County, Florida, United States, located southwest of the town of Interlachen. Edgar is located along Putnam County Road 20A east of Crossley, Florida, and has a former Atlantic Coast Line Railroad spur (which was once the Florida Southern Railway) leading to what is today the CSX Wildwood Subdivision.
