= Indiana Eastern Railroad =

Overview
- Headquarters: Indiana
- Reporting mark: IERR
- Locale: Indiana and Ohio
- Dates of operation: 2005–present

Technical
- Track gauge: 4 ft 8 1/2 in (1,435 mm) standard gauge
- Length: 43.0 miles (69.2 km)

The Indiana Eastern Railroad (reporting mark IERR) is a short-line railroad in the states of Indiana and Ohio, operating a former Chesapeake & Ohio Railway line between Richmond, Indiana, and Fernald, Ohio. It began operations in 2005 as a subsidiary of the Respondek Railroad, and interchanges freight with CSX at Cottage Grove. Its business headquarters is in Indiana with its operations headquarters in Liberty, Indiana It is owned by Regional Rail.

== History ==
The trackage operated by the IERR was completed in 1904 by the Chicago, Cincinnati & Louisville Railroad as part of a Cincinnati-Chicago line. The Chesapeake & Ohio Railway of Indiana, a newly incorporated subsidiary of the Chesapeake & Ohio Railway (C&O), acquired the line at foreclosure sale in 1910. In 1978, the Chessie System, owner of the C&O and Baltimore & Ohio Railroad (B&O), closed the steep approach to downtown Cincinnati over Cheviot Hill in order to construct Queensgate Yard. Trains were rerouted to use the B&O's Indianapolis Subdivision via Hamilton, rejoining the C&O at Cottage Grove. The much flatter portion of the line between Cottage Grove and the Fernald Feed Materials Production Center was kept in service. In 2005, CSX, successor to the Chessie System, leased the line between Fernald and Richmond to the newly created Indiana Eastern Railroad, which began operations on August 29. In November 2023, it was purchased by Regional Rail.
