= Rainbow River =

River in Florida, United States

Coordinates: 29.047476°N 82.4581551°W

Course of the Rainbow River

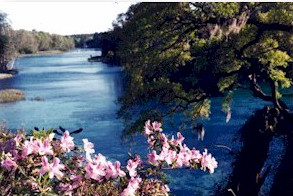
Rainbow Springs, at the head of the Rainbow River

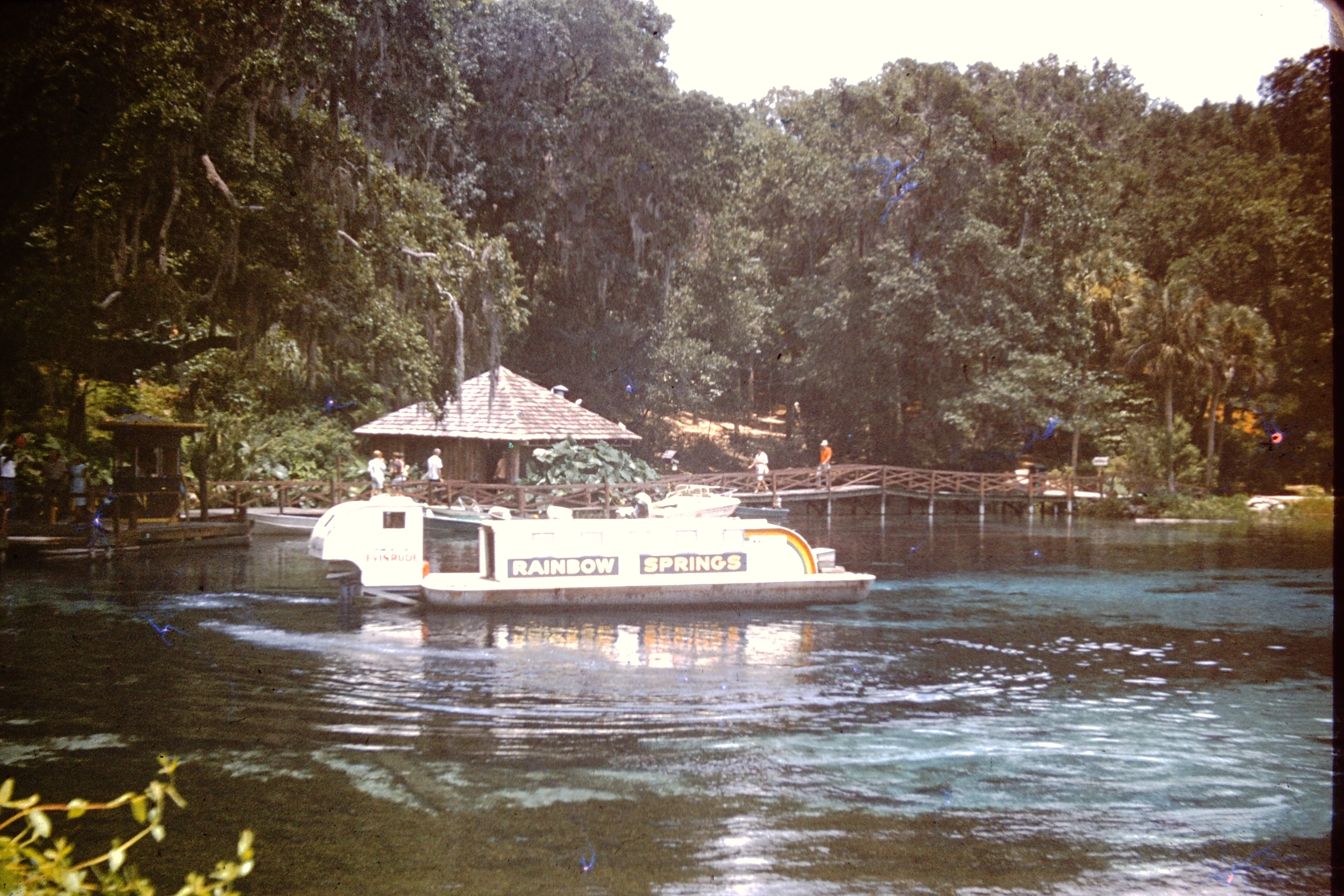
Rainbow Springs "submarine" sightseeing boat where passengers sat below the waterline looking out underwater windows around 1970

The Rainbow River is located in Dunnellon, Florida, United States, in the southwest corner of Marion County, about 20 miles (32 km) southwest of Ocala, 100 miles (160 km) northwest of Orlando and 100 miles (160 km) north of the Tampa Bay area. It is formed by a first-magnitude spring (Rainbow Springs) that is ranked fourth in the state for volume of discharge. In addition to the springs located at the headwaters, there are many smaller springs that discharge from numerous caves, rock crevices, and sand boils the entire length of the river.

The Rainbow River is a gently winding river that is 5.7 miles (9.2 km) long and merges with the Withlacoochee River at Dunnellon, Florida. The headwaters, Rainbow Springs, is the anchor for Rainbow Springs State Park. This first-magnitude spring is not one large vent but is numerous vents that issue 400 - 600 million gallons (1.5 to 2.3 million m³) of crystalline water every day. Rainbow Springs State Park is a popular destination to swim, snorkel, canoe, picnic, or stroll on the walking paths to enjoy the many plants and animals that abound here.

Once named Wekiwa Creek, Blue Spring, and Blue Run, archaeological evidence indicates that the waters of the Rainbow River have attracted and sustained human inhabitants for over 10,000 years. The crystal clear water, abundant with fish, wildlife and vegetation along with the constant water temperature of 72 degrees Fahrenheit (22 °C), has attracted a number of modern-day activities.

Rainbow Springs and the Rainbow River became popular in the late 1880s when hard rock phosphate was discovered in the area. A small community called Juliette flourished near the springs during this "boomtown" era. In the 1930s the spring was developed as a tourist attraction. Sea walls, a lodge, gift shop, the waterfalls, and a reptile exhibit were developed. Under new ownership, the real heyday for the attraction occurred in the 1960s. During that time activity greatly increased with glass-bottomed boat rides, riverboat rides, log raft rides, a gift shop and cafe, an aviary, a leaf-shaped gondola/monorail system, a horse rodeo, and submarine boat tours. Not faring well when traffic began using I-75 instead of U.S. Highway 41, with many tourists heading to a new attraction called Walt Disney World, the attraction closed in 1974.

The Rainbow River was designated as a Registered Natural Landmark in 1972, an Aquatic Preserve in 1986, and an "Outstanding Florida Waterway" in 1987 because of its outstanding beauty and aesthetics. The state purchased the original area that was the Rainbow Springs attraction in 1990. Volunteers cleared the overgrown park and opened the park on weekends to the public. The Florida Park Service officially opened Rainbow Springs State Park on a full-time basis on March 9, 1995.

Rainbow Springs State Park comprises 1,459.07 acres (590.46 ha) of upland (which includes around 100 acres (0.40 km^{2}) of wetlands) and 12.83 acres (5.19 ha) that are submerged. The most significant natural feature is the first-magnitude headspring basin which produces between 400 - 600 million gallons (1.5 to 2.3 million m³) of fresh water per day, forming the Rainbow River. The looking-glass waters of Rainbow Springs come from several vents, not one large bubbling spring. The river itself supports a wide variety of fish, wildlife, and plants, many within easy viewing by visitors. In total, the park contains 11 distinct natural communities, including sandhills, flatwoods, upland mixed forests, and hydric hammocks. Visitors are able to see a variety of wildflowers in season; oak, longleaf pines, magnolia, dogwood, redbud, and hickory trees; gray squirrels, red-shoulder hawks, swallowtail kites, barred owls, whitetail deer, and a wide variety of wading birds. The relative peace and quiet of the winter season offers much for the nature enthusiast. There is an interpretive room located in the visitor center displaying historical, natural, and cultural resources of the park.

== See also ==
- Rainbow Springs
