= Florida Southern Railway =

Historic railroad in Florida

- Interactive map of Florida Southern Railway lines (red). The South Florida Railroad's Pemberton Ferry Branch (blue) connected the two segments.

Overview
- Locale: Florida
- Dates of operation: 1881–1903
- Successor: Atlantic Coast Line Railroad

Technical
- Track gauge: 4 ft 8 1/2 in (1,435 mm) standard gauge
- Previous gauge: originally 3 ft (914 mm) gauge

The Florida Southern Railway was a railway that operated in Florida in the late 1800s. It was one of Florida's three notable narrow gauge railways when it was built along with the South Florida Railway and the Orange Belt Railway. The Florida Southern was originally chartered to run from Lake City south through central Florida to Charlotte Harbor. However, with the influence of Henry B. Plant, it operated with two discontinuous segments that would be part of the Plant System, which would later become part of the Atlantic Coast Line Railway.

== History ==
=== Original Charter ===
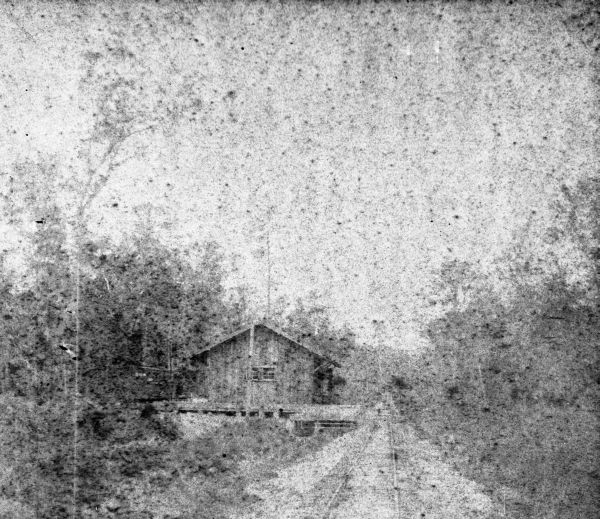
Micanopy station

The Florida Southern Railway was first chartered as the Gainesville, Ocala, and Charlotte Harbor Railroad in 1879, with a planned route from Lake City to Charlotte Harbor with a branch to Palatka to connect with steamboats on the St. Johns River. The name was then changed to the Florida Southern Railway in 1881.

The first segment of the line opened on August 21, 1881, from Gainesville to Rochelle along with the branch from Rochelle to Palatka. In Palatka, a roundhouse with a turntable was built as well as a wharf in the St. Johns River.

The main line was then extended from Rochelle to Ocala by the end of 1881. A branch to Micanopy was also included. By 1883, the southern end of the main line reached Leesburg, and construction began at the northern end to extended the line from Gainesville to Hague.

=== Henry Plant’s involvement ===
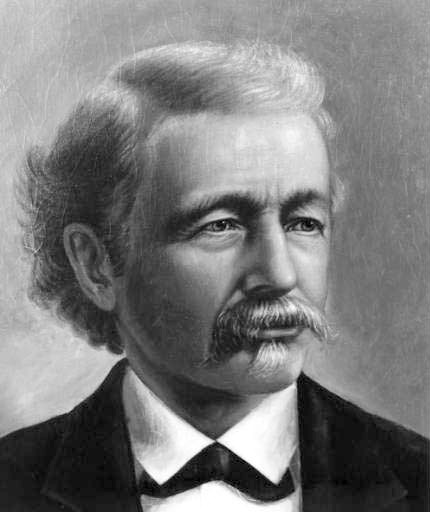
Henry B. Plant

In 1883, Henry B. Plant was in the midst of building his own system of railroads south from Du Pont, Georgia to Live Oak, Florida and south to Charlotte Harbor with plans to build in a similar path. Construction was underway on the Live Oak, Tampa and Charlotte Harbor Railroad when he learned of the Florida Southern's plans. Plant then sought to buy the Florida Southern but was unsuccessful. Despite this, he did manage to make a mutually beneficial agreement with the Florida Southern to avoid having two competing lines. In the agreement, Plant would not build the Live Oak, Tampa and Charlotte Harbor Railroad, past Gainesville. He bought the Florida Southern's unfinished line and charter north of Gainesville and completed it as part of his line.

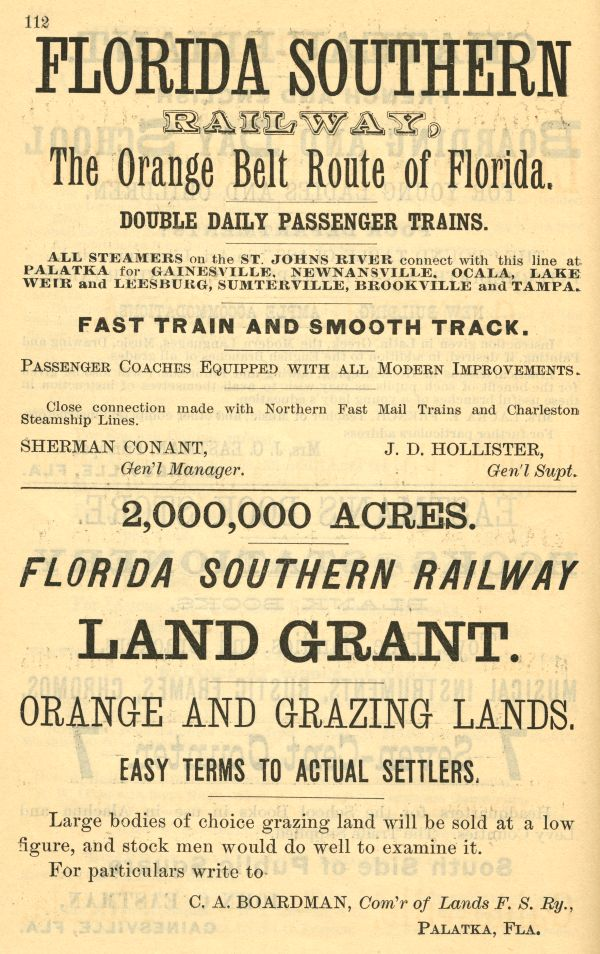
Florida Southern Railway brochure

The Florida Southern would then operate the combined network from Gainesville south to Pemberton Ferry where it would connect with a branch of the South Florida Railroad, another railroad Plant was involved with. The South Florida Railroad's Pemberton Ferry branch would then operate from Pemberton Ferry south to Lakeland, where it would cross and briefly join the South Florida Railroad's main line, and then turn south to Bartow. In Bartow, the Florida Southern would resume and finish the route south to Charlotte Harbor. This would also benefit the South Florida Railroad since it did not yet have any rail connection with the rest of the Plant System.

The Florida Southern Railway reached Leesburg by 1883, where it connected with the St. Johns and Lake Eustis Railway, which extended east towards Tavares, Altoona, and Astor. The Florida Southern later leased this branch line.

The Florida Southern Railway reached Pemberton Ferry (known today as Croom) by 1884 and would be extended west from there to Brooksville in January 1885.

Construction began on the southern segment of the line, known as the Charlotte Harbor Division, in September 1885 from Bartow along the Peace River (where large deposits of valuable phosphate was discovered in 1881) to Arcadia and Charlotte Harbor. The Charlotte Harbor Division was initially intended to terminate on the north side of Charlotte Harbor at a location known as Hickory Bluff (just southeast of Port Charlotte). However, just across the harbor from Hickory Bluff was a small town being planned by a man named Isaac Trabue. Trabue owned waterfront property and successfully convinced the Florida Southern to instead run the railroad to his planned town, which would become Punta Gorda. Trabue offered half of his land holdings to the Florida Southern in exchange for the railroad coming to his town. Surveying work to determine the route for the Charlotte Harbor Division was accomplished by local civil engineer Albert W. Gilchrist, who would later serve as Florida's 20th governor. The Charlotte Harbor Division was completed with its first train to Punta Gorda (initially known as Trabue) on July 24, 1886. Plant would go on to open a hotel in Punta Gorda in 1896. This hotel, the Hotel Punta Gorda, would later be owned by Barron Collier (the namesake of nearby Collier County).

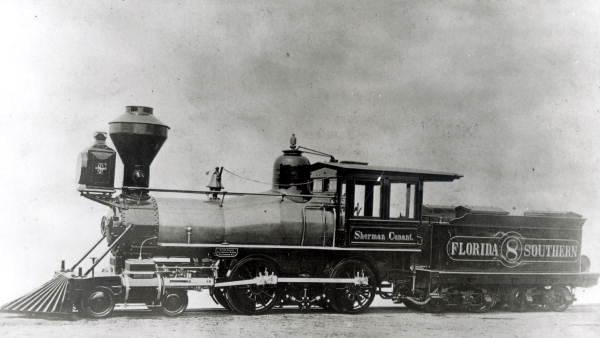
Florida Southern steam locomotive

The Florida Southern Railway went into receivership in 1890, though the Charlotte Harbor Division was operated independently through the receivership. It came out of receivership in 1892 and was reorganized as the Florida Southern Railroad. The Charlotte Harbor Division was converted to standard gauge in 1892.

The Florida Southern was fully absorbed into the Plant System in 1896, which was then sold to the Atlantic Coast Line Railroad in 1902. The Atlantic Coast Line continued to operate the Florida Southern lines and also rebuilt many of the original wooden stations along the lines with brick stations up until the 1920s.

The Atlantic Coast Line became the Seaboard Coast Line Railroad in 1967 after merging with their former rival, the Seaboard Air Line Railroad. In 1980, the Seaboard Coast Line's parent company merged with the Chessie System, creating the CSX Corporation. The CSX Corporation initially operated the Chessie and Seaboard Systems separately until 1986, when they were merged into CSX Transportation.

== Lines ==
=== Gainesville to Brooksville ===
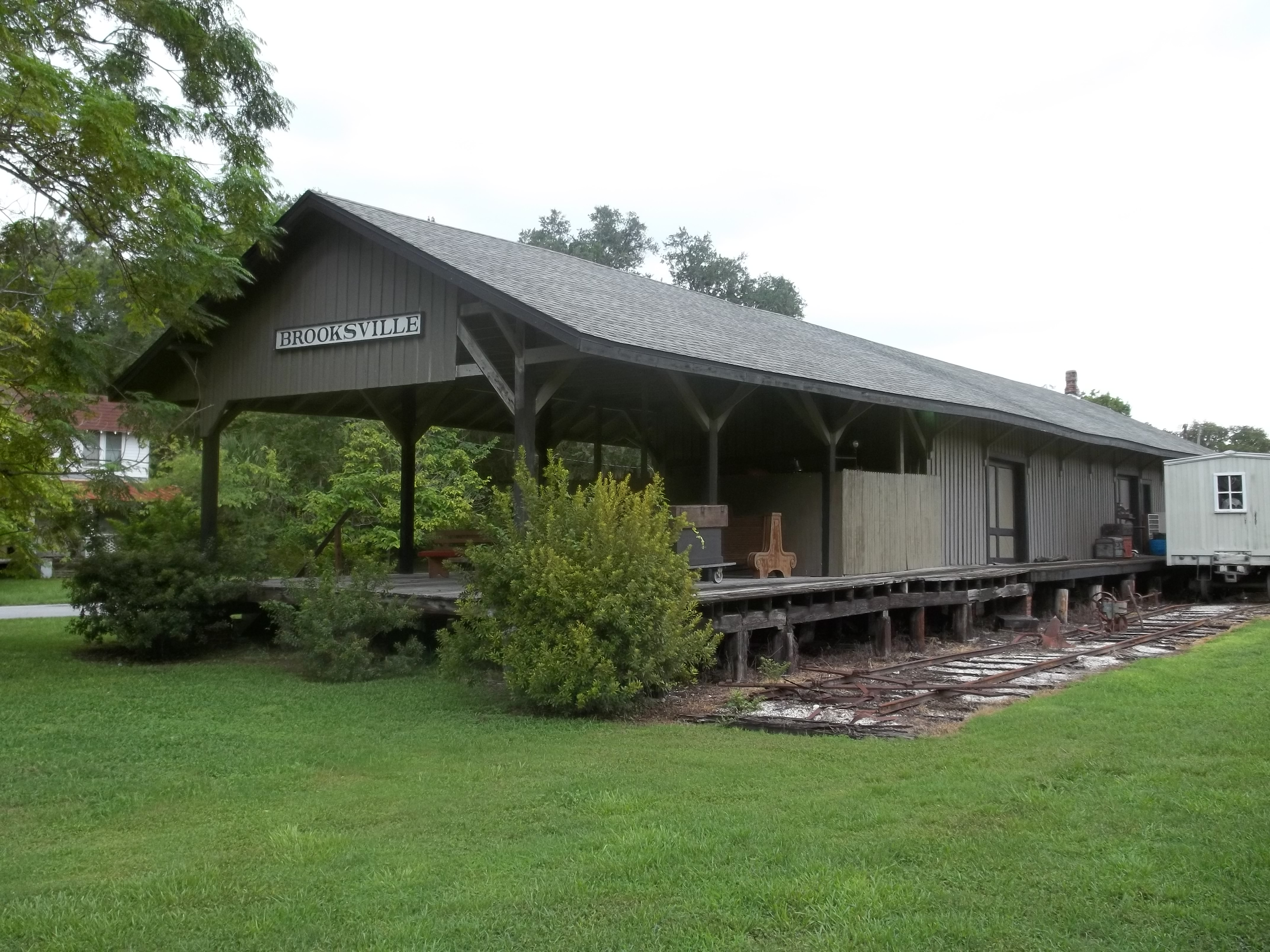
Brooksville Depot built by the Florida Southern. Building still stands and is now Brooksville Railroad Depot Museum

The Florida Southern's northern lines began along Main Street in Gainesville, where it continued south from Henry Plant's Live Oak, Tampa and Charlotte Harbor Railroad. The line headed southeast from Gainesville to Rochelle, where it split with the Palatka Branch heading east to Palatka via Hawthorne and Interlachen. The main line continued south from Rochelle to Ocala. A short branch just south of Rochelle also split from the main line to the small town of Micanopy. From Ocala, the main line continued south-southeast to Leesburg before turning southwest to Center Hill, Pemberton Ferry, and Brooksville. The line connected with the South Florida Railroad's Pemberton Ferry Branch at Pemberton Ferry, which connected the line with the Florida Southern's Charlotte Harbor Division.

The Florida Southern's northern segment would play an important role in the Atlantic Coast Line's network after it was acquired in 1902. The main route would become part of the Atlantic Coast Line's High Springs—Croom Line with track from Croom (the later name of Pemberton Ferry) to Brooksville becoming their Brooksville Branch. The Atlantic Coast Line's West Coast Champion used the line for much of its history on its run from Jacksonville to St. Petersburg.

By 1982, track south of Micanopy Junction was broken up into segments. These abandonments were mostly due to the line's proximity to CSX's S Line (the former Seaboard Air Line main line). By 1989, track was abandoned from Gainesville to Rochelle (along with the Palatka Branch to Hawthorne).

=== Palatka Branch ===
The Palatka Branch ran from Rochelle east to Palatka via Hawthorne, Edgar, and Interlachen. By 1982, the former Florida Southern's track from Palatka to Edgar was abandoned. By 1989, track was abandoned from Rochelle to Hawthorne.

=== Charlotte Harbor Division ===
The Charlotte Harbor Division began at the south end of the South Florida Railroad's Pemberton Ferry Branch in Bartow. From Bartow, it continued south roughly paralleling the Peace River through Fort Meade, Wauchula, and Arcadia before coming to an end at Punta Gorda along Charlotte Harbor. The line originally ran though Punta Gorda and terminated on the west side of town. At the terminus, a 4,200-foot dock known as Long Dock was built in Charlotte Harbor which would allow for connections to steamships. The Long Dock extended into Charlotte Harbor near present-day Jamaica Way in Punta Gorda Isles. A passenger depot was also built in the middle of town within the turning wye.

After a disagreement between Henry Plant and Punta Gorda founder Isaac Trabue, tracks to the Long Dock were removed. By 1897, Plant built a new dock at the end of King Street. A new passenger depot was also built along King Street across from Plant’s Hotel Punta Gorda.

One of the Atlantic Coast Line's first orders of business regarding the Plant System after acquiring it was extending the Florida Southern's Charlotte Harbor Division south to Fort Myers. Despite owning a hotel there, Plant had been reluctant to have the line continue to Fort Myers (which had already been established as a city when the line was built unlike Punta Gorda) under his ownership as Charlotte Harbor was his ultimate goal. However, the Atlantic Coast Line saw greater opportunity. The Atlantic Coast Line would complete the extension to Fort Myers in 1904, and would designate the line as the Lakeland—Fort Myers Line. The company further extended the line to Naples and Collier City (on Marco Island) during the Florida land boom of the 1920s. The Atlantic Coast Line's Gulf Coast Special and West Coast Champion were notable passenger services to operate on the line from Bartow to Naples.

In 1984, the line was abandoned Between Bowling Green and Arcadia. Remaining track south of Arcadia is still connected to CSX's network via the former Charlotte Harbor and Northern Railway.

== Current conditions ==
Some segments of the Florida Southern today remain active today and some abandoned segments have since become rail trails.

The Gainesville-Hawthorne State Trail runs on the Florida Southern's former right of way between those two locations. From Hawthorne east to Edgar, the line is still in service and is now CSX's Edgar Spur (which now connects to CSX's S Line).

Another active segment remains in Northern Florida between Lowell, Ocala, and Candler. This segment is operated by the Florida Northern Railroad, a shortline run by Regional Rail, LLC, which crosses the S Line in Ocala.

A short segment was still active near Leesburg which had been operated by the Florida Midland Railroad since 1987 (this line also used former Seaboard track from Wildwood to Leesburg). This line was abandoned in late 2000.

The Good Neighbor Trail runs on the former right of way between Croom and Brooksville.

Two segments of the Charlotte Harbor Division are also still in service. Trackage from Homeland (just south of Bartow) to Bowling Green is now the southernmost segment of CSX's Valrico Subdivision, which continues to carry phosphate traffic. From Arcadia south to Punta Gorda, the line is operated by Seminole Gulf Railway (who also operates the extension to Fort Myers). Some of the original right of way through downtown Punta Gorda west of US 41 is now the Punta Gorda Linear Park.

Much of U.S. Route 17 was built alongside the Charlotte Harbor Division and the highway has largely been widened into the abandoned right of way between Bowling Green and Arcadia.

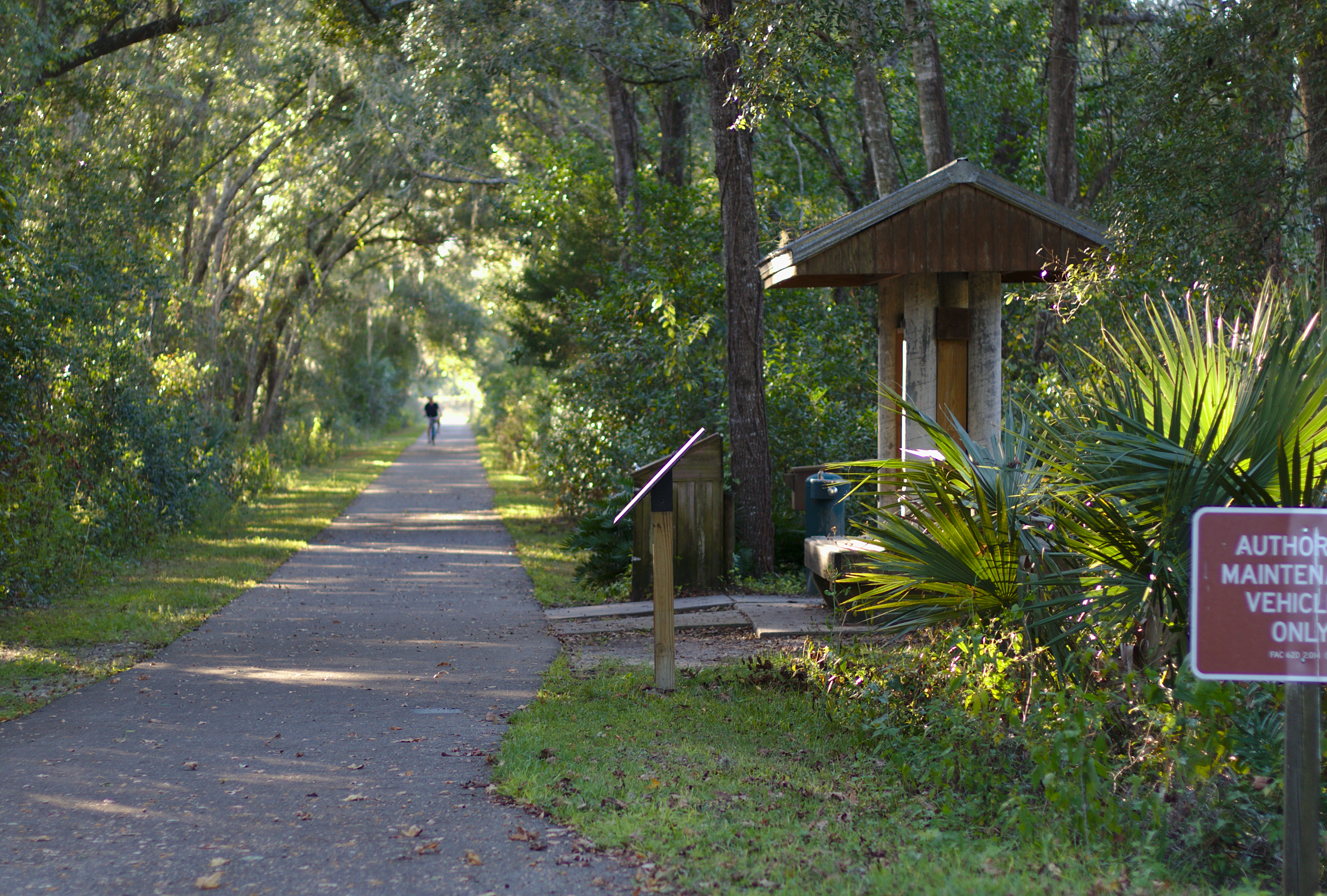
The Gainesville-Hawthorne Trail was built along the former right of way between the two locations

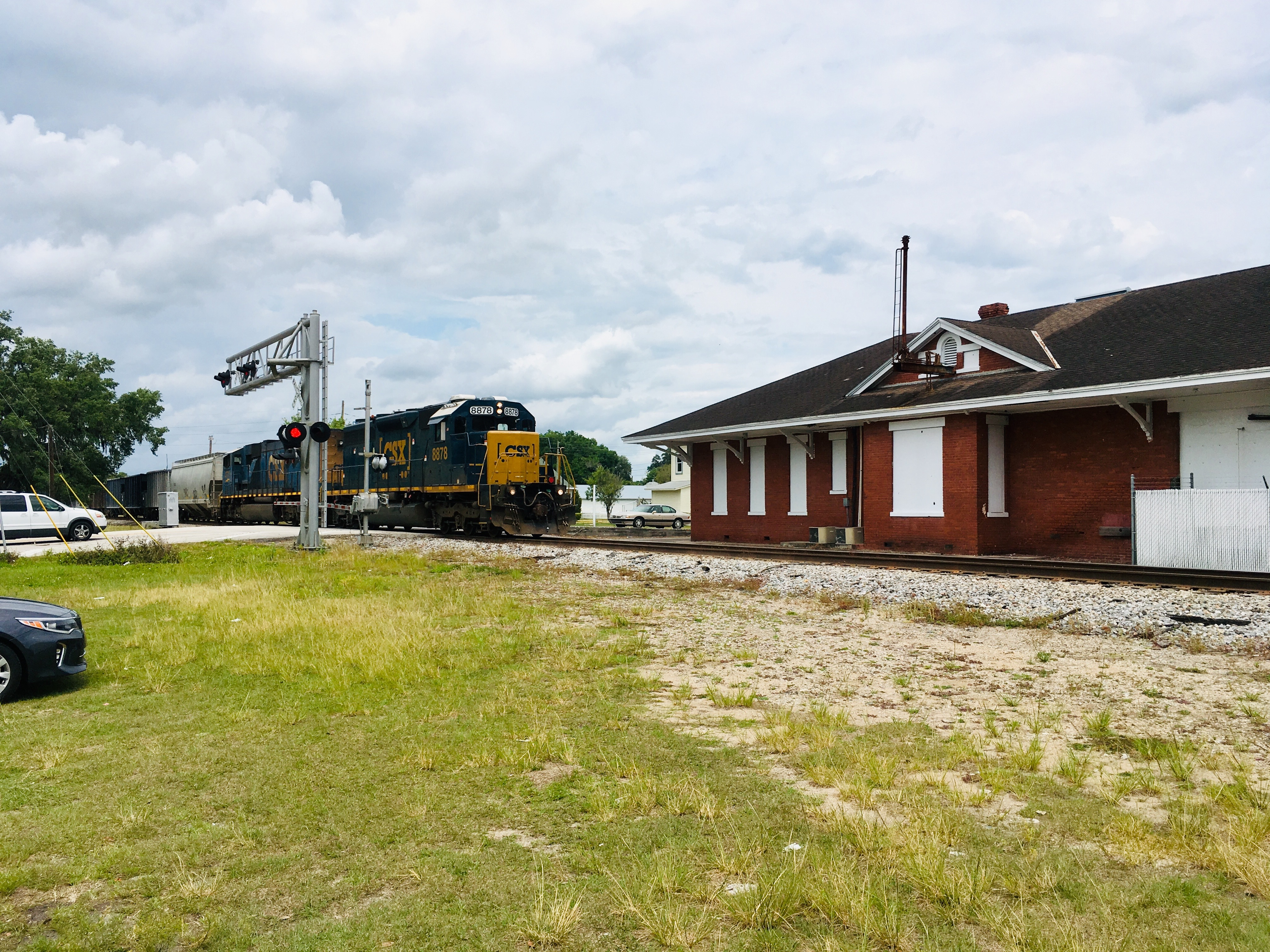
CSX train passing the historic Fort Meade Depot on the former Charlotte Harbor Division

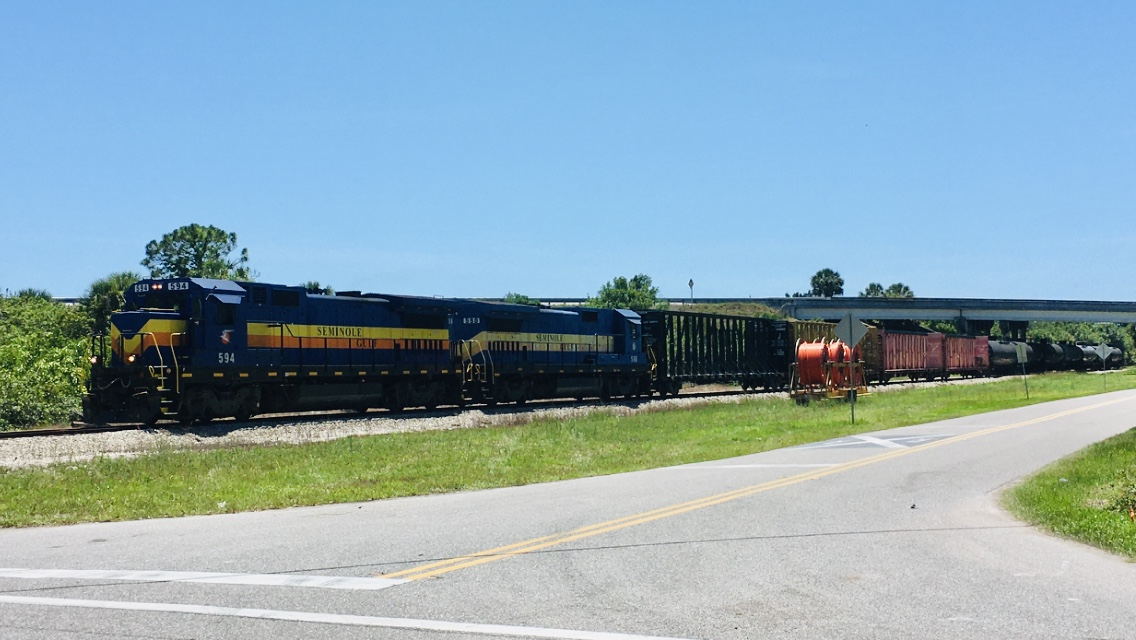
Seminole Gulf Railway's Desoto Turn on the former Charlotte Harbor Division near Punta Gorda
