= Candler, Florida =

- Unincorporated community
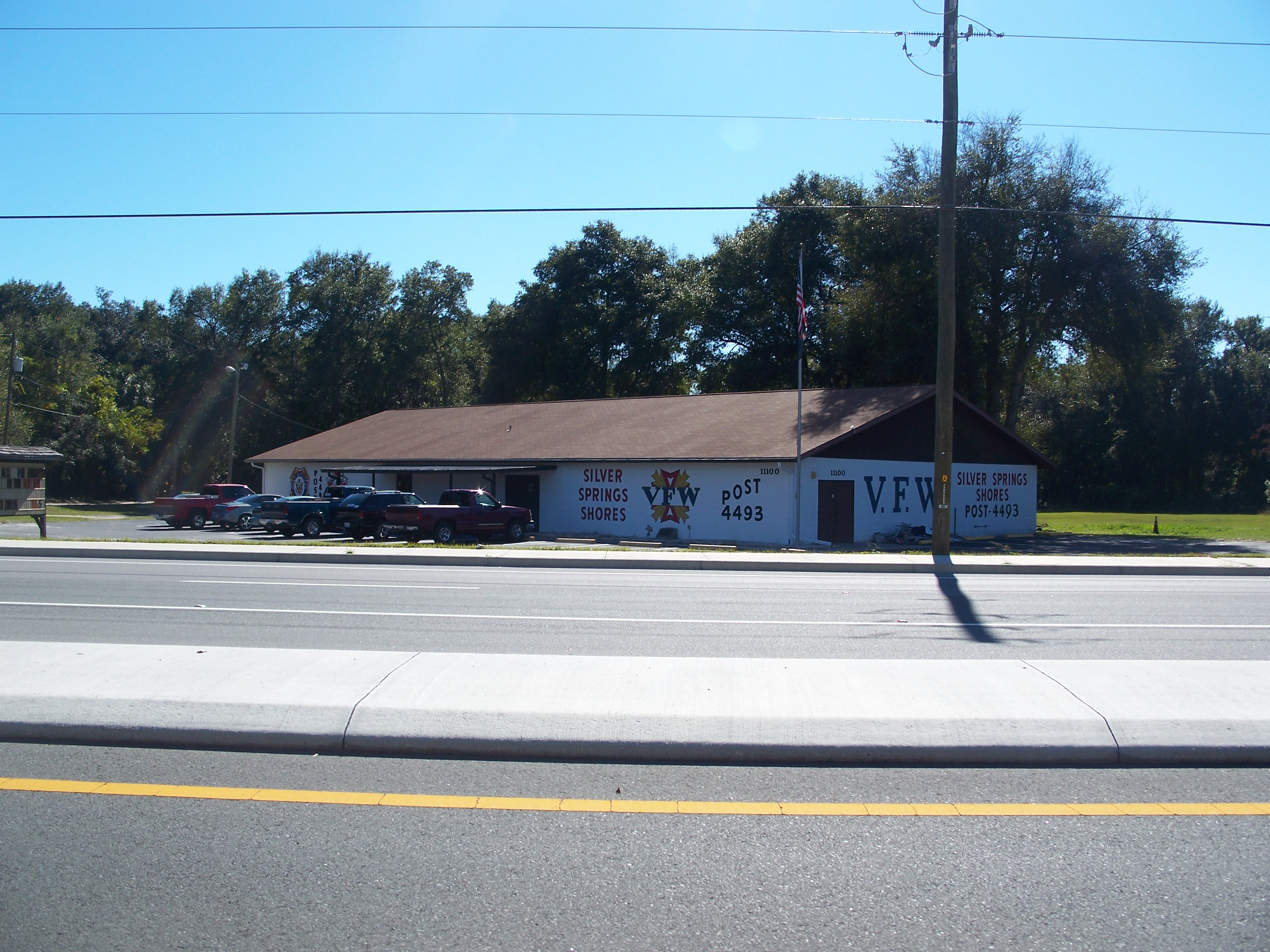
- Candler VFW

- Location within Florida Location within the United States
- Coordinates: 29°4′16″N 81°58′5″W
- Country: United States
- State: Florida
- County: Marion

Candler is an unincorporated community in Marion County, Florida, United States. It is located on County Road 464 between Silver Springs Shores and Lake Weir. The community is part of the Ocala Metropolitan Statistical Area. Candler's Zip Code is 32624.

== Geography ==
Candler is located at 29°4′16″N 81°58′5″W (29.071 -81.968).

== History ==
Candler is a post-Civil War-era town.

The plat of Candler dates to 1883/4, and the town is named for John W. Candler, then president of the Florida Southern Railway.

== Gallery ==
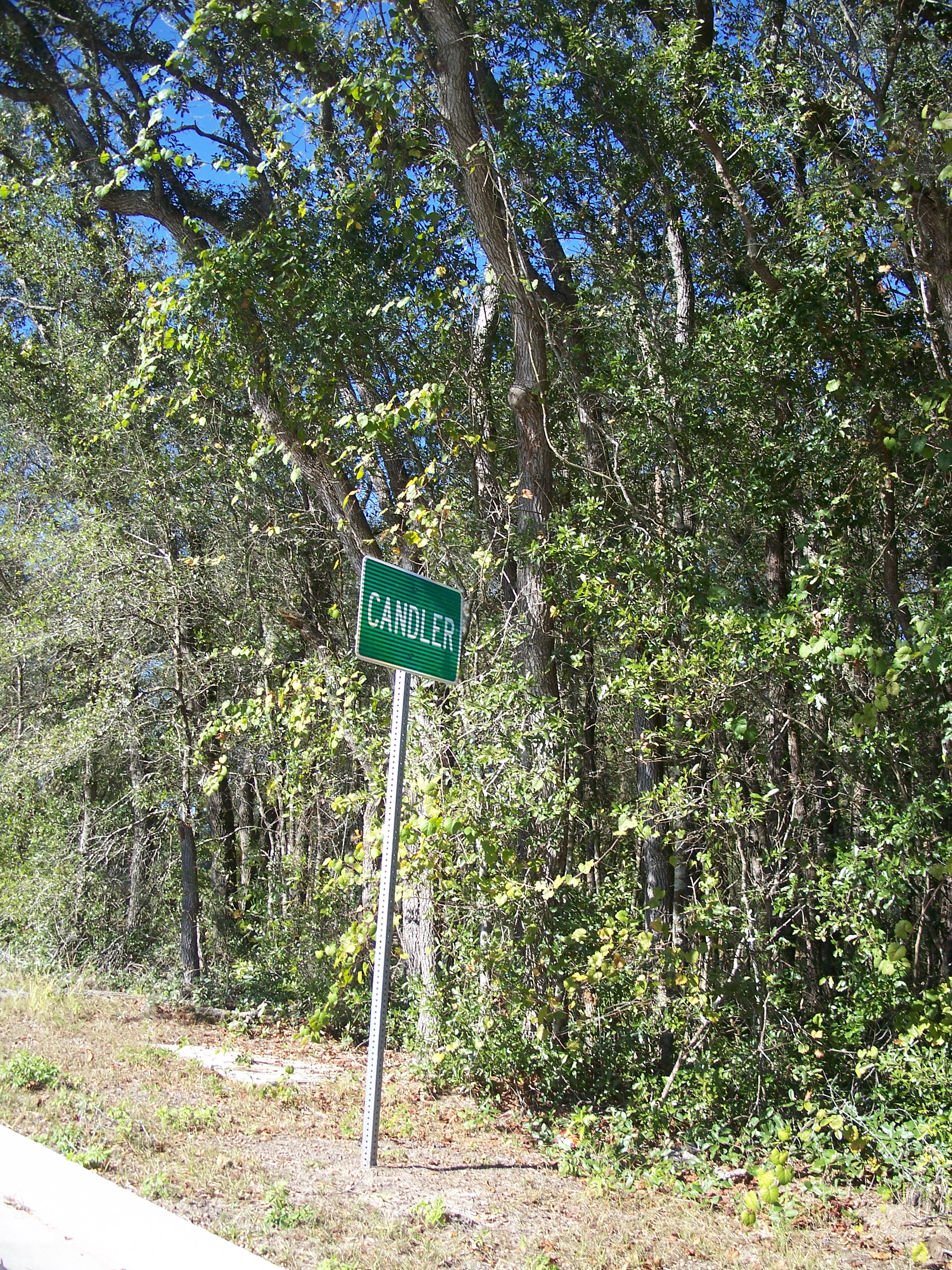
Candler FL

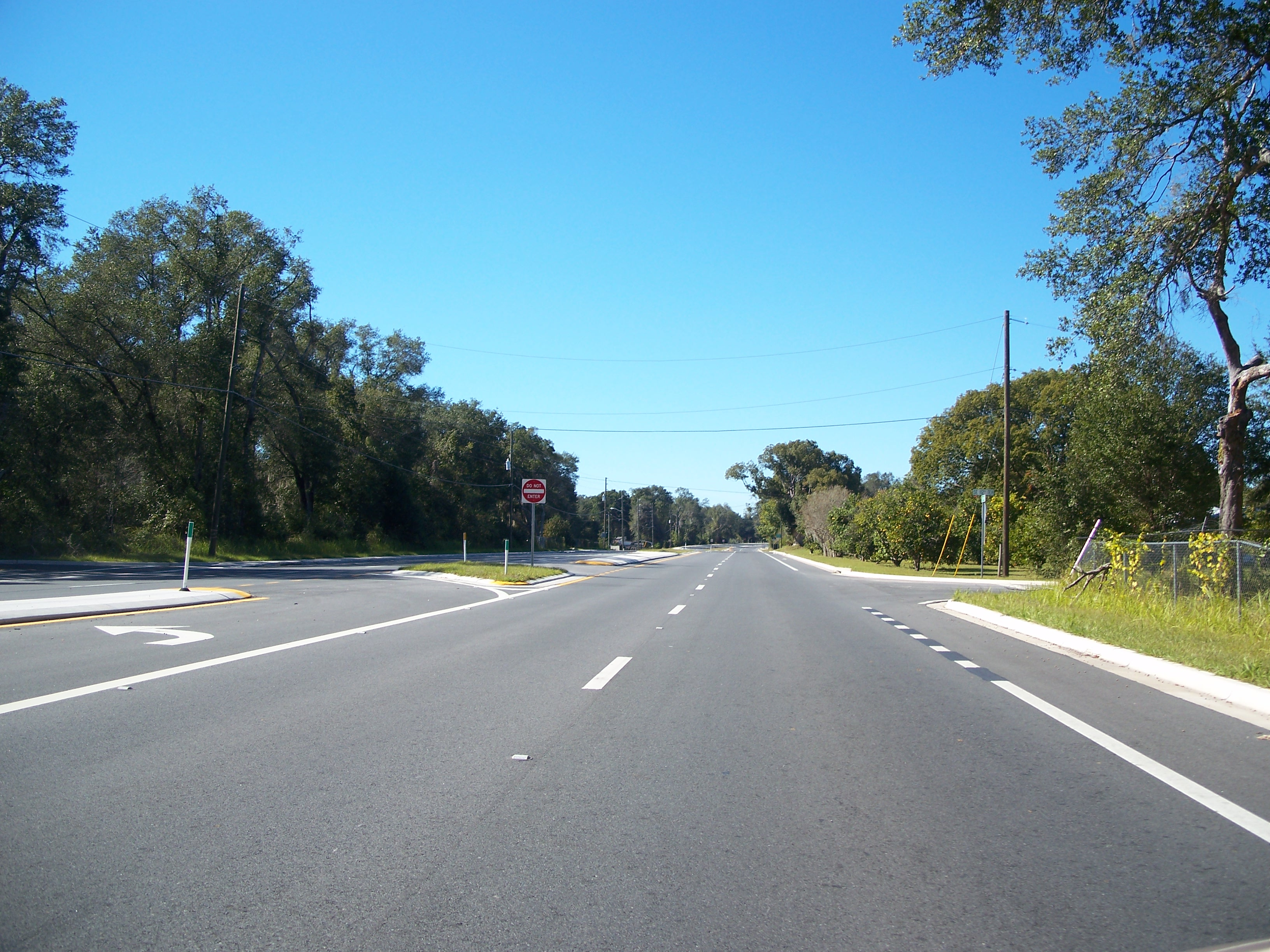
County Road 464, looking west, in Candler

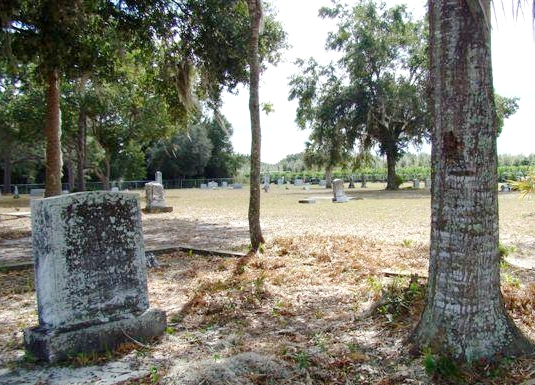
View of Candler Cemetery

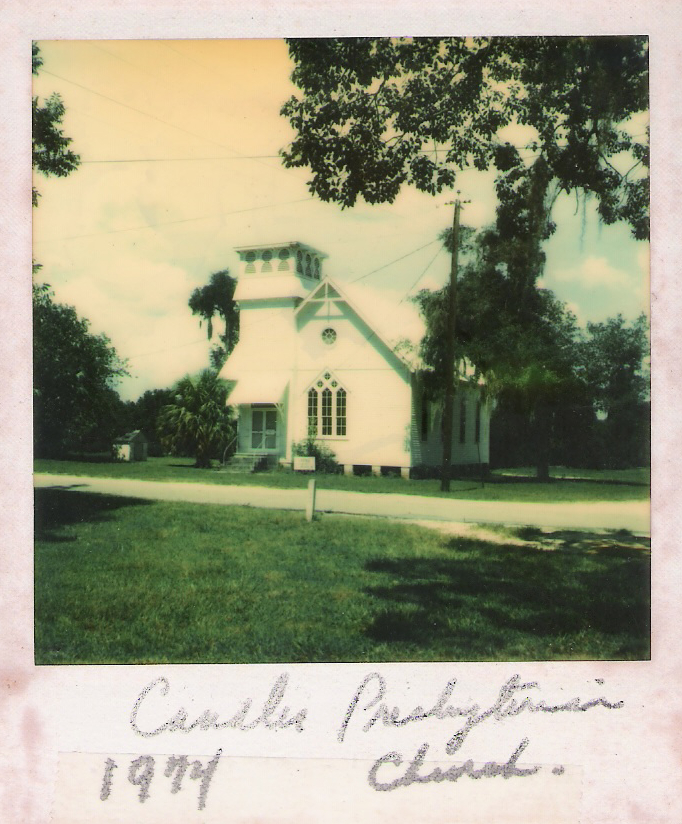
This church used to be located right in the heart of Candler. Several years ago, the whole church was moved to Silver Springs Shores, on Silver Road, and there it stands.

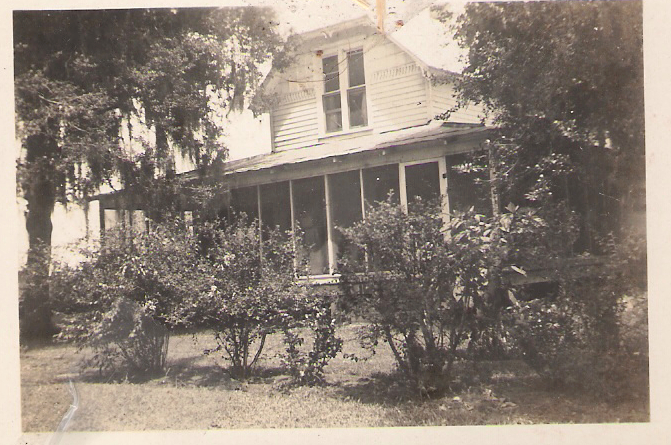
.This home was known as the Norton house in the 1920s and early thirties. J R Boots purchased it in 1939, this picture was taken post 1939

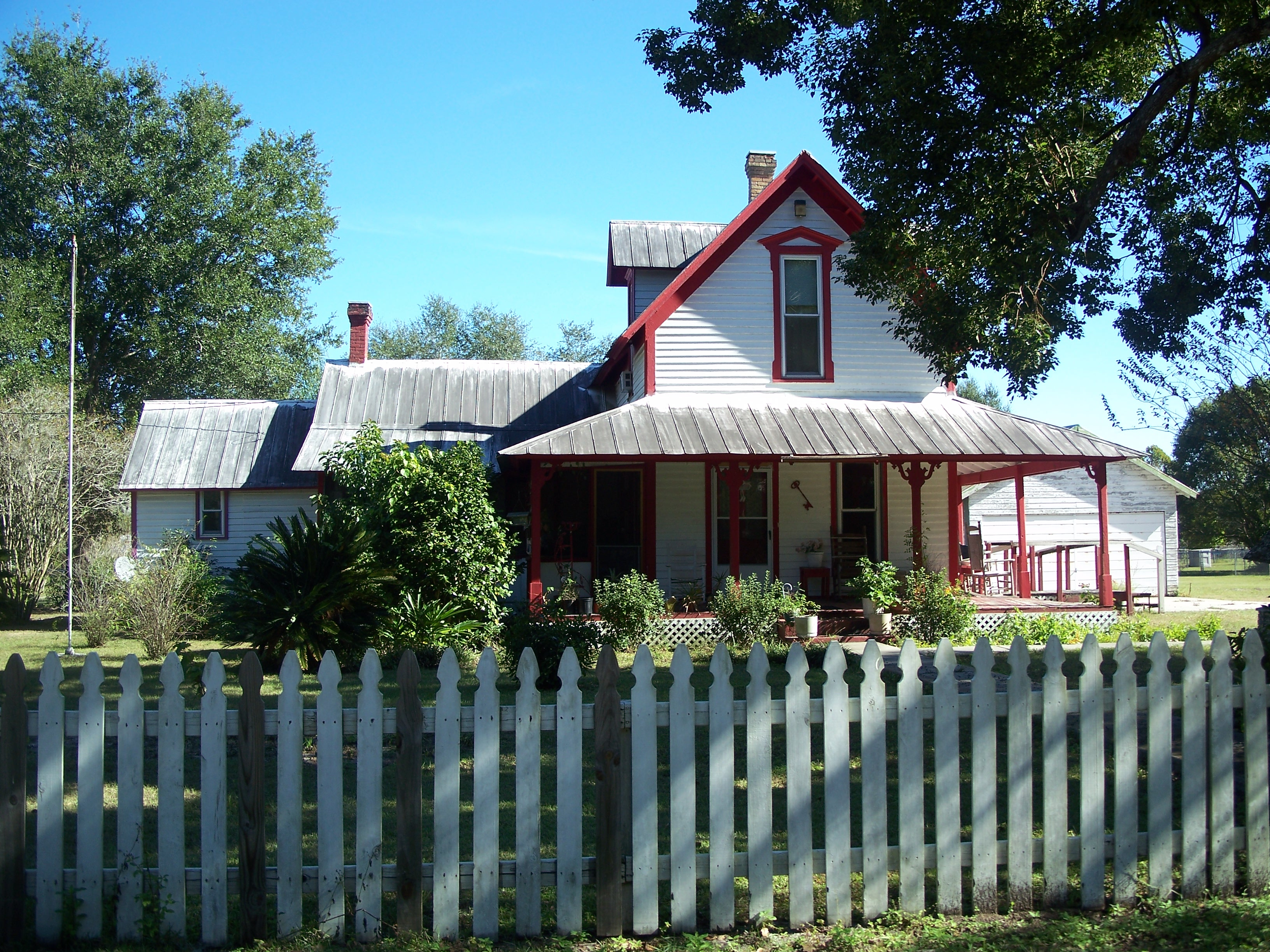
Mr.Poucher's Home

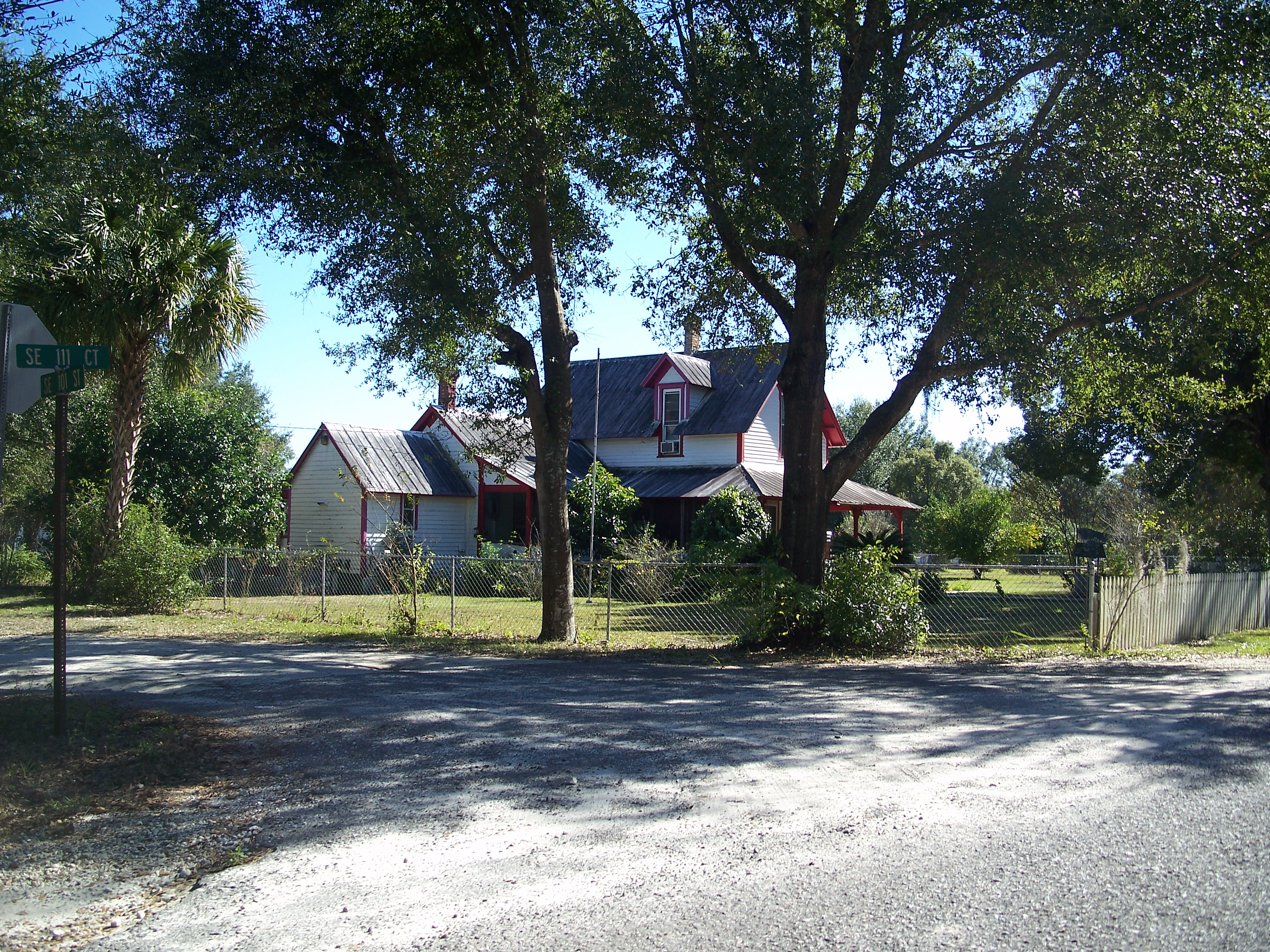
Poucher Home

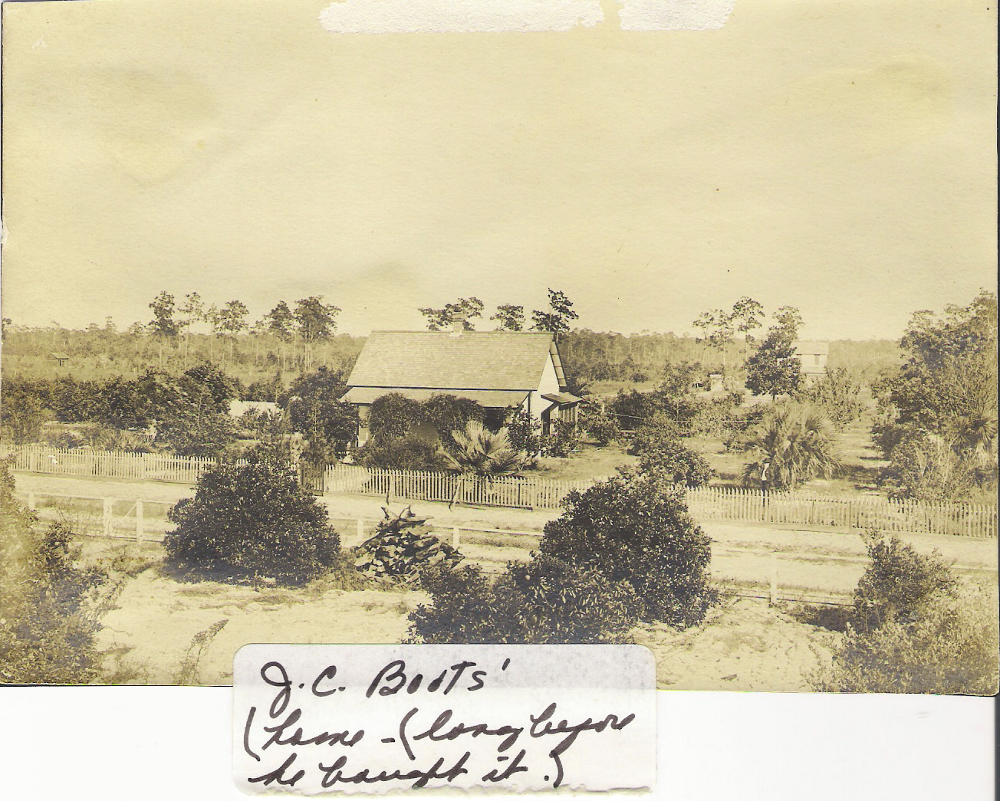
Photograph of J.C. Boots Property in 1800s

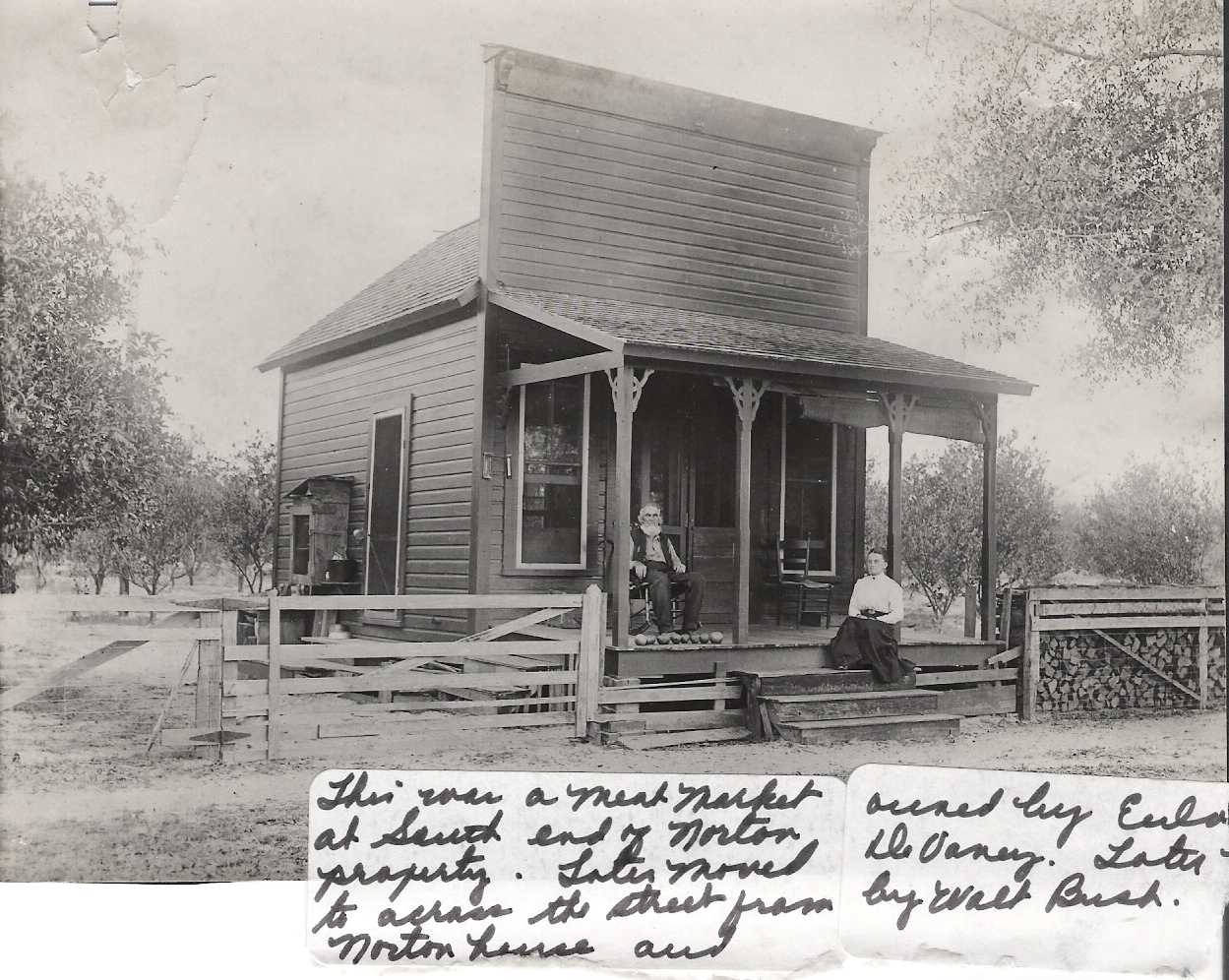
Candler's Meat Market, Photograph taken in 1800s

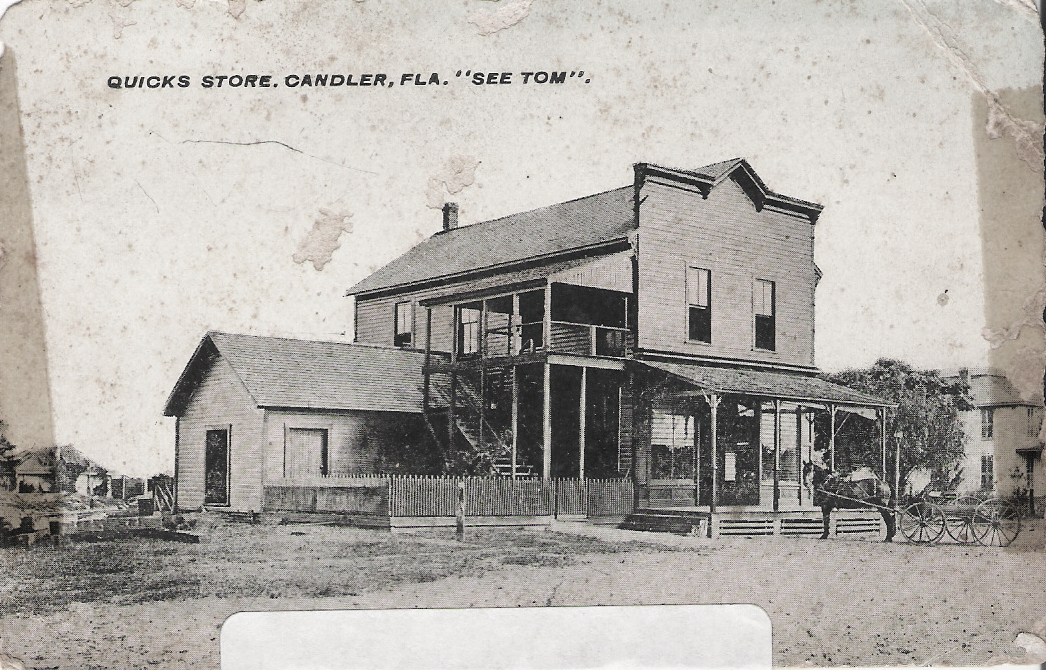
Candler's Old General Store

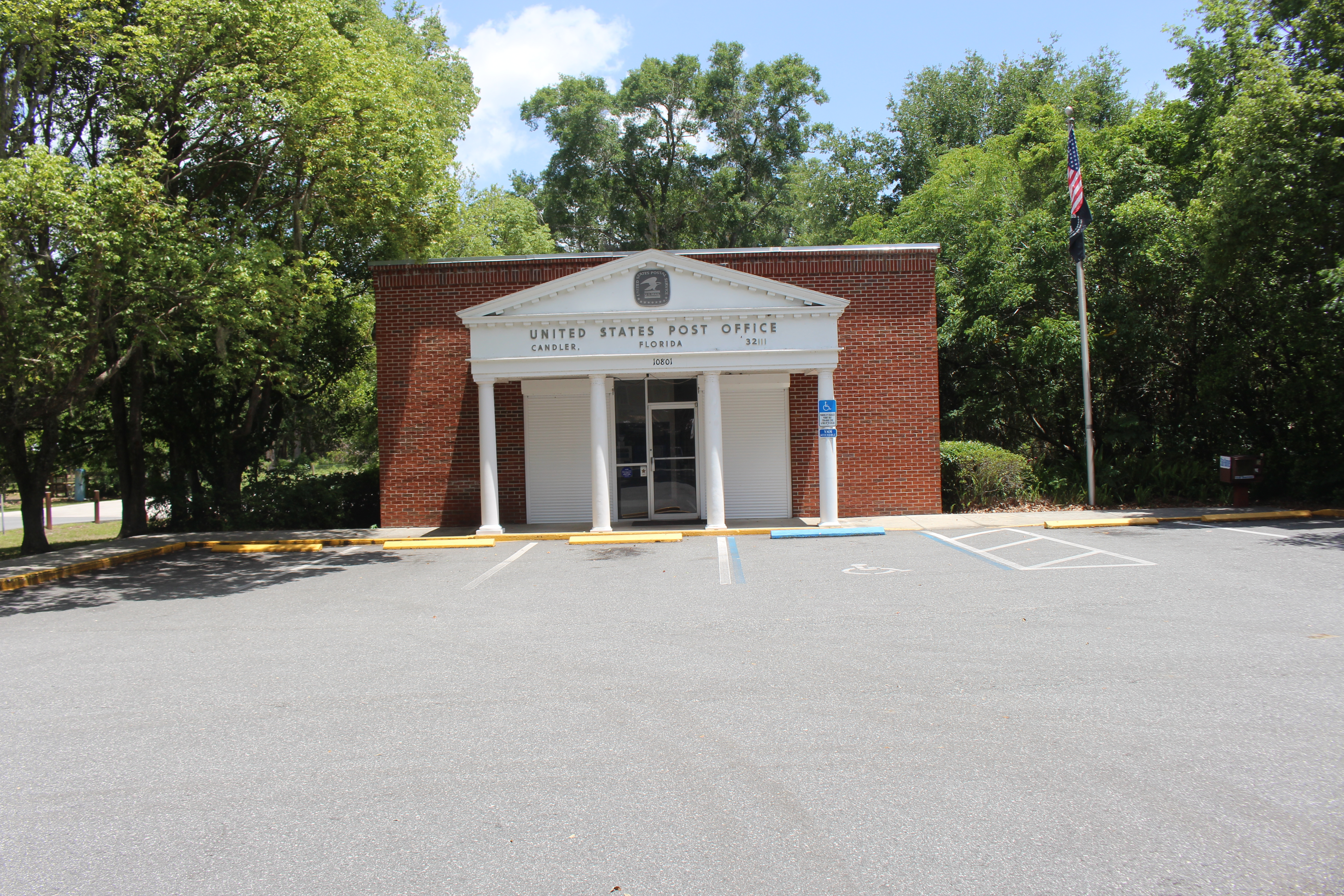
Post office
