= Rainbow Springs State Park =

State park in Florida, United States

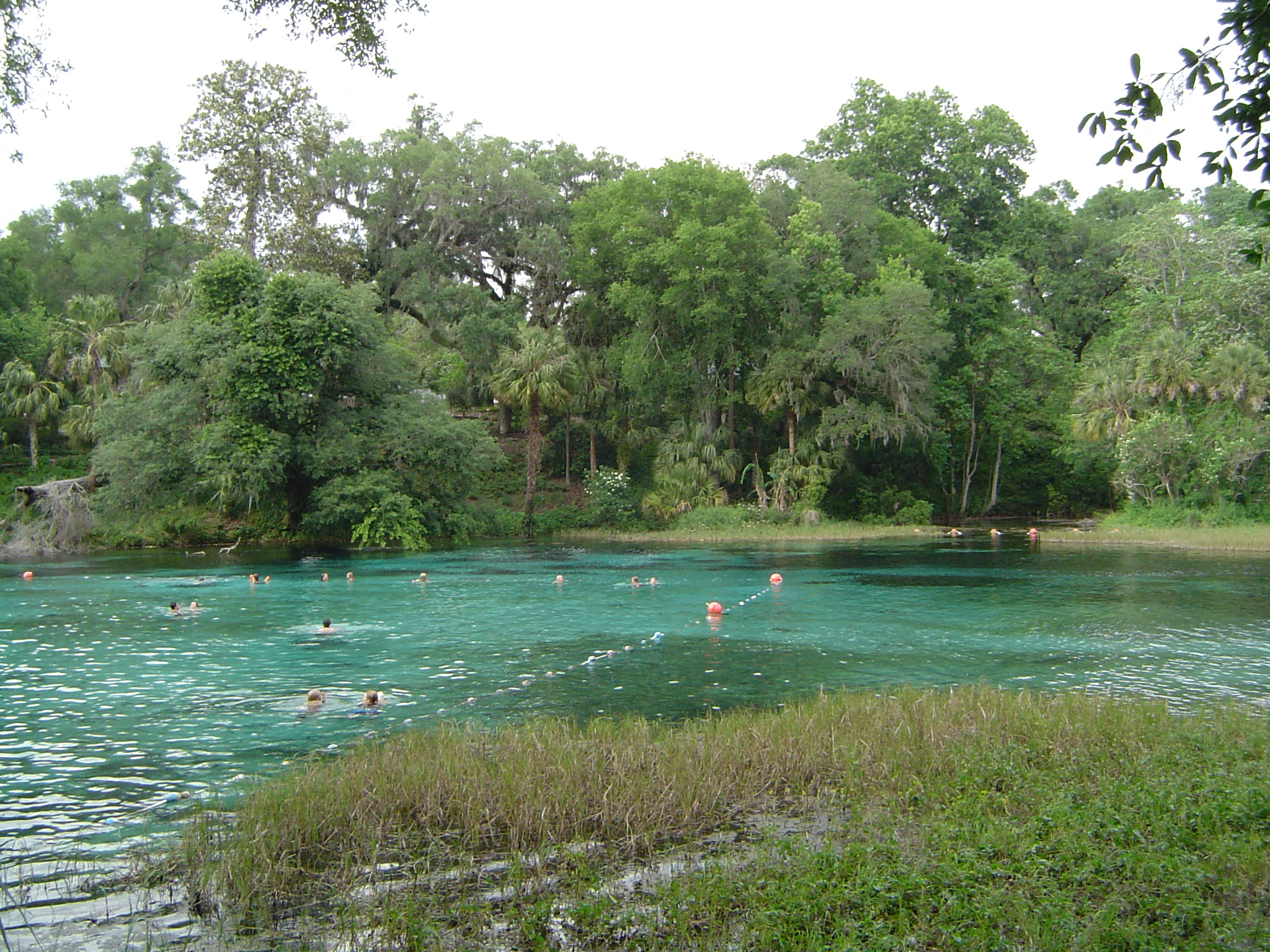
- Rainbow Springs

- Location within Florida Location within the United States
- Interactive map of Rainbow Springs State Park
- Location: Marion County, Florida, USA
- Nearest city: Dunnellon
- Coordinates: 29°6′9.57″N 82°26′13.38″W
- Area: 1,000 acres (4.0 km^{2})
- Governing body: Florida Department of Environmental Protection

U.S. National Natural Landmark
- Designated: 1990

The Rainbow River Path

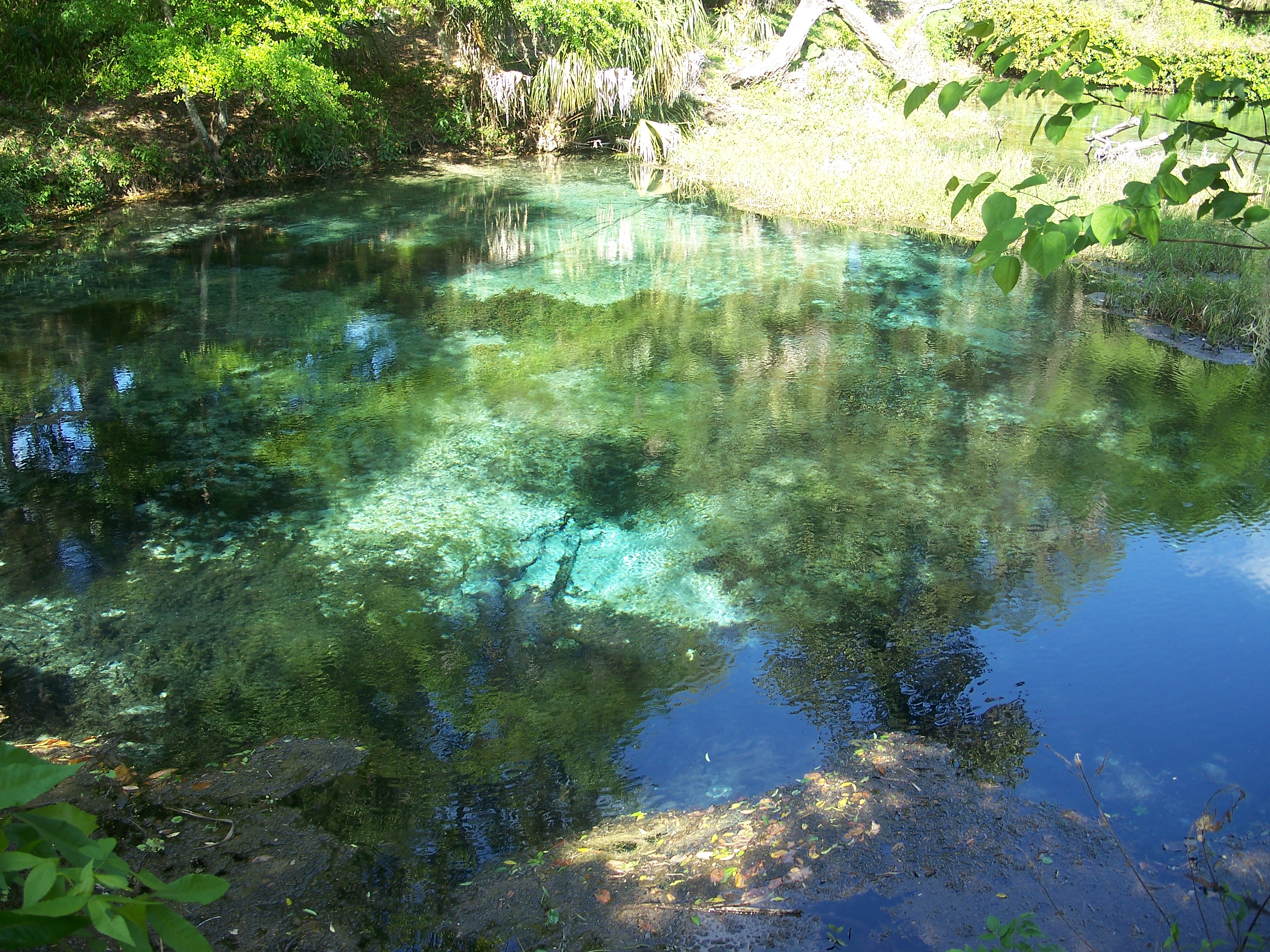
Rainbow Springs, one of the springs at the head of Rainbow River

Rainbow Springs State Park is a Florida state park located on U.S. 41, 3 miles (5 km) north of Dunnellon, Florida. It comprises 1,459.07 acres (5.9046 km^{2}) upland (which includes around 100 acres (0.40 km^{2}) of wetlands) and 12.83 acres (51,900 m^{2}) submerged. The most significant natural feature is the first-magnitude headspring basin, which produces up to 600,000,000 US gallons (2,300,000 m^{3}) of fresh water per day, forming the Rainbow River. The looking-glass waters of Rainbow Springs come from several vents, not one large bubbling spring. The river itself supports a wide variety of fish, wildlife, and plants, many within easy viewing by visitors. In total, the park contains 11 distinct natural communities, including sandhills, flatwoods, upland mixed forests, and hydric hammocks.

Visitors are able to see a variety of wildflowers in season; oak, longleaf pines, magnolia, dogwood, red maple, redbud, cypress, sabal, and hickory trees; gray squirrels, red-shouldered hawks, swallowtail kites, barred owls, whitetail deer, and a wide variety of wading birds. The relative peace and quiet of the winter season offers much for the nature enthusiast. An interpretive room located in the visitor center displays the historical, natural, and cultural resources of the park.

== History ==
It was known as Blue Spring until the 1930s, when the site was developed as a tourist attraction and the promoter sought a more distinctive name (there are several other springs in Florida named "Wekiwa" and "Blue"). To compete with the "glass bottom boats" of nearby Silver Springs, Florida, submarine tours were given of the springs. As for some other Florida springs, such as Weeki Wachee Springs, "mermaid shows" were an attraction in the 1950s. The tourist attraction was forced to close in the 1970s at Rainbow Springs but still goes on daily at Weeki Wachee Springs.

The entire Rainbow River was designated as a Registered Natural Landmark in 1972, an Aquatic Preserve in 1986, and an "Outstanding Florida Waterway" in 1987. The land around the headwaters of the springs remained privately owned until 1990, when the State of Florida acquired the springs and saved them from development. Much of the work to open Rainbow Springs State Park was done by volunteers from the community.

== Geography ==
The Rainbow River flows from Rainbow Springs into the Withlacoochee River.

== Ecology ==
Among the wildlife of the park are gray squirrels, otter, turtles, alligators, and many types of birds. Among the birds are songbirds, hummingbirds, red-shoulder hawks, and swallowtail kites, as well as ospreys, barred owls, and various water birds. The site has a 2-mile (3.2 km) nature trail.

== Recreational activities and amenities ==
Activities include swimming, snorkeling, canoeing, kayaking, and wildlife viewing. Amenities include a nature trail, a full-service campground, a picnic area with pavilions, canoe and kayak rentals, and gardens, as well as access to the Rainbow River. It also has waterfalls and phosphate pits from former open-mining activity. A small zoo complex was once located in the gardens. Some of the facilities still exist, but are no longer used. At the entrance is a small visitor center, shop, snack bar, and restrooms, located in an elevated position above Rainbow Springs with a good view along the Rainbow River.

== Hours ==
Florida state parks are open between 8:00 am and sundown every day of the year (including holidays).
