= Regional Rail, LLC =

Railroad holding company

- Industry: Short line freight railroads
- Founded: 2007
- Headquarters: Kennett Square, Pennsylvania, United States
- Area served: United States and Canada
- Key people: Alfred M. Sauer, President and CEO
- Parent: 3i RR Holdings GP, LLC
- Website: www.regional-rail.com

Regional Rail, LLC is a holding company that owns short-line railroads and related businesses in the United States and Canada. It is based in Kennett Square, Pennsylvania. Regional Rail is owned by 3i RR Holdings GP, the US subsidiary of 3i.

== Operations ==
As of June 2026, Regional Rail owns 14 Class III railroads in the United States, with the acquisition of one more pending:

- Carolina Coastal Railway
- Cincinnati Eastern Railroad
- East Penn Railroad
- Effingham Railroad
- Florida Central Railroad
- Florida Midland Railroad
- Florida Northern Railroad
- Illinois Western Railroad
- Indiana Eastern Railroad (including Ohio South Central Railroad)
- Massachusetts Central Railroad (acquisition expected July 2026)
- Middletown and New Jersey Railroad
- Minnesota Commercial Railway
- Port Manatee Railroad
- South Point and Ohio Railroad
- Tyburn Railroad

The company also owns:

- Burns Harbor Railroad, a switching railroad at the Port of Indiana
- Diamondback Signal, an installer and maintainer of grade crossing signals for short-line and regional railroads
- Great Sandhills Railway, a regional railroad in Canada
- Commercial Transload of Minnesota, a warehousing, transload, and trucking company

== History ==
Regional Rail, LLC was formed in April 2007. Four months later, it took over the East Penn Railroad. In April 2009, the company acquired the Middletown and New Jersey Railroad. In September 2011, Regional Rail, LLC took over the Tyburn Railroad. In June 2012, Regional Rail, LLC took over the Conshohocken Recycling & Rail Transfer. Two months later, the company gained majority ownership of Diamondback Signal, LLC. In August 2015, private equity group Levine Leichtman Capital Partners purchased Regional Rail, intending to continue its operations. In 2019, Levine Leichtman Capital Partners sold Regional Rail to 3i RR Holdings GP, LLC, the US rail subsidiary of the private equity firm based in the United Kingdom.

In November 2019, Regional Rail purchased the Florida Central Railroad, Florida Midland Railroad and Florida Northern Railroad from Pinsly Railroad Company.

In November 2022, G3 Canada sold Great Sandhills Railway to Regional Rail. In November 2023 the company announced plans to acquire the Indiana Eastern Railroad and the Ohio South Central Railroad.
