= Red Level, Florida =

Unincorporated community in Florida, US

Red Level
- Unincorporated community
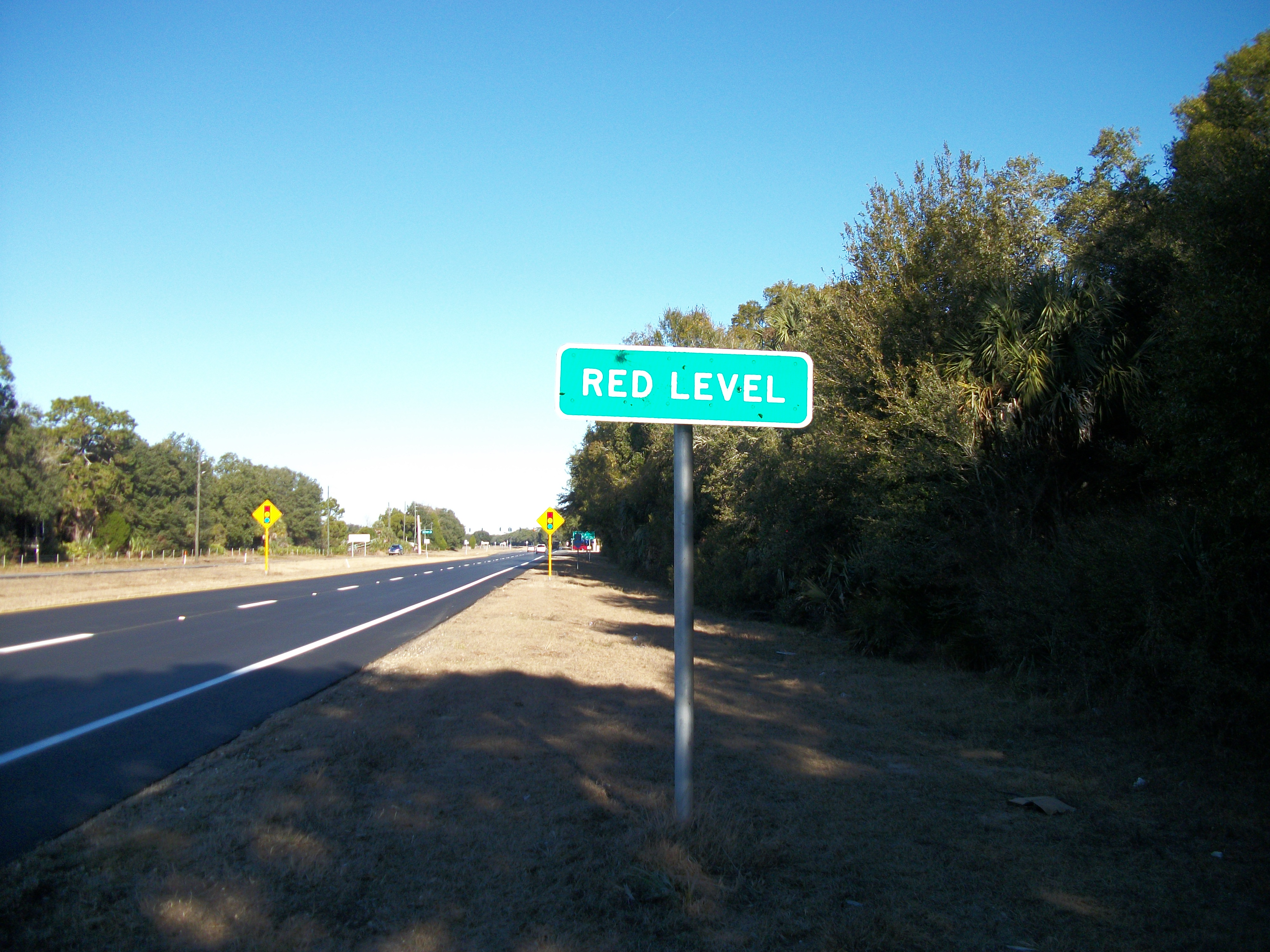
- Sign for Red Level on US 19-98

- Location within Florida
- Coordinates: 28°58′11″N 82°38′10″W
- Country: United States
- State: Florida
- County: Citrus
- Elevation: 13 ft (4.0 m)
- Time zone: UTC-5 (Eastern (EST))
  - Summer (DST): UTC-4 (EDT)
- Area code: 352
- GNIS feature ID: 294904

Red Level is an unincorporated community in Citrus County, Florida, United States. The ZIP Codes are 34428, which it shares with Crystal River to the southeast, and 34449, which it shares with Inglis to the north in Levy County.
