= Rainbow Springs =

First-magnitude artesian spring formation in Marion County, Florida

Coordinates: 29°06′09″N 82°26′13″W

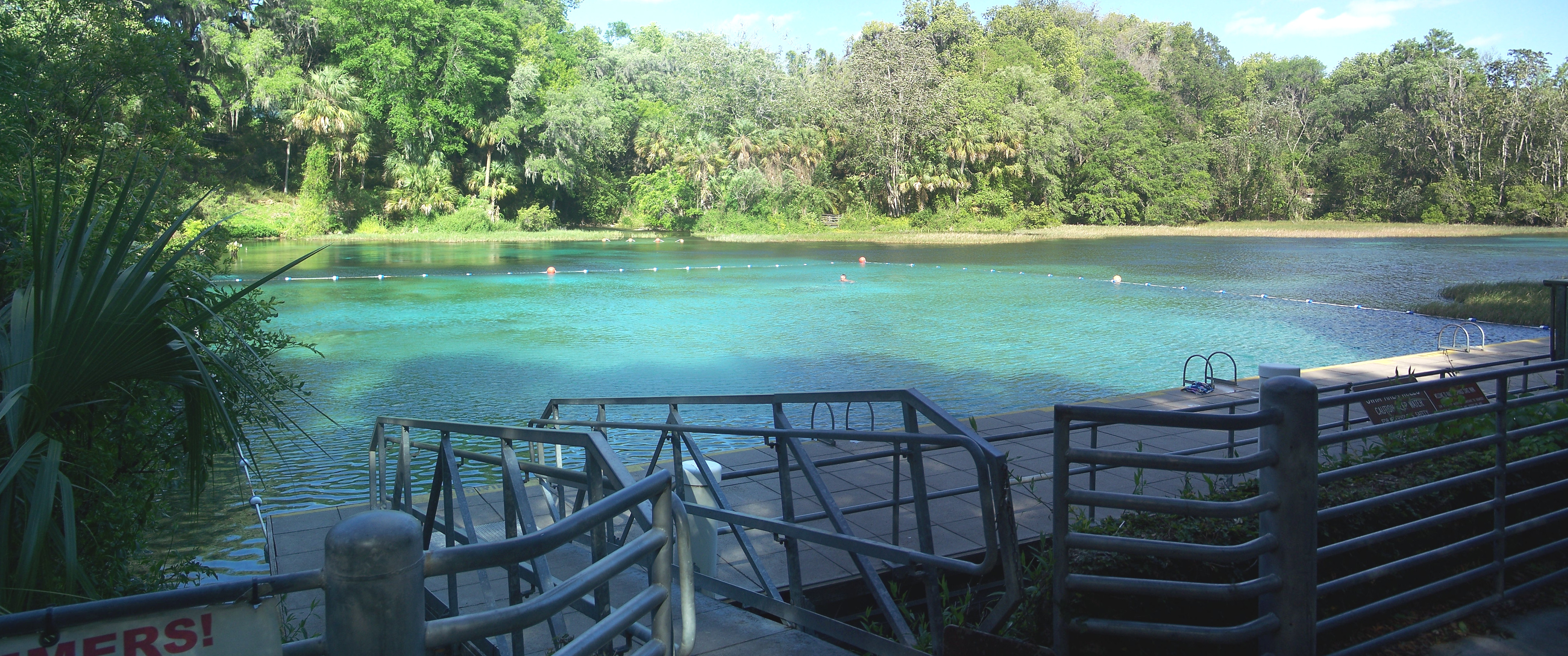
Rainbow Springs, the swimming area

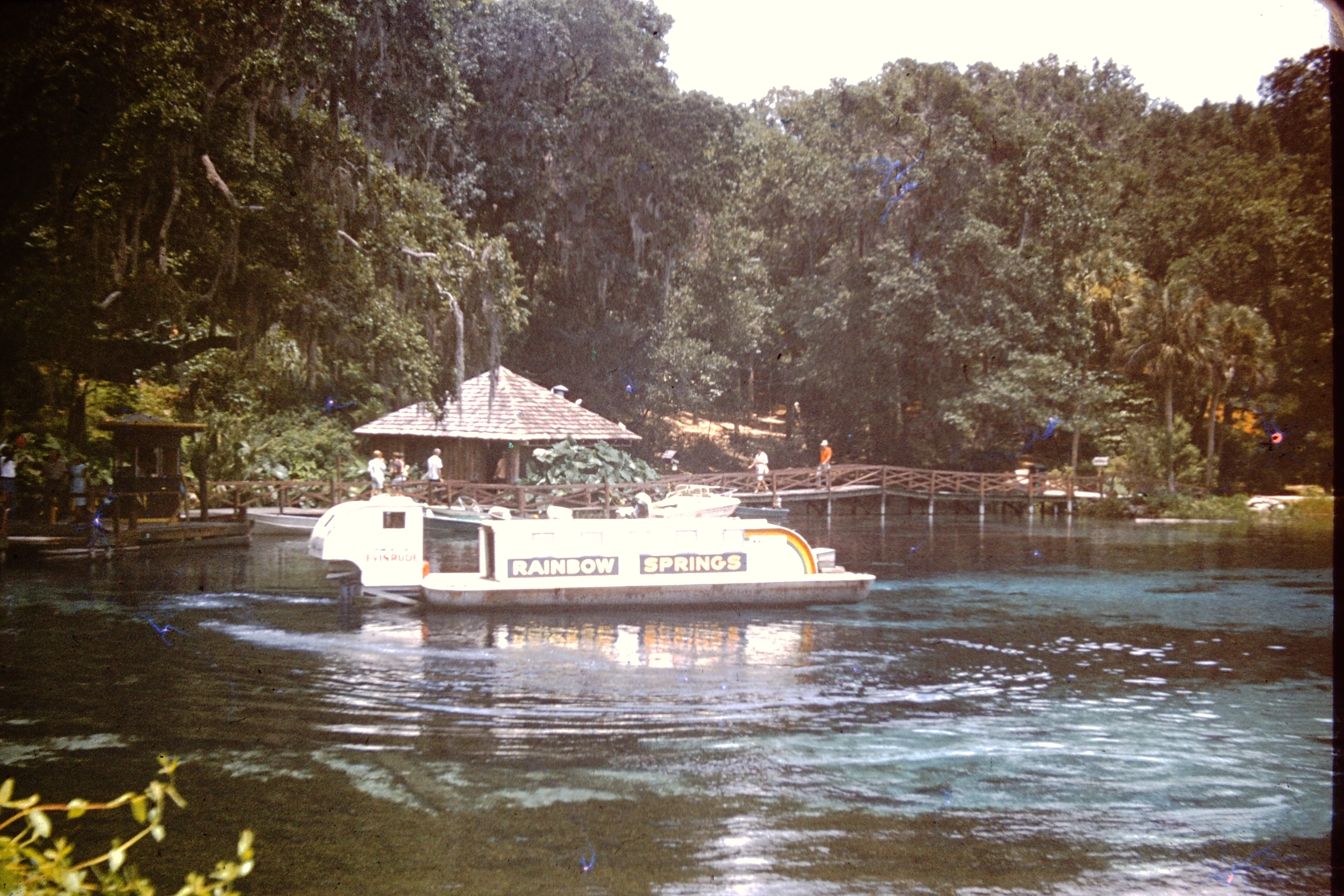
Rainbow Springs "submarine" sightseeing boat where passengers sat below the waterline looking out underwater windows around 1970

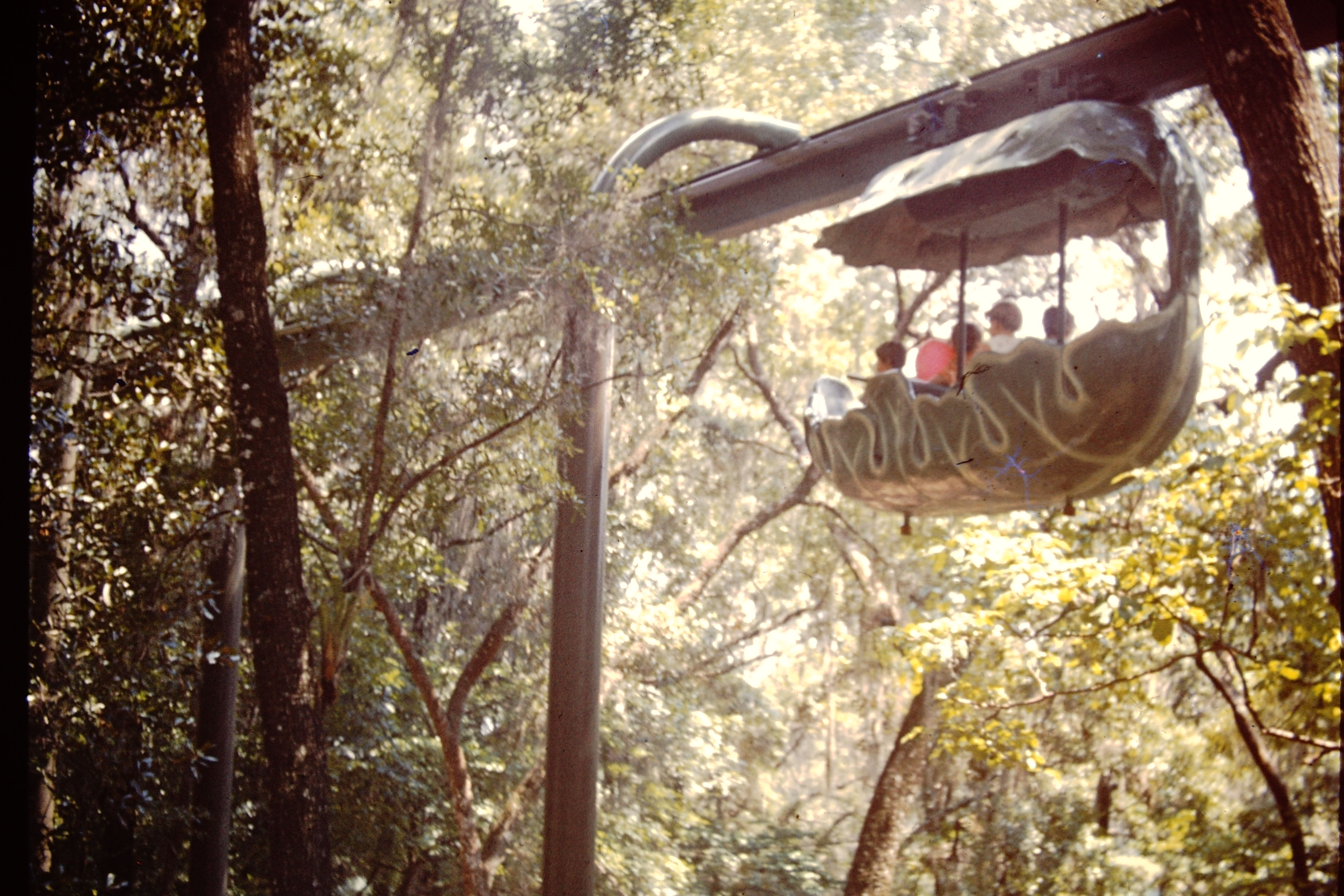
monorail ride at Rainbow Springs attraction around 1970

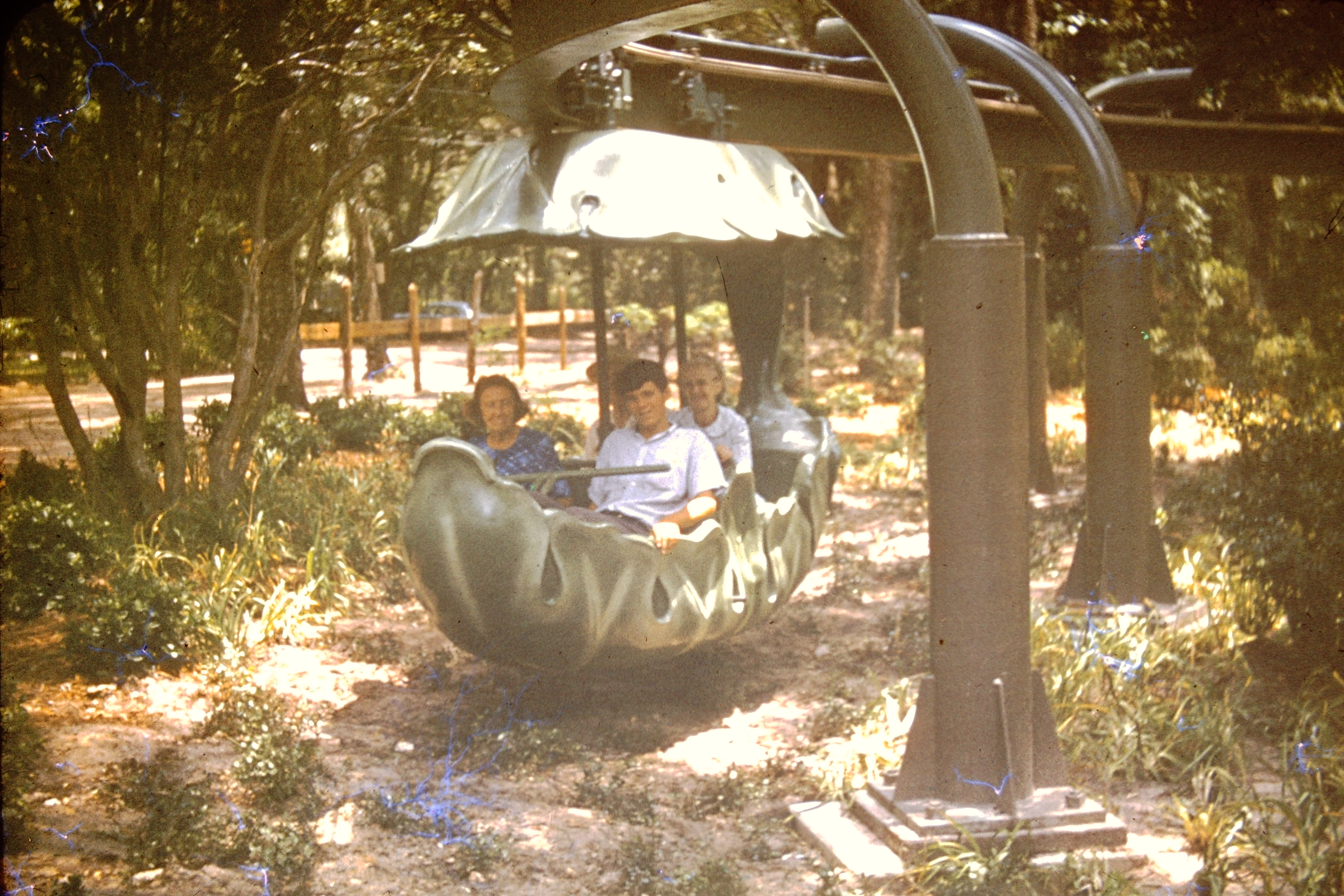
The Rainbow Springs monorail around 1970; this is near the end of the ride where it comes low to the ground near where people get on or off

The Rainbow River Path

Rainbow Springs, formerly known as Blue Spring, is a first-magnitude artesian spring formation in Marion County, Florida, United States, several miles north of the city of Dunnellon. Rainbow Springs is the focal point of Rainbow Springs State Park. The spring formation is the fourth-largest in Florida, and produces over 490 million gallons of water daily. Rainbow Springs forms the headwaters of the Rainbow River, which empties into the Withlacoochee River.

== History ==
Rainbow Springs was known as Wekiwa Creek by the Seminole Indians.

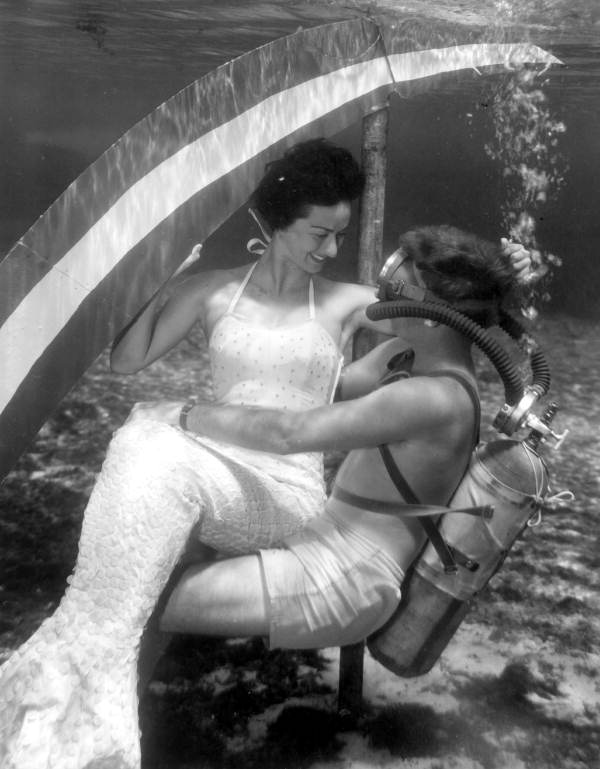
Fishing for Mermaids in 1956

It was known as Blue Spring until the 1930s, when the site was developed as a tourist attraction and the promoter sought a more distinctive name (there are several other springs in Florida named "Wekiwa" and "Blue"). To compete with the "glass bottom boats" of nearby Silver Springs, Florida, submarine tours were given of the springs. As for some other Florida springs, such as Weeki Wachee Springs, "mermaid shows" were an attraction in the 1950s. The tourist attraction was forced to close in the 1970s at Rainbow Springs but still goes on daily at Weeki Wachee Springs.

The entire Rainbow River was designated as a Registered Natural Landmark in 1972, an Aquatic Preserve in 1986, and an "Outstanding Florida Waterway" in 1987. The land around the headwaters of the springs remained privately owned until 1990, when the State of Florida acquired the springs and saved them from development. Much of the work to open Rainbow Springs State Park was done by volunteers from the community.

== See also ==
- Rainbow River
