= List of United States representatives in the 66th Congress =

This is a complete list of United States representatives during the 66th United States Congress listed by seniority. For the most part, representatives are ranked by the beginning of their terms in office.

As an historical article, the districts and party affiliations listed reflect those during the 66th Congress (March 4, 1919 – March 3, 1921). Seats and party affiliations on similar lists for other congresses will be different for certain members.

This article describes the criteria for seniority in the House of Representatives and sets out the list of members by seniority. It is prepared on the basis of the interpretation of seniority applied to the House of Representatives in the current congress. In the absence of information to the contrary, it is presumed that the twenty-first-century practice is identical to the seniority customs used during the 66th Congress.

== Seniority ==
=== House seniority ===
Seniority in the House, for representatives with unbroken service, depends on the date on which the members first term began. That date is either the start of the Congress (4 March in odd numbered years, for the era up to and including the 73rd Congress starting in 1933) or the date of a special election during the Congress. Since many members start serving on the same day as others, ranking between them is based on alphabetical order by the last name of the representative. If there is still a tie, then the first names are used.

Representatives who return to the House, after having previously served, are credited with service equal to one less than the total number of terms they served. When a representative has served a prior term of less than two terms (i.e., prior term minus one equals less than one), the member is ranked above all others whose service begins on the same day.

=== Committee seniority ===
At the start of the 66th Congress in 1919, the committee assignments were made by each party and then formally approved by the whole House. Each party controlled the committee ranking of its members, but usually this followed the order of seniority of members in terms of service on the committee. It was customary for members of a committee, in the previous congress, to be re-appointed at the start of the next.

A seniority rule was normally used to decide committee chairmen. The chairman was likely to be the majority member of a committee, with the longest continuous service on it. However, party leadership was typically not associated with seniority.

Out of a group of fifty seven standing committee chairmen, at the start of this Congress, Nelson Polsby identified thirty five as the most senior member of the majority on the committee. In nineteen other cases, senior majority members were compensated for not being chairman of the committee (ten chaired another committee, eight received better committee assignments than in the previous Congress and one joined the leadership). In three instances there was no obvious compensation for the apparent violation of the seniority custom.

== Committees ==
This list refers to the standing committees of the House in the 66th Congress, the year of establishment as a standing committee (adoption of the name used in 1919), the number of members assigned to the committee and the corresponding committee in the current congress. Because of consolidation of committees and changes of jurisdiction, it is not always possible to identify a clear successor panel.

No.	1919 committee	Established	Members	2011 committee
1	Accounts	1805	11	House Administration
2	Agriculture	1820	21	Agriculture
3	Alcoholic Liquor Traffic	1893	11	Judiciary
4	Appropriations	1865	35	Appropriations
5	Banking and Currency	1865	21	Financial Services
6	Census	1901	16	Oversight and Government Reform
7	Claims	1794	16	Judiciary
8	Coinage, Weights and Measures	1864 (1867)	18	Financial Services
9	Disposition of Executive Papers	1911	2	House Administration
10	District of Columbia	1808	21	Oversight and Government Reform
11	Education	1867 (1883)	15	Education and the Workforce
12	Election of President, Vice President and Representatives	1893	13	House Administration
13	Elections No. 1	1789 (1895)	9	House Administration
14	Elections No. 2	1895	9	House Administration
15	Elections No. 3	1895	9	House Administration
16	Enrolled Bills	1876	7	House Administration
17	Expenditures in the Agriculture Department	1889	7	Oversight and Government Reform
18	Expenditures in the Commerce Department	1903 (1913)	7	Oversight and Government Reform
19	Expenditures in the Interior Department	1860	7	Oversight and Government Reform
20	Expenditures in the Justice Department	1874	7	Oversight and Government Reform
21	Expenditures in the Labor Department	1913	7	Oversight and Government Reform
22	Expenditures in the Navy Department	1816	7	Oversight and Government Reform
23	Expenditures in the Post Office Department	1816	7	Oversight and Government Reform
24	Expenditures in the State Department	1816	7	Oversight and Government Reform
25	Expenditures in the Treasury Department	1816	7	Oversight and Government Reform
26	Expenditures in the War Department	1816	7	Oversight and Government Reform
27	Expenditures on Public Buildings	1816	7	Oversight and Government Reform
28	Foreign Affairs	1822	21	Foreign Affairs
29	Immigration and Naturalization	1893	15	Judiciary
30	Indian Affairs	1821	19	Natural Resources
31	Industrial Arts and Expositions	1903	16	Foreign Affairs
32	Insular Affairs	1899	21	Natural Resources
33	Interstate and Foreign Commerce	1795 (1892)	21	Energy and Commerce
34	Invalid Pensions	1831	16	Veterans' Affairs
35	Irrigation of Arid Lands	1893	13	Natural Resources
36	Judiciary	1813	21	Judiciary
37	Labor	1883	13	Education and the Workforce
38	Merchant Marine and Fisheries	1887	21	...
39	Mileage	1837	5	House Administration
40	Military Affairs	1822	21	Armed Services
41	Mines and Mining	1865	14	Natural Resources
42	Naval Affairs	1822	21	Armed Services
43	Patents	1837	14	Judiciary
44	Pensions	1880	15	Veterans' Affairs
45	Post Office and Post Roads	1808	21	Oversight and Government Reform
46	Public Buildings and Grounds	1837	20	Transportation and Infrastructure
47	Public Lands	1805	21	Natural Resources
48	Railways and Canals	1831 (1869)	14	Transportation and Infrastructure
49	Reform in the Civil Service	1893	13	Oversight and Government Reform
50	Revision of Laws	1868	13	Judiciary
51	Rivers and Harbors	1883	21	Transportation and Infrastructure
52	Roads	1913	21	Transportation and Infrastructure
53	Rules	1880	12	Rules
54	Territories	1825	17	Natural Resources
55	War Claims	1825 (1873)	15	Judiciary
56	Ways and Means	1802	25	Ways and Means
57	Woman Suffrage	1917	13	...
Joint Committees (House standing committee members only)
Jt 1	Library Joint	1806	5	House Administration
Jt 2	Printing Joint	1846	3	House Administration

== List of representatives by seniority ==
A numerical rank is assigned to each of the 435 members initially elected to the 66th Congress. Other members, who joined the House during the Congress, are not assigned a number. Two representatives-elect died and one resigned before the Congress started. Two died and two resigned after the legal start of the term but before Congress convened. In addition the House did not permit Victor L. Berger (Soc-WI) to take the seat to which he was elected. The list below includes those representatives-elect (with names in italics), with the seniority they would have held if they had been able to be sworn in.

Major party designations used in this article are D for Democratic members and R for Republican representatives. Other designations include Ind for Independent, Proh for Prohibition, Soc for Socialist and UL for Union Labor.

U.S. House seniority
Rank	Representative	Party	District	Seniority date	Notes
Twenty-two non-consecutive terms
1	Joseph G. Cannon	R	IL-18	March 4, 1915	Previously served 1873–91 and 1893–1913 while in the House.
Fourteen consecutive terms
2	Frederick H. Gillett	R	MA-2	March 4, 1893	Dean of the House. Speaker of the House.
Thirteen non-consecutive terms
3	James B. (Champ) Clark	D	MO-9	March 4, 1897	Previously served 1893–95 while in the House. Minority Leader. Died on March 2, 1921, while still serving in the House.
Twelve consecutive terms
4	Thomas S. Butler	R	PA-7	March 4, 1897	Independent Republican, 1897–99. Chairman: Naval Affairs
5	Edward L. Hamilton	R	MI-4	March 4, 1897	Last term while serving in the House.
6	James R. Mann	R	IL-2	March 4, 1897	Chairman: Woman Suffrage
7	John A. Moon	D	TN-3	March 4, 1897	Last term while serving in the House.
8	Thetus W. Sims	D	TN-8	March 4, 1897	Last term while serving in the House.
9	William S. Greene	R	MA-15	May 31, 1898	Chairman: Merchant Marine and Fisheries
Twelve non-consecutive terms
10	Frank W. Mondell	R	WY-al	March 4, 1899	Previously served 1895–97 while in the House. Majority Leader.
Eleven consecutive terms
11	John L. Burnett	D	AL-7	March 4, 1899	Died, as Representative-elect: May 13, 1919
12	John J. Esch	R	WI-7	March 4, 1899	Chairman: Interstate and Foreign Commerce. Last term while serving in the House.
13	Joseph W. Fordney	R	MI-8	March 4, 1899	Chairman: Ways and Means
14	Gilbert N. Haugen	R	IA-4	March 4, 1899	Chairman: Agriculture
15	William W. Rucker	D	MO-2	March 4, 1899	
16	John H. Small	D	NC-1	March 4, 1899	Last term while serving in the House.
Ten consecutive terms
17	Ezekiel S. Candler, Jr.	D	MS-1	March 4, 1901	Last term while serving in the House.
18	Henry D. Flood	D	VA-10	March 4, 1901	
19	Claude Kitchin	D	NC-2	March 4, 1901	
20	Lemuel P. Padgett	D	TN-7	March 4, 1901	
21	Edward W. Pou	D	NC-4	March 4, 1901	
22	Asbury F. Lever	D	SC-7	November 5, 1901	Resigned on August 1, 1919, while still serving in the House.
23	Carter Glass	D	VA-6	November 4, 1902	Resigned as Representative-elect, December 16, 1918
Ten non-consecutive terms
24	Julius Kahn	R	CA-4	March 4, 1905	Previously served 1899–1903. Chairman: Military Affairs.
Nine consecutive terms
25	Philip P. Campbell	R	KS-3	March 4, 1903	Chairman: Rules
26	Charles R. Davis	R	MN-3	March 4, 1903	
27	John N. Garner	D	TX-15	March 4, 1903	
28	Benjamin G. Humphreys	D	MS-3	March 4, 1903	
29	Moses P. Kinkaid	R	NE-6	March 4, 1903	Chairman: Irrigation of Arid Lands
30	Henry T. Rainey	D	IL-20	March 4, 1903	Last term while serving in the House until 68th Congress
31	Halvor Steenerson	R	MN-9	March 4, 1903	Chairman: Post Office and Post Roads
32	Andrew J. Volstead	R	MN-7	March 4, 1903	Chairman: Judiciary
33	Edwin Y. Webb	D	NC-9	March 4, 1903	Resigned, to become US District Judge: November 10, 1919
34	J. Thomas Heflin	D	AL-5	May 19, 1904	Resigned November 1, 1920, while still serving in the House.
Nine non-consecutive terms
35	William A. Rodenberg	R	IL-22	March 4, 1915	Previously served 1899–1901 and 1903–13 while in the House. Chairman: Flood Control.
36	Daniel J. Riordan	D	NY-11	November 6, 1906	Previously served 1899–1901 while in the House.
Eight consecutive terms
37	Thomas M. Bell	D	GA-9	March 4, 1905	
38	Frank Clark	D	FL-2	March 4, 1905	
39	Finis J. Garrett	D	TN-9	March 4, 1905	
40	Gordon Lee	D	GA-7	March 4, 1905	
41	Martin B. Madden	R	IL-1	March 4, 1905	
42	John T. Watkins	D	LA-4	March 4, 1905	Last term while still serving in the House.
43	J. Hampton Moore	R	PA-3	November 6, 1906	Resigned on January 4, 1920, while still serving in the House.
44	Edward W. Saunders	D	VA-5	November 6, 1906	Resigned on February 29, 1920, while still serving in the House.
Eight non-consecutive terms
45	Charles E. Fuller	R	IL-12	March 4, 1915	Previously served 1903–13 while in the House. Chairman: Invalid Pensions.
46	Henry M. Goldfogle	D	NY-12	March 4, 1919	Previously served 1901–15 while in the House. Last term while serving in the House.
47	Nicholas Longworth	R	OH-1	March 4, 1915	Previously served 1903–13 while in the House.
48	Isaac R. Sherwood	D	OH-9	March 4, 1907	Previously served (R) 1873–75 while in the House. Last term while serving in the House until 68th Congress.
49	William W. Wilson	R	IL-3	March 4, 1915	Previously served 1903–13 while in the House. Last term.
50	Charles F. Booher	D	MO-4	March 4, 1907	Previously served February 19-March 3, 1889, while in the House. Died on January 21, 1921, while still serving in the House.
Seven consecutive terms
51	Joshua W. Alexander	D	MO-3	March 4, 1907	Resigned, to become Secretary of Commerce: December 15, 1919
52	William A. Ashbrook	D	OH-17	March 4, 1907	Last term while serving in the House until 74th Congress
53	Hannibal L. Godwin	D	NC-6	March 4, 1907	Last term while serving in the House.
54	James A. Hamill	D	NJ-12	March 4, 1907	Last term while serving in the House.
55	Rufus Hardy	D	TX-6	March 4, 1907	
56	Willis C. Hawley	R	OR-1	March 4, 1907	
57	Harvey Helm	D	KY-8	March 4, 1907	Died, as Representative-elect, March 3, 1919
58	Cordell Hull	D	TN-4	March 4, 1907	Last term while serving in the House until 68th Congress
59	Ben Johnson	D	KY-4	March 4, 1907	
60	Charles A. Kennedy	R	IA-1	March 4, 1907	Chairman: Rivers and Harbors. Last term while serving in the House.
61	John W. Langley	R	KY-10	March 4, 1907	Chairman: Public Buildings and Grounds
62	James C. McLaughlin	R	MI-9	March 4, 1907	
63	Adolph J. Sabath	D	IL-5	March 4, 1907	
64	Daniel R. Anthony, Jr.	R	KS-1	May 23, 1907	
65	Charles C. Carlin	D	VA-8	November 5, 1907	Resigned, as Representative-elect: March 3, 1919
66	Charles D. Carter	D	OK-3	November 16, 1907	
67	Scott Ferris	D	OK-6	November 16, 1907	Last term while serving in the House.
68	C. Bascom Slemp	R	VA-9	December 17, 1907	
69	Albert Estopinal	D	LA-1	November 3, 1908	Died, as Representative-elect: April 28, 1919
Seven non-consecutive terms
70	Burton L. French	R	ID-1	March 4, 1917	Previously served 1903–09 and 1911–15 while in the House.
71	William B. McKinley	R	IL-19	March 4, 1915	Previously served 1905–13 while in the House. Last term while serving in the House.
72	Harry C. Woodyard	R	WV-4	November 7, 1916	Previously served 1903–11 while in the House.
Six consecutive terms
73	Joseph W. Byrns	D	TN-6	March 4, 1909	
74	J. Campbell Cantrill	D	KY-7	March 4, 1909	
75	James W. Collier	D	MS-8	March 4, 1909	
76	S. Hubert Dent, Jr.	D	AL-2	March 4, 1909	Last term while serving in the House.
77	Thomas Gallagher	D	IL-8	March 4, 1909	Last term while serving in the House.
78	James W. Good	R	IA-5	March 4, 1909	Chairman: Appropriations
79	William W. Griest	R	PA-9	March 4, 1909	
80	Dick T. Morgan	R	OK-8	March 4, 1909	Died on July 4, 1920, while serving in the House.
81	William A. Oldfield	D	AR-2	March 4, 1909	
82	Thomas U. Sisson	D	MS-4	March 4, 1909	
83	Edward T. Taylor	D	CO-4	March 4, 1909	
84	Robert Y. Thomas, Jr.	D	KY-3	March 4, 1909	
85	Clement C. Dickinson	D	MO-6	February 1, 1910	Last term while serving in the House until 68th Congress
86	H. Garland Dupré	D	LA-2	November 8, 1910	
Six non-consecutive terms
87	Benjamin K. Focht	R	PA-17	March 4, 1915	Previously served 1907–13 while in the House. Chairman: War Claims.
88	James McAndrews	D	IL-6	March 4, 1913	Previously served 1901–05 while in the House. Last term while serving in the House until 74th Congress.
Five consecutive terms
89	Sydney Anderson	R	MN-1	March 4, 1911	
90	Fred L. Blackmon	D	AL-4	March 4, 1911	Died on February 8, 1921, while still serving in the House.
91	James F. Byrnes	D	SC-2	March 4, 1911	
92	Ira C. Copley	R	IL-11	March 4, 1911	Progressive 1915–17 while in the House.
93	Frank E. Doremus	D	MI-1	March 4, 1911	Last term while still serving in the House.
94	Robert L. Doughton	D	NC-8	March 4, 1911	
95	William J. Fields	D	KY-9	March 4, 1911	
96	William S. Goodwin	D	AR-7	March 4, 1911	Last term while still serving in the House.
97	Edward E. Holland	D	VA-2	March 4, 1911	Last term while still serving in the House.
98	Henderson M. Jacoway	D	AR-5	March 4, 1911	
99	J. Charles Linthicum	D	MD-4	March 4, 1911	
100	James P. Maher	D	NY-7	March 4, 1911	Last term while still serving in the House.
101	John C. McKenzie	R	IL-13	March 4, 1911	
102	Luther W. Mott	R	NY-32	March 4, 1911	
103	Stephen G. Porter	R	PA-29	March 4, 1911	Chairman: Foreign Affairs
104	John E. Raker	D	CA-2	March 4, 1911	
105	Arthur B. Rouse	D	KY-6	March 4, 1911	
106	Thomas L. Rubey	D	MO-16	March 4, 1911	Last term while still serving in the House until 68th Congress
107	Thomas J. Scully	D	NJ-3	March 4, 1911	Last term while still serving in the House.
108	Sam R. Sells	R	TN-1	March 4, 1911	Chairman: Pensions. Last term.
109	John M. C. Smith	R	MI-3	March 4, 1911	Chairman: Labor. Last term until seated in 67th Congress.
110	Charles M. Stedman	D	NC-5	March 4, 1911	
111	Hubert D. Stephens	D	MS-2	March 4, 1911	Last term while still serving in the House.
112	Horace M. Towner	R	IA-8	March 4, 1911	Republican Conference Chairman. Chairman: Insular Affairs.
113	James Young	D	TX-3	March 4, 1911	Last term while still serving in the House.
114	William R. Green	R	IA-9	June 5, 1911	
115	Leonidas C. Dyer	R	MO-12	March 4, 1915	Previously served 1911-June 19, 1914, while in the House.
116	William J. Browning	R	NJ-1	November 7, 1911	Died on March 24, 1920, while still serving in the House.
117	Carl T. Hayden	D	AZ-al	February 19, 1912	
118	William S. Vare	R	PA-1	May 24, 1912	
119	Frank L. Greene	R	VT-1	July 30, 1912	
120	Samuel M. Taylor	D	AR-6	January 15, 1913	
Five non-consecutive terms
121	John Q. Tilson	R	CT-3	March 4, 1915	Previously served 1909–13 while in the House.
122	Charles R. Crisp	D	GA-3	March 4, 1913	Previously served December 19, 1896–97 while in the House.
Four consecutive terms
123	James B. Aswell	D	LA-8	March 4, 1913	
124	Alben W. Barkley	D	KY-1	March 4, 1913	
125	Frederick A. Britten	R	IL-9	March 4, 1913	
126	Edward E. Browne	R	WI-8	March 4, 1913	
127	Clement L. Brumbaugh	D	OH-12	March 4, 1913	Last term while still serving in the House.
128	Thaddeus H. Caraway	D	AR-1	March 4, 1913	Last term while still serving in the House.
129	John F. Carew	D	NY-18	March 4, 1913	
130	Louis C. Cramton	R	MI-7	March 4, 1913	
131	Charles F. Curry	R	CA-3	March 4, 1913	Chairman: Territories
132	Peter J. Dooling	D	NY-15	March 4, 1913	Last term while still serving in the House.
133	Thomas B. Dunn	R	NY-38	March 4, 1913	Chairman: Roads
134	John J. Eagan	D	NJ-11	March 4, 1913	Last term while still serving in the House until 68th Congress
135	Joe H. Eagle	D	TX-8	March 4, 1913	Last term while still serving in the House until 72nd Congress
136	George W. Edmonds	R	PA-4	March 4, 1913	Chairman: Claims
137	John M. Evans	D	MT-1	March 4, 1913	Last term while still serving in the House until 68th Congress
138	Simeon D. Fess	R	OH-7	March 4, 1913	Chairman: Education
139	James A. Frear	R	WI-10	March 4, 1913	
140	Warren Gard	D	OH-3	March 4, 1913	Last term while still serving in the House.
141	George S. Graham	R	PA-2	March 4, 1913	
142	William L. Igoe	D	MO-11	March 4, 1913	Last term while still serving in the House.
143	Albert Johnson	R	WA-3	March 4, 1913	Chairman: Immigration and Naturalization
144	Patrick H. Kelley	R	MI-6	March 4, 1913	
145	Ambrose Kennedy	R	RI-3	March 4, 1913	
146	William Kettner	D	CA-11	March 4, 1913	Last term while still serving in the House.
147	Edgar R. Kiess	R	PA-15	March 4, 1913	
148	Aaron S. Kreider	R	PA-18	March 4, 1913	Chairman: Expenditures in the Interior Department
149	Ladislas Lazaro	D	LA-7	March 4, 1913	
150	John V. Lesher	D	PA-16	March 4, 1913	Last term while still serving in the House.
151	Carl E. Mapes	R	MI-5	March 4, 1913	Chairman: District of Columbia
152	Andrew J. Montague	D	VA-3	March 4, 1913	
153	John M. Morin	R	PA-31	March 4, 1913	
154	John I. Nolan	R	CA-5	March 4, 1913	Chairman: Patents
155	James S. Parker	R	NY-29	March 4, 1913	
156	Michael F. Phelan	D	MA-7	March 4, 1913	Last term while still serving in the House.
157	Edmund Platt	R	NY-26	March 4, 1913	Chairman: Banking and Currency. Resigned on June 7, 1920, while still serving in the House.
158	Percy E. Quin	D	MS-7	March 4, 1913	
159	J. Willard Ragsdale	D	SC-6	March 4, 1913	Died on July 23, 1919, while still serving in the House.
160	Sam Rayburn	D	TX-4	March 4, 1913	
161	John J. Rogers	R	MA-5	March 4, 1913	
162	Nicholas J. Sinnott	R	OR-2	March 4, 1913	Chairman: Public Lands
163	Addison T. Smith	R	ID-2	March 4, 1913	Chairman: Alcohol Liquor Traffic
164	Hatton W. Sumners	D	TX-5	March 4, 1913	
165	Joseph B. Thompson	D	OK-5	March 4, 1913	Died on September 18, 1919, while still serving in the House.
166	Allen T. Treadway	R	MA-1	March 4, 1913	
167	Walter A. Watson	D	VA-4	March 4, 1913	Died on December 24, 1919, while still serving in the House.
168	Otis T. Wingo	D	AR-4	March 4, 1913	
169	Samuel E. Winslow	R	MA-4	March 4, 1913	
170	George M. Young	R	ND-2	March 4, 1913	
171	James P. Buchanan	D	TX-10	April 15, 1913	
172	Richard S. Whaley	D	SC-1	April 29, 1913	Last term while serving in the House.
173	John A. Peters	R	ME-3	September 9, 1913	
174	Matthew M. Neely	D	WV-1	October 14, 1913	Last term while serving in the House until 79th Congress
175	Charles P. Coady	D	MD-3	November 4, 1913	Last term while serving in the House.
176	Calvin D. Paige	R	MA-3	November 4, 1913	
177	Frank Park	D	GA-2	November 4, 1913	
178	James A. Gallivan	D	MA-12	April 7, 1914	
179	Henry W. Temple	R	PA-24	November 2, 1915	Previously served (Progressive) 1913–15 while in the House.
180	Carl Vinson	D	GA-10	November 3, 1914	
Four non-consecutive terms
181	Thomas S. Crago	R	PA-al	March 4, 1915	Previously served 1911–13 while in the House. Last term while serving in the House until seated in 67th Congress.
182	John F. Fitzgerald	D	MA-10	March 4, 1919	Previously served 1895–1901 while in the House. Unseated, after election challenge: October 23, 1919.
183	William E. Mason	R	IL-al	March 4, 1917	Previously served 1887–91 while in the House.
Three consecutive terms
184	Edward B. Almon	D	AL-8	March 4, 1915	
185	William A. Ayres	D	KS-8	March 4, 1915	Last term while still serving in the House until 68th Congress
186	Isaac Bacharach	R	NJ-2	March 4, 1915	
187	Eugene Black	D	TX-1	March 4, 1915	
188	C. Pope Caldwell	D	NY-2	March 4, 1915	Last term while still serving in the House.
189	John G. Cooper	R	OH-19	March 4, 1915	
190	Peter E. Costello	R	PA-5	March 4, 1915	Last term while still serving in the House.
191	Porter H. Dale	R	VT-2	March 4, 1915	Chairman: Expenditures in the Treasury Department
192	Frederick W. Dallinger	R	MA-8	March 4, 1915	Chairman: Elections No. 1
193	George P. Darrow	R	PA-6	March 4, 1915	
194	S. Wallace Dempsey	R	NY-40	March 4, 1915	
195	Edward E. Denison	R	IL-25	March 4, 1915	
196	Arthur G. Dewalt	D	PA-13	March 4, 1915	Democratic Caucus Chairman. Last term while serving in the House.
197	Cassius C. Dowell	R	IA-7	March 4, 1915	Chairman: Elections No. 3
198	Franklin Ellsworth	R	MN-2	March 4, 1915	Last term while serving in the House.
199	John A. Elston	R	CA-6	March 4, 1915	Progressive 1915–17; Republican and Progressive candidate: 1916 election. Chairman: Mileage.
200	Henry I. Emerson	R	OH-22	March 4, 1915	Last term while serving in the House.
201	Richard P. Freeman	R	CT-2	March 4, 1915	
202	Harry L. Gandy	D	SD-3	March 4, 1915	Last term while serving in the House.
203	Mahlon M. Garland	R	PA-al	March 4, 1915	Chairman: Mines and Mining. Died on November 19, 1920, while still serving in the House.
204	James P. Glynn	R	CT-5	March 4, 1915	
205	Lindley H. Hadley	R	WA-2	March 4, 1915	
206	Reuben L. Haskell	R	NY-10	March 4, 1915	Chairman: Expenditures in the Navy Department. Resigned on December 31, 1919, while still serving in the House.
207	William W. Hastings	D	OK-2	March 4, 1915	Last term while serving in the House until 68th Congress
208	Frederick C. Hicks	R	NY-1	March 4, 1915	
209	George Huddleston	D	AL-9	March 4, 1915	
210	Harry E. Hull	R	IA-2	March 4, 1915	
211	James W. Husted	R	NY-25	March 4, 1915	
212	Elijah C. Hutchinson	R	NJ-4	March 4, 1915	
213	W. Frank James	R	MI-12	March 4, 1915	
214	Royal C. Johnson	R	SD-2	March 4, 1915	
215	Charles C. Kearns	R	OH-6	March 4, 1915	
216	David H. Kincheloe	D	KY-2	March 4, 1915	
217	Edward J. King	R	IL-15	March 4, 1915	
218	Frederick R. Lehlbach	R	NJ-10	March 4, 1915	Chairman: Reform in the Civil Service
219	Walter W. Magee	R	NY-35	March 4, 1915	
220	Whitmell P. Martin	D	LA-3	March 4, 1915	Progressive 1915–19
221	James H. Mays	D	UT-2	March 4, 1915	Last term while serving in the House.
222	Clifton N. McArthur	R	OR-3	March 4, 1915	
223	James V. McClintic	D	OK-7	March 4, 1915	
224	Roscoe C. McCulloch	R	OH-16	March 4, 1915	Last term while serving in the House.
225	Louis T. McFadden	R	PA-14	March 4, 1915	Chairman: Banking and Currency (1920)
226	Merrill Moores	R	IN-7	March 4, 1915	
227	Sydney E. Mudd II	R	MD-5	March 4, 1915	
228	Charles A. Nichols	R	MI-13	March 4, 1915	Chairman: Census. Died April 25, 1920, while serving in the House.
229	William B. Oliver	D	AL-6	March 4, 1915	
230	Richard Olney II	D	MA-14	March 4, 1915	Last term while serving in the House.
231	C. William Ramseyer	R	IA-6	March 4, 1915	
232	Charles H. Randall	Proh	CA-9	March 4, 1915	Prohibition. Last term while serving in the House.
233	C. Frank Reavis	R	NE-1	March 4, 1915	
234	Frederick W. Rowe	R	NY-6	March 4, 1915	Last term while serving in the House.
235	Rollin B. Sanford	R	NY-28	March 4, 1915	Last term while serving in the House.
236	Thomas D. Schall	R	MN-10	March 4, 1915	
237	Frank D. Scott	R	MI-11	March 4, 1915	
238	William J. Sears	D	FL-4	March 4, 1915	
239	Isaac Siegel	R	NY-20	March 4, 1915	Chairman: Census (1920)
240	Homer P. Snyder	R	NY-33	March 4, 1915	Chairman: Indian Affairs
241	Henry B. Steagall	D	AL-3	March 4, 1915	
242	Henry J. Steele	D	PA-26	March 4, 1915	Last term while serving in the House.
243	Walter R. Stiness	R	RI-2	March 4, 1915	
244	Burton E. Sweet	R	IA-3	March 4, 1915	
245	John N. Tillman	D	AR-3	March 4, 1915	
246	Charles B. Timberlake	R	CO-2	March 4, 1915	
247	George H. Tinkham	R	MA-11	March 4, 1915	
248	Carl Van Dyke	D	MN-4	March 4, 1915	Died on May 20, 1919, while still serving in the House.
249	Joseph Walsh	R	MA-16	March 4, 1915	
250	Charles B. Ward	R	NY-27	March 4, 1915	
251	Edward H. Wason	R	NH-2	March 4, 1915	
252	Henry W. Watson	R	PA-8	March 4, 1915	
253	Loren E. Wheeler	R	IL-21	March 4, 1915	Chairman: Railways and Canals
254	Thomas S. Williams	R	IL-24	March 4, 1915	Chairman: Expenditures in the Commerce Department
255	Riley J. Wilson	D	LA-5	March 4, 1915	
256	James W. Wise	D	GA-6	March 4, 1915	
257	William R. Wood	R	IN-10	March 4, 1915	
258	Samuel J. Nicholls	D	SC-4	September 14, 1915	Last term while serving in the House.
259	Norman J. Gould	R	NY-36	November 2, 1915	
260	Bertrand H. Snell	R	NY-31	November 2, 1915	
261	William W. Venable	D	MS-5	January 4, 1916	Last term while serving in the House.
262	George M. Bowers	R	WV-2	May 9, 1916	
263	Thomas W. Harrison	D	VA-7	November 7, 1916	
Three non-consecutive terms
264	John J. Casey	D	PA-11	March 4, 1919	Previously served 1913–17 while in the House. Last term while serving in the House until 68th Congress
265	M. Clyde Kelly	R	PA-30	March 4, 1917	Previously served (Republican) 1913–15 while in the House. Progressive 1917–19.
266	Augustine Lonergan	D	CT-1	March 4, 1917	Previously served 1913–15 while in the House. Last term until 72nd Congress while serving in the House.
267	Edward E. Robbins	R	PA-22	March 4, 1917	Previously served 1897–99 while in the House. Died, as Representative-elect: January 25, 1919.
268	James W. Overstreet	D	GA-1	March 4, 1917	Previously served October 3, 1906–07 while in the House.
Two consecutive terms
269	William B. Bankhead	D	AL-10	March 4, 1917	
270	Oscar E. Bland	R	IN-2	March 4, 1917	Chairman: Industrial Arts and Expositions
271	Thomas L. Blanton	D	TX-17	March 4, 1917	
272	Charles H. Brand	D	GA-8	March 4, 1917	First elected January 11, 1917 (before the start of the 65th Congress)
273	Guy E. Campbell	D	PA-32	March 4, 1917	
274	David G. Classon	R	WI-9	March 4, 1917	
275	Tom T. Connally	D	TX-11	March 4, 1917	
276	Gilbert A. Currie	R	MI-10	March 4, 1917	Last term while serving in the House.
277	Frederick H. Dominick	D	SC-3	March 4, 1917	
278	Herbert J. Drane	D	FL-1	March 4, 1917	
279	Louis W. Fairfield	R	IN-12	March 4, 1917	
280	Hubert F. Fisher	D	TN-10	March 4, 1917	
281	Alvan T. Fuller	R	MA-9	March 4, 1917	Independent Republican 1917–19. Resigned on January 5, 1921, while still serving in the House.
282	Louis B. Goodall	R	ME-1	March 4, 1917	Chairman: Elections No. 2. Last term while serving in the House.
283	William J. Graham	R	IL-14	March 4, 1917	Chairman: Expenditures in the War Department
284	Ira G. Hersey	R	ME-4	March 4, 1917	Chairman: Expenditures on Public Buildings
285	Clifford C. Ireland	R	IL-16	March 4, 1917	Chairman: Accounts
286	John M. Jones	D	TX-18	March 4, 1917	
287	Niels Juul	R	IL-7	March 4, 1917	Last term while serving in the House.
288	Harold Knutson	R	MN-6	March 4, 1917	Majority Whip
289	Milton Kraus	R	IN-11	March 4, 1917	
290	Fiorello H. La Guardia	R	NY-14	March 4, 1917	Resigned on December 31, 1919, while still serving in the House. Last term while serving in the House until 68th Congress
291	William W. Larsen	D	GA-12	March 4, 1917	
292	Clarence F. Lea	D	CA-1	March 4, 1917	
293	Edward C. Little	R	KS-2	March 4, 1917	Chairman: Revision of Laws
294	Joseph J. Mansfield	D	TX-9	March 4, 1917	
295	Thomas D. McKeown	D	OK-4	March 4, 1917	Last term while serving in the House until 68th Congress
296	John F. Miller	R	WA-1	March 4, 1917	
297	Henry Z. Osborne	R	CA-10	March 4, 1917	
298	Fred S. Purnell	R	IN-9	March 4, 1917	
299	John R. Ramsey	R	NJ-6	March 4, 1917	Last term while serving in the House.
300	Stuart F. Reed	R	WV-3	March 4, 1917	
301	Leonidas D. Robinson	D	NC-7	March 4, 1917	Last term while serving in the House.
302	Milton A. Romjue	D	MO-1	March 4, 1917	Last term while serving in the House until 68th Congress
303	John M. Rose	R	PA-19	March 4, 1917	
304	Archie D. Sanders	R	NY-39	March 4, 1917	
305	Everett Sanders	R	IN-5	March 4, 1917	
306	Jared Y. Sanders, Sr.	D	LA-6	March 4, 1917	Last term while serving in the House.
307	William F. Stevenson	D	SC-5	March 4, 1917	First elected February 21, 1917 (before the start of the 65th Congress)
308	Nathan L. Strong	R	PA-27	March 4, 1917	
309	Christopher D. Sullivan	D	NY-13	March 4, 1917	
310	Albert H. Vestal	R	IN-8	March 4, 1917	Chairman: Coinage, Weights and Measures
311	Edward Voigt	R	WI-2	March 4, 1917	
312	Milton H. Welling	D	UT-1	March 4, 1917	Last term while serving in the House.
313	Benjamin F. Welty	D	OH-4	March 4, 1917	Last term while serving in the House.
314	Wallace H. White, Jr.	R	ME-2	March 4, 1917	Chairman: Expenditures in the Justice Department
315	James C. Wilson	D	TX-12	March 4, 1917	Resigned, as Representative-elect, to become US District Judge: March 3, 1919
316	Frederick N. Zihlman	R	MD-6	March 4, 1917	Chairman: Expenditures in the Post Office Department
317	Zebulon Weaver	D	NC-10	March 4, 1919	Previously served 1917-March 1, 1919, while in the House.
318	Thomas F. Smith	D	NY-16	April 12, 1917	Last term while serving in the House.
319	Sherman E. Burroughs	R	NH-1	May 29, 1917	
320	Richard N. Elliott	R	IN-6	June 29, 1917	Chairman: Expenditures in the State Department
321	John M. Baer	R	ND-1	July 20, 1917	Chairman: Expenditures in the Agriculture Department. Last term while serving in the House.
322	Willfred W. Lufkin	R	MA-6	November 6, 1917	
323	Schuyler Merritt	R	CT-4	November 6, 1917	
324	William C. Wright	D	GA-4	January 16, 1918	
325	William E. Cleary	D	NY-8	March 5, 1918	Last term while serving in the House until 68th Congress
326	Jerome F. Donovan	D	NY-21	March 5, 1918	Last term while serving in the House.
327	Anthony J. Griffin	D	NY-22	March 5, 1918	
328	John W. Rainey	D	IL-4	April 2, 1918	
329	S. Otis Bland	D	VA-1	July 2, 1918	
330	Carville D. Benson	D	MD-2	November 5, 1918	Last term while serving in the House.
331	Martin L. Davey	D	OH-14	November 5, 1918	Last term while serving in the House until 68th Congress
332	Florian Lampert	R	WI-6	November 5, 1918	Chairman: Election of President, Vice President and Representatives
333	Adolphus P. Nelson	R	WI-11	November 5, 1918	
334	James P. Woods	D	VA-6	February 25, 1919	
Two non-consecutive terms
335	William E. Andrews	R	NE-5	March 4, 1919	Previously served 1895–97 while in the House.
336	Victor L. Berger	Soc	WI-5	March 4, 1919	Previously served 1911–13 while in the House. Representative-elect declared not entitled to take oath and seat declared vacant November 10, 1919.
337	Benigno C. Hernández	R	NM-al	March 4, 1919	Previously served 1915–17 while in the House. Last term.
338	Willis J. Hulings	R	PA-28	March 4, 1919	Previously served (Progressive) 1913–15 while in the House. Last term while serving in the House.
339	Marion E. Rhodes	R	MO-13	March 4, 1919	Previously served 1905–07 while in the House.
340	Edwin D. Ricketts	R	OH-11	March 4, 1919	Previously served 1915–17 while in the House.
341	Milton W. Shreve	R	PA-25	March 4, 1919	Previously served 1913–15 while in the House.
342	Anderson H. Walters	R	PA-al	March 4, 1919	Previously served 1913–15 while in the House. Chairman: Expenditures in the Labor Department.
One term
343	Ernest R. Ackerman	R	NJ-5	March 4, 1919	
344	William N. Andrews	R	MD-1	March 4, 1919	Only term while serving in the House.
345	John J. Babka	D	OH-21	March 4, 1919	Only term while serving in the House.
346	Henry E. Barbour	R	CA-7	March 4, 1919	
347	Carlos Bee	D	TX-14	March 4, 1919	Only term while serving in the House.
348	James T. Begg	R	OH-13	March 4, 1919	
349	John S. Benham	R	IN-4	March 4, 1919	
350	William T. Bland	D	MO-5	March 4, 1919	Only term while serving in the House.
351	William D. Boies	R	IA-11	March 4, 1919	
352	John C. Box	D	TX-2	March 4, 1919	
353	Clay S. Briggs	D	TX-7	March 4, 1919	
354	Samuel M. Brinson	D	NC-3	March 4, 1919	
355	Edward S. Brooks	R	PA-20	March 4, 1919	
356	Edwin B. Brooks	R	IL-23	March 4, 1919	
357	Clark Burdick	R	RI-1	March 4, 1919	
358	William J. Burke	R	PA-al	March 4, 1919	
359	William L. Carss	UL	MN-8	March 4, 1919	Union Labor. Only term while serving in the House until 69th Congress
360	Carl R. Chindblom	R	IL-10	March 4, 1919	
361	Charles A. Christopherson	R	SD-1	March 4, 1919	
362	R. Clint Cole	R	OH-8	March 4, 1919	
363	Frank Crowther	R	NY-30	March 4, 1919	
364	Thomas H. Cullen	D	NY-4	March 4, 1919	
365	Ewin L. Davis	D	TN-5	March 4, 1919	
366	Lester J. Dickinson	R	IA-10	March 4, 1919	
367	James W. Dunbar	R	IN-3	March 4, 1919	
368	Leonard S. Echols	R	WV-6	March 4, 1919	Chairman: Expenditures in the Navy Department (1920)
369	Charles R. Evans	D	NV-al	March 4, 1919	Only term while serving in the House.
370	Robert E. Evans	R	NE-3	March 4, 1919	
371	Israel M. Foster	R	OH-10	March 4, 1919	
372	James V. Ganly	D	NY-24	March 4, 1919	Only term while serving in the House until 68th Congress
373	Wells Goodykoontz	R	WV-5	March 4, 1919	
374	Guy U. Hardy	R	CO-3	March 4, 1919	
375	Edward D. Hays	R	MO-14	March 4, 1919	
376	Hugh S. Hersman	D	CA-8	March 4, 1919	Only term while serving in the House.
377	Andrew J. Hickey	R	IN-13	March 4, 1919	
378	William H. Hill	R	NY-34	March 4, 1919	Only term while serving in the House.
379	Homer Hoch	R	KS-4	March 4, 1919	
380	Alanson B. Houghton	R	NY-37	March 4, 1919	
381	Everette B. Howard	D	OK-1	March 4, 1919	Only term while serving in the House until 68th Congress
382	Claude B. Hudspeth	D	TX-16	March 4, 1919	
383	Albert W. Jefferis	R	NE-2	March 4, 1919	
384	Paul B. Johnson, Sr.	D	MS-6	March 4, 1919	
385	John B. Johnston	D	NY-5	March 4, 1919	Only term while serving in the House.
386	Evan J. Jones	R	PA-21	March 4, 1919	
387	Samuel A. Kendall	R	PA-23	March 4, 1919	
388	John C. Kleczka	R	WI-4	March 4, 1919	
389	William C. Lankford	D	GA-11	March 4, 1919	
390	Caleb R. Layton	R	DE-al	March 4, 1919	
391	Robert Luce	R	MA-13	March 4, 1919	
392	Oscar R. Luhring	R	IN-1	March 4, 1919	
393	John MacCrate	R	NY-3	March 4, 1919	Resigned on December 30, 1920, while still serving in the House.
394	Clarence MacGregor	R	NY-41	March 4, 1919	
395	Samuel C. Major	D	MO-7	March 4, 1919	Only term while serving in the House until 68th Congress
396	Cornelius A. McGlennon	D	NJ-8	March 4, 1919	Only term while serving in the House.
397	John McDuffie	D	AL-1	March 4, 1919	
398	Richard F. McKiniry	D	NY-23	March 4, 1919	Only term while serving in the House.
399	Patrick McLane	D	PA-10	March 4, 1919	Unseated after election contest: February 25, 1921. Only term while serving in the House.
400	Melvin O. McLaughlin	R	NE-4	March 4, 1919	
401	Isaac V. McPherson	R	MO-15	March 4, 1919	
402	James M. Mead	D	NY-42	March 4, 1919	
403	Earl C. Michener	R	MI-2	March 4, 1919	
404	Daniel F. Minahan	D	NJ-9	March 4, 1919	Only term while serving until 68th Congress
405	James G. Monahan	R	WI-3	March 4, 1919	Only term while serving in the House.
406	Charles A. Mooney	D	OH-20	March 4, 1919	Only term while serving in the House.
407	C. Ellis Moore	R	OH-15	March 4, 1919	
408	B. Frank Murphy	R	OH-18	March 4, 1919	
409	William L. Nelson	D	MO-8	March 4, 1919	Only term while serving in the House until 69th Congress
410	Cleveland A. Newton	R	MO-10	March 4, 1919	
411	Walter H. Newton	R	MN-5	March 4, 1919	
412	David J. O'Connell	D	NY-9	March 4, 1919	Only term while serving in the House until 68th Congress
413	Charles F. Ogden	R	KY-5	March 4, 1919	
414	Lucian W. Parrish	D	TX-13	March 4, 1919	
415	Herbert C. Pell, Jr.	D	NY-17	March 4, 1919	Only term while serving in the House.
416	Amos H. Radcliffe	R	NJ-7	March 4, 1919	
417	Clifford E. Randall	R	WI-1	March 4, 1919	Only term while serving in the House.
418	John Reber	R	PA-12	March 4, 1919	
419	Daniel A. Reed	R	NY-43	March 4, 1919	
420	Carl W. Riddick	R	MT-2	March 4, 1919	
421	John M. Robsion	R	KY-11	March 4, 1919	
422	Joseph Rowan	D	NY-19	March 4, 1919	Only term while serving in the House.
423	James H. Sinclair	R	ND-3	March 4, 1919	
424	Frank L. Smith	R	IL-17	March 4, 1919	Only term while serving in the House.
425	John H. Smithwick	D	FL-3	March 4, 1919	
426	Ambrose E.B. Stephens	R	OH-2	March 4, 1919	
427	James G. Strong	R	KS-5	March 4, 1919	
428	John W. Summers	R	WA-4	March 4, 1919	
429	J. Will Taylor	R	TN-2	March 4, 1919	
430	Charles J. Thompson	R	OH-5	March 4, 1919	
431	Jasper N. Tincher	R	KS-7	March 4, 1919	
432	William D. Upshaw	D	GA-5	March 4, 1919	
433	William N. Vaile	R	CO-1	March 4, 1919	
434	J. Stanley Webster	R	WA-5	March 4, 1919	
435	Hays B. White	R	KS-6	March 4, 1919	
436	John H. Wilson	D	PA-22	March 4, 1919	Special election before start of the term. Only term.
437	Richard Yates	R	IL-al	March 4, 1919	
Members joining the House, after the start of the Congress
...	Fritz G. Lanham	D	TX-12	April 19, 1919	Special election
...	R. Walton Moore	D	VA-8	April 27, 1919	Special election
...	James O'Connor	D	LA-1	June 5, 1919	Special election
...	Oscar E. Keller	Ind R	MN-4	July 1, 1919	Special election. Independent Republican.
...	King Swope	R	KY-8	August 1, 1919	Special election. Only term while serving in the House.
...	Lilius B. Rainey	D	AL-7	September 30, 1919	Special election
...	Philip H. Stoll	D	SC-6	October 7, 1919	Special election
...	Edward C. Mann	D	SC-7	October 7, 1919	Special election. Only term while serving in the House.
...	Peter F. Tague	D	MA-10	October 23, 1919	Previously served 1915–19 while in the House. Seated after election contest.
...	John W. Harreld	R	OK-5	November 8, 1919	Special election. Only term while serving in the House.
...	Clyde R. Hoey	D	NC-9	December 16, 1919	Special election. Only term while serving in the House.
...	Victor L. Berger	Soc	WI-5	December 19, 1919	Previously served 1911–13 and March 4-November 10, 1919, while in the House. Special election. Representative-elect declared not entitled to take seat (January 10, 1920) and seat declared vacant February 25, 1921. Last term while serving in the House until 68th Congress
...	Jacob L. Milligan	D	MO-3	February 14, 1920	Special election. Only term while serving in the House until 68th Congress
...	Patrick H. Drewry	D	VA-4	April 27, 1920	Special election
...	Rorer A. James	D	VA-5	June 1, 1920	Special election
...	Hamilton Fish III	R	NY-26	November 2, 1920	Special election
...	Clarence J. McLeod	R	MI-13	November 2, 1920	Special election. Only term while serving in the House until 68th Congress
...	Francis F. Patterson, Jr.	R	NJ-1	November 2, 1920	Special election
...	Nathan D. Perlman	R	NY-14	November 2, 1920	Special election
...	Harry C. Ransley	R	PA-3	November 2, 1920	Special election
...	Charles Swindall	R	OK-8	November 2, 1920	Special election. Only term while serving in the House.
...	Lester D. Volk	R	NY-10	November 2, 1920	Special election
...	William B. Bowling	D	AL-5	December 14, 1920	Special election
...	John R. Farr	R	PA-10	February 25, 1921	Previously served 1911–19 while in the House. Seated after election contest. Last term while serving in the House.
Non voting members
a	Jonah K. Kalaniana'ole	R	HI-al	March 4, 1903	Territorial Delegate
b	Jaime C. De Veyra	N	PI-al	March 4, 1917	Resident Commissioner. Nationalist Party (PI).
c	Teodoro R. Yangco	N	PI-al	March 4, 1917	Resident Commissioner. Nationalist Party (PI). Served to March 3, 1920.
d	Félix Córdova Dávila	U	PR-al	August 7, 1917	Resident Commissioner. Unionist Party (PR).
e	Charles A. Sulzer	D	AK-al	March 4, 1919	Territorial Delegate. Previously served 1917-January 7, 1919. Died, as Delegate-elect: April 15, 1919.
f	Isauro Gabaldon	N	PI-al	March 4, 1920	Resident Commissioner. Nationalist Party (PI).
g	George B. Grigsby	D	AK-al	June 3, 1920	Territorial Delegate. Unseated after election contest: March 1, 1921.
h	James Wickersham	R	AK-al	March 1, 1921	Territorial Delegate. Previously served 1909–17 and January 7-March 3, 1919. Seated after election contest. Last term until 72nd Congress.

== See also ==
- 66th United States Congress
- List of United States congressional districts
- List of United States senators in the 66th Congress
