= 1938 Oklahoma gubernatorial election =

- November 8, 1938
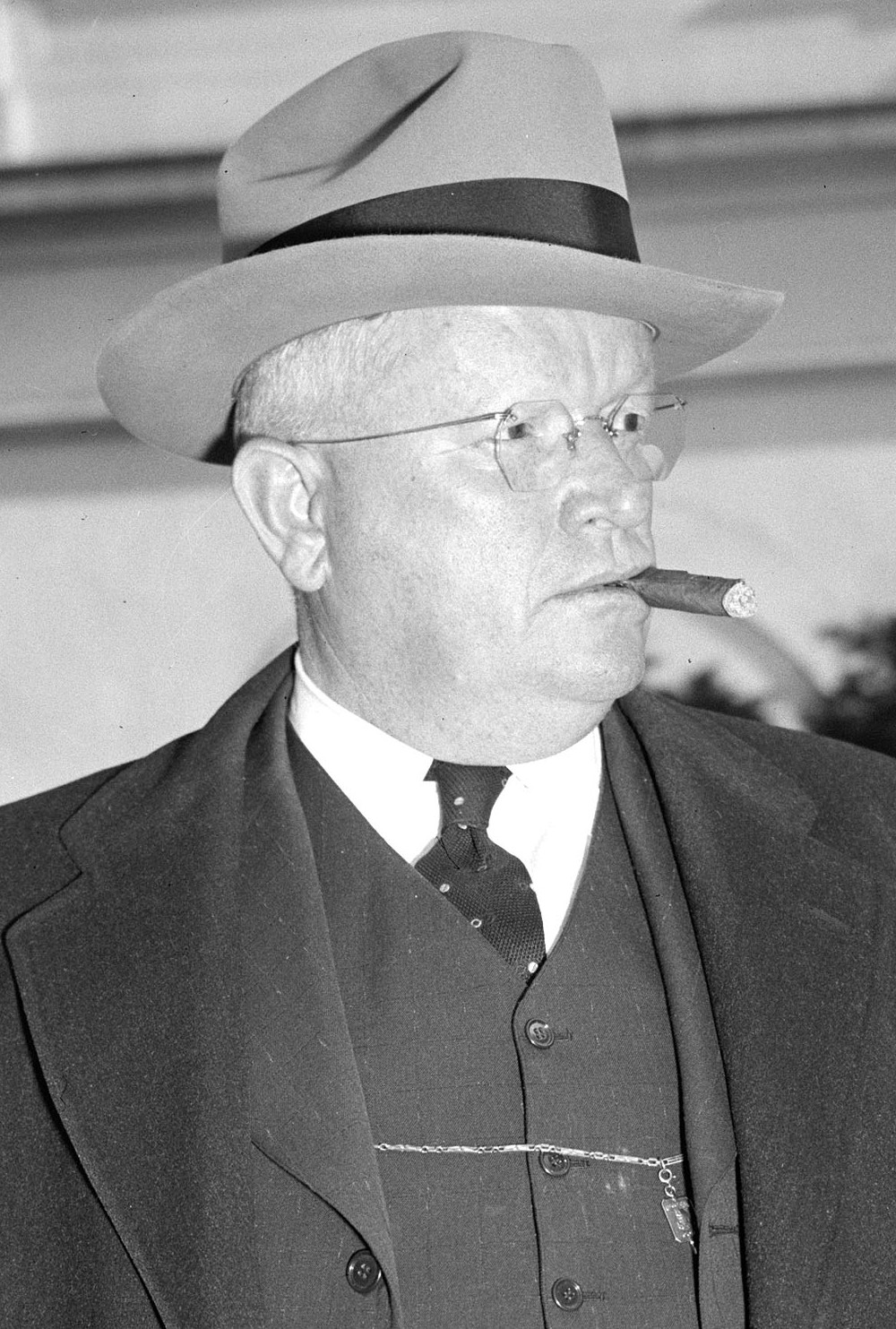

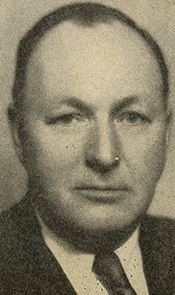
Nominee	Leon C. Phillips	Ross Rizley
Party	Democratic	Republican
Popular vote	355,740	148,861
Percentage	70.03%	29.31%
- County results Phillips: 50–60% 60–70% 70–80% 80–90% >90% Rizley: 50–60% 60–70%
Governor before election
E. W. Marland
Democratic
Elected Governor
Leon C. Phillips
Democratic

The 1938 Oklahoma gubernatorial election was held on November 8, 1938, and was a race for Governor of Oklahoma. Democrat Leon 'Red' Phillips defeated Republican former State Senator Ross Rizley. Also on the ballot were John Wesley Lanham of the Prohibition Party and Independent John Franing. This election is the last time an alternative party has had a primary for governor in Oklahoma, as the Prohibitionists chose Francis Simpson over Ralph Butterfield, but Simpson then withdrew and the party placed Lanham on the ballot as a replacement.

Phillips' 70% share of the popular vote was the highest by any gubernatorial candidate in Oklahoma to that point and has only been exceeded once in subsequent elections. (Note: By J. Howard Edmondson in 1958)

== Primary election ==
Oklahoma eliminated the primary runoffs starting with this election.

=== Democratic party ===
Nine candidates vied for the Democratic nomination, including former governors Alfalfa Bill Murray and Jack C. Walton. With the elimination of the runoff primary, Oklahoma House of Representatives Speaker Red Phillips eked out a narrow win over W. S. Key.

==== Candidates ====
- T. W. Bickel
- J. M. Cole
- John W. Davis
- William M. Edwards
- Ira M. Finley, labor activist
- W. S. Key, Oklahoma prison administrator and national guard leader
- William H. Murray, former governor (1931-1935)
- Leon C. Phillips, former Speaker of the Oklahoma House of Representatives
- Jack Walton, member of Oklahoma Corporation Commission and former governor (1923)

==== Results ====
Democratic primary results
Party	Candidate	Votes	%
Democratic	Leon C. Phillips	179,139	30.17%
Democratic	W. S. Key	176,034	29.65%
Democratic	William H. Murray	148,395	25.00%
Democratic	Jack Walton	45,760	7.71%
Democratic	Ira M. Finley	37,107	6.25%
Democratic	William M. Edwards	2,557	0.43%
Democratic	John W. Davis	2,205	0.37%
Democratic	J. M. Cole	1,410	0.24%
Democratic	T. W. Bickel	1,088	0.18%
Total votes		593,695	100.00%

=== Republican party ===
Future Congressman Ross Rizley defeated two challengers by a wide margin to claim the GOP nomination.

==== Candidates ====
- J. T. Dickerson, attorney and former member of Oklahoma House of Representatives
- Harry E. Ingram
- Ross Rizley, former member of Oklahoma Senate

==== Results ====
Republican primary results
Party	Candidate	Votes	%
Republican	Ross Rizley	24,198	46.05%
Republican	Harry E. Ingram	15,460	29.42%
Republican	J. T. Dickerson	12,890	24.53%
Total votes		52,548	100.00%

=== Prohibition party ===
Francis Simpson defeated Ralph Butterfield in the primary but then withdrew. John Wesley Lanham of Bethany was named as a replacement candidate. This was the only alternative party gubernatorial primary in Oklahoma until 2018.

==== Results ====
Prohibition primary results
Party	Candidate	Votes	%
Prohibition	Francis M. Simpson	98	57.65%
Prohibition	Ralph M. Butterfield	72	42.35%
Total votes		170	100.00%

== General election ==
=== Results ===
1938 Oklahoma gubernatorial election
Party	Candidate	Votes	%	±%
Democratic	Leon C. Phillips	355,740	70.03%	+11.79%
Republican	Ross Rizley	148,861	29.31%	−9.50%
Prohibition	John Wesley Lanham	2,579	0.51%	
Independent	John Franing	776	0.15%	+0.14%
Total votes		507,956	100.00%	
Majority		206,879	40.73%	
Democratic hold		Swing	+21.29%	

=== Results by county ===
Phillips was the first Democrat to win Garfield County, Kingfisher County, and Logan County in a gubernatorial election. Texas County would not vote for the losing candidate again until 1990.

County	Leon C. Phillips Democratic		Ross Rizley Republican		John W. Lanham Prohibition		John Franing Independent		Margin		Total votes cast
County	#	%	#	%	#	%	#	%	#	%	Total votes cast
Adair	3,573	62.48%	2,125	37.16%	21	0.37%	0	0.00%	1,448	25.32%	5,719
Alfalfa	2,556	48.37%	2,644	50.04%	79	1.50%	5	0.09%	-88	-1.67%	5,284
Atoka	3,192	85.21%	546	14.58%	3	0.08%	5	0.13%	2,646	70.64%	3,746
Beaver	1,256	37.41%	2,087	62.17%	13	0.39%	1	0.03%	-831	-24.75%	3,357
Beckham	2,958	79.52%	730	19.62%	27	0.73%	5	0.13%	2,228	59.89%	3,720
Blaine	3,060	53.91%	2,574	45.35%	36	0.63%	6	0.11%	486	8.56%	5,676
Bryan	5,255	92.36%	420	7.38%	14	0.25%	1	0.02%	4,835	84.97%	5,690
Caddo	6,492	68.59%	2,911	30.76%	42	0.44%	20	0.21%	3,581	37.83%	9,465
Canadian	4,860	63.49%	2,746	35.87%	38	0.50%	11	0.14%	2,114	27.62%	7,655
Carter	6,054	87.56%	834	12.06%	15	0.22%	11	0.16%	5,220	75.50%	6,914
Cherokee	4,137	67.91%	1,939	31.83%	14	0.23%	2	0.03%	2,198	36.08%	6,092
Choctaw	3,852	89.54%	442	10.27%	8	0.19%	0	0.00%	3,410	79.27%	4,302
Cimarron	808	49.91%	779	48.12%	9	0.56%	23	1.42%	29	1.79%	1,619
Cleveland	3,745	79.01%	948	20.00%	36	0.76%	11	0.23%	2,797	59.01%	4,740
Coal	1,690	87.16%	243	12.53%	4	0.21%	2	0.10%	1,447	74.63%	1,939
Comanche	5,850	78.87%	1,521	20.51%	31	0.42%	15	0.20%	4,329	58.37%	7,417
Cotton	2,425	80.46%	577	19.14%	11	0.36%	1	0.03%	1,848	61.31%	3,014
Craig	4,157	70.12%	1,744	29.42%	10	0.17%	17	0.29%	2,413	40.71%	5,928
Creek	10,030	67.00%	4,878	32.59%	49	0.33%	13	0.09%	5,152	34.42%	14,970
Custer	4,452	82.11%	931	17.17%	35	0.65%	4	0.07%	3,521	64.94%	5,422
Delaware	3,397	62.93%	1,971	36.51%	26	0.48%	4	0.07%	1,426	26.42%	5,398
Dewey	2,235	57.21%	1,642	42.03%	24	0.61%	6	0.15%	593	15.18%	3,907
Ellis	1,622	50.51%	1,576	49.08%	12	0.37%	1	0.03%	46	1.43%	3,211
Garfield	8,419	56.22%	6,391	42.68%	151	1.01%	13	0.09%	2,028	13.54%	14,974
Garvin	3,810	80.43%	896	18.91%	19	0.40%	12	0.25%	2,914	61.52%	4,737
Grady	5,076	77.33%	1,451	22.11%	21	0.32%	16	0.24%	3,625	55.23%	6,564
Grant	2,769	51.02%	2,607	48.04%	45	0.83%	6	0.11%	162	2.99%	5,427
Greer	1,852	85.66%	304	14.06%	6	0.28%	0	0.00%	1,548	71.60%	2,162
Harmon	1,102	88.87%	130	10.48%	5	0.40%	3	0.24%	972	78.39%	1,240
Harper	1,246	52.93%	1,093	46.43%	11	0.47%	4	0.17%	153	6.50%	2,354
Haskell	3,744	75.32%	1,216	24.46%	7	0.14%	4	0.08%	2,528	50.85%	4,971
Hughes	4,286	82.00%	927	17.73%	10	0.19%	4	0.08%	3,359	64.26%	5,227
Jackson	2,588	85.84%	411	13.63%	10	0.33%	6	0.20%	2,177	72.21%	3,015
Jefferson	2,505	87.43%	349	12.18%	6	0.21%	5	0.17%	2,156	75.25%	2,865
Johnston	2,754	87.90%	358	11.43%	10	0.32%	11	0.35%	2,396	76.48%	3,133
Kay	7,704	53.84%	6,469	45.21%	132	0.92%	4	0.03%	1,235	8.63%	14,309
Kingfisher	3,145	54.10%	2,632	45.28%	32	0.55%	4	0.07%	513	8.83%	5,813
Kiowa	2,924	76.09%	892	23.21%	23	0.60%	4	0.10%	2,032	52.88%	3,843
Latimer	3,023	79.18%	773	20.25%	18	0.47%	4	0.10%	2,250	58.93%	3,818
Le Flore	6,739	77.95%	1,865	21.57%	32	0.37%	9	0.10%	4,874	56.38%	8,645
Lincoln	5,613	56.73%	4,232	42.77%	42	0.42%	8	0.08%	1,381	13.96%	9,895
Logan	5,201	60.96%	3,213	37.66%	85	1.00%	33	0.39%	1,988	23.30%	8,532
Love	1,606	90.89%	154	8.72%	3	0.17%	4	0.23%	1,452	82.17%	1,767
Major	1,782	46.50%	2,010	52.45%	37	0.97%	3	0.08%	-228	-5.95%	3,832
Marshall	1,488	88.26%	193	11.45%	5	0.30%	0	0.00%	1,295	76.81%	1,686
Mayes	3,874	66.89%	1,897	32.75%	14	0.24%	7	0.12%	1,977	34.13%	5,792
McClain	2,063	82.59%	433	17.33%	1	0.04%	1	0.04%	1,630	65.25%	2,498
McCurtain	3,566	90.71%	358	9.11%	4	0.10%	3	0.08%	3,208	81.61%	3,931
McIntosh	3,739	76.76%	1,106	22.71%	13	0.27%	13	0.27%	2,633	54.05%	4,871
Murray	2,378	86.88%	339	12.39%	16	0.58%	4	0.15%	2,039	74.50%	2,737
Muskogee	9,762	78.92%	2,573	20.80%	30	0.24%	5	0.04%	7,189	58.12%	12,370
Noble	2,800	54.06%	2,339	45.16%	28	0.54%	12	0.23%	461	8.90%	5,179
Nowata	3,195	60.03%	2,100	39.46%	20	0.38%	7	0.13%	1,095	20.57%	5,322
Okfuskee	4,298	83.05%	867	16.75%	7	0.14%	3	0.06%	3,431	66.30%	5,175
Oklahoma	31,585	73.86%	10,828	25.32%	309	0.72%	43	0.10%	20,757	48.54%	42,765
Okmulgee	8,032	71.39%	3,166	28.14%	34	0.30%	19	0.17%	4,866	43.25%	11,251
Osage	5,647	68.96%	2,468	30.14%	67	0.82%	7	0.09%	3,179	38.82%	8,189
Ottawa	6,544	66.58%	3,237	32.93%	32	0.33%	16	0.16%	3,307	33.65%	9,829
Pawnee	3,252	53.48%	2,798	46.01%	22	0.36%	9	0.15%	454	7.47%	6,081
Payne	6,051	67.35%	2,876	32.01%	45	0.50%	13	0.14%	3,175	35.34%	8,985
Pittsburg	7,378	86.56%	1,124	13.19%	17	0.20%	5	0.06%	6,254	73.37%	8,524
Pontotoc	4,128	83.14%	815	16.41%	19	0.38%	3	0.03%	3,313	66.73%	4,965
Pottawatomie	11,178	79.95%	2,574	18.41%	48	0.34%	182	1.30%	8,604	61.54%	13,982
Pushmataha	3,628	82.66%	709	16.15%	46	1.05%	6	0.14%	2,919	66.51%	4,389
Roger Mills	2,380	81.70%	513	17.61%	13	0.45%	7	0.24%	1,867	64.09%	2,913
Rogers	4,019	69.58%	1,621	28.06%	130	2.25%	6	0.10%	2,398	41.52%	5,776
Seminole	7,148	78.57%	1,886	20.73%	50	0.55%	14	0.15%	5,262	57.84%	9,098
Sequoyah	4,240	72.81%	1,568	26.93%	14	0.24%	1	0.02%	2,672	45.89%	5,823
Stephens	4,129	83.26%	799	16.11%	16	0.32%	15	0.30%	3,330	67.15%	4,959
Texas	1,313	34.47%	2,485	65.24%	10	0.26%	1	0.03%	-1,172	-30.77%	3,809
Tillman	2,701	84.56%	475	14.87%	17	0.53%	1	0.03%	2,226	69.69%	3,194
Tulsa	22,903	66.81%	11,253	32.83%	99	0.29%	24	0.07%	11,650	33.99%	34,279
Wagoner	2,929	67.64%	1,384	31.96%	13	0.30%	4	0.09%	1,545	35.68%	4,330
Washington	5,370	60.77%	3,413	38.62%	48	0.54%	6	0.07%	1,957	22.15%	8,837
Washita	2,680	75.22%	867	24.33%	10	0.28%	6	0.17%	1,813	50.88%	3,563
Woods	3,332	57.64%	2,384	41.24%	59	1.02%	6	0.10%	948	16.40%	5,781
Woodward	2,466	51.75%	2,232	46.84%	61	1.28%	6	0.13%	234	4.91%	4,765
Totals	355,740	70.03%	148,861	29.31%	2,579	0.51%	776	0.15%	206,879	40.73%	507,956

==== Counties that flipped from Republican to Democratic ====
- Adair
- Cherokee
- Delaware
- Dewey
- Ellis
- Garfield
- Harper
- Kingfisher
- Lincoln
- Logan
- Mayes
- Nowata
- Pawnee
- Rogers
- Woodward

==== Counties that flipped from Democratic to Republican ====
- Texas
