= Page Belcher =

American politician (1899–1980)

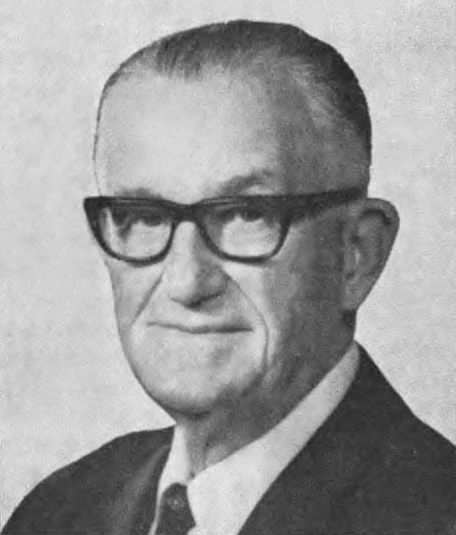

Member of the U.S. House of Representatives from Oklahoma
- In office January 3, 1951 – January 3, 1973
- Preceded by: George H. Wilson
- Succeeded by: James R. Jones
- Constituency: 8th district (1951–1953); 1st district (1953–1973)

Personal details
- Born: April 21, 1899 Jefferson, Oklahoma Territory
- Died: August 2, 1980 (aged 81) Midwest City, Oklahoma, U.S.
- Party: Republican
- Spouse: Gladys Collins (m. 1922)
- Children: 2
- Education: University of Oklahoma
- Profession: Lawyer

Military service
- Allegiance: United States
- Branch/service: United States Army
- Battles/wars: World War I

Page Henry Belcher (April 21, 1899 – August 2, 1980) was an American Republican politician and a U.S. Representative from Oklahoma.

== Biography ==
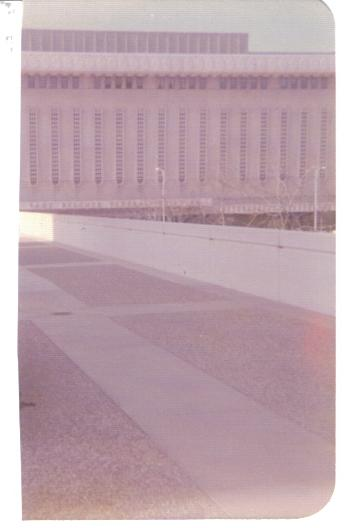
The Page Belcher Federal Courthouse (1974 photograph) is located in Tulsa, Oklahoma.

Belcher was born in Jefferson in northern Oklahoma to George Harvey Belcher and Jessie Ray. He was educated at public schools in Jefferson, and Medford, Oklahoma. Belcher attended Friends University, a private non-denominational Christian university in Wichita, Kansas. He served as a private in the Student Army Training Corps at the University of Oklahoma during World War I. While in college he studied law and played for the 1918 Oklahoma Sooners football team.

== Career ==
After the war, Belcher worked as manager of his father's Oklahoma car dealership. He was admitted to the bar in 1936 and began a legal practice in Enid. In 1934, he was elected county clerk of Garfield County and served from 1934 to 1938. He also served on the Enid Board of Education and as judge of Enid's municipal court. Belcher served as executive assistant to U.S. Representative Ross Rizley during Rizley's first term in Congress (1941–1943) and later managed several of Rizley's reelection campaigns. He served as Republican chairman of the 8th congressional district, and was also the executive secretary of the Oklahoma Republican Party.

In 1950, Belcher was elected to Congress, where he served for two years as the last representative of Oklahoma's 8th congressional district before it was eliminated in congressional reapportionment. After most of the 8th's territory was merged with the Tulsa-based 1st district, Belcher ran for reelection there, and held the seat until retiring in 1973. After his home in Enid was drawn out of the district during a mid-decade redistricting in 1967, Belcher moved to Tulsa.

In Congress, Belcher was a member of the Agriculture Committee and its wheat subcommittee, eventually rising to ranking Republican on that committee. In that role, he facilitated passage of legislation related to the Arkansas River Navigation System.

Breaking with many of his regional colleagues, Belcher refused to sign the 1956 Southern Manifesto, and he voted in favor of the Civil Rights Acts of 1957 and 1960, as well as the 24th Amendment to the U.S. Constitution and the Voting Rights Act of 1965, but voted against the Civil Rights Acts of 1964 and 1968. In 1971, Belcher was the sole Republican in the state's congressional delegation to vote for the Equal Employment Opportunity Act.

Belcher usually had easy reelection campaigns because the Tulsa area was friendly to Republicans, but was nearly defeated in 1958 due to discontent over the Eisenhower administration's farm policy. He faced another credible challenge in 1970, when former Johnson administration official James R. Jones held him to only 55 percent of the vote. With Jones priming for a rematch in 1972, Belcher announced that June that he was retiring due to age and poor health. Jones then won the seat in the subsequent election.

== Personal life ==
Page Belcher was married on June 16, 1922, to Gladys Collins. The two had a son, Page Jr., and a daughter, Carol. Belcher was a Methodist, a Member of the Kiwanis, American Legion, and Odd Fellows. He was inducted into the Oklahoma Hall of Fame. Following his retirement, he moved to Midwest City where he died on August 2, 1980, at the age of 81. He is buried at Memorial Park Cemetery, Enid, Oklahoma. After his retirement from Congress, the federal courthouse in Tulsa was named in his honor. In addition, Tulsa is home to the Page Belcher golf course.

U.S. House of Representatives
Preceded by George H. Wilson	Member of the U.S. House of Representatives from Oklahoma's 8th congressional district January 3, 1951 – January 3, 1953	Succeeded by none
Preceded by George B. Schwabe	Member of the U.S. House of Representatives from Oklahoma's 1st congressional district January 3, 1953 – January 3, 1973	Succeeded by James R. Jones
