= 1958 Oklahoma gubernatorial election =

- November 4, 1958
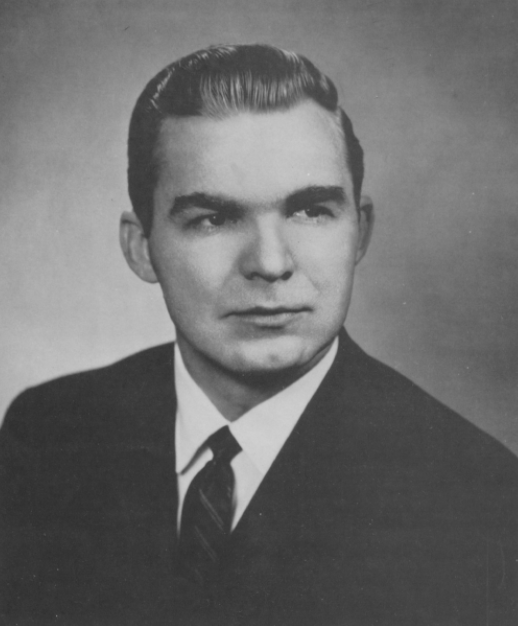

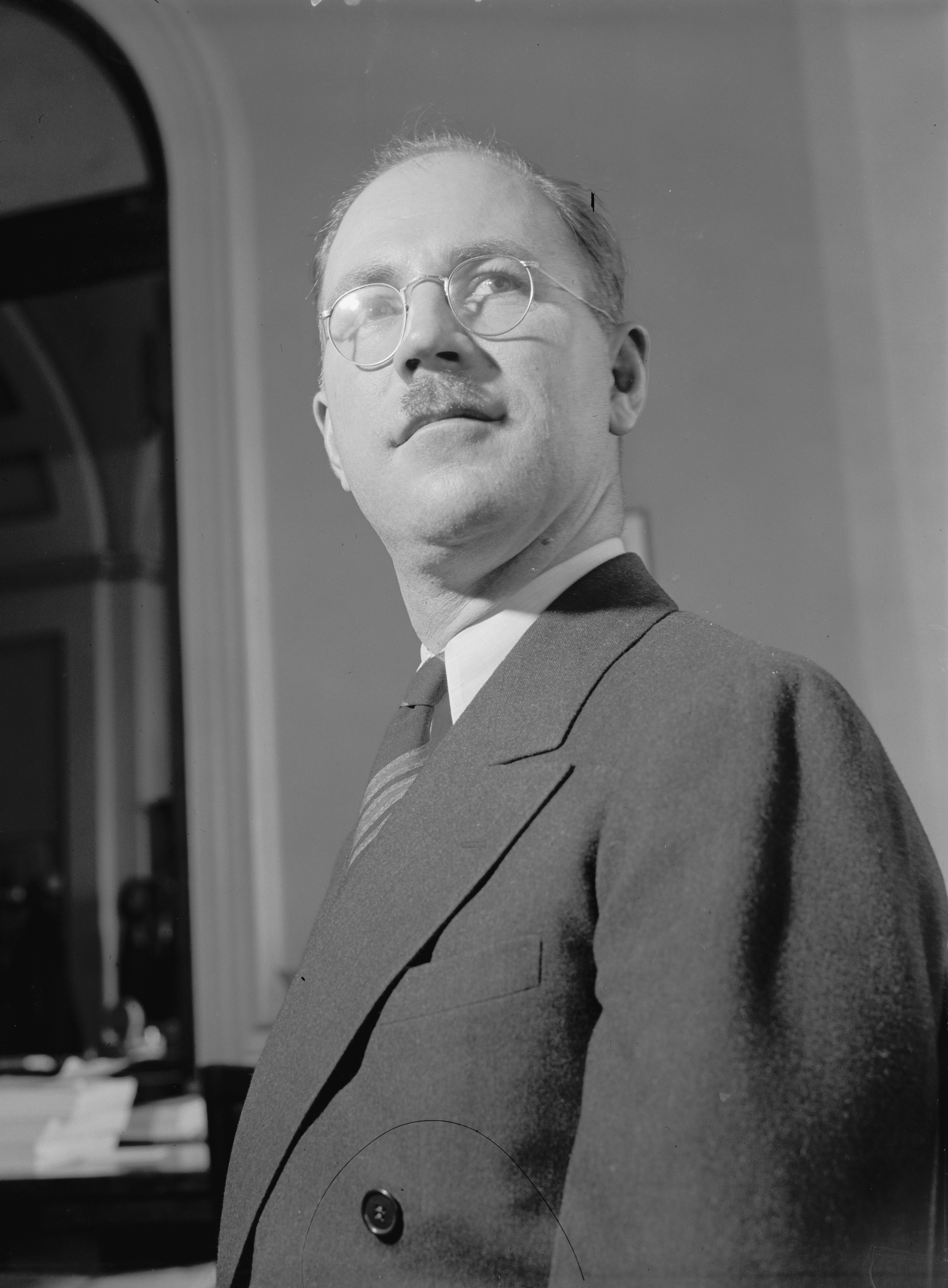

Nominee	J. Howard Edmondson	Phil Ferguson	D. A. "Jelly" Bryce
Party	Democratic	Republican	Independent
Popular vote	399,504	107,495	31,840
Percentage	74.14%	19.95%	5.91%
- County results Edmondson: 40–50% 50–60% 60–70% 70–80% 80–90% >90%
Governor before election
Raymond D. Gary
Democratic
Elected Governor
J. Howard Edmondson
Democratic

The 1958 Oklahoma gubernatorial election was held on November 4, 1958, and was a race for Governor of Oklahoma. Democrat J. Howard Edmondson defeated Republican Phil Ferguson and Independent D. A. 'Jelly' Bryce.

Edmondson's landslide saw him win every county and achieve the highest share of the popular vote in any gubernatorial election in Oklahoma's history. This is one of two gubernatorial elections in Oklahoma in which the winner has carried every county. (Note: George Nigh also won every county in 1982)

== Primary election ==
=== Democratic party ===
J. Howard Edmondson defeated W. P. "Bill" Atkinson in a runoff after both advanced from a crowded primary field. William O. Coe sought the Democratic nomination for the fourth consecutive election.

==== Candidates ====
- W. P. "Bill" Atkinson, newspaper publisher
- Joe H. Barber
- William O. Coe, former member of Oklahoma House of Representatives
- Bill Doenges, automobile dealership owner from Bartlesville
- J. Howard Edmondson, district attorney of Tulsa County
- B. E. "Bill" Harkey, Speaker of the Oklahoma House of Representatives
- A. B. McDonald
- George Miskovsky, member of Oklahoma Senate
- Jim A. Rinehart, member of Oklahoma Senate
- B. V. Samples
- Andrew C. Wilcoxen

==== Results ====
Democratic primary results
Party	Candidate	Votes	%
Democratic	J. Howard Edmondson	108,358	21.10%
Democratic	W. P. "Bill" Atkinson	107,616	20.95%
Democratic	George Miskovsky	87,766	17.09%
Democratic	William O. Coe	72,763	14.17%
Democratic	Bill Doenges	57,990	11.29%
Democratic	Jim A. Rinehart	39,279	7.65%
Democratic	B. E. "Bill" Harkey	23,362	4.55%
Democratic	Andrew C. Wilcoxen	12,958	2.52%
Democratic	A. B. McDonald	1,411	0.27%
Democratic	Joe H. Barber	1,294	0.25%
Democratic	B. V. Samples	797	0.16%
Total votes		538,839	100.00%

Democratic primary runoff results
Party	Candidate	Votes	%
Democratic	J. Howard Edmondson	363,742	69.61%
Democratic	W. P. "Bill" Atkinson	158,780	30.39%
Total votes		522,522	100.00%

=== Republican party ===
==== Candidates ====
- Clarence E. Barnes
- Rexford B. Cragg
- Phil Ferguson, former representative from Oklahoma's 8th congressional district
- Carmon C. Harris

==== Results ====
Republican primary results
Party	Candidate	Votes	%
Republican	Phil Ferguson	31,602	51.37%
Republican	Clarence E. Barnes	21,075	34.26%
Republican	Carmon C. Harris	5,941	9.66%
Republican	Rexford B. Cragg	2,900	4.71%
Total votes		61,518	100.00%

== Results ==
1958 Oklahoma gubernatorial election
Party	Candidate	Votes	%	±%
Democratic	J. Howard Edmondson	399,504	74.14%	+15.48%
Republican	Phil Ferguson	107,495	19.95%	−21.39%
Independent	D. A. "Jelly" Bryce	31,840	5.91%	
Total votes		538,839	100.00%	
Majority		292,009	54.19%	
Democratic hold		Swing	+36.86%	

=== Results by county ===
Edmondson was the first Democrat to carry Alfalfa County in a gubernatorial election.

County	J. Howard Edmondson Democratic		Phil Ferguson Republican		D. A. Bryce Independent		Margin		Total votes cast
County	#	%	#	%	#	%	#	%	Total votes cast
Adair	3,136	64.93%	1,651	34.18%	43	0.89%	1,485	30.75%	4,830
Alfalfa	1,881	53.05%	1,268	35.76%	397	11.20%	613	17.29%	3,546
Atoka	2,068	85.28%	271	11.18%	86	3.55%	1,797	74.10%	2,425
Beaver	788	53.24%	585	39.53%	107	7.23%	203	13.72%	1,480
Beckham	2,659	78.93%	537	15.94%	173	5.14%	2,122	62.99%	3,369
Blaine	2,459	57.97%	1,411	33.26%	372	8.77%	1,048	24.71%	4,242
Bryan	4,253	91.40%	352	7.57%	48	1.03%	3,901	83.84%	4,653
Caddo	5,138	71.99%	1,327	18.59%	672	9.42%	3,811	53.40%	7,137
Canadian	5,055	70.09%	1,545	21.42%	612	8.49%	3,510	48.67%	7,212
Carter	7,364	88.81%	713	8.60%	215	2.59%	6,651	80.21%	8,292
Cherokee	3,397	80.25%	792	18.71%	44	1.04%	2,605	61.54%	4,233
Choctaw	2,544	91.45%	197	7.08%	41	1.47%	2,347	84.36%	2,782
Cimarron	758	67.32%	294	26.11%	74	6.57%	464	41.21%	1,126
Cleveland	5,734	75.09%	1,258	16.47%	644	8.43%	4,476	58.62%	7,636
Coal	1,265	88.65%	123	8.62%	39	2.73%	1,142	80.03%	1,427
Comanche	11,053	87.57%	997	7.90%	572	4.53%	10,056	79.67%	12,622
Cotton	1,625	85.44%	230	12.09%	47	2.47%	1,395	73.34%	1,902
Craig	3,264	72.23%	1,120	24.78%	135	2.99%	2,144	47.44%	4,519
Creek	6,966	75.32%	1,898	20.52%	385	4.16%	5,068	54.80%	9,249
Custer	3,025	71.72%	911	21.60%	282	6.69%	2,114	50.12%	4,218
Delaware	3,157	69.60%	1,285	28.33%	94	2.07%	1,872	41.27%	4,536
Dewey	1,557	63.86%	746	30.60%	135	5.54%	811	33.26%	2,438
Ellis	1,318	56.88%	824	35.56%	175	7.55%	494	21.32%	2,317
Garfield	10,181	64.06%	4,389	27.62%	1,322	8.32%	5,792	36.45%	15,892
Garvin	4,020	84.22%	521	10.92%	232	4.86%	3,499	73.31%	4,773
Grady	4,917	80.67%	773	12.68%	405	6.64%	4,144	67.99%	6,095
Grant	2,385	64.25%	1,065	28.69%	262	7.06%	1,320	35.56%	3,712
Greer	1,367	77.23%	292	16.50%	111	6.27%	1,075	60.73%	1,770
Harmon	972	90.17%	84	7.79%	22	2.04%	888	82.37%	1,078
Harper	742	51.56%	579	40.24%	118	8.20%	163	11.33%	1,439
Haskell	1,581	85.51%	244	13.20%	24	1.30%	1,337	72.31%	1,849
Hughes	2,865	86.06%	362	10.87%	102	3.06%	2,503	75.19%	3,329
Jackson	3,820	85.80%	403	9.05%	229	5.14%	3,417	76.75%	4,452
Jefferson	1,471	89.37%	152	9.23%	23	1.40%	1,319	80.13%	1,646
Johnston	1,812	89.97%	155	7.70%	47	2.33%	1,657	82.27%	2,014
Kay	12,126	70.52%	4,201	24.43%	867	5.04%	7,925	46.09%	17,194
Kingfisher	2,064	50.91%	1,636	40.36%	354	8.73%	428	10.56%	4,054
Kiowa	2,092	49.67%	971	23.05%	1,149	27.28%	943 (Note: Edmondson's margin over Bryce)	22.39%	4,212
Latimer	1,678	86.05%	235	12.05%	37	1.90%	1,443	74.00%	1,950
Le Flore	4,859	84.86%	772	13.48%	95	1.66%	4,087	71.38%	5,726
Lincoln	5,179	69.15%	1,927	25.73%	384	5.13%	3,252	43.42%	7,490
Logan	4,199	64.08%	1,614	24.63%	740	11.29%	2,585	39.45%	6,553
Love	1,311	94.05%	66	4.73%	17	1.22%	1,245	89.31%	1,394
Major	1,294	50.02%	974	37.65%	319	12.33%	320	12.37%	2,587
Marshall	1,952	93.13%	106	5.06%	38	1.81%	1,846	88.07%	2,096
Mayes	4,603	73.14%	1,524	24.22%	166	2.64%	3,079	48.93%	6,293
McClain	2,435	87.56%	235	8.45%	111	3.99%	2,200	79.11%	2,781
McCurtain	3,913	92.75%	263	6.23%	43	1.02%	3,650	86.51%	4,219
McIntosh	2,587	86.29%	366	12.21%	45	1.50%	2,221	74.08%	2,998
Murray	2,106	87.13%	213	8.81%	98	4.05%	1,893	78.32%	2,417
Muskogee	11,596	84.75%	1,840	13.45%	246	1.80%	9,756	71.31%	13,682
Noble	2,727	64.18%	1,276	30.03%	246	5.79%	1,451	34.15%	4,249
Nowata	3,021	69.35%	1,075	24.68%	260	5.97%	1,946	44.67%	4,356
Okfuskee	2,336	82.40%	357	12.59%	142	5.01%	1,979	69.81%	2,835
Oklahoma	52,472	68.18%	16,012	20.81%	8,477	11.01%	36,460	47.37%	76,961
Okmulgee	6,465	82.17%	1,157	14.71%	246	3.13%	5,308	67.46%	7,868
Osage	6,237	75.66%	1,519	18.43%	488	5.92%	4,718	57.23%	8,244
Ottawa	5,239	73.76%	1,688	23.76%	176	2.48%	3,551	49.99%	7,103
Pawnee	2,576	65.07%	1,147	28.97%	236	5.96%	1,429	36.09%	3,959
Payne	6,309	68.99%	2,180	23.84%	656	7.17%	4,129	45.15%	9,145
Pittsburg	7,970	90.74%	673	7.66%	140	1.59%	7,297	83.08%	8,783
Pontotoc	4,707	84.70%	626	11.27%	224	4.03%	4,081	73.44%	5,557
Pottawatomie	8,007	80.35%	1,408	14.13%	550	5.52%	6,599	66.22%	9,965
Pushmataha	2,358	90.97%	214	8.26%	20	0.77%	2,144	82.72%	2,592
Roger Mills	920	75.41%	233	19.10%	67	5.49%	687	56.31%	1,220
Rogers	3,553	77.16%	845	18.35%	207	4.50%	2,708	58.81%	4,605
Seminole	4,489	79.59%	865	15.34%	286	5.07%	3,624	64.26%	5,640
Sequoyah	3,241	85.18%	530	13.93%	34	0.89%	2,711	71.25%	3,805
Stephens	5,601	81.15%	935	13.55%	366	5.30%	4,666	67.60%	6,902
Texas	2,296	68.41%	839	25.00%	221	6.59%	1,457	43.41%	3,356
Tillman	2.473	84.26%	351	11.96%	111	3.78%	2,122	72.30%	2,935
Tulsa	66,564	74.21%	19,185	21.39%	3,953	4.41%	47,379	52.82%	89,702
Wagoner	3,591	72.90%	1,213	24.62%	122	2.48%	2,378	48.27%	4,926
Washington	9,345	70.54%	3,321	25.07%	582	4.39%	6,024	45.47%	13,248
Washita	1,890	70.18%	479	17.79%	324	12.03%	1,411	52.40%	2,693
Woods	2,513	59.66%	1,304	30.96%	395	9.38%	1,209	28.70%	4,212
Woodward	2,013	49.19%	1,766	43.16%	313	7.65%	247	6.04%	4,092
Totals	399,504	74.14%	107,495	19.95%	31,840	5.91%	292,009	54.19%	538,839

==== Counties that flipped from Republican to Democratic ====
- Alfalfa
- Beaver
- Blaine
- Canadian
- Dewey
- Ellis
- Garfield
- Grant
- Harper
- Kay
- Kingfisher
- Logan
- Major
- Noble
- Tulsa
- Washington
- Woods
- Woodward
