= Manuel Herrick =

American politician (1876–1952)

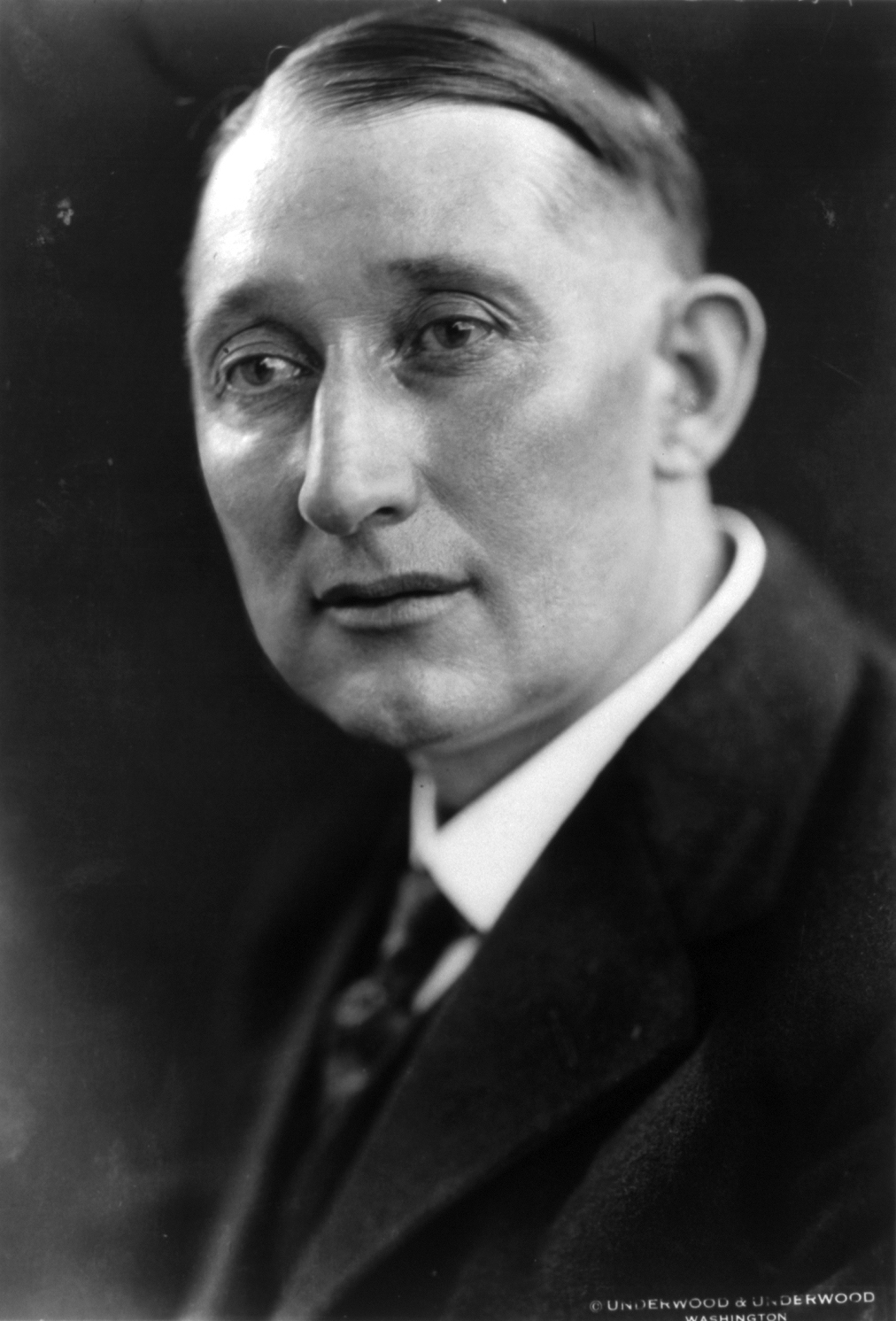
- Herrick in 1930

Member of the U.S. House of Representatives from Oklahoma's 8th district
- In office March 4, 1921 – March 3, 1923
- Preceded by: Charles Swindall
- Succeeded by: Milton C. Garber

Personal details
- Born: Immanuel Herrick; September 20, 1876 Perry Township, Tuscarawas County, Ohio, U.S.
- Died: c. January 11, 1952 (disappeared and likely died that same day) Quincy, California, U.S.
- Party: Republican

Manuel Herrick, nicknamed the "Okie Jesus Congressman" (September 20, 1876 – c. January 11, 1952) was a United States representative from Oklahoma for one term, from March 4, 1921 to March 3, 1923.

== Early life ==
Born Immanuel Herrick in Perry Township, Tuscarawas County, Ohio on September 20, 1876, he moved with his parents, John Emanuel Herrick and Belinda Kale Herrick, to Greenwood County, Kansas in 1877. Herrick’s mother believed her son was Jesus Christ reincarnated, leading Herrick himself to believe so as well. Herrick was self-educated and engaged in agricultural pursuits. In 1893, he settled in the Cherokee Strip in Oklahoma Territory.

On June 29, 1893, Herrick attempted to rob a train, but was arrested by the conductor. He was deemed insane and sent to Oak Lawn Retreat, a private asylum in Jacksonville, Illinois, founded by Andrew McFarland. Afterwards, Herrick moved to Perry and became interested in agriculture and stock raising.

In 1907 prior to statehood, he was a justice of the peace in Noble County. After statehood, he unsuccessfully ran for several county offices in Noble County.His mother died on December 9, 1911. In 1914, his father sold him the family farm near Perry, before dying on December 12, 1918. In 1918, he made his first run for the U.S. House of Representatives, receiving 56 votes.

== Congressional career ==
At the age of forty-two, Herrick was elected as a Republican to the Sixty-seventh Congress. Herrick won the Republican nomination after the popular incumbent Republican congressman, Dick T. Morgan, died unexpectedly on the last day of filing, allowing Herrick to take the nomination unopposed. Herrick was elected in November 1920 based on the strength of Warren G. Harding's showing in his district. Herrick served from March 4, 1921 to March 3, 1923. He unsuccessfully ran for reelection in 1922, losing in the Republican primary.

Herrick was also notable for his prowess as a barnstorming aviator, and for his Jesus reincarnation claims, leading him to be nicknamed the “Okie Jesus Congressman”. He intended to campaign for reelection using a plane in 1922, but it crashed in Hamlin, Arkansas, with Herrick sustaining minor injuries. He lost his 1924 reelection campaign to fellow Republican Milton C. Garber.

=== Beauty pageants, a failed marriage proposal, and losing the farm ===
As a Congressman, Herrick was one of the more colorful members of that body. During his one-and-only term, Herrick introduced legislation to ban beauty pageants. In order to illustrate the immorality of the pageants, he sent letters to several former beauty pageant contestants in Washington D.C., inviting them to participate in a pageant. Several of the tricked former pageant contestants threatened to sue Herrick and claimed he used the contest as a pretext to solicit marriage proposals.

While in office he had an affair with his secretary, Ethelyn Chrane. In May 1923, he was arrested for disorderly conduct for yelling at Chrane on a public street and the next month he filed a breach of promise suit for $50,000 arguing she had broken off a marriage proposal. Herrick won the suit, and was awarded one cent by the court. After the suit, Chrane brought suit for $100,000 "for statements made in the case." Chrane won her lawsuit and was awarded $6,000, however Herrick only had 160-acres of farmland in Oklahoma worth $3,200 with $6,327 in mortgages on the property. The farm was sold at a foreclosure auction in 1934. The property sold for $1,500 at auction.

== Later life and death ==
In 1925, Herrick was arrested for moonshining and claimed to be an undercover agent for the Internal Revenue Service.

In 1930, he was convicted for the unlawful manufacturing and possession of alcohol.

After leaving Congress, Herrick moved to California in 1933. He would settle in Plumas County, California in 1937 He worked as a gold miner and frequently recounted his time in Congress. He pretended to be blind to receive an $85 a month pension.

He ran for Congress again in 1948, on both the Democratic and Republican ticket against incumbent Clair Engle. He campaigned on a conspiracy theory American traitors were involved in the bombing of Pearl Harbor, denouncement of the Taft-Hartley Act, and criticism of President Harry Truman. He received 85 votes.

In 1949, there was an attempt to commit Herrick to a mental institution. He was declared not insane by the Superior Court in Plumas County.

Herrick mysteriously disappeared during a Sierra blizzard on January 11, 1952, while on a trip to his mining claim eight miles northeast of Quincy, California. A month later, Herrick was found dead in a snowbank two miles from his cabin on February 29, 1952. His remains were cremated and the ashes interred in Quincy Cemetery in Quincy. He is buried in an unmarked grave in the pauper's section.

== Electoral history ==
1918 Oklahoma's 8th congressional district general election
| Party | Candidate | Votes | % |
|---|---|---|---|
| Republican | Dick T. Morgan | 15,341 | 56.3% |
| Democratic | C. H. Hyde | 10,633 | 39.0% |
| Socialist | H. L. Branham | 1,179 | 4.3% |
| Independent | Manuel Herrick | 56 | 0.2% |
| Total votes | | 27,209 | 100.0% |
| Republican hold | | | |

1920 Oklahoma's 8th congressional district special election Republican primary
| Party | Candidate | Votes | % |
|---|---|---|---|
| Republican | Charles Swindall | 4,939 | 35.9% |
| Republican | Winfield Scott | 2,971 | 21.6% |
| Republican | William H. McKinley | 2,350 | 17.0% |
| Republican | Russell M. Chase | 1,184 | 8.6% |
| Republican | Manuel Herrick | 1,062 | 7.7% |
| Republican | John Gleason | 930 | 6.7% |
| Republican | Frank B. Boorn | 305 | 2.2% |
| Total votes | | 13,743 | 100.0 |

1920 Oklahoma's 8th congressional district Republican primary election
| Party | Candidate | Votes | % |
|---|---|---|---|
| Republican | Manuel Herrick | 7,216 | 100 |

1920 Oklahoma's 8th congressional district general election
| Party | Candidate | Votes | % |
|---|---|---|---|
| Republican | Manuel Herrick | 31,337 | 54.2 |
| Democratic | Zach A. Harris | 23,218 | 40.2% |
| Socialist | H. C. Geist | 3,243 | 5.6% |
| Total votes | | 57,798 | 100.0% |
| Republican hold | | | |

1922 Oklahoma's 8th congressional district Republican primary
| Party | Candidate | Votes | % |
|---|---|---|---|
| Republican | Milton C. Garber | 6,978 | 38.6% |
| Republican | Charles Swindall | 5,360 | 29.6% |
| Republican | Manuel Herrick | 3,446 | 19.0% |
| Republican | J. E. Smith | 1,617 | 8.9% |
| Republican | W. E. Knopp | 699 | 3.9% |
| Total votes | | 18,100 | 100.0 |

1924 Oklahoma's 8th congressional district Republican primary
| Party | Candidate | Votes | % |
|---|---|---|---|
| Republican | Milton C. Garber | 13,505 | 68.4% |
| Republican | Manuel Herrick | 3,205 | 16.2% |
| Republican | Garth W. Calderhead | 3,044 | 15.4% |
| Total votes | | 19,754 | 100.0 |

1926 Oklahoma's 8th congressional district Republican primary
| Party | Candidate | Votes | % |
|---|---|---|---|
| Republican | Milton C. Garber | 8,447 | 70.9% |
| Republican | Manuel Herrick | 1,506 | 12.6% |
| Republican | H. C. Kirkendall | 1,273 | 10.7% |
| Republican | Frank B. Boorn | 689 | 5.8% |
| Total votes | | 11,915 | 100.0 |

1928 Oklahoma's 8th congressional district Republican primary
| Party | Candidate | Votes | % |
|---|---|---|---|
| Republican | Milton C. Garber | 15,817 | 81.4% |
| Republican | Ray J. Elam | 1,811 | 9.3% |
| Republican | Manuel Herrick | 1,795 | 9.2% |
| Total votes | | 19,423 | 100.0 |

1930 Oklahoma's 8th congressional district Republican primary
| Party | Candidate | Votes | % |
|---|---|---|---|
| Republican | Milton C. Garber | 14,294 | 62.2% |
| Republican | Carl B. Haun | 8,050 | 35.0% |
| Republican | Manuel Herrick | 647 | 2.8% |
| Total votes | | 22,991 | 100.0 |

== Works cited ==
- Aldrich, Gene (1974). Okie Jesus Congressman: The Life of Manuel Herrick. Oklahoma City: Times-Journal Publishing Co.

U.S. House of Representatives
| Preceded by Charles Swindall | Member of the U.S. House of Representatives from Oklahoma's 8th congressional district 1921 – 1923 | Succeeded by Milton C. Garber |
