= Phil Ferguson =

American politician (1903–1978)

Phillip Colgan Ferguson
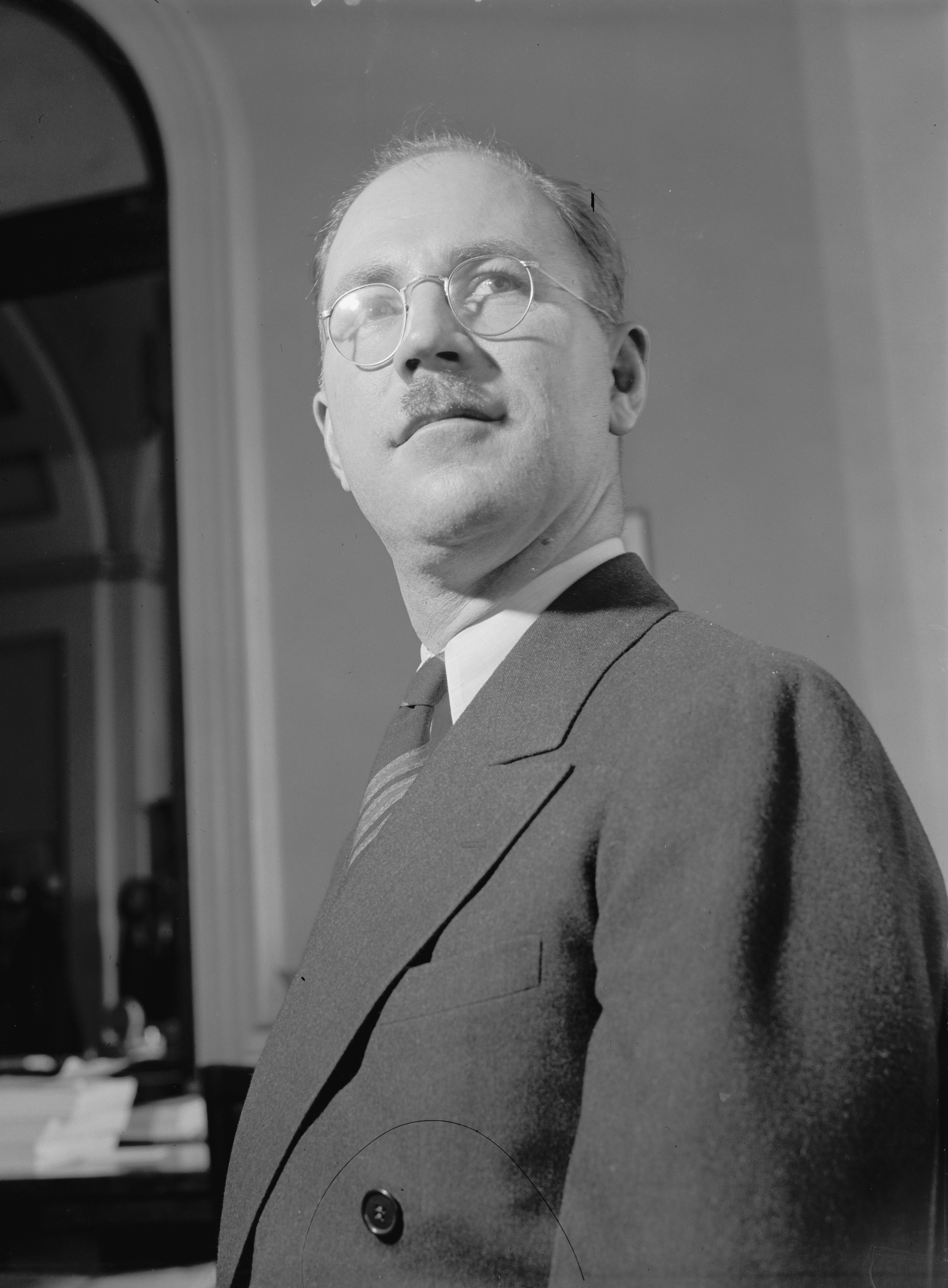
- Ferguson in 1940

Member of the U.S. House of Representatives from Oklahoma's 8th district
- In office January 3, 1935 – January 3, 1941
- Preceded by: E.W. Marland
- Succeeded by: Ross Rizley

Personal details
- Born: August 15, 1903 Wellington, Kansas, U.S.
- Died: August 8, 1978 (aged 74) Tijuana, Mexico
- Party: Democratic; Republican
- Spouse: Martha Sharon Naoma L. Restine
- Education: University of Kansas
- Profession: Banker

Military service
- Allegiance: United States
- Branch/service: Marine Corps
- Years of service: 1942–1944
- Rank: Major
- Unit: Company A, First Battalion, Ninth Marines; Marine Raiders regiment
- Battles/wars: World War II
- Awards: Silver Star

Phillip Colgan Ferguson (August 15, 1903 – August 8, 1978) was an American politician serving as a U.S. representative from Oklahoma. Phil Ferguson was born on August 15, 1903, in Wellington, Kansas, to W. M. and May Deems Ferguson. Ferguson attended public schools in Wellington, the Kemper Military School in Missouri, and graduated from the University of Kansas at Lawrence, A.B., in 1926. He moved to Oklahoma and settled on a ranch near Woodward, Woodward County, working on agricultural pursuits and cattle raising. Ferguson's interest in cattle ranching later earned him a position as a president of the Northwest Cattlemen's Association and vice president of the Oklahoma Cattlemen's Association. He was also director of the Bank of Woodward, which was owned by his father.

== Political career ==
Ferguson was elected as a Democrat to the Seventy-fourth and to the two succeeding Congresses (January 3, 1935 – January 3, 1941). As a member of the Committee on Flood Control, he helped to initiate federal involvement in soil conservation and water resources development, establishing programs that constructed reservoirs and planted native grasses in northwestern Oklahoma. In addition, he was on the Census, Elections, Public Buildings and Grounds, Irrigation and Reclamation, Rivers and Harbors, and Agriculture Committees. Following two unsuccessful reelection campaigns in 1940 (Seventy-seventh Congress) and 1944 (Seventy-ninth Congress), he resumed his former pursuits. He was also an unsuccessful Democratic gubernatorial candidate in 1950 and Republican Oklahoma gubernatorial candidate in 1958. Ferguson served on the Federal Reserve Board in Oklahoma City and as director of the Farm Credit Administration in Wichita, Kansas.

== Military service ==
During World War II, Ferguson was a commissioned major in United States Marine Corps from March 2, 1942, to August 1, 1944, receiving the Silver Star Medal. He saw action in the Pacific Theater in Company A, First Battalion, Ninth Marines and in the Marine Raiders Regiment.

== Personal life and death ==
He resided in Woodward, Oklahoma, until his death in Tijuana, Mexico, August 8, 1978. Phil Ferguson was cremated, and his ashes were scattered on the Pacific Ocean at San Diego, California.

== Sources ==
- United States Congress. "Phil Ferguson (id: F000082)". Biographical Directory of the United States Congress.

Party political offices
Preceded by Reuben K. Sparks	Republican nominee for Governor of Oklahoma; 1958	Succeeded by Henry Bellmon
U.S. House of Representatives
Preceded by E.W. Marland	Member of the U.S. House of Representatives from Oklahoma's 8th congressional district 1935–1941	Succeeded by Ross Rizley
