= Mountain View, Oklahoma =

- Town
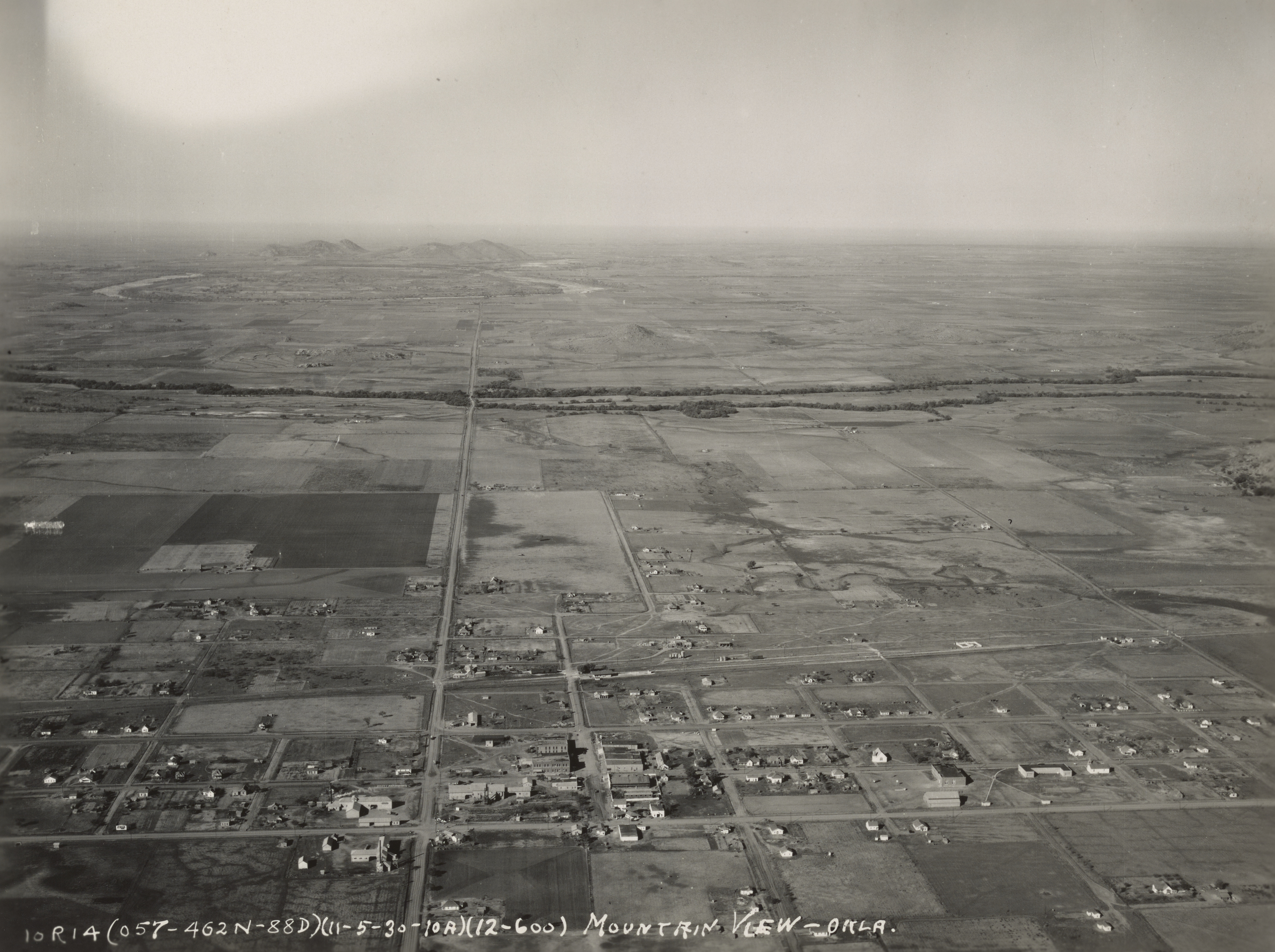
- Mountain View in 1930

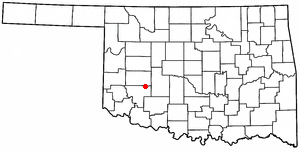
- Location of Mountain View, Oklahoma
- Coordinates: 35°05′58″N 98°44′59″W
- Country: United States
- State: Oklahoma
- County: Kiowa

Area
  - Total: 0.57 sq mi (1.47 km^{2})
  - Land: 0.57 sq mi (1.47 km^{2})
  - Water: 0 sq mi (0.00 km^{2})
- Elevation: 1,339 ft (408 m)

Population (2020)
  - Total: 740
  - Density: 1,300.4/sq mi (502.09/km^{2})
- Time zone: UTC-6 (Central (CST))
  - Summer (DST): UTC-5 (CDT)
- ZIP code: 73062
- Area code: 580
- FIPS code: 40-49650
- GNIS feature ID: 2413022
- Website: mountainviewok.gov

Mountain View is a town in Kiowa County, Oklahoma, United States. Its population was 740 as of the 2020 United States census. It is situated about 23 miles east of the county seat of Hobart, at the intersection of Oklahoma State Highway 9 and Oklahoma State Highway 115.

== History ==
The Chicago, Rock Island and Pacific Railroad (Rock Island) extended a line from Chickasha to the northern part of the Kiowa, Comanche and Apache Reservation in 1899. It terminated about two miles from an existing tent city called Oakdale, consisting of a store and post office on the former Cheyenne and Arapaho Reservation. The Oakdale post office was renamed Mountain View, honoring the nearby Wichita Mountains, on October 9, 1900.

In 1903, the entire town relocated to a site closer to the railroad. The move was completed in 1904. Nicknaming itself "the City in the Woods," the town became a point for transshipping Texas cattle on the Rock Island. Cattle were unloaded from trains and allowed to graze on Kiowa, Comanche and Apache Reservation land before resuming their journey to markets. By 1910, the town had a population of 855.

Jacob Aldolphus Bryce (Delf A. 'Jelly' Bryce), born 1906 at Mountain View, was an FBI agent significant for being an exceptional marksman and fast draw, and for his dress sense.

== Geography ==
According to the United States Census Bureau, the town has a total area of 0.5 square mile (1.3 km^{2}), all land.

== Demographics ==
Historical population
Census	Pop.	Note	%±
1910	855		—
1920	917		7.3%
1930	1,025		11.8%
1940	1,075		4.9%
1950	1,009		−6.1%
1960	864		−14.4%
1970	1,110		28.5%
1980	1,189		7.1%
1990	1,086		−8.7%
2000	880		−19.0%
2010	795		−9.7%
2020	740		−6.9%
U.S. Decennial Census

=== 2020 census ===
As of the 2020 census, Mountain View had a population of 740. The median age was 40.5 years. 27.0% of residents were under the age of 18 and 22.7% of residents were 65 years of age or older. For every 100 females there were 99.5 males, and for every 100 females age 18 and over there were 93.5 males age 18 and over.

0.0% of residents lived in urban areas, while 100.0% lived in rural areas.

There were 315 households in Mountain View, of which 33.3% had children under the age of 18 living in them. Of all households, 45.4% were married-couple households, 17.8% were households with a male householder and no spouse or partner present, and 29.2% were households with a female householder and no spouse or partner present. About 24.8% of all households were made up of individuals and 11.8% had someone living alone who was 65 years of age or older.

There were 399 housing units, of which 21.1% were vacant. The homeowner vacancy rate was 3.3% and the rental vacancy rate was 10.8%.

Racial composition as of the 2020 census
Race	Number	Percent
White	564	76.2%
Black or African American	4	0.5%
American Indian and Alaska Native	103	13.9%
Asian	4	0.5%
Native Hawaiian and Other Pacific Islander	0	0.0%
Some other race	6	0.8%
Two or more races	59	8.0%
Hispanic or Latino (of any race)	39	5.3%

=== 2010 census ===
The median income for a household in the town was $21,583, and the median income for a family was $33,333. Males had a median income of $23,250 versus $19,375 for females. The per capita income for the town was $16,677. About 19.1% of families and 20.3% of the population were below the poverty line, including 14.8% of those under age 18 and 26.9% of those age 65 or over.
