= List of United States senators in the 66th Congress =

This is a complete list of United States senators during the 66th United States Congress listed by seniority from March 4, 1919, to March 3, 1921.

Order of service is based on the commencement of the senator's first term. Behind this is former service as a senator (only giving the senator seniority within their new incoming class), service as vice president, a House member, a cabinet secretary, or a governor of a state. The final factor is the population of the senator's state.

Senators who were sworn in during the middle of the Congress (up until the last senator who was not sworn in early after winning the November 1920 election) are listed at the end of the list with no number.

== Terms of service ==
| Class | Terms of service of senators that expired in years |
|---|---|
| Class 3 | Terms of service of senators that expired in 1921 (AL, AR, AZ, CA, CO, CT, FL, GA, ID, IL, IN, IA, KS, KY, LA, MD, MO, NC, ND, NH, NV, NY, OH, OK, OR, PA, SC, SD, UT, VT, WA, and WI.) |
| Class 1 | Terms of service of senators that expired in 1923 (AZ, CA, CT, DE, FL, IN, MA, MD, ME, MI, MN, MO, MS, MT, ND, NE, NJ, NM, NV, NY, OH, PA, RI, TN, TX, UT, VA, VT, WA, WI, WV, and WY.) |
| Class 2 | Terms of service of senators that expired in 1925 (AL, AR, CO, DE, GA, IA, ID, IL, KS, KY, LA, MA, ME, MI, MN, MS, MT, NC, NE, NH, NJ, NM, OK, OR, RI, SC, SD, TN, TX, VA, WV, and WY.) |

== U.S. Senate seniority list ==
U.S. Senate seniority
| Rank | Senator (party-state) | Seniority date | Other factors |
|---|---|---|---|
| 1 | Henry Cabot Lodge (R-MA) | March 4, 1893 | |
| 2 | Francis E. Warren (R-WY) | March 4, 1895 | Previously a senator |
| 3 | Knute Nelson (R-MN) | March 4, 1895 | Former governor |
| 4 | Thomas S. Martin (D-VA) | March 4, 1895 | |
| 5 | Boies Penrose (R-PA) | March 4, 1897 | |
| 6 | Charles A. Culberson (D-TX) | March 4, 1899 | Former governor |
| 7 | Porter McCumber (R-ND) | March 4, 1899 | |
| 8 | William P. Dillingham (R-VT) | October 18, 1900 | |
| 9 | Furnifold M. Simmons (D-NC) | March 4, 1901 | |
| 10 | Lee S. Overman (D-NC) | March 4, 1903 | North Carolina 15th in population (1900) |
| 11 | Reed Smoot (R-UT) | March 4, 1903 | Utah 41st in population (1900) |
| 12 | Frank B. Brandegee (R-CT) | May 10, 1905 | |
| 13 | Robert M. La Follette, Sr. (R-WI) | January 4, 1906 | |
| 14 | William Borah (R-ID) | March 4, 1907 | |
| 15 | John H. Bankhead (D-AL) | June 18, 1907 | |
| 16 | Thomas Gore (D-OK) | December 11, 1907 | "G" 7th in alphabet |
| 17 | Robert Owen (D-OK) | December 11, 1907 | "O" 15th in alphabet |
| 18 | John Walter Smith (D-MD) | March 25, 1908 | |
| 19 | Carroll S. Page (R-VT) | October 21, 1908 | |
| 20 | Albert B. Cummins (R-IA) | November 24, 1908 | |
| 21 | Wesley Jones (R-WA) | March 4, 1909 | Former representative |
| 22 | Ellison D. Smith (D-SC) | March 4, 1909 | South Carolina 24th in population (1900) |
| 23 | Duncan U. Fletcher (D-FL) | March 4, 1909 | Florida 33rd in population (1900) |
| 24 | George Chamberlain (D-OR) | March 4, 1909 | Oregon 36th in population (1900) |
| 25 | Claude A. Swanson (D-VA) | August 1, 1910 | |
| 26 | Asle Gronna (R-ND) | February 2, 1911 | |
| 27 | John S. Williams (D-MS) | March 4, 1911 | Former representative (16 years) |
| 28 | Charles Townsend (R-MI) | March 4, 1911 | Former representative (8 years) |
| 29 | Gilbert Hitchcock (D-NE) | March 4, 1911 | Former representative (6 years) |
| 30 | Miles Poindexter (R-WA) | March 4, 1911 | Former representative (2 years) |
| 31 | George P. McLean (R-CT) | March 4, 1911 | Former governor |
| 32 | Atlee Pomerene (D-OH) | March 4, 1911 | Ohio 4th in population (1910) |
| 33 | James A. Reed (D-MO) | March 4, 1911 | Missouri 7th in population (1910) |
| 34 | Henry L. Myers (D-MT) | March 4, 1911 | Montana 40th in population (1910) |
| 35 | William S. Kenyon (R-IA) | April 12, 1911 | |
| 36 | Hoke Smith (D-GA) | November 16, 1911 | |
| 37 | Marcus A. Smith (D-AZ) | April 2, 1912 | Former delegate |
| 38 | Albert B. Fall (R-NM) | April 2, 1912 | New Mexico 43rd in population (1910) |
| 39 | Henry F. Ashurst (D-AZ) | April 2, 1912 | Arizona 45th in population (1910) |
| 40 | Charles Thomas (D-CO) | January 15, 1913 | |
| 41 | Key Pittman (D-NV) | January 29, 1913 | |
| 42 | Morris Sheppard (D-TX) | February 3, 1913 | |
| 43 | Joseph E. Ransdell (D-LA) | March 4, 1913 | Former representative (14 years) |
| 44 | Joseph Robinson (R-AR) | March 4, 1913 | Former representative (10 years), former governor |
| 45 | George W. Norris (R-NE) | March 4, 1913 | Former representative (10 years) |
| 46 | John Shields (D-TN) | March 4, 1913 | Tennessee 17th in population (1910) |
| 47 | Thomas Sterling (R-SD) | March 4, 1913 | South Dakota 36th in population (1910) |
| 48 | LeBaron Colt (R-RI) | March 4, 1913 | Rhode Island 38th in population (1910) |
| 49 | Thomas J. Walsh (D-MT) | March 4, 1913 | Montana 40th in population (1910) |
| 50 | Lawrence Sherman (R-IL) | March 26, 1913 | |
| 51 | Charles Curtis (R-KS) | March 4, 1915 | Previously a senator |
| 52 | Oscar Underwood (D-AL) | March 4, 1915 | Former representative |
| 53 | John C. W. Beckham (D-KY) | March 4, 1915 | Former governor |
| 54 | James Wadsworth, Jr. (R-NY) | March 4, 1915 | New York 1st in population (1910) |
| 55 | Warren G. Harding (R-OH) | March 4, 1915 | Ohio 4th in population (1910) |
| 56 | James D. Phelan (D-CA) | March 4, 1915 | California 12th in population (1910) |
| 57 | Edwin S. Johnson (D-SD) | March 4, 1915 | South Dakota 36th in population (1910) |
| 58 | Bert Fernald (R-ME) | September 12, 1916 | |
| 59 | James Watson (R-IN) | November 8, 1916 | Former representative |
| 60 | William F. Kirby (D-AR) | November 8, 1916 | |
| 61 | Philander C. Knox (R-PA) | March 4, 1917 | Previously a senator |
| 62 | William M. Calder (R-NY) | March 4, 1917 | Former representative (10 years) |
| 63 | Kenneth McKellar (D-TN) | March 4, 1917 | Former representative (6 years) |
| 64 | Howard Sutherland (R-WV) | March 4, 1917 | Former representative (4 years) |
| 65 | William H. King (D-UT) | March 4, 1917 | Former representative (3 years) |
| 66 | Peter G. Gerry (D-RI) | March 4, 1917 | Former representative (2 years) |
| 67 | Park Trammell (D-FL) | March 4, 1917 | Former governor, Florida 33rd in population (1910) |
| 68 | John B. Kendrick (D-WY) | March 4, 1917 | Former governor, Wyoming 47th in population (1910) |
| 69 | Harry S. New (R-IN) | March 4, 1917 | Indiana 9th in population (1910) |
| 70 | Joseph S. Frelinghuysen (R-NJ) | March 4, 1917 | New Jersey 11th in population (1910) |
| 71 | Frank B. Kellogg (R-MN) | March 4, 1917 | Minnesota 19th in population (1910) |
| 72 | Joseph I. France (R-MD) | March 4, 1917 | Maryland 27th in population (1910) |
| 73 | Frederick Hale (R-ME) | March 4, 1917 | Maine 34th in population (1910) |
| 74 | Andrieus Jones (R-NM) | March 4, 1917 | New Mexico 43rd in population (1910) |
| 75 | Josiah Wolcott (D-DE) | March 4, 1917 | Delaware 46th in population (1910) |
| 76 | Hiram Johnson (R-CA) | March 16, 1917 | |
| 77 | Charles Henderson (D-NV) | January 12, 1918 | |
| 78 | John F. Nugent (D-ID) | January 22, 1918 | |
| 79 | Irvine Lenroot (R-WI) | April 18, 1918 | |
| 80 | Selden P. Spencer (R-MO) | November 6, 1918 | Missouri 7th in population (1910) |
| 81 | Edward J. Gay (D-LA) | November 6, 1918 | Louisiana 24th in population (1910) |
| 82 | George H. Moses (R-NH) | November 6, 1918 | New Hampshire 39th in population (1910) |
| 83 | Charles L. McNary (R-OR) | December 18, 1918 | |
| 84 | Heisler Ball (R-DE) | March 4, 1919 | Previously a senator (2 years) |
| 85 | Davis Elkins (R-WV) | March 4, 1919 | Previously a senator (1 year) |
| 86 | Medill McCormick (R-IL) | March 4, 1919 | Former representative (2 years) |
| 87 | Truman Newberry (R-MI) | March 4, 1919 | Former cabinet member |
| 88 | David I. Walsh (D-MA) | March 4, 1919 | Former governor, Massachusetts 6th in population (1910) |
| 89 | Arthur Capper (R-KS) | March 4, 1919 | Former governor, Kansas 22nd in population (1910) |
| 90 | Henry W. Keyes (R-NH) | March 4, 1919 | Former governor, New Hampshire 39th in population (1910) |
| 91 | William J. Harris (D-GA) | March 4, 1919 | Georgia 10th in population (1910) |
| 92 | Nathaniel Dial (D-SC) | March 4, 1919 | South Carolina 26th in population (1910) |
| 93 | Lawrence C. Phipps (R-CO) | March 4, 1919 | Colorado 32nd in population (1910) |
| | Pat Harrison (D-MS) | March 5, 1919 | |
| | Augustus O. Stanley (D-KY) | May 19, 1919 | Former representative (12 years) |
| | Walter E. Edge (R-NJ) | May 19, 1919 | |
| | Carter Glass (D-VA) | February 2, 1920 | |
| | B. B. Comer (D-AL) | March 5, 1920 | |
| | James Thomas Heflin (D-AL) | November 2, 1920 | |
| | Frank B. Willis (R-OH) | January 14, 1921 | |
| | Frank R. Gooding (R-ID) | January 15, 1921 | |

== See also ==
- 66th United States Congress
- List of United States representatives in the 66th Congress
