= George H. Wilson =

American attorney, Congressman, and judge (1905–1985)

George Howard Wilson
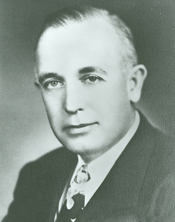

Member of the U.S. House of Representatives from Oklahoma's 8th district
- In office January 3, 1949 – January 3, 1951
- Preceded by: Ross Rizley
- Succeeded by: Page Belcher

Personal details
- Born: August 21, 1905 Mattoon, Illinois, U.S.
- Died: July 16, 1985 (aged 79) Enid, Oklahoma, U.S.
- Party: Democratic
- Spouse: Myrna Kathryn Reams
- Education: Phillips University; University of Oklahoma College of Law
- Profession: Lawyer

Military service
- Allegiance: United States
- Branch/service: United States Army
- Years of service: 1942–1946
- Rank: Colonel
- Unit: Judge Advocate General
- Battles/wars: World War II

George Howard Wilson (August 21, 1905 – July 16, 1985) was an American attorney, FBI agent, U.S. Representative from Oklahoma, and judge.

== Early life and education ==
Born in Mattoon, Illinois, Wilson moved with his parents in 1910 to Enid. There he attended Enid Public Schools. He graduated from Phillips University in 1926. He studied at the University of Michigan Law School in 1926 and 1927, and graduated from the law school of the University of Oklahoma in 1929. He was admitted to the bar in 1928 and joined his father's law practice in 1929 in Enid, Oklahoma.

== Career ==
=== Military service ===
During World War II, Wilson ranked as Colonel within the Judge Advocate General's Department of the United States Army, serving overseas in the South Atlantic Theater of Operations from 1942 to 1946.

=== Congressional term ===
Wilson was elected as a Democrat to the 81st Congress (January 3, 1949 – January 3, 1951). During his term, Wilson was on the Committee on Interstate and Foreign Commerce, and the Subcommittee on Public Health, Science, and Commerce. With his colleagues he was tasked with considering legislation for a national health program, and toured western Europe for investigation purposes. In 1950, he lost his election bid for the 82nd Congress.

=== Legal and judicial career ===
Wilson served as a deputy district court clerk of Garfield County, Oklahoma in 1928. He was a special agent with the Federal Bureau of Investigation from 1934 to 1938. From 1939 to 1942, he was the city attorney of Enid, Oklahoma. Following his congressional service he directed the Oklahoma State Crime Bureau in 1951. Wilson was an Oklahoma Supreme Court justice from 1952 to 1968, Chief judge of State Administrative Zone No. 1 in 1967, district judge, 1969, and Chief judge, Division No. 1, Judicial District No. 4. Judge Wilson served as President of the Oklahoma Judicial Conference in 1968.

== Personal life and death ==
He had four children with wife Myrna Kathryn Reams, whom he married in 1929. He continued to reside in Enid, Oklahoma until his death on July 16, 1985, and was interred in Memorial Park Cemetery.

U.S. House of Representatives
Preceded by Ross Rizley	Member of the U.S. House of Representatives from Oklahoma's 8th congressional district 1949–1951	Succeeded by Page H. Belcher
