= Charles Swindall =

American judge

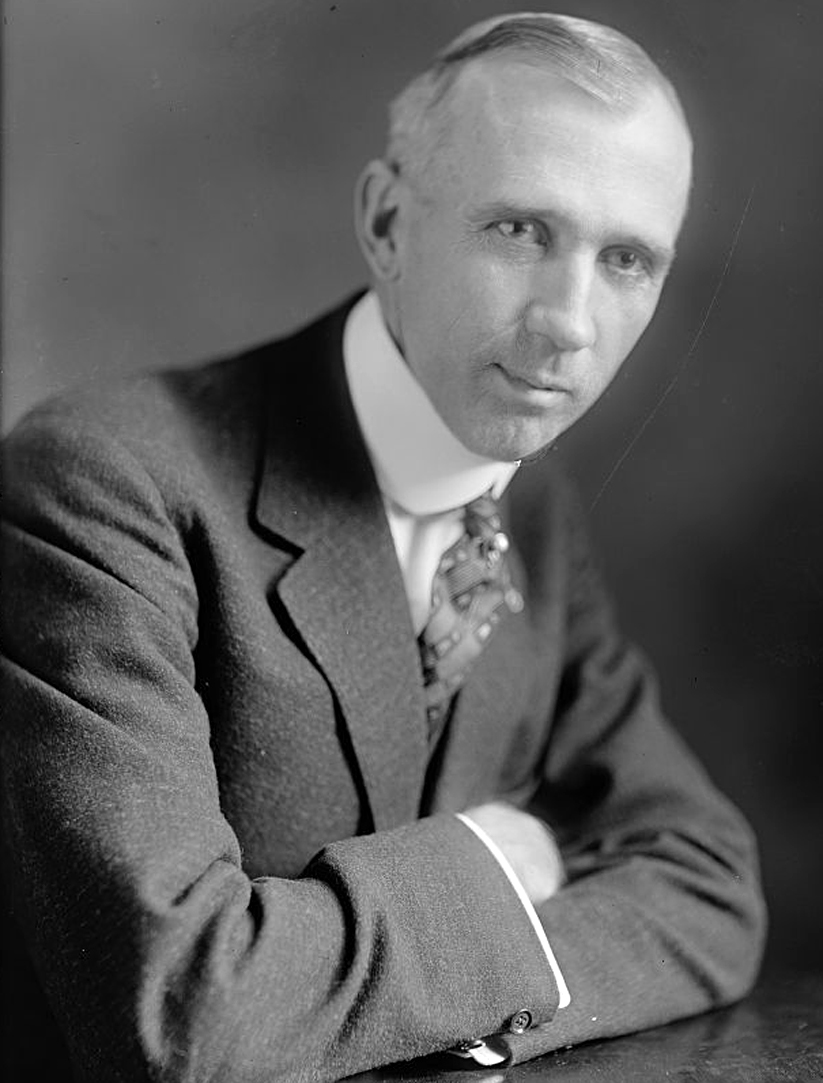

Member of the U.S. House of Representatives from Oklahoma's 8th district
- In office November 2, 1920 – March 3, 1921
- Preceded by: Dick T. Morgan
- Succeeded by: Manuel Herrick

Personal details
- Born: February 13, 1876 Terrell, Texas, U.S.
- Died: June 19, 1939 (aged 63) Oklahoma City, Oklahoma, U.S.
- Party: Republican
- Spouse: Emma Endres
- Education: Vanderbilt University; Cumberland School of Law
- Profession: Lawyer

Charles Swindall (February 13, 1876 – June 19, 1939) was a U.S. representative from Oklahoma.

== Early life ==
Born at College Mound near Terrell, Texas, Swindall attended the public schools and Vanderbilt University, Nashville, Tennessee. He graduated from Cumberland School of Law at Cumberland University, Lebanon, Tennessee, in 1897.

== Career ==
Charles Swindall was admitted to the bar the same year and commenced practice in Woodward, Oklahoma. Swindall was the prosecuting attorney of Day (later Ellis) County 1898–1900. In 1900, he returned to Woodward to continue his law practice, working primarily with the Texas Cattle Raisers Association on cattle rustling cases, achieving 33 convictions.

=== Congressional Service ===
In the 1916 Republican National Convention, Swindall served as an Oklahoma delegate. He was a member of the Oklahoma State Republican Committee from 1919 to 1929. Swindall was elected as a Republican to the Sixty-sixth Congress to fill the vacancy caused by the death of Dick T. Morgan, and served from November 2, 1920, to March 3, 1921, serving on the Public Land Committee. Following his unsuccessful bid for renomination to the Sixty-seventh Congress, he returned to his practice in Woodward, Oklahoma.

=== Judicial Service ===
He was appointed April 26, 1924, judge of the twentieth judicial district of Oklahoma. Swindall holds the title of the first Oklahoma judge to give a death sentence for committing a robbery with firearms. However, the defendant's sentence was later reduced to life imprisonment.

He served as a justice of the Oklahoma Supreme Court from 1929 to 1934. Swindall refused to be partisan in his nominees, preferring to judge candidates on their qualifications, not their loyalty to a particular party. Wanting Swindall to only support Republicans, the Oklahoma State Election Board refused Swindall's renomination to his post. Swindall sued the Board and was victorious in his suit, but did not win re-election.

Following his judicial appointments, he resumed the practice of law in Oklahoma City, Oklahoma.

== Personal life and death ==
In 1911 Charles Swindall and Emma Endres were wed. Charles Swindall died of a heart attack on June 19, 1939, in Oklahoma City, and was interred in Memorial Park Cemetery.

== Sources ==
- United States Congress. "Charles Swindall (id: S001121)". Biographical Directory of the United States Congress.

U.S. House of Representatives
Preceded by Dick T. Morgan	Member of the U.S. House of Representatives from Oklahoma's 8th congressional district 1920 – 1921	Succeeded by Manuel Herrick
