= Ross Rizley =

American judge (1892–1969)

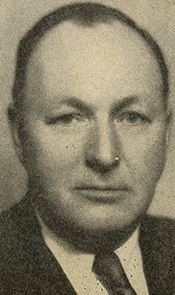

Judge of the United States District Court for the Western District of Oklahoma
- In office April 13, 1956 – March 4, 1969
- Appointed by: Dwight D. Eisenhower
- Preceded by: Edgar Sullins Vaught
- Succeeded by: Seat abolished

Member of the U.S. House of Representatives from Oklahoma's 8th district
- In office January 3, 1941 – January 3, 1949
- Preceded by: Phil Ferguson
- Succeeded by: George H. Wilson

Personal details
- Born: Roscoe Rizley; July 5, 1892 Beaver County, Oklahoma Territory
- Died: March 4, 1969 (aged 76) Oklahoma City, Oklahoma, U.S.
- Resting place: Elmhurst Cemetery; Guymon, Oklahoma
- Party: Republican
- Children: Claudia Bryar
- Education: University of Kansas City (LL.B.)

Ross Rizley (born Roscoe Rizley) (July 5, 1892 – March 4, 1969) was an American politician and United States representative from Oklahoma and a United States district judge of the United States District Court for the Western District of Oklahoma.

== Education and career ==
Born on a farm near the town of Beaver in Beaver County of the Oklahoma Territory, the son of Anabella Narcissus (McCown) and Robert Martin Rizley, Rizley attended the public schools and taught in the rural schools of Beaver County in 1909 and 1910. He served as a deputy register of deeds in Beaver County in 1911 and 1912. He received a Bachelor of Laws from the Kansas City School of Law (now the University of Missouri–Kansas City School of Law) in 1915 and was admitted to the bar in Oklahoma the same year. He was in private practice of law in Beaver from 1915 to 1920. He was county attorney of Beaver County from 1918 to 1920. He was in private practice of law in Guymon, Oklahoma from 1920 to 1956. He was a member of the Guymon Board of Education from 1924 to 1932. He was city attorney of Guymon from 1928 to 1938. He was a member of the Oklahoma Senate from 1931 to 1934. He was a candidate for Governor of Oklahoma in the 1938 election. He was a United States representative from Oklahoma from 1941 to 1949. He was solicitor for the United States Post Office Department (now the United States Postal Service) in 1953. He was an Assistant United States Secretary of Agriculture from 1953 to 1954. He was Chairman of the Civil Aeronautics Board from 1955 to 1956.

== Congressional service ==
Rizley was elected as a Republican United States Representative to the United States House of Representatives of the 77th United States Congress and of the three succeeding Congresses, serving from January 3, 1941 to January 3, 1949. He was Chairman of the Special Committee on Campaign Expenditures in the 80th United States Congress. He was a delegate to the Republican National Conventions in 1932, 1936, and 1948. Rizley was elected chairman of the credentials committee for the 1952 Republican National Convention, defeating Minnesota delegate Warren E. Burger. He was not a candidate for renomination to the House in 1948 but was unsuccessful for election to the United States Senate.

== Federal judicial service ==
Rizley was nominated by President Dwight D. Eisenhower on February 10, 1956, to a seat on the United States District Court for the Western District of Oklahoma vacated by Judge Edgar Sullins Vaught. He was confirmed by the United States Senate on March 1, 1956, and received his commission on April 13, 1956. On March 26, 1965, President Lyndon B. Johnson certified Rizley involuntarily as disabled in accordance with the act of September 2, 1957, 71 Stat. 586, which entitled the President to appoint an additional judge for the court and provided that no successor to the judge certified as disabled be appointed. Luther Boyd Eubanks was appointed to the additional judgeship. Rizley continued to render a reduced level of service to the court. His service was terminated on March 4, 1969, due to his death in Oklahoma City, Oklahoma. He was interred in Elmhurst Cemetery in Guymon.

== Personal ==
Rizley married Ruby Seal in 1916 and they had seven children, one of whom, Hortense, would become actress Claudia Bryar.

Party political offices
Preceded by William B. Pine	Republican nominee for Governor of Oklahoma; 1938	Succeeded by William Otjen
Preceded by Edward H. Moore	Republican nominee for U.S. Senator from Oklahoma (Class 2); 1948	Succeeded by Fred M. Mock
U.S. House of Representatives
Preceded by Phil Ferguson	Member of the U.S. House of Representatives from Oklahoma's 8th congressional district 1941–1949	Succeeded by George H. Wilson
Legal offices
Preceded by Edgar Sullins Vaught	Judge of the United States District Court for the Western District of Oklahoma; 1956–1969	Succeeded by Seat abolished
