= Jacob Aldolphus Bryce =

American policeman, FBI agent, and marksman

Jacob Aldolphus Bryce (Delf A. 'Jelly' Bryce)
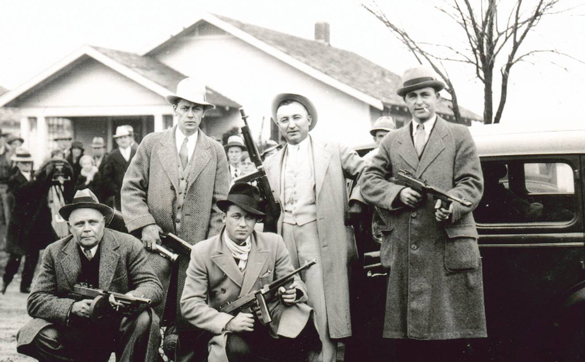
- 'Jelly' Bryce crouched center
- Born: December 6, 1906; Mountain View, Oklahoma, U.S.
- Died: May 12, 1974 (aged 67); Mountain View, Oklahoma
- Resting place: Mountain View, Oklahoma
- Occupation: FBI Agent

Jacob Aldolphus Bryce (December 6, 1906 – May 12, 1974), also known as Delf A. 'Jelly' Bryce, was an Oklahoma City policeman and an FBI agent, active from 1928 to 1958. He was significant for being an exceptional marksman and fast draw, and for his dress sense.

== Career ==
In 1927 Bryce became an Oklahoma State game agent, but resigned, intending to pursue college. Following this and during a shooting competition at Shawnee, Oklahoma, Bryce's marksmanship was noticed by an Oklahoma City Police Department night chief who suggested that he should join his police department, which he did in 1928 at age 22, the youngest detective in the department. On his second day with Oklahoma City police Auto Theft Bureau Bryce confronted a thief trying to hot-wire a car. He identified himself as a police officer, after which the suspect drew a pistol; Bryce then drew his and wounded the criminal. Later he rescued a fellow officer from a moving car who was fighting off three criminals; he jumped on the running board and shot two of the criminals. When confronted, one of the dying men said, "I can't believe I was killed by a Jelly Bean like you." A jelly bean was a slang term for a dapper dresser, for which Bryce had a lifelong reputation, and the nickname 'Jelly' stuck.

During his first year, while patrolling in a police car, he confronted two thieves attempting to break into furniture store premises. After Bryce demanded their surrender they both fired pistols; Bryce then drew and fired twice, killing both men. Also while with the Department he attempted to apprehend a wanted gangster who drew his gun and opened fire. Bryce drew his gun in reply and wounded the criminal, who managed to escape into a nearby theater where he later died.

On July 18, 1934, Bryce, with other officers, was searching for Harvey Pugh (a wanted killer and criminal associate of Clyde Barrow), and his accomplices Ray O'Donnell and Tom Walton. Bryce's information put them at the Wren Hotel, run by a woman named Merle Bolen. Led to a room by Bolen's mother, Bryce found Walton, and O'Donnell in bed with Bolen. O'Donnell faced Bryce pointing a Colt 1911 in each hand. Bryce drew his gun and killed him. Following this incident, Bryce was recruited by the Federal Bureau of Investigation (FBI) as a Special Agent.

While in the FBI he was assigned to different locations, including as Special Agent in Charge (SAC) at the El Paso field office in 1941, and SAC at Albuquerque, New Mexico, but spent most of his career in Oklahoma City, becoming Oklahoma City FBI agency head in 1956. He also demonstrated and taught his shooting methods at the FBI Academy. His life and policing style was featured in magazines Life (1945) and Look (1946). Following his retirement he filed as a Democrat for the Governor of Oklahoma, but fought as an independent, failing to be elected. Afterwards he became a farmer near Mountain View and participated in shooting exhibitions.

== Personal life ==
Bryce was born on December 6, 1906, at Mountain View, Oklahoma, to Fel Albert Bryce and his wife Maggie Meek. He attended Mountain View High School, graduating in 1926, after which he moved to the city of Seminole to work in a grocery store before becoming a police detective and FBI agent. He married firstly Frances Maxine Wilson, the marriage producing their son, William Delf; they divorced in 1932, and she died from injuries sustained in a 1973 car crash. In 1944 he married Shirley Geraldine Bloodworth, the marriage producing their son, John Fel.

Bryce died of a suspected heart attack on May 12, 1974, while attending an FBI reunion at the Shangri-la Lodge near Grand Lake. He was buried at Mountain View.

== Media and further reading ==
- "Jelly Bryce: The Perfect Shot", Cineflix production of American Lawmen, Season 1, Episode 6 (2016)
- Conti, Mike, Jelly Bryce: the legend begins, Saber Press (2014), ISBN 0977265978
- Conti, Mike, Jelly Bryce: FBI Odyssey, Saber Press (2015), ISBN 0996530207
- Conti, Mike, Jelly Bryce: the man in the mirror, Saber Press (2016), ISBN 0996530290
