= Oklahoma's 8th congressional district =

Former U.S. House district from 1913 to 1953

- Obsolete district
- Created: 1915
- Eliminated: 1950
- Years active: 1915-1953

Oklahoma's 8th congressional district is an obsolete district from Oklahoma. It was added in 1915, and was eliminated in 1953. In its final configuration, it covered much of north-central Oklahoma, including Enid. Most of its territory was merged with the Tulsa-based Oklahoma's 1st congressional district. The last congressman from the 8th District, Page Belcher, transferred to the 1st.

== List of representatives ==
Name	Party	Years	Cong– ress	Electoral history
District established March 4, 1915
Dick T. Morgan (Woodward)	Republican	March 4, 1915 – July 4, 1920	64th 65th 66th	Redistricted from the 2nd district and re-elected in 1914. Re-elected in 1916. Re-elected in 1918. Died.
Vacant		July 4, 1920 – November 2, 1920	66th	
Charles Swindall (Woodward)	Republican	November 2, 1920 – March 3, 1921	66th	Elected to finish Morgan's term. Lost renomination.
Manuel Herrick (Perry)	Republican	March 4, 1921 – March 3, 1923	67th	Elected in 1920. Lost renomination.
Milton C. Garber (Enid)	Republican	March 4, 1923 – March 3, 1933	68th 69th 70th 71st 72nd	Elected in 1922. Re-elected in 1924. Re-elected in 1926. Re-elected in 1928. Re-elected in 1930. Lost re-election.
E. W. Marland (Ponca City)	Democratic	March 4, 1933 – January 3, 1935	73rd	Elected in 1932. Retired to run for Governor of Oklahoma.
Phil Ferguson (Woodward)	Democratic	January 3, 1935 – January 3, 1941	74th 75th 76th	Elected in 1934. Re-elected in 1936. Re-elected in 1938. Lost re-election.
Ross Rizley (Guymon)	Republican	January 3, 1941 – January 3, 1949	77th 78th 79th 80th	Elected in 1940. Re-elected in 1942. Re-elected in 1944. Re-elected in 1946. Retired to run for U.S. senator.
George H. Wilson (Enid)	Democratic	January 3, 1949 – January 3, 1951	81st	Elected in 1948. Lost re-election.
Page Belcher (Enid)	Republican	January 3, 1951 – January 3, 1953	82nd	Elected in 1950. Redistricted to the 1st district.
District dissolved January 3, 1953
