= Dick T. Morgan =

American politician

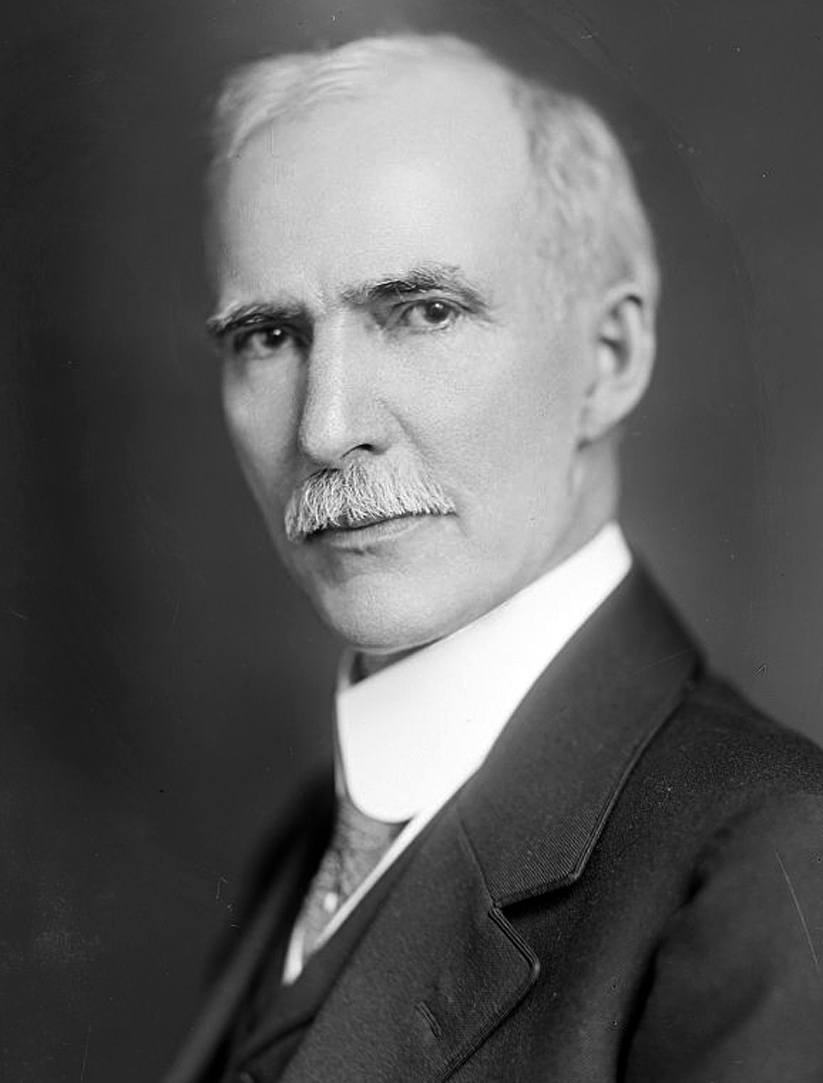

Member of the U.S. House of Representatives from Oklahoma
- In office March 4, 1909 – July 4, 1920
- Preceded by: Elmer L. Fulton
- Succeeded by: Charles Swindall
- Constituency: 2nd district (1909–1915); 8th district (1915–1920)

Member of the Illinois House of Representatives
- In office 1880-1881

Personal details
- Born: Dick Thompson Morgan; December 6, 1853 Prairie Creek, Indiana, U.S.
- Died: July 4, 1920 (aged 66) Danville, Illinois, U.S.
- Resting place: Rose Hill Burial Park in Oklahoma City, Oklahoma
- Party: Republican
- Spouse: Ora Heath
- Children: 1
- Education: Union Christian College; Central Law School
- Profession: Lawyer

Dick Thompson Morgan (December 6, 1853 – July 4, 1920) was an American educator, lawyer and politician who served six terms as a U.S. representative from Oklahoma from 1909 to 1920.

== Early life and education ==
Born at Prairie Creek, Indiana, a few miles southwest of Terre Haute, Indiana, Morgan attended the country schools and the Prairie Creek High School. In 1876 he received a bachelor's degree and in 1878 a master's degree both from Union Christian College, Merom, Indiana. He became a professor of mathematics in that college. He then graduated from Central Law School, Indianapolis, Indiana, in 1880.

== Career ==
Morgan was admitted to the bar in 1880 and commenced practice in Terre Haute, Indiana. Morgan served as member of the Illinois House of Representatives in 1880 and 1881. He was appointed register of the United States land office at Woodward in Oklahoma Territory, by President Theodore Roosevelt in 1904 and served until May 1, 1908.

=== Congress ===
Morgan was elected as a Republican to the Sixty-first and to the five succeeding Congresses. Beginning on March 3, 1909, he represented the 2nd district. In 1915, after redistricting due to the 1910 Census, he represented the 8th congressional district until his unexpected death in 1920. He was once known as the "father of the Federal Trade Commission."

Morgan introduced the first bill to establish such a commission on January 12, 1912, made the first speech on the House floor urging its adoption on February 21, 1912, and reintroduced a slightly amended version of the bill in 1913. He was a member of the Claims, Railways and Canals, Expenditures in the Treasury Department, Public Lands, and Judiciary committees. Morgan also became an expert on Rural Credits, sponsoring the 1916 rural credits law that created the federal land bank system.

== Personal life ==
In 1878 he married Ora Heath. Their son, Porter Heath Morgan, was born in 1880.

== Death and burial ==
On July 4, 1920, Morgan died of pneumonia in Danville, Illinois, while returning from Washington, D.C. to Oklahoma. Dick Thompson Morgan is interred in Rose Hill Burial Park in Oklahoma City, Oklahoma.

== Publications ==
- Morgan's Digest of Oklahoma Statutes and Supreme Court Decisions (1897)
- Morgan's Manual of the United States Homestead, Township, and Mining Laws (1900)
- Morgan's School Land Manual (1901)
- Land Credits: A Plea for the American Farmer (1915)
- Served as President and Treasurer of the Western Investment Co. (El Reno, Oklahoma 1901–1904), the publisher of the periodical Oklahoma Real Estate Register.

== See also ==
- List of members of the United States Congress who died in office (1900–1949)

U.S. House of Representatives
Preceded by Elmer L. Fulton	Member of the U.S. House of Representatives from Oklahoma's 2nd congressional district 1909 – 1915	Succeeded by William W. Hastings
Preceded by None	Member of the U.S. House of Representatives from Oklahoma's 8th congressional district 1915 – 1920	Succeeded by Charles Swindall
