= List of United States representatives from Alaska =

The following is an alphabetical list of United States representatives from Alaska's at-large congressional district, and thus the state of Alaska. For chronological tables of members of both houses of the United States Congress from the state (through the present day), see Alaska's congressional delegations. It includes members who have represented both the state and the territory, both past and present.

== Current member ==
As of January 3, 2025

- Nick Begich III (R), (since 2025)

== List of members and delegates ==
Member	Party	Years	District	Residence	Electoral history
Bob Bartlett	Democratic	January 3, 1945 – January 3, 1959	Territory	Juneau	Elected in 1944. Retired to run for U.S. Senator.
Nick Begich Sr.	Democratic	January 3, 1971 – December 29, 1972	At-large	Anchorage	Elected in 1970. Went missing and declared dead.
Nick Begich III	Republican	January 3, 2025 – present	At-large	Chugiak	Elected in 2024. Incumbent.
Thomas Cale	Independent	March 4, 1907 – March 3, 1909	Territory	Fairbanks	Elected in 1906. Retired.
Anthony Dimond	Democratic	March 4, 1933 – January 3, 1945	Territory	Valdez	Elected in 1932. Retired.
George Barnes Grigsby	Democratic	July 1, 1919 – March 1, 1921	Territory	Juneau	Elected to finish Sulzer's term. Lost election contest.
Mary Peltola	Democratic	September 13, 2022 – January 3, 2025	At-large	Bethel	Elected to finish Young's term. Lost re-election.
Howard Pollock	Republican	January 3, 1967 – January 3, 1971	At-large	Anchorage	Elected in 1966. Retired to run for Governor of Alaska.
Ralph Julian Rivers	Democratic	January 3, 1959 – December 30, 1966	At-large	Fairbanks	Elected in 1958. Lost re-election, then resigned.
Charles August Sulzer	Democratic	March 4, 1917 – January 7, 1919	Territory	Prince of Wales Island	Elected in 1916. Lost election contest.
Charles August Sulzer	Democratic	March 4, 1919 – April 28, 1919	Territory	Prince of Wales Island	Elected in 1918. Died.
Daniel Sutherland	Republican	March 4, 1921 – March 3, 1931	Territory	Juneau	Elected in 1920. Retired.
Frank Hinman Waskey	Democratic	August 14, 1906 – March 3, 1907	Territory	Nome	Elected in 1906. Retired.
James Wickersham	Republican	March 4, 1909 – March 3, 1917	Territory	Fairbanks	Elected in 1908. Lost re-election.
James Wickersham	Republican	January 7, 1919 – March 3, 1919	Territory	Fairbanks	Successfully contested Sulzer's election. Lost re-election.
James Wickersham	Republican	March 1, 1921 – March 3, 1921	Territory	Fairbanks	Successfully contested Grigsby's election. Retired.
James Wickersham	Republican	March 4, 1931 – March 3, 1933	Territory	Juneau	Elected in 1930. Lost re-election.
Don Young	Republican	March 6, 1973 – March 18, 2022	At-large	Fort Yukon	Elected to finish Begich's term. Died.

== See also ==
- Alaska's congressional delegations
- Alaska's congressional districts
- List of United States senators from Alaska
