= Political party strength in Alaska =

Politics in the US state of Alaska

The following table indicates the parties of elected officials in the U.S. state of Alaska:

- Governor, including pre-statehood governors, who were appointed by the U.S. president and usually of the same political party; and
- Lieutenant Governor

The table also indicates the historical party composition in the:

- Territorial and State Senate
- Territorial and State House of Representatives
- State delegation to the United States Senate
- State delegation to the United States House of Representatives, including non-voting delegates elected pre-statehood

For years in which a United States presidential election was held, the table indicates which party's nominees received the state's electoral votes.

== Pre-statehood (1884–1958) ==
Year	Executive offices	Territorial Legislature		United States Congress
Year	Governor	Senate	House	Delegate
1884	John Henry Kinkead (R)	no such bodies		no such office
1885	Alfred P. Swineford (D)	no such bodies		no such office
…	Alfred P. Swineford (D)	no such bodies		no such office
1888	Alfred P. Swineford (D)	no such bodies		no such office
1889	Lyman Enos Knapp (R)	no such bodies		no such office
…	Lyman Enos Knapp (R)	no such bodies		no such office
1892	Lyman Enos Knapp (R)	no such bodies		no such office
1893	James Sheakley (D)	no such bodies		no such office
…	James Sheakley (D)	no such bodies		no such office
1896	James Sheakley (D)	no such bodies		no such office
1897	John Green Brady (R)	no such bodies		no such office
…	John Green Brady (R)	no such bodies		no such office
1905	John Green Brady (R)	no such bodies		no such office
1906	Wilford Bacon Hoggatt (R)	no such bodies		Frank Hinman Waskey (D)
1907	Wilford Bacon Hoggatt (R)	no such bodies		Thomas Cale (I)
1908	Wilford Bacon Hoggatt (R)	no such bodies		Thomas Cale (I)
1909	Walter Eli Clark (R)	no such bodies		James Wickersham (R)
1910	Walter Eli Clark (R)	no such bodies		James Wickersham (R)
1911	Walter Eli Clark (R)	no such bodies		James Wickersham (R)
1912	Walter Eli Clark (R)	no such bodies		James Wickersham (R)
1913	John Franklin; Alexander Strong (D)	3NP, 2D, 1I, 1IR, 1R	10NP, 2R, 1D, 1IR, 1PH, 1 vac.	James Wickersham (R)
1914	John Franklin; Alexander Strong (D)	3NP, 2D, 1I, 1IR, 1R	10NP, 2R, 1D, 1IR, 1PH, 1 vac.	James Wickersham (R)
1915	John Franklin; Alexander Strong (D)	3D, 3NP, 1I, 1Prog	7NP, 3D, 3I, 1H, 1ID, 1R	James Wickersham (R)
1916	John Franklin; Alexander Strong (D)	3D, 3NP, 1I, 1Prog	7NP, 3D, 3I, 1H, 1ID, 1R	James Wickersham (R)
1917	John Franklin; Alexander Strong (D)	3D, 2NP, 1IR, 1Prog, 1R	7D, 6R, 2I, 1PD	Charles A. Sulzer (D)
1918	Thomas Riggs Jr. (D)	3D, 2NP, 1IR, 1Prog, 1R	7D, 6R, 2I, 1PD	Charles A. Sulzer (D)
1919	Thomas Riggs Jr. (D)	5D, 2NP, 1IR	11D, 4R, 1I	James Wickersham (R)
1919	Thomas Riggs Jr. (D)	5D, 2NP, 1IR	11D, 4R, 1I	Charles A. Sulzer (D) (Note: Died in office.)
1919	Thomas Riggs Jr. (D)	5D, 2NP, 1IR	11D, 4R, 1I	vacant
1920	Thomas Riggs Jr. (D)	5D, 2NP, 1IR	11D, 4R, 1I	vacant
1920	Thomas Riggs Jr. (D)	5D, 2NP, 1IR	11D, 4R, 1I	George B. Grigsby (D)
1921	Scott Cordelle Bone (R)	4D, 3R, 1IR	11R, 2I, 1D, 1ID, 1IR	James Wickersham (R)
1921	Scott Cordelle Bone (R)	4D, 3R, 1IR	11R, 2I, 1D, 1ID, 1IR	Daniel Sutherland (R)
1922	Scott Cordelle Bone (R)	4D, 3R, 1IR	11R, 2I, 1D, 1ID, 1IR	Daniel Sutherland (R)
1923	Scott Cordelle Bone (R)	5R, 2I, 1D	11R, 4I, 1D	Daniel Sutherland (R)
1924	Scott Cordelle Bone (R)	5R, 2I, 1D	11R, 4I, 1D	Daniel Sutherland (R)
1925	George Alexander Parks (R)	4R, 2D, 2I	9R, 4D, 2I, 1IR	Daniel Sutherland (R)
1926	George Alexander Parks (R)	4R, 2D, 2I	9R, 4D, 2I, 1IR	Daniel Sutherland (R)
1927	George Alexander Parks (R)	5R, 2I, 1D	12R, 3D, 1I	Daniel Sutherland (R)
1928	George Alexander Parks (R)	5R, 2I, 1D	12R, 3D, 1I	Daniel Sutherland (R)
1929	George Alexander Parks (R)	5R, 2D, 1I	9R, 3D, 3I, 1IR	Daniel Sutherland (R)
1930	George Alexander Parks (R)	5R, 2D, 1I	9R, 3D, 3I, 1IR	Daniel Sutherland (R)
1931	George Alexander Parks (R)	4D, 4R	11R, 4D, 1I	James Wickersham (R)
1931	George Alexander Parks (R)	4R, 3D, 1 vac. (Note: A Democratic senator died 17 days after the legislative session began. The seat was left vacant and the legislature continued with a Democratic Senate president.)	11R, 4D, 1I	James Wickersham (R)
1932	George Alexander Parks (R)	4R, 3D, 1 vac.	11R, 4D, 1I	James Wickersham (R)
1933	John Weir Troy (D)	6D, 2R	12D, 4R	Anthony Dimond (D)
1934	John Weir Troy (D)	6D, 2R	12D, 4R	Anthony Dimond (D)
1935	John Weir Troy (D)	8D	15D, 1R	Anthony Dimond (D)
1936	John Weir Troy (D)	8D	15D, 1R	Anthony Dimond (D)
1937	John Weir Troy (D)	8D	14D, 2R	Anthony Dimond (D)
1938	John Weir Troy (D)	8D	14D, 2R	Anthony Dimond (D)
1939	John Weir Troy (D)	7D, 1R	16D	Anthony Dimond (D)
1940	Ernest Gruening (D)	7D, 1R	16D	Anthony Dimond (D)
1941	Ernest Gruening (D)	7D, 1R	14D, 2R	Anthony Dimond (D)
1942	Ernest Gruening (D)	7D, 1R	14D, 2R	Anthony Dimond (D)
1943	Ernest Gruening (D)	7D, 1R	16D	Anthony Dimond (D)
1944	Ernest Gruening (D)	7D, 1R	16D	Anthony Dimond (D)
1945	Ernest Gruening (D)	14D, 2R	20D, 4R	Bob Bartlett (D)
1946	Ernest Gruening (D)	14D, 2R	20D, 4R	Bob Bartlett (D)
1947	Ernest Gruening (D)	9D, 7R	13R, 11D	Bob Bartlett (D)
1948	Ernest Gruening (D)	9D, 7R	13R, 11D	Bob Bartlett (D)
1949	Ernest Gruening (D)	9D, 7R	19D, 5R	Bob Bartlett (D)
1950	Ernest Gruening (D)	9D, 7R	19D, 5R	Bob Bartlett (D)
1951	Ernest Gruening (D)	9D, 7R	14D, 10R	Bob Bartlett (D)
1952	Ernest Gruening (D)	9D, 7R	14D, 10R	Bob Bartlett (D)
1953	B. Frank Heintzleman (R)	11R, 5D	19R, 5D	Bob Bartlett (D)
1954	B. Frank Heintzleman (R)	11R, 5D	19R, 5D	Bob Bartlett (D)
1955	B. Frank Heintzleman (R)	12D, 4R	21D, 3R	Bob Bartlett (D)
1956	B. Frank Heintzleman (R)	12D, 4R	21D, 3R	Bob Bartlett (D)
1957	Waino Hendrickson (acting) (R)	11D, 5R	21D, 3R	Bob Bartlett (D)
1957	Mike Stepovich (R)	11D, 5R	21D, 3R	Bob Bartlett (D)
1958	Mike Stepovich (R)	11D, 5R	21D, 3R	Bob Bartlett (D)
1958	Waino Hendrickson (acting) (R)	11D, 5R	21D, 3R	Bob Bartlett (D)

== 1959–present ==
Year	Executive offices		State Legislature		United States Congress			Electoral votes
Year	Governor	Lt. Governor	Senate	House	U.S. Senate (Class II)	U.S. Senate (Class III)	House	Electoral votes
1959	William A. Egan (D)	Hugh Wade (D)	18D, 2R	34D, 5R, 1I	Bob Bartlett (D)	Ernest Gruening (D)	Ralph Rivers (D) (Note: Resigned following electoral defeat.)	
1960	William A. Egan (D)	Hugh Wade (D)	18D, 2R	34D, 5R, 1I	Bob Bartlett (D)	Ernest Gruening (D)	Ralph Rivers (D)	Richard Nixon/ Henry Cabot Lodge Jr. (R) ✗
1961	William A. Egan (D)	Hugh Wade (D)	13D, 7R	20D, 19R, 1I	Bob Bartlett (D)	Ernest Gruening (D)	Ralph Rivers (D)	Richard Nixon/ Henry Cabot Lodge Jr. (R) ✗
1962	William A. Egan (D)	Hugh Wade (D)	13D, 7R	20D, 19R, 1I	Bob Bartlett (D)	Ernest Gruening (D)	Ralph Rivers (D)	Richard Nixon/ Henry Cabot Lodge Jr. (R) ✗
1963	William A. Egan (D)	Hugh Wade (D)	15D, 5R	20D, 20R (Note: The House elected a Republican as Speaker.)	Bob Bartlett (D)	Ernest Gruening (D)	Ralph Rivers (D)	Richard Nixon/ Henry Cabot Lodge Jr. (R) ✗
1964	William A. Egan (D)	Hugh Wade (D)	15D, 5R	20D, 20R	Bob Bartlett (D)	Ernest Gruening (D)	Ralph Rivers (D)	Lyndon B. Johnson/ Hubert Humphrey (D) ✓
1965	William A. Egan (D)	Hugh Wade (D)	17D, 3R	30D, 10R	Bob Bartlett (D)	Ernest Gruening (D)	Ralph Rivers (D)	Lyndon B. Johnson/ Hubert Humphrey (D) ✓
1966	William A. Egan (D)	Hugh Wade (D)	17D, 3R	30D, 10R	Bob Bartlett (D)	Ernest Gruening (D)	Ralph Rivers (D)	Lyndon B. Johnson/ Hubert Humphrey (D) ✓
1967	Wally Hickel (R) (Note: Resigned to become United States Secretary of the Interior.)	Keith Harvey Miller (R)	14R, 6D	26R, 14D	Bob Bartlett (D)	Ernest Gruening (D)	Howard Pollock (R)	Lyndon B. Johnson/ Hubert Humphrey (D) ✓
1968	Wally Hickel (R)	Keith Harvey Miller (R)	14R, 6D	26R, 14D	Bob Bartlett (D)	Ernest Gruening (D)	Howard Pollock (R)	Richard Nixon/ Spiro Agnew (R) ✓
1968	Wally Hickel (R)	Keith Harvey Miller (R)	14R, 6D	26R, 14D	Ted Stevens (R) (Note: Initially elected in a special election.)	Ernest Gruening (D)	Howard Pollock (R)	Richard Nixon/ Spiro Agnew (R) ✓
1969	Wally Hickel (R)	Keith Harvey Miller (R)	11R, 9D	22D, 18R	Ted Stevens (R)	Mike Gravel (D)	Howard Pollock (R)	Richard Nixon/ Spiro Agnew (R) ✓
1969	Keith Harvey Miller (R) (Note: Ascended to office following the resignation of predecessor.)	Robert W. Ward (R)	11R, 9D	22D, 18R	Ted Stevens (R)	Mike Gravel (D)	Howard Pollock (R)	Richard Nixon/ Spiro Agnew (R) ✓
1970	Keith Harvey Miller (R)	Robert W. Ward (R)	11R, 9D	22D, 18R	Ted Stevens (R)	Mike Gravel (D)	Howard Pollock (R)	Richard Nixon/ Spiro Agnew (R) ✓
1971	William A. Egan (D)	H. A. Boucher (D)	10D, 10R (Note: The Senate elected a Republican as President.)	31D, 9R	Ted Stevens (R)	Mike Gravel (D)	Nick Begich (D)	Richard Nixon/ Spiro Agnew (R) ✓
1972	William A. Egan (D)	H. A. Boucher (D)	10D, 10R	31D, 9R	Ted Stevens (R)	Mike Gravel (D)	Nick Begich (D)	Richard Nixon/ Spiro Agnew (R) ✓
1973	William A. Egan (D)	H. A. Boucher (D)	11R, 9D	20D, 19R, 1NP (Note: Led by a coalition with a Republican House speaker, Tom Fink.) (Note: The "no party" member, Frank R. Ferguson, was elected as a write-in after losing the Democratic primary as an incumbent. He served in the previous and following legislatures as a Democrat.)	Ted Stevens (R)	Mike Gravel (D)	Don Young (R) (Note: Initially elected in a special election.)	Richard Nixon/ Spiro Agnew (R) ✓
1974	William A. Egan (D)	H. A. Boucher (D)	11R, 9D	20D, 19R, 1NP	Ted Stevens (R)	Mike Gravel (D)	Don Young (R)	Richard Nixon/ Spiro Agnew (R) ✓
1975	Jay Hammond (R)	Lowell Thomas Jr. (R)	13D, 7R	30D, 9R, 1I	Ted Stevens (R)	Mike Gravel (D)	Don Young (R)	Richard Nixon/ Spiro Agnew (R) ✓
1976	Jay Hammond (R)	Lowell Thomas Jr. (R)	13D, 7R	30D, 9R, 1I	Ted Stevens (R)	Mike Gravel (D)	Don Young (R)	Gerald Ford/ Bob Dole (R) ✗
1977	Jay Hammond (R)	Lowell Thomas Jr. (R)	12D, 8R	25D, 15R	Ted Stevens (R)	Mike Gravel (D)	Don Young (R)	Gerald Ford/ Bob Dole (R) ✗
1978	Jay Hammond (R)	Lowell Thomas Jr. (R)	12D, 8R	25D, 15R	Ted Stevens (R)	Mike Gravel (D)	Don Young (R)	Gerald Ford/ Bob Dole (R) ✗
1979	Jay Hammond (R)	Terry Miller (R)	11R, 9D	25D, 14R, 1L	Ted Stevens (R)	Mike Gravel (D)	Don Young (R)	Gerald Ford/ Bob Dole (R) ✗
1980	Jay Hammond (R)	Terry Miller (R)	11R, 9D	25D, 14R, 1L	Ted Stevens (R)	Mike Gravel (D)	Don Young (R)	Ronald Reagan/ George H. W. Bush (R) ✓
1981	Jay Hammond (R)	Terry Miller (R)	10D, 10R (Note: The Senate elected a Democrat as president.)	22D, 16R, 2L	Ted Stevens (R)	Frank Murkowski (R) (Note: Resigned December 2, 2002 to take office as Governor of Alaska.)	Don Young (R)	Ronald Reagan/ George H. W. Bush (R) ✓
1981	Jay Hammond (R)	Terry Miller (R)	10D, 10R	22D, 16R, 2L (Note: The Democratic Speaker of the House, Jim Duncan, was voted out on June 16, 1981, eight days before the end of session. He was replaced by a tri-partisan coalition of Republicans, native Bush Democrats, and Libertarians (the Libertarians later dropped out) led by Republican Joe Hayes, which remained through the end of this Legislature. The overall partisan composition of the House remained unchanged, and the coalition led by Hayes was preserved in a slightly different form in the next Legislature as well.)	Ted Stevens (R)	Frank Murkowski (R)	Don Young (R)	Ronald Reagan/ George H. W. Bush (R) ✓
1982	Jay Hammond (R)	Terry Miller (R)	10D, 10R	22D, 16R, 2L	Ted Stevens (R)	Frank Murkowski (R)	Don Young (R)	Ronald Reagan/ George H. W. Bush (R) ✓
1983	Bill Sheffield (D)	Steve McAlpine (D)	11R, 9D	20D, 20R	Ted Stevens (R)	Frank Murkowski (R)	Don Young (R)	Ronald Reagan/ George H. W. Bush (R) ✓
1984	Bill Sheffield (D)	Steve McAlpine (D)	11R, 9D	20D, 20R	Ted Stevens (R)	Frank Murkowski (R)	Don Young (R)	Ronald Reagan/ George H. W. Bush (R) ✓
1985	Bill Sheffield (D)	Steve McAlpine (D)	11R, 9D	21D, 18R, 1L	Ted Stevens (R)	Frank Murkowski (R)	Don Young (R)	Ronald Reagan/ George H. W. Bush (R) ✓
1986	Bill Sheffield (D)	Steve McAlpine (D)	11R, 9D	21D, 18R, 1L	Ted Stevens (R)	Frank Murkowski (R)	Don Young (R)	Ronald Reagan/ George H. W. Bush (R) ✓
1987	Steve Cowper (D)	Steve McAlpine (D)	12R, 8D	24D, 16R	Ted Stevens (R)	Frank Murkowski (R)	Don Young (R)	Ronald Reagan/ George H. W. Bush (R) ✓
1988	Steve Cowper (D)	Steve McAlpine (D)	12R, 8D	24D, 16R	Ted Stevens (R)	Frank Murkowski (R)	Don Young (R)	George H. W. Bush/ Dan Quayle (R) ✓
1989	Steve Cowper (D)	Steve McAlpine (D)	12R, 8D	24D, 16R	Ted Stevens (R)	Frank Murkowski (R)	Don Young (R)	George H. W. Bush/ Dan Quayle (R) ✓
1990	Steve Cowper (D)	Steve McAlpine (D)	12R, 8D	24D, 16R	Ted Stevens (R)	Frank Murkowski (R)	Don Young (R)	George H. W. Bush/ Dan Quayle (R) ✓
1991	Wally Hickel (AKIP)	Jack Coghill (AKIP)	10D, 10R	23D, 17R	Ted Stevens (R)	Frank Murkowski (R)	Don Young (R)	George H. W. Bush/ Dan Quayle (R) ✓
1992	Wally Hickel (AKIP)	Jack Coghill (AKIP)	10D, 10R	23D, 17R	Ted Stevens (R)	Frank Murkowski (R)	Don Young (R)	George H. W. Bush/ Dan Quayle (R) ✗
1993	Wally Hickel (AKIP)	Jack Coghill (AKIP)	10R, 9D, 1ID	20D, 18R, 1AKIP, 1I (Note: Led by a coalition with a Republican House Speaker, Ramona L. Barnes.)	Ted Stevens (R)	Frank Murkowski (R)	Don Young (R)	George H. W. Bush/ Dan Quayle (R) ✗
1994	Wally Hickel (AKIP)	Jack Coghill (AKIP)	10R, 9D, 1ID	20D, 18R, 1AKIP, 1I	Ted Stevens (R)	Frank Murkowski (R)	Don Young (R)	George H. W. Bush/ Dan Quayle (R) ✗
1994	Wally Hickel (R)	Jack Coghill (AKIP)	10R, 9D, 1ID	21D, 18R, 1I (Note: The representative elected under the AKIP banner, Carl E. Moses, switched his party affiliation to Democratic on May 24, 1994, shortly after Hickel's party switch, but the coalition that elected the Republican Speaker stayed in place.)	Ted Stevens (R)	Frank Murkowski (R)	Don Young (R)	George H. W. Bush/ Dan Quayle (R) ✗
1995	Tony Knowles (D)	Fran Ulmer (D)	12R, 7D, 1ID	22R, 17D, 1I	Ted Stevens (R)	Frank Murkowski (R)	Don Young (R)	George H. W. Bush/ Dan Quayle (R) ✗
1996	Tony Knowles (D)	Fran Ulmer (D)	12R, 7D, 1ID	22R, 17D, 1I	Ted Stevens (R)	Frank Murkowski (R)	Don Young (R)	Bob Dole/ Jack Kemp (R) ✗
1997	Tony Knowles (D)	Fran Ulmer (D)	14R, 6D	25R, 15D	Ted Stevens (R)	Frank Murkowski (R)	Don Young (R)	Bob Dole/ Jack Kemp (R) ✗
1998	Tony Knowles (D)	Fran Ulmer (D)	14R, 6D	25R, 15D	Ted Stevens (R)	Frank Murkowski (R)	Don Young (R)	Bob Dole/ Jack Kemp (R) ✗
1999	Tony Knowles (D)	Fran Ulmer (D)	15R, 5D	26R, 14D	Ted Stevens (R)	Frank Murkowski (R)	Don Young (R)	Bob Dole/ Jack Kemp (R) ✗
2000	Tony Knowles (D)	Fran Ulmer (D)	15R, 5D	26R, 14D	Ted Stevens (R)	Frank Murkowski (R)	Don Young (R)	George W. Bush/ Dick Cheney (R) ✓
2001	Tony Knowles (D)	Fran Ulmer (D)	14R, 6D	27R, 13D	Ted Stevens (R)	Frank Murkowski (R)	Don Young (R)	George W. Bush/ Dick Cheney (R) ✓
2002	Tony Knowles (D)	Fran Ulmer (D)	14R, 6D	27R, 13D	Ted Stevens (R)	Frank Murkowski (R)	Don Young (R)	George W. Bush/ Dick Cheney (R) ✓
2003	Frank Murkowski (R)	Loren Leman (R)	12R, 8D (Note: One senator was elected under the Republican Moderate Party banner, but switched his party affiliation to Republican before the actual start of his term.)	27R, 13D	Ted Stevens (R)	Lisa Murkowski (R) (Note: Appointed to fill a vacancy.)	Don Young (R)	George W. Bush/ Dick Cheney (R) ✓
2004	Frank Murkowski (R)	Loren Leman (R)	12R, 8D	27R, 13D	Ted Stevens (R)	Lisa Murkowski (R)	Don Young (R)	George W. Bush/ Dick Cheney (R) ✓
2005	Frank Murkowski (R)	Loren Leman (R)	12R, 8D	26R, 14D	Ted Stevens (R)	Lisa Murkowski (R)	Don Young (R)	George W. Bush/ Dick Cheney (R) ✓
2006	Frank Murkowski (R)	Loren Leman (R)	12R, 8D	26R, 14D	Ted Stevens (R)	Lisa Murkowski (R)	Don Young (R)	George W. Bush/ Dick Cheney (R) ✓
2007	Sarah Palin (R) (Note: Resigned.)	Sean Parnell (R)	11R, 9D (Note: A coalition of six Republicans and the Senate's nine Democrats made up the majority caucus.)	23R, 17D	Ted Stevens (R)	Lisa Murkowski (R)	Don Young (R)	George W. Bush/ Dick Cheney (R) ✓
2008	Sarah Palin (R)	Sean Parnell (R)	11R, 9D	23R, 17D	Ted Stevens (R)	Lisa Murkowski (R)	Don Young (R)	John McCain/ Sarah Palin (R) ✗
2009	Sean Parnell (R)	Craig Campbell (R)	10R, 10D (Note: From 2009-2011, six Republicans joined the ten Democrats to form a governing coalition. From 2011-2013, five Republicans governed with the ten Democrats.)	22R, 18D	Mark Begich (D)	Lisa Murkowski (R)	Don Young (R)	John McCain/ Sarah Palin (R) ✗
2010	Sean Parnell (R)	Craig Campbell (R)	10R, 10D	22R, 18D	Mark Begich (D)	Lisa Murkowski (R)	Don Young (R)	John McCain/ Sarah Palin (R) ✗
2011	Sean Parnell (R)	Mead Treadwell (R)	10R, 10D	24R, 16D (Note: Four Democrats caucused with the Republican majority.)	Mark Begich (D)	Lisa Murkowski (R)	Don Young (R)	John McCain/ Sarah Palin (R) ✗
2012	Sean Parnell (R)	Mead Treadwell (R)	10R, 10D	24R, 16D	Mark Begich (D)	Lisa Murkowski (R)	Don Young (R)	Mitt Romney/ Paul Ryan (R) ✗
2013	Sean Parnell (R)	Mead Treadwell (R)	13R, 7D (Note: Two Democrats caucused with the Republican majority.)	26R, 14D	Mark Begich (D)	Lisa Murkowski (R)	Don Young (R)	Mitt Romney/ Paul Ryan (R) ✗
2014	Sean Parnell (R)	Mead Treadwell (R)	13R, 7D	26R, 14D	Mark Begich (D)	Lisa Murkowski (R)	Don Young (R)	Mitt Romney/ Paul Ryan (R) ✗
2015	Bill Walker (I)	Byron Mallott (D)	14R, 6D (Note: One Democrat caucused with the Republican majority.)	23R, 16D, 1I	Dan Sullivan (R)	Lisa Murkowski (R)	Don Young (R)	Mitt Romney/ Paul Ryan (R) ✗
2016	Bill Walker (I)	Byron Mallott (D)	14R, 6D	23R, 16D, 1I	Dan Sullivan (R)	Lisa Murkowski (R)	Don Young (R)	Donald Trump/ Mike Pence (R) ✓
2017	Bill Walker (I)	Byron Mallott (D)	14R, 6D	21R, 17D, 2I (Note: Three Republicans and both Independents caucused with the Democrats to form a governing coalition.)	Dan Sullivan (R)	Lisa Murkowski (R)	Don Young (R)	Donald Trump/ Mike Pence (R) ✓
2018	Bill Walker (I)	Valerie Davidson (D)	14R, 6D	21R, 17D, 2I	Dan Sullivan (R)	Lisa Murkowski (R)	Don Young (R)	Donald Trump/ Mike Pence (R) ✓
2019	Mike Dunleavy (R)	Kevin Meyer (R)	13R, 7D	23R, 15D, 2I (Note: Six Republicans and both Independents caucused with the Democrats to form a governing coalition.)	Dan Sullivan (R)	Lisa Murkowski (R)	Don Young (R)	Donald Trump/ Mike Pence (R) ✓
2020	Mike Dunleavy (R)	Kevin Meyer (R)	13R, 7D	23R, 15D, 2I	Dan Sullivan (R)	Lisa Murkowski (R)	Don Young (R)	Donald Trump/ Mike Pence (R) ✗
2021	Mike Dunleavy (R)	Kevin Meyer (R)	13R, 7D	21R, 15D, 4I (Note: Two Republicans and all Independents caucused with all Democrats to form a governing coalition. Two Republicans are not members of a caucus.)	Dan Sullivan (R)	Lisa Murkowski (R)	Don Young (R)	Donald Trump/ Mike Pence (R) ✗
2022	Mike Dunleavy (R)	Kevin Meyer (R)	13R, 7D	21R, 15D, 4I	Dan Sullivan (R)	Lisa Murkowski (R)	Mary Peltola (D) (Note: Seat was vacant from March 18–September 13, 2022)	Donald Trump/ Mike Pence (R) ✗
2023	Mike Dunleavy (R)	Nancy Dahlstrom (R)	11R, 9D (Note: From 2023–2025, eight Republicans and all nine Democrats caucused together to form the governing coalition. From 2025–present, five Republicans joined all nine Democrats to form the governing coalition.)	21R, 13D, 6I (Note: Nineteen Republicans, two Democrats, and two Independents caucused together to form the governing coalition.)	Dan Sullivan (R)	Lisa Murkowski (R)	Mary Peltola (D)	Donald Trump/ Mike Pence (R) ✗
2024	Mike Dunleavy (R)	Nancy Dahlstrom (R)	11R, 9D	22R, 13D, 5I (Note: Republican Thomas Baker was appointed to fill the seat of independent Josiah Patkotak, who resigned.)	Dan Sullivan (R)	Lisa Murkowski (R)	Mary Peltola (D)	Donald Trump/ JD Vance (R) ✓
2025	Mike Dunleavy (R)	Nancy Dahlstrom (R)	11R, 9D	21R, 14D, 5I (Note: All fourteen Democrats, all five Independents and two Republicans caucused together to form the governing coalition.)	Dan Sullivan (R)	Lisa Murkowski (R)	Nick Begich III (R)	Donald Trump/ JD Vance (R) ✓
2026	Mike Dunleavy (R)	Nancy Dahlstrom (R)	11R, 9D	21R, 14D, 5I	Dan Sullivan (R)	Lisa Murkowski (R)	Nick Begich III (R)	Donald Trump/ JD Vance (R) ✓
2027	Jonathan Kreiss-Tomkins (D)	Zac Johnson (I)	11R, 8D, 1I (Note: All Democrats, the Independent, and two Republicans formed the majority caucus.)	17D, 16R, 7I	Mary Peltola (D)	Lisa Murkowski (R)	Nick Begich III (R)	Donald Trump/ JD Vance (R) ✓

== Key ==
Key to party colors and abbreviations for members of the U.S. Congress and other politicians or officials
Alaskan Independence (AKIP) Know Nothing (KN) American Labor (AL) Anti-Jacksonian (Anti-J); National Republican (NR) Anti-Administration (AA) Anti-Masonic (Anti-M) Conservative (Con) Covenant (Cov)	Democratic (D) Democratic–Farmer–Labor (DFL) Democratic–NPL (D-NPL) Dixiecrat (Dix), States' Rights (SR) Democratic-Republican (DR) Farmer–Labor (FL) Federalist (F); Pro-Administration (PA)	Free Soil (FS) Fusion (Fus) Greenback (GB) Independence (IPM) Jacksonian (J) Liberal (Lib) Libertarian (L) National Union (NU)	Nonpartisan League (NPL) Nullifier (N) Opposition Northern (O); Opposition Southern (O) Populist (Pop) Progressive (Prog) Prohibition (Proh) Readjuster (Rea)	Republican (R) Silver (Sv) Silver Republican (SvR) Socialist (Soc) Union (U) Unconditional Union (UU) Vermont Progressive (VP) Whig (W)	Independent (I) Nonpartisan (NP)

== See also ==
- Law and government in Alaska
- Elections in Alaska
- Government of Alaska
- Politics of Alaska
