= Alaska's congressional delegations =

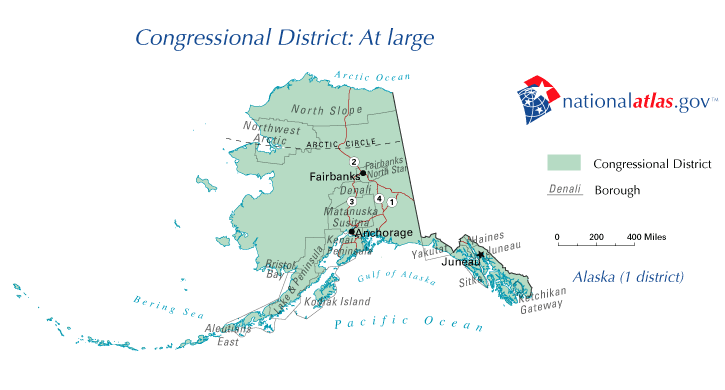
Map of Alaska's single congressional district.

Since Alaska became a U.S. state in 1959, it has sent congressional delegations to the United States Senate and United States House of Representatives. Each state elects two senators to serve for six years, and member(s) of the House to two-year terms. Before becoming a state, the Territory of Alaska elected a non-voting delegate at-large to Congress from 1906 to 1959.

These are tables of congressional delegations from Alaska to the United States Senate and the United States House of Representatives.

== Current delegation ==
Current U.S. senators from Alaska
Alaska CPVI (2025): R+6	Class II senator	Class III senator
Alaska CPVI (2025): R+6	Dan Sullivan (Junior senator) (Anchorage)	Lisa Murkowski (Senior senator) (Girdwood)
Party	Republican	Republican
Incumbent since	January 3, 2015	December 20, 2002

Alaska's current congressional delegation in the 119th Congress consists of its two senators, who are both Republicans and its sole representative, who is a Republican. The current dean of the Alaska delegation is Senator Lisa Murkowski having served in the Senate since 2002. Lisa Murkowski is the first elected senator born in Alaska.

Current U.S. representatives from Alaska
District	Member (Residence)	Party	Incumbent since	CPVI (2025)	District map
At-large	Nick Begich III (Chugiak)	Republican	January 3, 2025	R+6	

== United States Senate ==
Each state elects two senators by statewide popular vote every six years. The terms of the two senators are staggered so that they are not elected in the same year, meaning that each seat also has a class determining the years in which the seat will be up for election. Alaska's senators are elected in classes 2 and 3.

There have been eight senators from Alaska, of whom four have been Democrats and four have been Republicans. William Egan and Ernest Gruening were elected to the Senate on October 6, 1956 for the 84th Congress but did not take the oath of office and were not accorded senatorial privileges, since Alaska was not yet a state. Alaska's current senators, both Republicans, are Dan Sullivan, in office since 2015, and Lisa Murkowski, in office since 2002.

Class II senator	Congress	Class III senator
Bob Bartlett (D) (Note: Died in office.)	86th (1959–1961)	Ernest Gruening (D)
Bob Bartlett (D)	87th (1961–1963)	Ernest Gruening (D)
Bob Bartlett (D)	88th (1963–1965)	Ernest Gruening (D)
Bob Bartlett (D)	89th (1965–1967)	Ernest Gruening (D)
Bob Bartlett (D)	90th (1967–1969)	Ernest Gruening (D)
Ted Stevens (R)	90th (1967–1969)	Ernest Gruening (D)
Ted Stevens (R)	91st (1969–1971)	Mike Gravel (D)
Ted Stevens (R)	92nd (1971–1973)	Mike Gravel (D)
Ted Stevens (R)	93rd (1973–1975)	Mike Gravel (D)
Ted Stevens (R)	94th (1975–1977)	Mike Gravel (D)
Ted Stevens (R)	95th (1977–1979)	Mike Gravel (D)
Ted Stevens (R)	96th (1979–1981)	Mike Gravel (D)
Ted Stevens (R)	97th (1981–1983)	Frank Murkowski (R)
Ted Stevens (R)	98th (1983–1985)	Frank Murkowski (R)
Ted Stevens (R)	99th (1985–1987)	Frank Murkowski (R)
Ted Stevens (R)	100th (1987–1989)	Frank Murkowski (R)
Ted Stevens (R)	101st (1989–1991)	Frank Murkowski (R)
Ted Stevens (R)	102nd (1991–1993)	Frank Murkowski (R)
Ted Stevens (R)	103rd (1993–1995)	Frank Murkowski (R)
Ted Stevens (R)	104th (1995–1997)	Frank Murkowski (R)
Ted Stevens (R)	105th (1997–1999)	Frank Murkowski (R)
Ted Stevens (R)	106th (1999–2001)	Frank Murkowski (R)
Ted Stevens (R)	107th (2001–2003)	Frank Murkowski (R)
Ted Stevens (R)	107th (2001–2003)	Lisa Murkowski (R)
Ted Stevens (R)	108th (2003–2005)	Lisa Murkowski (R)
Ted Stevens (R)	109th (2005–2007)	Lisa Murkowski (R)
Ted Stevens (R)	110th (2007–2009)	Lisa Murkowski (R)
Mark Begich (D)	111th (2009–2011)	Lisa Murkowski (R)
Mark Begich (D)	112th (2011–2013)	Lisa Murkowski (R)
Mark Begich (D)	113th (2013–2015)	Lisa Murkowski (R)
Dan Sullivan (R)	114th (2015–2017)	Lisa Murkowski (R)
Dan Sullivan (R)	115th (2017–2019)	Lisa Murkowski (R)
Dan Sullivan (R)	116th (2019–2021)	Lisa Murkowski (R)
Dan Sullivan (R)	117th (2021–2023)	Lisa Murkowski (R)
Dan Sullivan (R)	118th (2023–2025)	Lisa Murkowski (R)
Dan Sullivan (R)	119th (2025–2027)	Lisa Murkowski (R)
Mary Peltola (D)	120th (2027–2029)	Lisa Murkowski (R)

== United States House of Representatives ==
=== 1906–1959: 1 non-voting delegate ===
Starting on August 14, 1906, Alaska sent a non-voting delegate to the House. From May 17, 1884 to August 24, 1912, Alaska was designated as the District of Alaska. From then to January 3, 1959, it was the Alaska Territory.

Congress	Delegate from territorial district
59th (1905–1907)	Frank Hinman Waskey (D)
60th (1907–1909)	Thomas Cale (I)
61st (1909–1911)	James Wickersham (R)
62nd (1911–1913)	James Wickersham (R)
63rd (1913–1915)	James Wickersham (R)
64th (1915–1917)	James Wickersham (R)
65th (1917–1919)	Charles A. Sulzer (D)
65th (1917–1919)	James Wickersham (Note: Successfully contested the election of George Barnes Grigsby, the representative who replaced Charles A. Sulzer.) (R)
66th (1919–1921)	Charles A. Sulzer (D)
66th (1919–1921)	George B. Grigsby (D)
66th (1919–1921)	James Wickersham (Note: Contested the election of Charles August Sulzer, and when Sulzer died, continued the contest against his successor George Barnes Grigsby and won.) (R)
67th (1921–1923)	Daniel Sutherland (R)
68th (1923–1925)	Daniel Sutherland (R)
69th (1925–1927)	Daniel Sutherland (R)
70th (1927–1929)	Daniel Sutherland (R)
71st (1929–1931)	Daniel Sutherland (R)
72nd (1931–1933)	James Wickersham (R)
73rd (1933–1935)	Anthony Dimond (D)
74th (1935–1937)	Anthony Dimond (D)
75th (1937–1939)	Anthony Dimond (D)
76th (1939–1941)	Anthony Dimond (D)
77th (1941–1943)	Anthony Dimond (D)
78th (1943–1945)	Anthony Dimond (D)
79th (1945–1947)	Bob Bartlett (D)
80th (1947–1949)	Bob Bartlett (D)
81st (1949–1951)	Bob Bartlett (D)
82nd (1951–1953)	Bob Bartlett (D)
83rd (1953–1955)	Bob Bartlett (D)
84th (1955–1957)	Bob Bartlett (D)
85th (1957–1959)	Bob Bartlett (D)

=== 1959–present: 1 seat ===
Since statehood on January 3, 1959, Alaska has had one seat in the House.

Congress	At-large district
86th (1959–1961)	Ralph Rivers (D)
87th (1961–1963)	Ralph Rivers (D)
88th (1963–1965)	Ralph Rivers (D)
89th (1965–1967)	Ralph Rivers (D)
90th (1967–1969)	Howard Pollock (R)
91st (1969–1971)	Howard Pollock (R)
92nd (1971–1973)	Nick Begich Sr. (Note: Disappeared October 16, 1972, re-elected November 7, declared dead December 29.) (D)
92nd (1971–1973)	Don Young (Note: Elected to fill the vacancy caused by the previous representative, Nick Begich Sr. being re-elected (presumably posthumously) to the next term.) (R)
93rd (1973–1975)	Don Young (R)
94th (1975–1977)	Don Young (R)
95th (1977–1979)	Don Young (R)
96th (1979–1981)	Don Young (R)
97th (1981–1983)	Don Young (R)
98th (1983–1985)	Don Young (R)
99th (1985–1987)	Don Young (R)
100th (1987–1989)	Don Young (R)
101st (1989–1991)	Don Young (R)
102nd (1991–1993)	Don Young (R)
103rd (1993–1995)	Don Young (R)
104th (1995–1997)	Don Young (R)
105th (1997–1999)	Don Young (R)
106th (1999–2001)	Don Young (R)
107th (2001–2003)	Don Young (R)
108th (2003–2005)	Don Young (R)
109th (2005–2007)	Don Young (R)
110th (2007–2009)	Don Young (R)
111th (2009–2011)	Don Young (R)
112th (2011–2013)	Don Young (R)
113th (2013–2015)	Don Young (R)
114th (2015–2017)	Don Young (R)
115th (2017–2019)	Don Young (R)
116th (2019–2021)	Don Young (R)
117th (2021–2023)	Don Young (R)
117th (2021–2023)	Mary Peltola (Note: Elected to fill the vacancy caused by the previous representative, Don Young dying in office.) (D)
118th (2023–2025)	Mary Peltola (D)
119th (2025–2027)	Nick Begich III (R)
120th (2027–2029)	Nick Begich III (R)

== Key ==
Democratic (D)
Republican (R)
Independent (I)

== See also ==
- List of United States congressional districts
- Alaska's congressional districts
- Political party strength in Alaska
