= 1919 United States House of Representatives elections =

There were four special elections to the United States House of Representatives in 1919, during the 65th United States Congress and 66th United States Congress.

== 65th United States Congress ==
District	Incumbent			This race	
District	Member	Party	First elected	Results	Candidates
Virginia 6	Carter Glass	Democratic	1902 (special)	Incumbent resigned December 6, 1918, to become U.S. Secretary of the Treasury. New member elected February 25, 1919. Democratic hold. Winner also elected to the next term; see below.	▌ ✓ James P. Woods (Democratic) 88.20%; ▌F. S. Layne (Independent) 11.80%

== 66th United States Congress ==
District	Incumbent			This race	
District	Member / Delegate	Party	First elected	Results	Candidates
Virginia 6	Carter Glass	Democratic	1902 (special)	Incumbent resigned December 6, 1918, to become U.S. Secretary of the Treasury. New member elected February 25, 1919. Democratic hold. Winner also elected to finish the current term; see above.	▌ ✓ James P. Woods (Democratic) 88.24%; ▌F. S. Layne (Independent) 11.76%
Pennsylvania 22	Edward E. Robbins	Republican	1916	Incumbent member-elect died January 25, 1919. New member elected March 4, 1919. Democratic gain.	▌ ✓ John H. Wilson (Democratic) 51.07%; ▌John M. Jamison (Republican) 48.93%
Texas 12	Vacant			Incumbent James Clifton Wilson (D) did not take his seat. New member elected April 19, 1919. Democratic hold.	▌ ✓ Fritz G. Lanham (Democratic) 99.45%; Scattering 0.55%
Virginia 8	Charles C. Carlin	Democratic	1907 (special)	Incumbent resigned to manage the presidential campaign of A. Mitchell Palmer. New member elected April 27, 1919. Democratic hold.	▌ ✓ R. Walton Moore (Democratic) 78.58%; ▌F. M. Brooks (Republican) 16.18%; ▌C. H. Shifman (Unknown) 5.24%
Alaska Territory at-large	Charles A. Sulzer	Democratic	1916	Incumbent died April 28, 1919, during an election recount. New member elected June 5, 1919. Democratic hold. Winner would later be unseated by the contested election.	▌ ✓ George B. Grigsby (Democratic); ▌James Wickersham (Republican)
Alabama 7	John L. Burnett	Democratic	1898	Incumbent died May 13, 1919. New member elected September 30, 1919. Democratic hold.	▌ ✓ Lilius B. Rainey (Democratic) 51.37%; ▌Charles B. Kennamer (Republican) 48.63%
Oklahoma 5	Joseph B. Thompson	Democratic	1912	Incumbent died September 18, 1919. New member elected November 8, 1919. Republican gain.	▌ ✓ John W. Harreld (Republican) 51.3%; ▌Claude Weaver (Democratic) 48.2%; ▌Alonzo Turner (Independent) 0.4%
North Carolina 9	Edwin Y. Webb	Democratic	1902	Incumbent resigned November 10, 1919. New member elected December 16, 1919. Democratic hold.	▌ ✓ Clyde R. Hoey (Democratic) 51.85%; ▌ John M. Morehead 48.15%
Wisconsin 5	Victor L. Berger	Socialist	1910; 1912 (lost); 1918	Incumbent declared disqualified and unseated by Congress November 10, 1919. Incumbent re-elected December 19, 1919. Congress refused to seat winner. Seat remained vacant until the next general election.	▌ ✓ Victor L. Berger (Socialist) 55.4%; ▌ Henry H. Bodenstab (Republican) 44.6%
