= O. P. Hubbard =

American politician

Oliver Perry Hubbard
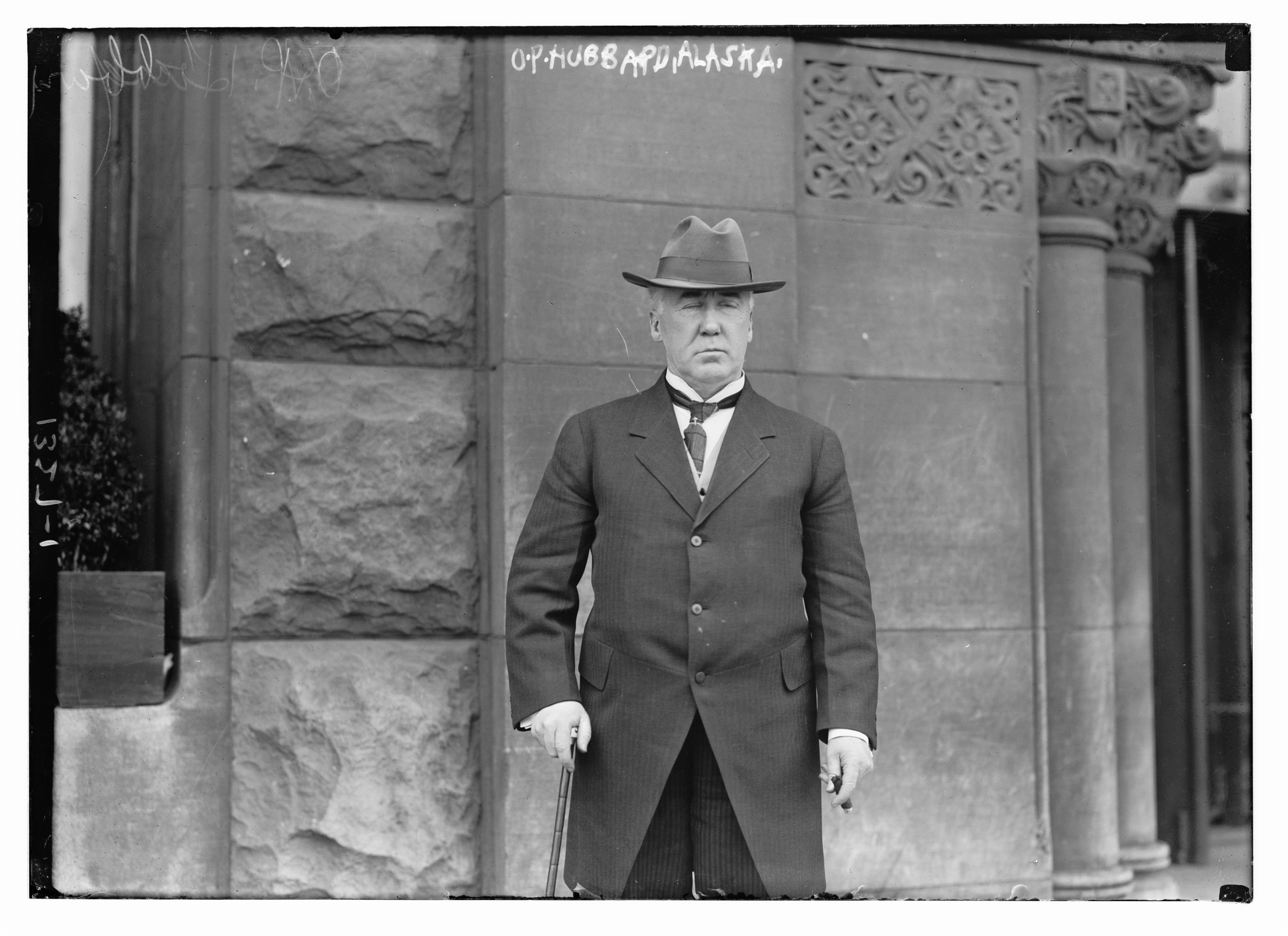

President of the Alaska Territorial Senate
- In office 1917–1919
- Preceded by: Daniel Sutherland
- Succeeded by: James Frawley

Member of the Alaska Senate from the 3rd district
- In office March 1, 1915 – March 3, 1919 Serving with B.F. Millard (1915-1917); John Ronan (1917-1919)
- Preceded by: L.V. Ray
- Succeeded by: Thomas C. Price

Personal details
- Born: November 7, 1856 Wabash, Indiana, U.S.
- Died: October 4, 1948 (aged 91) West Hartford, Connecticut, U.S.
- Party: Progressive; Republican

Oliver Perry Hubbard (November 7, 1856 – October 4, 1948) was a Progressive member of the Alaska Senate from 1915 to 1919. He represented the 3rd district and served as President of the Alaska Senate during the 3rd Territorial Legislature.

Hubbard attended college at Butler University and earned his law degree from Georgetown University. Professionally, he worked as a clerk for the Indiana General Assembly and an official reporter for the Superior Court in Henry County, Indiana. He then took work with the United States Department of Justice as private secretary to William H. H. Miller and an assistant attorney in the Indian Depredation Claims Division, before taking up private practice in Chicago.

He became a railroad promoter in the late 1890s eventually practicing law in Nome, Alaska, for a time. Hubbard was an advocate for statehood and proposed a bill calling on Congress to grant such status to the Territory of Alaska. While President of the Senate, he opted to place a referendum on the ballot to establish an eight-hour work day in Alaska. He served on the Alaska Territorial Board of Education. By 1920, Hubbard had become a Republican.

Hubbard died on October 4, 1948, at his home in West Hartford, Connecticut.
