= Hetta Inlet =

Alaskan bay

Coordinates: 55.13°N 132.64°W

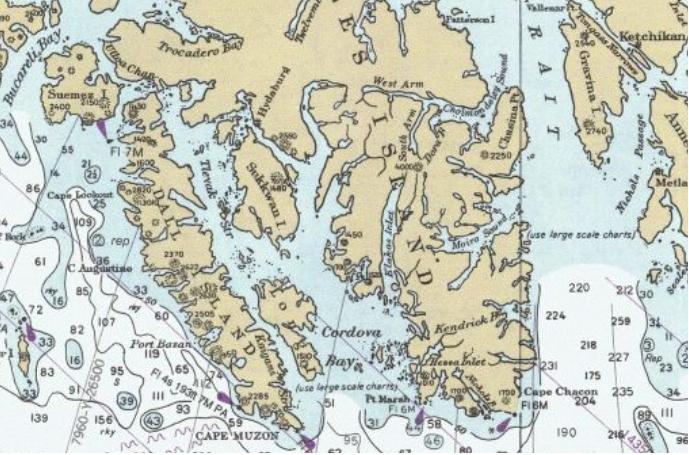
Regional map, including Hetta Inlet

Hetta Inlet is a deep embayment in the southwestern coast of Prince of Wales Island in the U.S. state of Alaska. It connects with the Pacific Ocean through Cordova Bay. The head of the inlet is separated by a 200 feet (61 m) divide from the West Arm of Cholmondeley Sound. The shores are abrupt from the water's edge, and the channels and inlets are deep. The precipitation is probably a little greater than at Ketchikan, and the mean annual temperature is slightly higher. The white crystalline limestone of the Wales series, striking nearly north and south, is the predominant country rock of Hetta Inlet. In it are intruded many igneous rocks, some schistose, some massive. The white limestones are closely folded and have great variation in dip. The igneous rocks, so far as determined from the small collection made, include gabbros, diorites, amphibolites, diabases, and pyroxene-syenites. All these are comparatively massive. The greenstoneschists, which occupy considerable areas, are chloritic.

The inlet is bordered on the west by lands of the Tongass National Forest, which are included in the 13,720 acres (5,550 ha) Hydaburg Roadless Area.

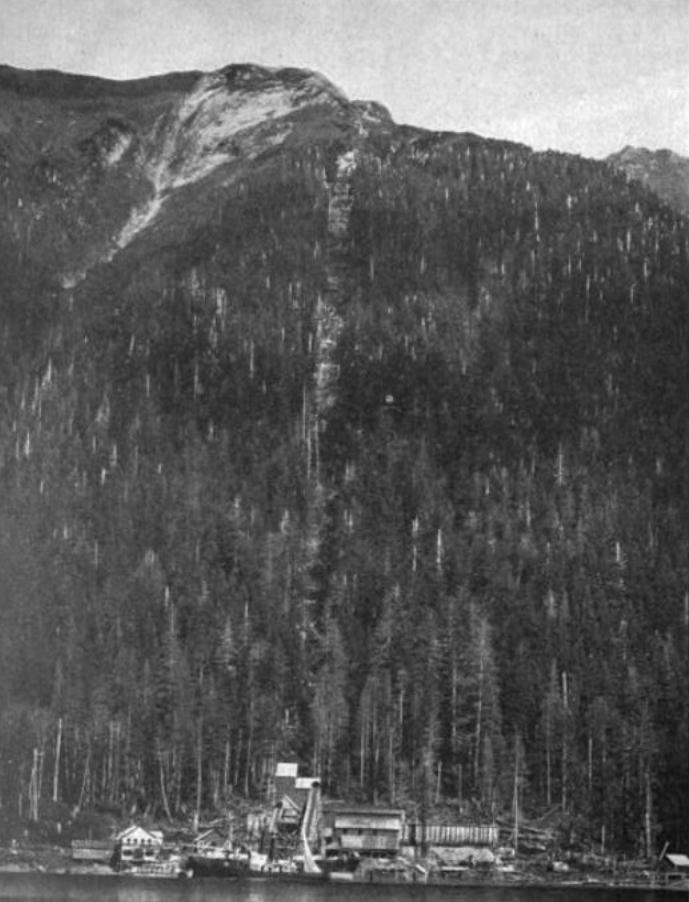
The settlement of Coppermount was on the Hetta Inlet.

== History ==
A trail across this divide was a link in the mail route to the mining settlements of Coppermount and Sulzer. Freight was delivered by small steamers from Ketchikan, and also by Puget Sound vessels, which occasionally called at the camps along the inlet.

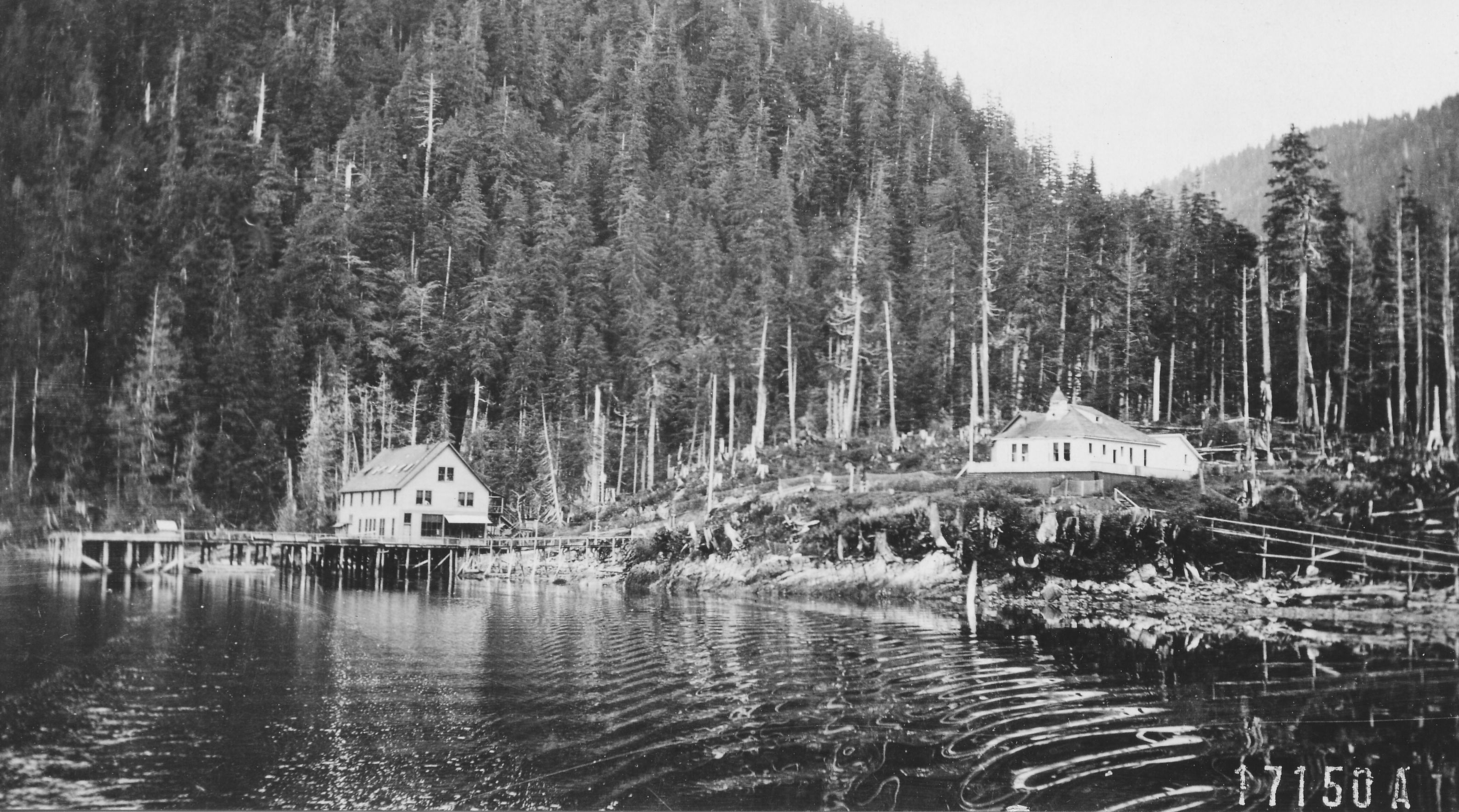
Sulzer was a small community on the shore of Hetta Inlet in the Tongass National Forest.
