= B. Frank Heintzleman =

American politician

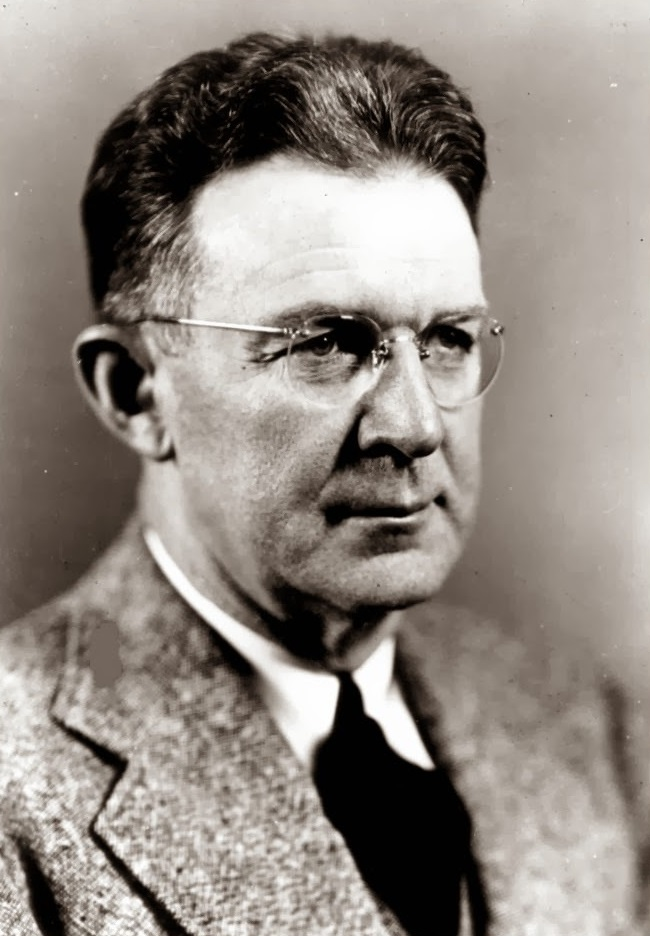

8th Governor of Alaska Territory
- In office April 10, 1953 – January 4, 1957
- Nominated by: Dwight D. Eisenhower
- Preceded by: Ernest Gruening
- Succeeded by: Waino Edward Hendrickson Territorial Acting Governor of Alaska

Personal details
- Born: Benjamin Franklin Heintzleman; December 3, 1888 Fayetteville, Pennsylvania
- Died: June 24, 1965 (aged 76) Juneau, Alaska
- Party: Republican

Benjamin Franklin Heintzleman (December 3, 1888 – June 24, 1965) was an American forester who spent much of his career supporting the development of Alaska Territory. Following a career with the United States Forest Service he was appointed Governor of Alaska Territory, a position he held from 1953 till 1957. During his term as governor he continued to support economic development but was largely opposed to efforts granting statehood to Alaska.

== Background ==
Heintzleman was born to Andrew J. and Rebecca Jane Heintzleman in Fayetteville, Pennsylvania, on December 3, 1888. He was educated in public schools before being graduated from the Pennsylvania State College with a Bachelor of Forestry in 1907 and from Yale University with a Master of Forestry in 1910.

Shortly after graduation, Heintzleman joined the United States Forest Service and worked in Oregon and Washington. With the United States entry into World War I, he was transferred to Alaska to oversee lumber production. There, from 1918 till 1934, he served as Assistant Regional Forester in Ketchikan, Alaska. In this role he assisted the development of the region's pulp and lumber industries and was key to the construction of two pulp mills in southeast Alaska. During this time he wrote the 1921 Forest Service bulletin "The Forests of Alaska".

Heintzleman was made head of the National Recovery Administration forest conservation efforts in 1934. In 1937, he was appointed Alaskan Representative of the Federal Power Commission. The same year he was promoted to Regional Forester for Alaska, a post he held till 1953. As Regional Forester he also held the position of Alaskan Commissioner of the United States Department of Agriculture. In this role he encouraged the development of lumber and pulp mills along with other industrial development. From 1939 to 1940 he served as chairman of the Alaska Territorial Planning Board.

== Governorship ==
Heintzleman was appointed to become Governor of Alaska Territory by President Dwight D. Eisenhower on March 11, 1953. Following confirmation, his term of office began on April 10 of the same year.

The primary focus of the new governor's administration was economic development. Toward this end he called for revised homesteading and land laws along with updated mineral leases, power licenses, and timber contracts. The Alaskan governor also joined with Hawaiian Territorial Governor Samuel Wilder King in a call for a 25-year tax holiday to promote industrial development in the two territories. Finally, Heintzleman opposed the native claim of "possessory rights" to millions of acres of land, wishing to open the land to development. This opposition led to a prolonged battle in the United States Court of Claims.

Heintzleman submitted his resignation on December 18, 1956. His letter of resignation explain his departure by pointing out that he "had forty-six years of public service" and desired "to retire to less strenuous work". The timing, three months before the end of his term, was occasioned by the outgoing governor's desire to allow for his replacement to be in place before the next territorial legislature convened on January 28, 1957. Heintzleman's resignation became effective on January 4, 1957, when Territorial Secretary became Acting Governor. A permanent replacement was not named until May 9, 1957, when President Eisenhower nominated Michael Anthony Stepovich.

=== Opinion on statehood ===
The leading political issue within Alaska at the time was the territory's gaining statehood. Heintzleman's opinion on the matter evolved over time. At the beginning of his term of office, he felt Alaska's efforts to become a state were "a little premature".

After a year, he revised his opinion and instead proposed that the territory be divided, with statehood for the most populous southern and eastern areas. Heintzleman laid out his plan in an April 3, 1954, letter to speaker Joseph W. Martin Jr., calling for a border to be drawn starting at the Alaska-Yukon border, following the Brooks Range and then the 152nd meridian west, until reaching the Gulf of Alaska, and veering into the Shelikof Strait so that Kodiak Island is included in the east. This eastern area, including Anchorage, Fairbanks, and the Alaska Panhandle, would contain about 85% of the then-territory's population, and according to Heintzleman should be granted statehood. Meanwhile, the north and west of Alaska, being largely unsettled, would remain a territory. The proposal to divide the territory was so unpopular among Alaskans that a petition drive was organized asking President Eisenhower to remove Heintzleman as governor.

By 1956, the Alaskan governor no longer opposed statehood and supported the creation of a state constitution. Heintzleman signed the bill establishing the Alaska Constitutional Convention.

== After office ==
From 1957 till 1959, Heintzleman was a member of the University of Alaska Board of Regents. He then served, in 1960, as an advisor to the Alaska Rail and Highway Commission. Heintzleman died of a heart attack on June 24, 1965, in Juneau, Alaska. He was buried in Chambersburg, Pennsylvania. Heintzleman Ridge, a geographic feature north of Juneau, was named after him as a memorial in 1966.

Political offices
Preceded by Ernest Gruening	Territorial Governor of Alaska; 1953–1957	Succeeded by Waino Edward Hendrickson; Acting
