= Sulzer, Alaska =

Ghost town in Alaska, United States

Sulzer
- Ghost town
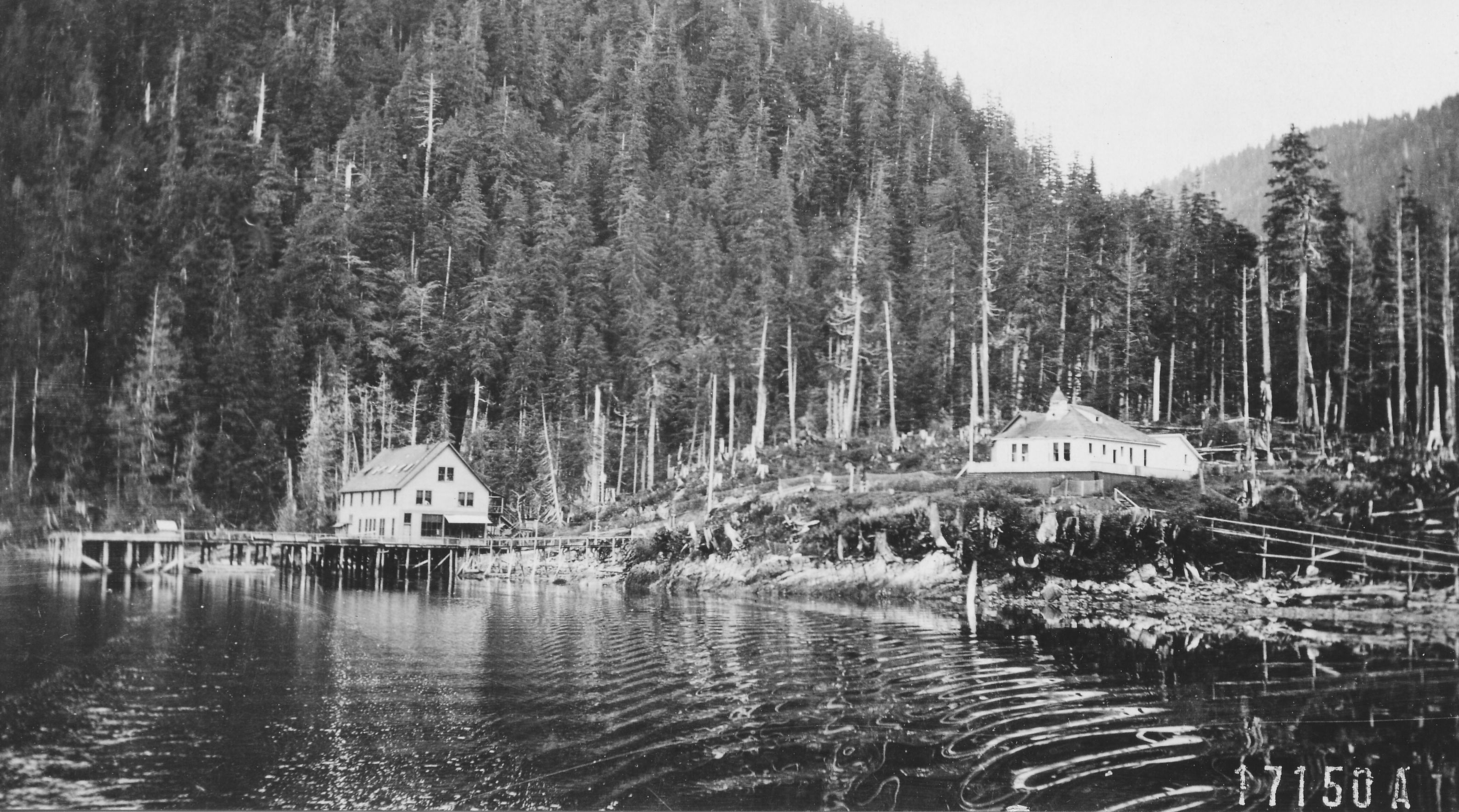
- Sulzer was a small community on the shore of Hetta Inlet on Prince of Wales Island.

- Location in Alaska
- Country: United States
- State: Alaska
- Island: Prince of Wales Island
- Founder: William Sulzer
- Time zone: UTC-9 (AKST)
  - Summer (DST): UTC-8 (AKDT)

Sulzer, Alaska is a ghost town on Prince of Wales Island in the U.S. state of Alaska. The community centered on a copper mine established by William Sulzer on the shore of Hetta Inlet. Operated by the Alaska Consolidated Mining and Smelting Company, the Jumbo Mine was active from 1907 to 1918 and was one of Alaska's largest copper producers.

Charles August Sulzer, brother of William and delegate to the United States Congress from the Territory of Alaska, lived in Sulzer when he took ill in April 1919 and died while on board a boat en route to Ketchikan.
