= Waino Hendrickson =

American politician (1896–1983)

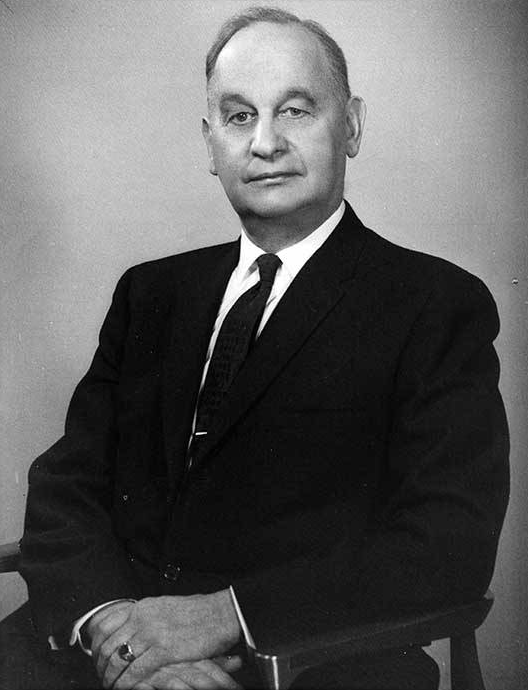
- Hendrickson in 1957

Acting Territorial Governor of Alaska
- In office August 9, 1958 – January 3, 1959
- Preceded by: Mike Stepovich (as Territorial Governor of Alaska)
- Succeeded by: William A. Egan (as Governor of Alaska)
- In office January 3, 1957 – April 8, 1957
- Preceded by: B. Frank Heintzleman (as Territorial Governor)
- Succeeded by: Mike Stepovich (as Territorial Governor)

Secretary of Alaska Territory
- In office April 11, 1953 – January 3, 1959
- Preceded by: Burke Riley
- Succeeded by: Hugh Wade as Secretary of the State of Alaska

Member of the Alaska Territorial House of Representatives
- In office 1948–1953

Mayor of Juneau, Alaska
- In office 1946–1953
- Preceded by: Ernest Parsons
- Succeeded by: Bert F. McDowell

Personal details
- Born: Waino Edward Hendrickson; June 18, 1896 Juneau, District of Alaska
- Died: June 22, 1983 (aged 87)
- Party: Republican
- Spouse: Marion Kingsnorth Jones (1924–1962; her death)
- Relations: Linn A. Forrest (in-law)
- Children: 1
- Occupation: Small business owner/operator

Waino Edward Hendrickson (June 18, 1896 – June 22, 1983) was an American Republican politician & businessman, the final Governor of the Territory of Alaska, before statehood.

Hendrickson was born in Juneau in 1896. He served in World War I before he became a manager at the Juneau city dock. He worked in business before he entered politics in 1946 and was elected Mayor of Juneau. He served as mayor until 1953. He was also a member of the Territorial House from 1948 to 1953.

He was Secretary of Alaska Territory from 1953 to 1959 in which capacity he served as acting governor twice because of the resignations of Governors Frank Heintzleman and Mike Stepovich.

== Early life ==
Hendrickson was born June 18, 1896, in Juneau, Alaska, where he grew up the son of Finnish immigrants. After graduating from Juneau High School in 1916, he worked in the mine. After an accident, Hendrickson lost partial sight in one eye. After this, he served in the U.S. military during World War I, and was en route to France before the armistice was signed. After being discharged from the army, he worked as a manager at the Juneau city dock.

== Political career ==
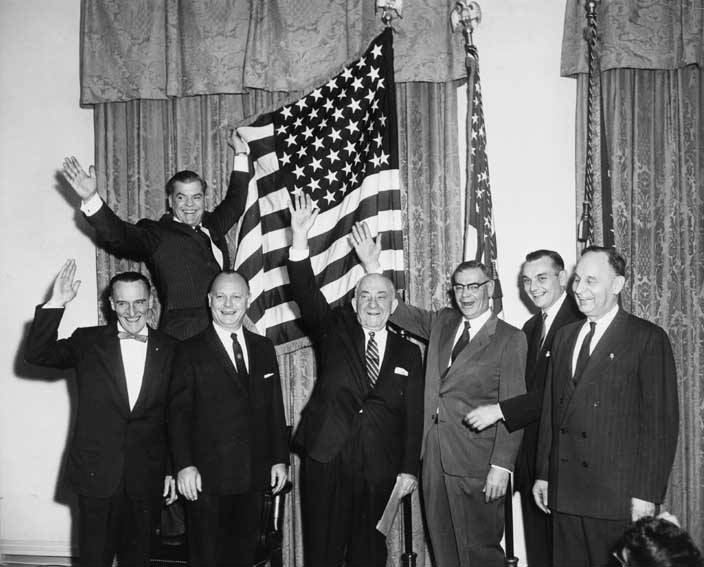
Waino Hendrickson, furthest right, celebrates Alaska statehood on January 3rd, 1959

Hendrickson entered politics in 1946, when, upon the urging of his friends, he was elected mayor of Juneau. In this role, he helped the city gain the power to levy and use sales tax, which had not been enforced before, leading to a lack of funding for Juneau. Because of the collection of this tax, Hendrickson developed Juneau, leading the city to become the first city in Alaska to be fully paved. He served as Mayor of Juneau until 1953. While serving in this role, he was also a member of the territorial House of Representatives from 1948 to 1953.

In 1953, Hendrickson was appointed Secretary of Alaska Territory (equivalent to Lieutenant Governor of Alaska today) by President Dwight D. Eisenhower, under Governor Frank Heintzleman. He held this office until statehood, serving as acting governor twice, once in 1957, and again from 1958 to 1959. Hendrickson was the first Alaska governor born in the territory. After statehood Hendrickson served on several government commissions, as well as chairing the Interior Department's Alaska Field Committee, and the Juneau office of the Bureau of Land Management. He retired due to poor eyesight, in 1965.

== Later life ==
Hendrickson would stay up at night to care for his wife, who was ill with cancer. She died in 1962.

After his retirement, Hendrickson went to live with his daughter in Anchorage, Alaska, and spent the rest of his life with her until he died in 1983, at the age of 87.

Political offices
Preceded by Mike Stepovich	Territorial Governor of Alaska; 1958 – 1959 (acting)	Succeeded by William A. Egan (as Governor of Alaska)
Preceded by B. Frank Heintzleman	Territorial Governor of Alaska; 1957 (acting)	Succeeded by Mike Stepovich
