= Alaska Territory's at-large congressional district =

Former congressional district

Coordinates: 64°N 153°W

- Obsolete district
- Created: 1906, as a non-voting delegate was granted by Congress
- Eliminated: 1959, as a result of statehood
- Years active: 1906–1959

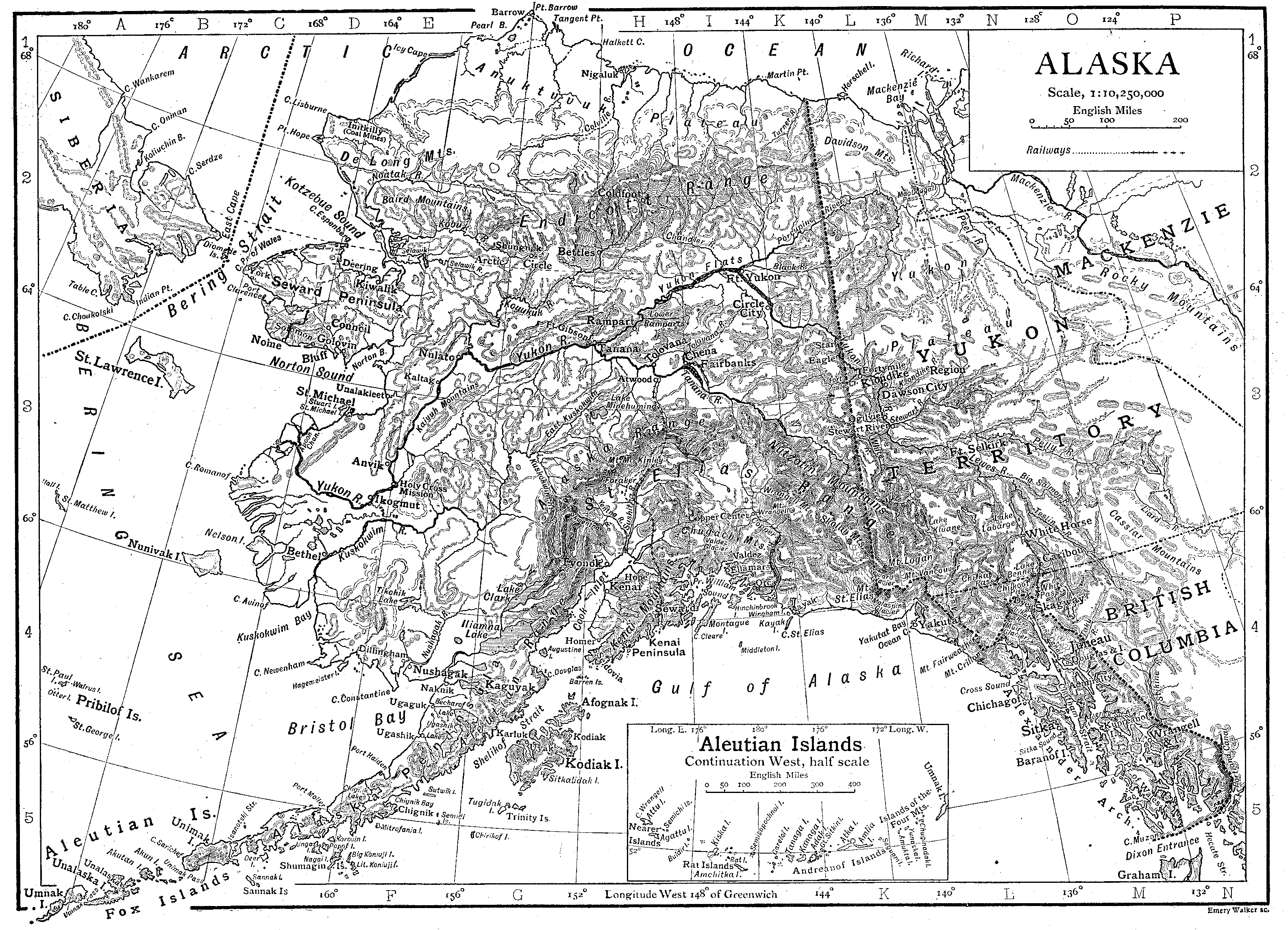
Alaska Territory, 1912–1959

Alaska Territory's at-large congressional district (also District of Alaska's at-large congressional district) was a congressional district created in 1906 to represent the District of Alaska, which was reorganized into the Alaska Territory in 1912. After Alaska's admission to the Union as the 49th state by act of Congress on January 3, 1959, this district evolved into Alaska's at-large congressional district.

In the years following the Alaska Purchase, Alaskans held a series of political conventions focused on sending a representative to the U.S. Congress. The purpose was to lobby mainly for representation in the body, in similar fashion to the later application of the Tennessee Act to lobby for Alaskan statehood, but also for greater autonomy for Alaska. The first convention, held in 1881, saw a non-partisan group send a Democrat (M. D. Ball) to Washington, who worked with a Republican senator (Benjamin Harrison) to craft the organic act which created the District of Alaska. Ball and several subsequent individuals were unable to convince Congress to grant the District a delegate, however. Events changed as the population of Alaska increased around the turn of the 20th century, mainly on account of immigration due to gold rushes.

On May 7, 1906, an act of Congress gave the District of Alaska the authority to elect a Congressional delegate. On August 24, 1912, the District of Alaska was reorganized into an organized incorporated territory and continued to elect delegates until Alaska became a state in 1959.

== List of delegates representing the district ==
Delegate	Party	Years	Cong ress	Electoral history
District created May 7, 1906
Vacant		May 7, 1906 – August 14, 1906	59th	
Frank Hinman Waskey (Nome)	Democratic (Note: Waskey was elected on a nonpartisan ticket)	August 14, 1906 – March 3, 1907	59th	Elected in 1906. Retired.
Thomas Cale (Fairbanks)	Independent	March 4, 1907 – March 3, 1909	60th	Elected in 1906. Retired.
James Wickersham (Fairbanks)	Republican	March 4, 1909 – March 3, 1917	61st 62nd 63rd 64th	Elected in 1908. Re-elected in 1910. Re-elected in 1912. Re-elected in 1914. Lost re-election.
Charles August Sulzer (Sulzer)	Democratic	March 4, 1917 – January 7, 1919	65th	Elected in 1916. Lost election contest.
James Wickersham (Fairbanks)	Republican	January 7, 1919 – March 3, 1919	65th	Won election contest. Lost re-election.
Charles August Sulzer (Sulzer)	Democratic	March 4, 1919 – April 15, 1919	66th	Elected in 1918. Died.
Vacant		April 15, 1919 – July 1, 1919	66th	
George Barnes Grigsby (Juneau)	Democratic	July 1, 1919 – March 1, 1921	66th	Elected June 5, 1919 to finish Sulzer's term and seated July 1, 1919. Lost election contest.
James Wickersham (Fairbanks)	Republican	March 1, 1921 – March 3, 1921	66th	Won election contest. Retired.
Daniel Sutherland (Juneau)	Republican	March 4, 1921 – March 3, 1931	67th 68th 69th 70th 71st	Elected in 1920. Re-elected in 1922. Re-elected in 1924. Re-elected in 1926. Re-elected in 1928. Retired.
James Wickersham (Juneau)	Republican	March 4, 1931 – March 3, 1933	72nd	Elected in 1930. Lost re-election.
Anthony Dimond (Valdez)	Democratic	March 4, 1933 – January 3, 1945	73rd 74th 75th 76th 77th 78th	Elected in 1932. Re-elected in 1934. Re-elected in 1936. Re-elected in 1938. Re-elected in 1940. Re-elected in 1942. Retired to become a state judge.
Bob Bartlett (Juneau)	Democratic	January 3, 1945 – January 3, 1959	79th 80th 81st 82nd 83rd 84th 85th	Elected in 1944. Elected in 1946. Elected in 1948. Elected in 1950. Elected in 1952. Elected in 1954. Elected in 1956. Ran for U.S. senator upon statehood.
District eliminated January 3, 1959

== See also ==
- Alaska's at-large congressional district
