= Anthony Dimond =

American judge

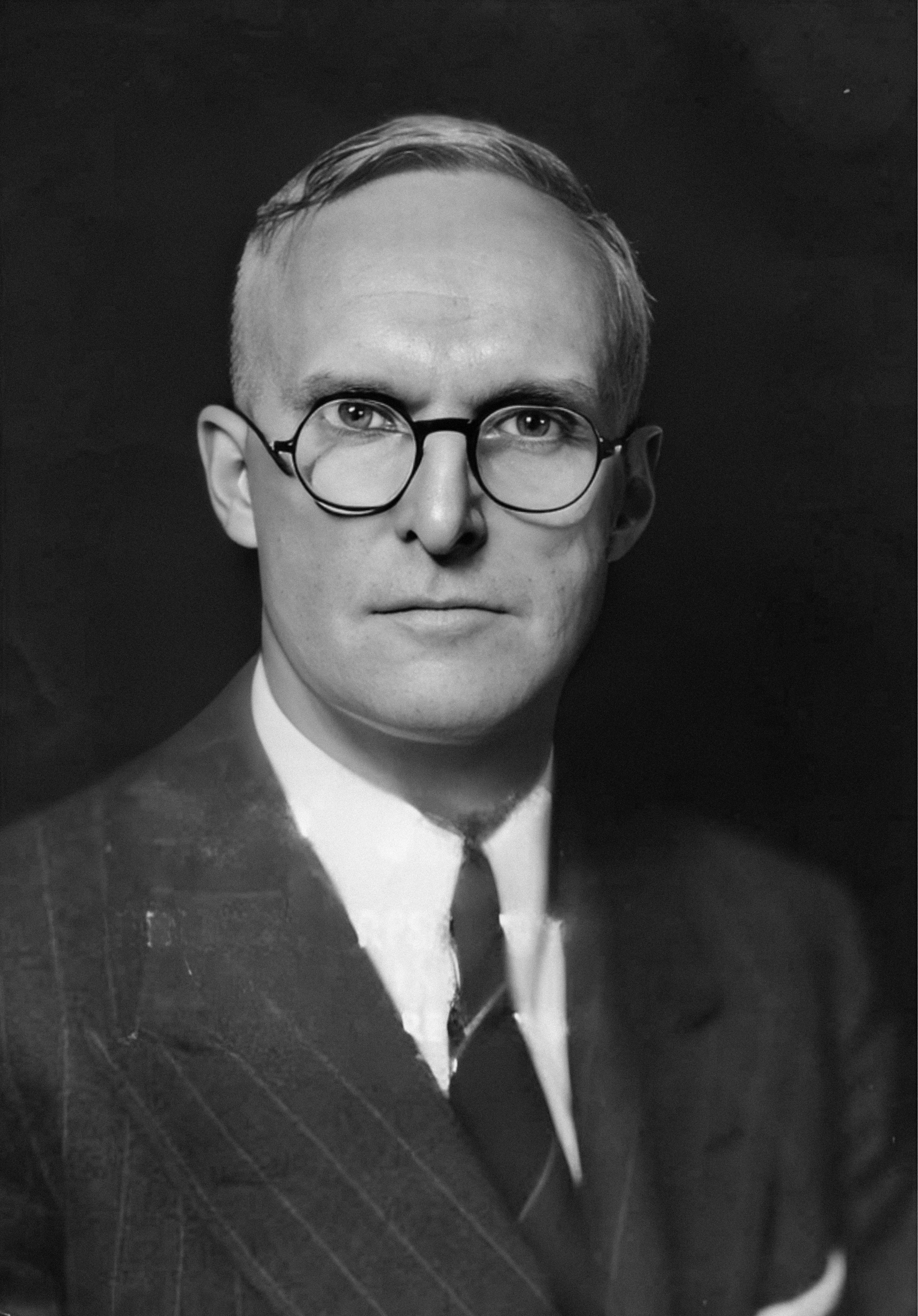
- Dimond c. 1939

Delegate to the U.S. House of Representatives from Alaska Territory's at-large district
- In office March 4, 1933 – January 3, 1945
- Preceded by: James Wickersham
- Succeeded by: Bob Bartlett

Judge for the Third Division of Alaska Territory
- In office January 3, 1945 – May 28, 1953
- President: Harry Truman; Dwight Eisenhower

Member of the Alaska Territorial Senate
- In office 1923–1926
- In office 1929–1932

Mayor of Valdez
- In office 1925–1928
- In office 1920–1922

Personal details
- Born: November 30, 1881 Palatine Bridge, New York, U.S.
- Died: May 28, 1953 (aged 71) Anchorage, Alaska Territory, U.S.
- Party: Democratic
- Spouse: Dorothea M. Dimond
- Children: 3, including John H. Dimond
- Profession: Judge, lawyer, schoolteacher

Anthony Joseph Dimond (November 30, 1881 – May 28, 1953) was an American Democratic Party politician who was the Alaska Territory Delegate in the United States House of Representatives from 1933 to 1945. Dimond was also an early champion of Alaska statehood.

== Early life ==
Dimond, known as "Tony," was born in Palatine Bridge, Montgomery County, New York and attended Catholic schools, taught school in Montgomery County (1900–1903), and was a prospector/miner in Alaska (1905–1912) before studying law and beginning practice in Valdez (1913).

== Political career ==
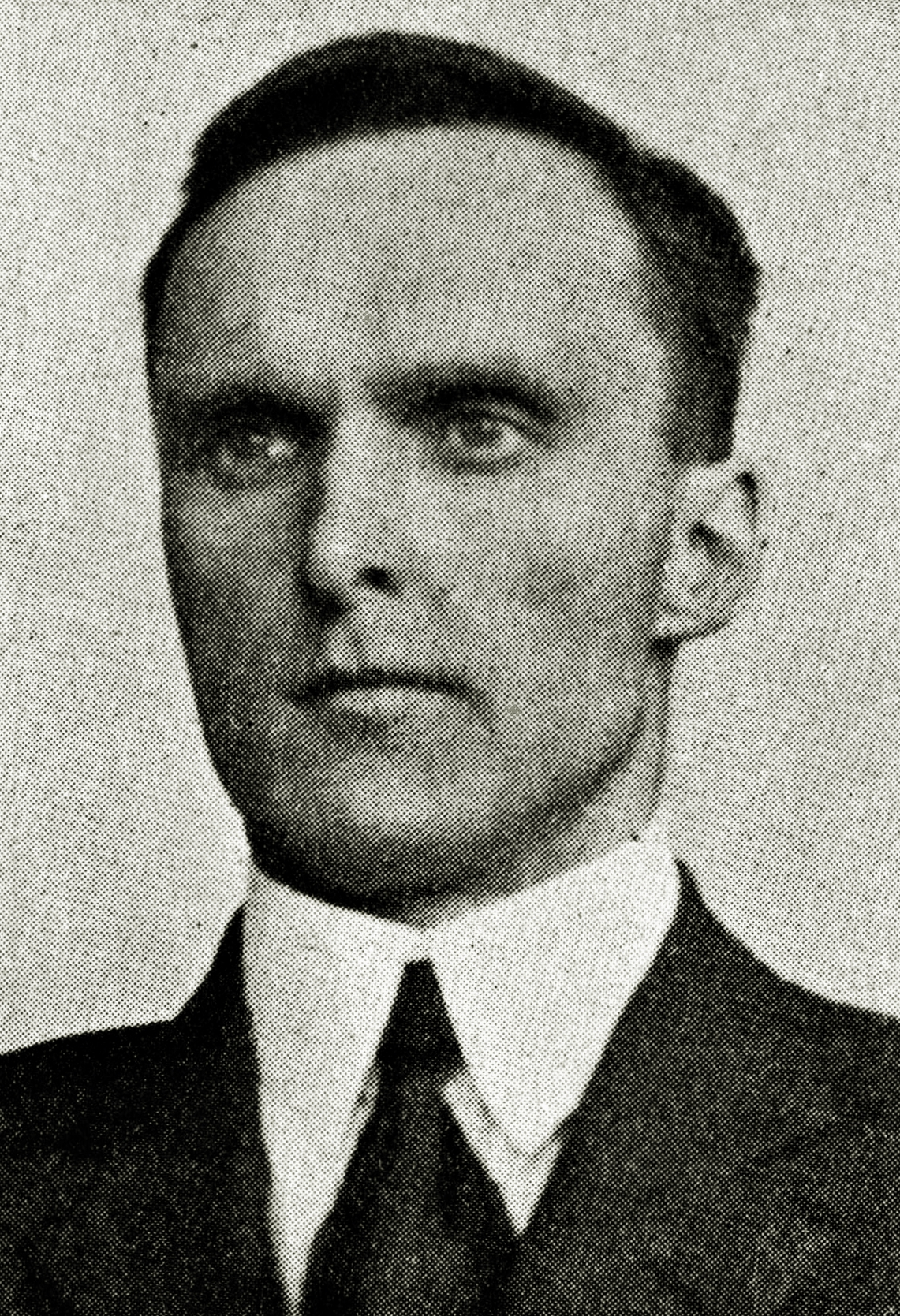
Dimond as Mayor of Valdez, c. 1922

Dimond's political experience includes: US Commissioner in Chisana, Alaska (1913–1914); Special Assistant US Attorney for the 3rd Judicial Division of Alaska in Valdez (1917); Mayor of Valdez (1920–1922, 1925–1932); Alaska Territorial Senate (1923–1926, 1929–1932); and District Judge for the 3rd Division of Alaska (1945–1953). He also served as a Delegate to the Democratic National Convention in 1936 and 1940. He died on May 28, 1953, in Anchorage.

A Roman Catholic, Dimond was a member of organizations such as the Elks, Moose and Eagles.

=== Mentees' careers ===
His secretary from 1933 to 1934, Bob Bartlett, eventually became a United States senator from Alaska, serving from 1959 to 1968. His godson, Bill Egan, became Alaska's first Governor after Statehood, serving from 1959 to 1966 and from 1970 to 1974. His son, John H. Dimond, became a Justice of the Alaska Supreme Court following statehood.

=== Legacy ===
Today, November 30 is celebrated by the State of Alaska as "Anthony Dimond Day." In Anchorage, A. J. Dimond High School and Dimond Boulevard, a major thoroughfare, are named after him.

=== Slattery Report ===
In 1940, when President Franklin D. Roosevelt was considering making Alaska an international Jewish homeland, Dimond was the main force behind defeating the effort.

== See also ==
- Dimond Center; like Dimond High School, its name derives from its proximity to Dimond Boulevard
- The Yiddish Policemen's Union, a 2007 alternate history novel by Michael Chabon whose divergence point from actual history is the death of Dimond in a 1941 car accident.
- List of mayors of Valdez, Alaska

U.S. House of Representatives
Preceded by James Wickersham	Delegate to the U.S. House of Representatives from Alaska Territory; March 4, 1933 – January 3, 1945	Succeeded by Bob Bartlett
