= Frank Hinman Waskey =

American politician

Frank H. Waskey
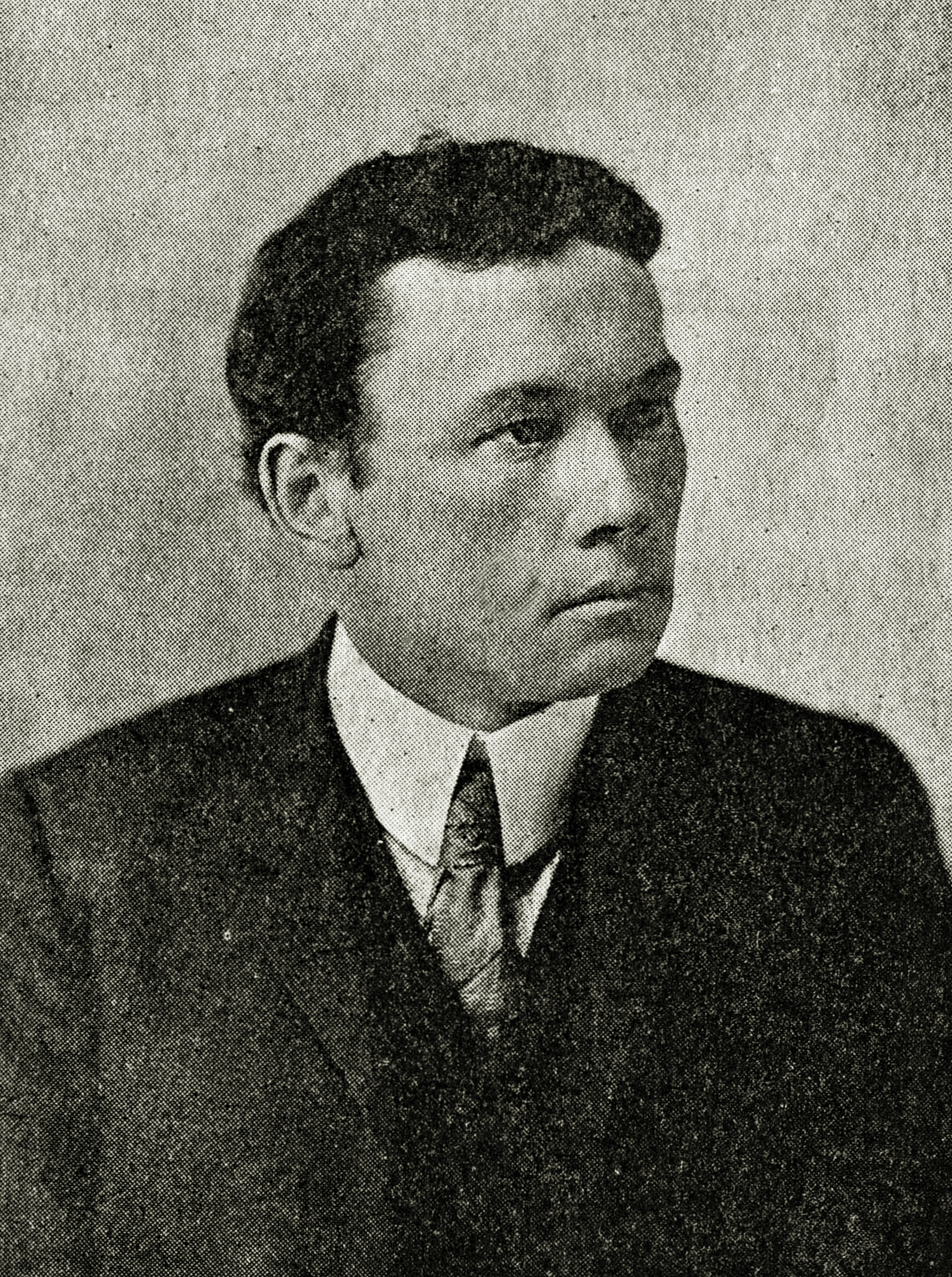

Delegate to the U.S. House of Representatives from Alaska Territory's at-large district
- In office August 14, 1906 – March 4, 1907
- Preceded by: Constituency established
- Succeeded by: Thomas Cale

Personal details
- Born: Frank Hinman Waskey; April 20, 1875 Lake City, Minnesota, U.S.
- Died: January 18, 1964 (aged 88) Oakville, Washington, U.S.
- Resting place: Shelton Cemetery in Shelton, Washington
- Party: Democratic

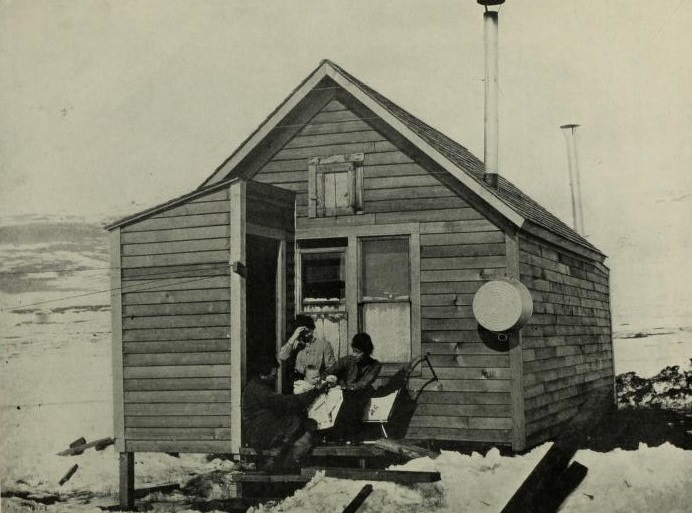
The Alaskan Delegate to Congress, and his Home

Frank Hinman Waskey (April 20, 1875 – January 18, 1964) was a delegate from the District of Alaska to the United States House of Representatives from 1906 to 1907.

== Biography ==
He was born in Lake City, Minnesota in Wabasha County. He attended the public schools of Minneapolis, moved to Alaska in February 1898, and settled in Nome. He engaged in mining and was the president of a mining company. He was also the director of a bank and a publishing company, both in Nome.

=== Congress ===
He was elected as a Democrat to the Fifty-ninth Congress as the first Delegate from Alaska and served from August 14, 1906, to March 3, 1907. He was not a candidate for renomination in 1906.

=== Later career ===
He prospected for minerals in Alaska and worked as a curio dealer from 1911 to 1955. From 1915 to 1918, he was a United States commissioner at Fortuna Ledge, Alaska.

=== Death and burial ===
He moved to Oakville, Washington in 1956, where he died on January 18, 1964. He was interred in Shelton Cemetery in Shelton, Washington.

U.S. House of Representatives
Preceded by None	Delegate to the U.S. House of Representatives from Alaska Territory; August 14, 1906 – March 3, 1907	Succeeded by Thomas Cale
