= Daniel Sutherland =

American politician (1869–1955)

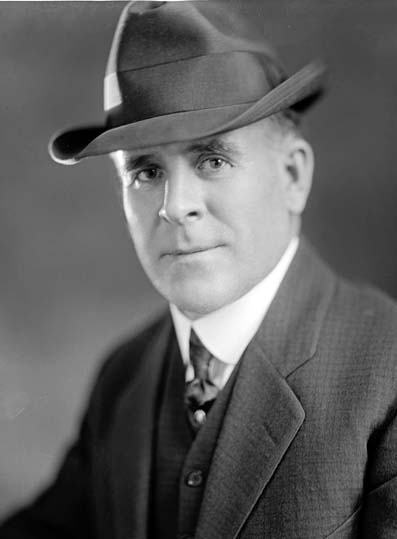

Delegate to the U.S. House of Representatives from Alaska Territory's at-large district
- In office March 4, 1921 – March 3, 1931
- Preceded by: James Wickersham
- Succeeded by: James Wickersham

President of the Alaska Territorial Senate
- In office 1915–1917
- Preceded by: L.V. Ray
- Succeeded by: O. P. Hubbard

Member of the Alaska Senate from the 4st district
- In office March 3, 1913 – March 7, 1921 Serving with Henry Roden (1913-1915); O.P. Gaustad (1915-1919); Luther C. Hess (1919-1921)
- Preceded by: Position Established
- Succeeded by: Earnest C. Collins

Personal details
- Born: April 17, 1869 Pleasant Bay, Cape Breton Island, Nova Scotia, Canada
- Died: March 24, 1955 (aged 85) Abingtown Township, Pennsylvania, U.S.
- Party: Republican

Daniel Alexander Sutherland (April 17, 1869 – March 24, 1955), nicknamed "Fighting Dan", was an American businessperson and politician who served in the United States House of Representatives during the 1920s as the delegate from what was then the Alaska Territory.

Sutherland was born in Pleasant Bay, Nova Scotia, on Cape Breton Island in Canada. He moved with his parents to Essex in the U.S. state of Massachusetts in 1876, where he attended the public schools. He was later employed as a grocer's clerk, and subsequently engaged in the fish business.

Sutherland moved to Circle City, Alaska, in 1898. When gold was discovered in the sands of Nome in 1900 he moved across the territory and became a prospector eventually becoming a co-owner of a mining company. In 1909, he moved to Juneau.

After a campaign that crossed the Alaska by dog sled, he was elected to the first territorial senate from 1912 to 1920, serving as its president in 1915. During World War I he enrolled in the United States Naval Reserve. He was very popular, and was elected as a Republican to the 67th, 68th, 69th, 70th, and 71st Congresses, serving from March 4, 1921, to March 3, 1931. He earned his nickname for his combative style on Capitol Hill. He was not a candidate for renomination in 1930.

Sutherland supported home rule for the territory, and wanted to break Alaska's dependence on shipping companies based out of the West Coast. He also promoted aircraft as a way to deliver mail and needed supplies across the Alaska Bush and Interior during the winter months, when they were inaccessible by steamship, roads, or most other forms of transportation. He lobbied for the first experimental flights by the U.S. Post Office, which were carried out in February 1924, and when a diphtheria epidemic struck Nome in 1925, he supported an air rescue. Governor Scott Bone ultimately decided to use a dog sled relay in what became known as the 1925 serum run to Nome, but in the 1930s aircraft did replace the dog sled as the primary form of transportation.

After his ten years as a delegate, Sutherland was a purchasing agent for the Ogontz School in the state of Pennsylvania from 1931 to 1950. He died in Abington on March 24, 1955, and his remains were cremated and deposited in St. Paul's Church Cemetery in Elkins Park, Pennsylvania.

U.S. House of Representatives
Preceded by James Wickersham	Delegate to the U.S. House of Representatives from Alaska Territory; March 4, 1921 – March 3, 1931	Succeeded by James Wickersham
