= Thomas Cale =

American politician

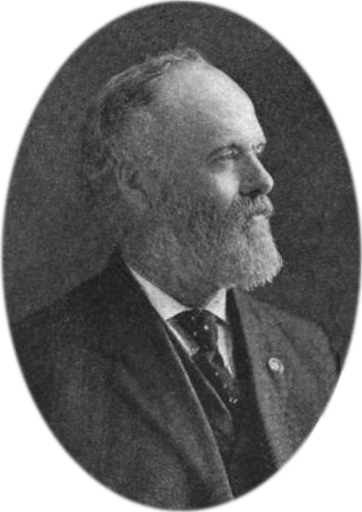

Delegate to the U.S. House of Representatives from Alaska Territory's at-large district
- In office March 4, 1907 – March 3, 1909
- Preceded by: Frank Hinman Waskey
- Succeeded by: James Wickersham

Personal details
- Born: September 17, 1848 Underhill, Vermont, U.S.
- Died: February 3, 1941 (aged 92) Fond du Lac, Wisconsin, U.S.
- Resting place: Calvary Cemetery
- Party: Independent
- Profession: teacher, sheriff, farmer, miner

Thomas Cale (September 17, 1848 – February 3, 1941) was a delegate to the United States House of Representatives from the District of Alaska.

== Biography ==
He was born in Underhill, Vermont, in Chittenden County. He attended the district schools and Bell Academy at Underhill Flats. In 1866, he moved to Fort Edward, New York, in Washington County. He taught school in Underhill Center, Vermont, in 1867 and 1868.

He moved to Fond du Lac, Wisconsin, in 1869, taught school in several districts in Fond du Lac County, and then engaged in agricultural pursuits near Eden, Wisconsin.

=== Early political career ===
He was the town clerk of Eden from 1881 to 1884. From 1884 to 1886, he was a member of the Board of Supervisors of Fond du Lac County. He returned to Fond du Lac County and served as undersheriff of Fond du Lac County from 1886 to 1888. He was the county sheriff from 1888 to 1890. He was engaged as a salesman of farm machinery.

=== Congress ===
In 1898, he moved to Fairbanks, Alaska, and engaged in mining. He was elected as an independent to the Sixtieth Congress. He served from March 4, 1907, to March 3, 1909, but he was not a candidate for renomination in 1908.

=== Later career ===
He engaged in farming near McLaughlin, South Dakota, from 1910 to 1915 and near Stevens Point, Wisconsin, from 1915 to 1920. He retired from active pursuits in 1920 and resided in Fond du Lac, Wisconsin, until his death.

=== Death and burial ===
He died in Fond du Lac on February 3, 1941. He was interred in Cavalry Cemetery.

U.S. House of Representatives
Preceded by Frank Hinman Waskey	Delegate to the U.S. House of Representatives from Alaska Territory; March 4, 1907 – March 3, 1909	Succeeded by James Wickersham
