= James Wickersham =

American politician (1857-1939)

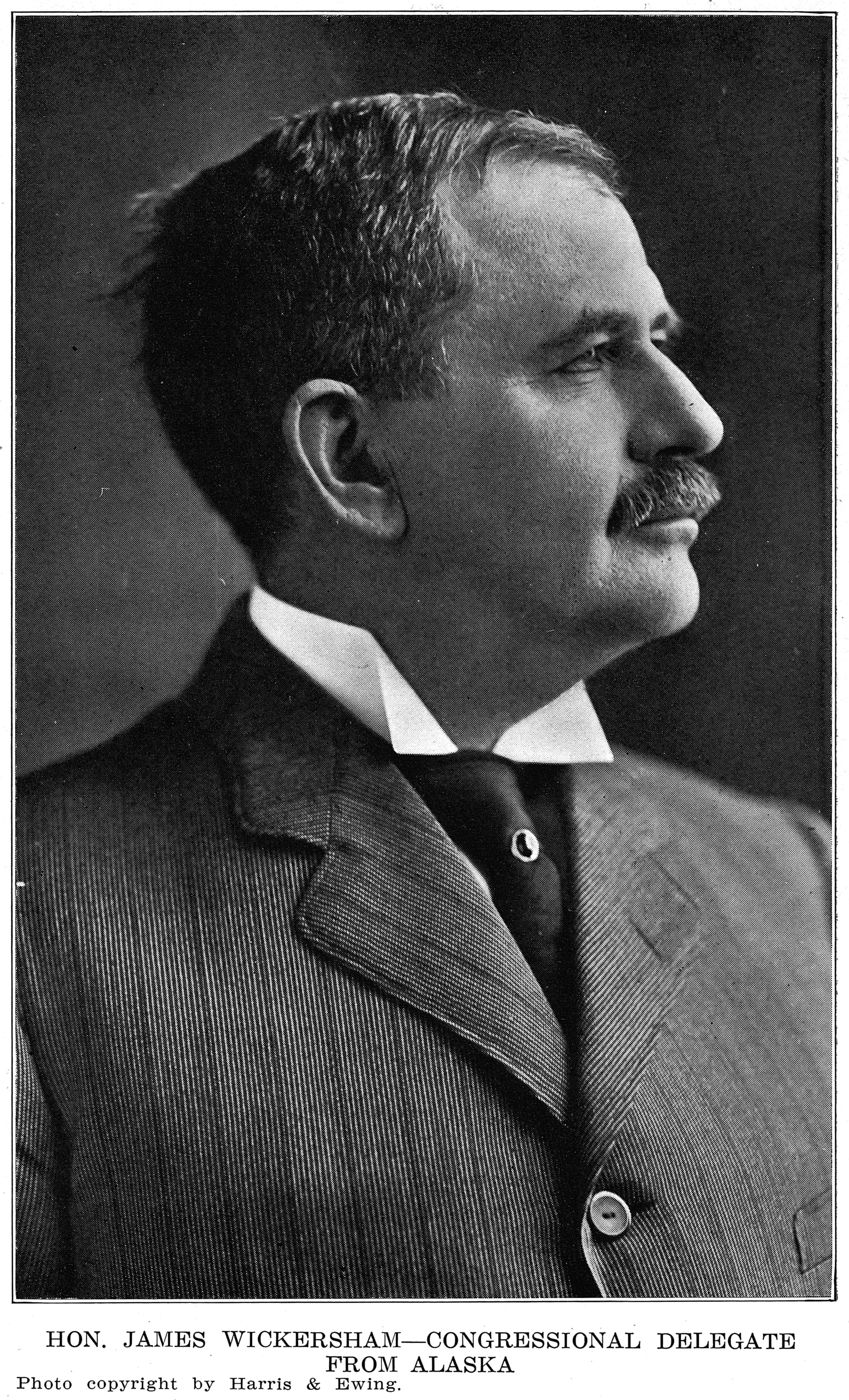

Delegate to the U.S. House of Representatives from Alaska Territory's at-large district
- In office March 4, 1931 – March 3, 1933
- Preceded by: Daniel Sutherland
- Succeeded by: Anthony Dimond
- In office March 1, 1921 – March 3, 1921
- Preceded by: George Barnes Grigsby
- Succeeded by: Daniel Sutherland
- In office January 7, 1919 – March 3, 1919
- Preceded by: Charles August Sulzer
- Succeeded by: Charles August Sulzer
- In office March 4, 1909 – March 3, 1917
- Preceded by: Thomas Cale
- Succeeded by: Charles August Sulzer

Personal details
- Born: August 24, 1857 Patoka, Illinois, U.S.
- Died: October 24, 1939 (aged 82) Juneau, Alaska Territory, U.S.
- Party: Republican
- Spouse: Deborah
- Profession: judge, politician

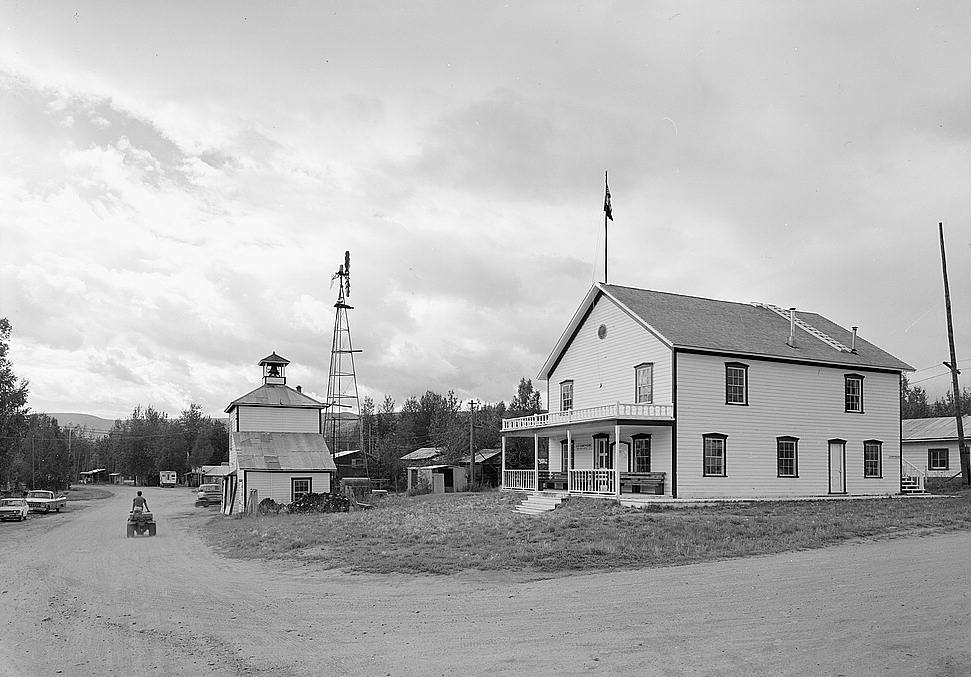
Wickersham's courthouse in Eagle. Wickersham moved the Third District court headquarters to Fairbanks in 1903.

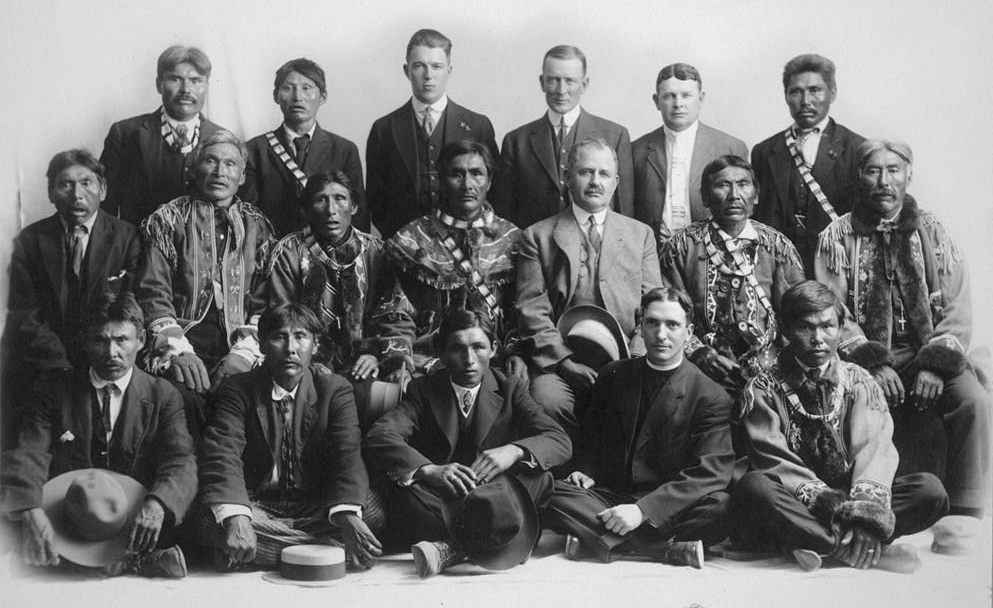
Judge Wickersham (center) in council with Indian chiefs, Fairbanks, Alaska

James Wickersham (August 24, 1857 – October 24, 1939) was a district judge for Alaska, appointed by U.S. President William McKinley to the Third Judicial District in 1900. He resigned his post in 1908 and was subsequently elected as Alaska's delegate to Congress, serving until 1917 and then being re-elected in 1930. He was instrumental in the passage of the Organic Act of 1912, which granted Alaska territorial status. He also introduced the Alaska Railroad Bill, legislation to establish McKinley Park, and the first Alaska Statehood Bill in 1916. He was among those responsible for the creation of the Alaska Agricultural College and School of Mines, which later became the University of Alaska. A residence hall on the University of Alaska Fairbanks campus is named in his honor.

== Biography ==
=== Early years ===
Wickersham was born near Patoka, Illinois in August 1857. Many years later, in 1883, he and his wife Deborah moved to Tacoma, Washington Territory, where he became a judge. While in Tacoma he helped lead a mob that forced the city's Chinese population out of town, and was later arrested as one of the "Tacoma Twenty-Seven," though he was never convicted. He was a member of the Tacoma Academy of Science and was President of that organization in 1893.

He presented a paper to the Academy on Feb. 6, 1893, entitled, "Is it Mount Tacoma, or Rainier?" During the presentation the following prominent Indians representing the Puyallup, Nesqually and Klickitat tribes were seated on the platform: George Leschi, son of Quiemuth, a leader in the Indian war of 1855; Jack Simmons; John Hiaton, one of the patriarchs of the reservation, 80 years of age, and a signer of the treaty of 1854; Mrs. John Hiaton and John Powers". The presentation has been reproduced by a digital file created at the Library of Congress.

=== Arrival in Alaska ===
When Wickersham set off for Alaska he was allegedly dodging a government posting in Japan, and he told anyone who asked that he preferred the Eagle post, saying he "yearned for the Yukon, not Yokohama". With the introduction of federal oversight Wickersham was one of three federally appointed judges. The other two were Arthur H. Noyes in Nome and the previously established Melville C. Brown in Juneau. This post made him one of the three most powerful people in Alaska, with no one within 3,000 miles to overrule his decisions or stand in his way. Wickersham was tasked with "cleaning up" the legal system after the Nome Gold Conspiracy which involved prominent Republican National Committee member Alexander McKenzie, and Judge Noyes. His start into Alaskan official law involved litigation of that reflected the Alaskan frontier spirit. "Chief Charley, head of the Charley River band of the Tena Indians, was the first litigant to appeal to the new court officials for justice." According to court records, someone from upriver had stolen his dog, considered a very serious offense at the time. After being given the run around, Chief Charley reached Wickersham and consulted the highest court in the land. Wickersham appointed a deputy to retrieve the stolen animal and waited with the chief for his return, chatting about everyday problems. This incident helped frame Wickersham's reputation as a "man of action."

Wickersham was the most powerful Federal employee overseeing the vast majority of the interior of Alaska. His relationship with the Fairbanks development helped shape the future of both Interior's steadily expanding city and the entire state. Wickersham's working relationship with Captain E.T. Barnette led to the initially small settlement developing into a city that became a gateway to the Arctic. Through Barnette and Wickersham's efforts, Fairbanks became incorporated.

Though they worked well together for the betterment of Alaska, and particularly the interior, they did not always have the best personal relationship. When presiding over one of Barnette's many gold claim cases, he concluded that if the case went in his favor, Wickersham could benefit from the decision himself after his term was over. "It was an outright bribe" quoted one historian. Personal opinions and ever changing allegiances aside, as far as the future of Fairbanks went, Barnette could always count on Wickersham to have his back as what Barnette wanted usually was what was best for Fairbanks. After Wickersham concluded his service as judge, he moved on to represent Alaska's interests in Washington.

=== Congressional delegate ===
Wickersham successfully ran for congressional delegate for the District of Alaska in 1908, beginning his term in 1909. In his first two terms as delegate, Wickersham focused on two aspects: territorial status for Alaska and trust-busting the Alaska Syndicate.

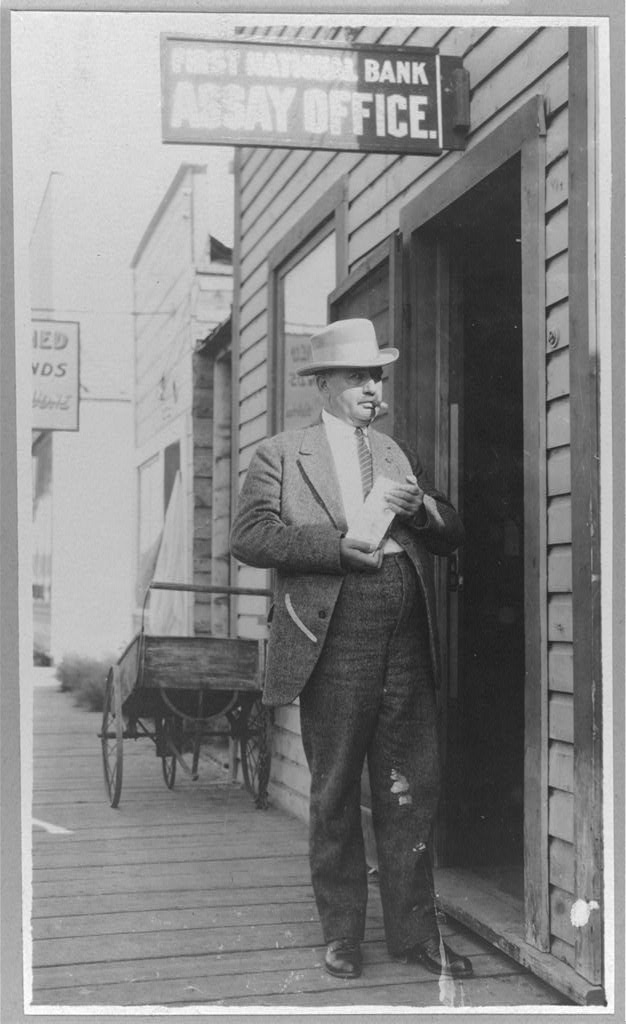
Photo of James Wickersham standing in front of a First National Bank Assay Office, holding a gold (?) brick, cigar in mouth.

The issue of home-rule in Alaska fell under the popular idea that Alaska had been neglected by the United States federal government since its purchase from Russia in 1867 and was denied any form of self-government. The first semblance of self-government came through the First Organic Act in 1884. This act stated (missing words) "…a governor, judge, attorney, clerk of court, marshal, four deputy marshals, and four commissioners, who were to function as justices of the peace." Mainly as a reaction to the huge population increase during the Klondike gold rush, these government offices were not voted in by Alaskans, but appointed by the president and confirmed by the Senate, each for a four-year term. This act also moved Alaska from simply a purchased piece of property ruled by the U.S. military to the status of District. However, the Organic Act of 1884 was only a start to government in Alaska and it still left the control of Alaska's resources to the federal government and largely, outside private interests.

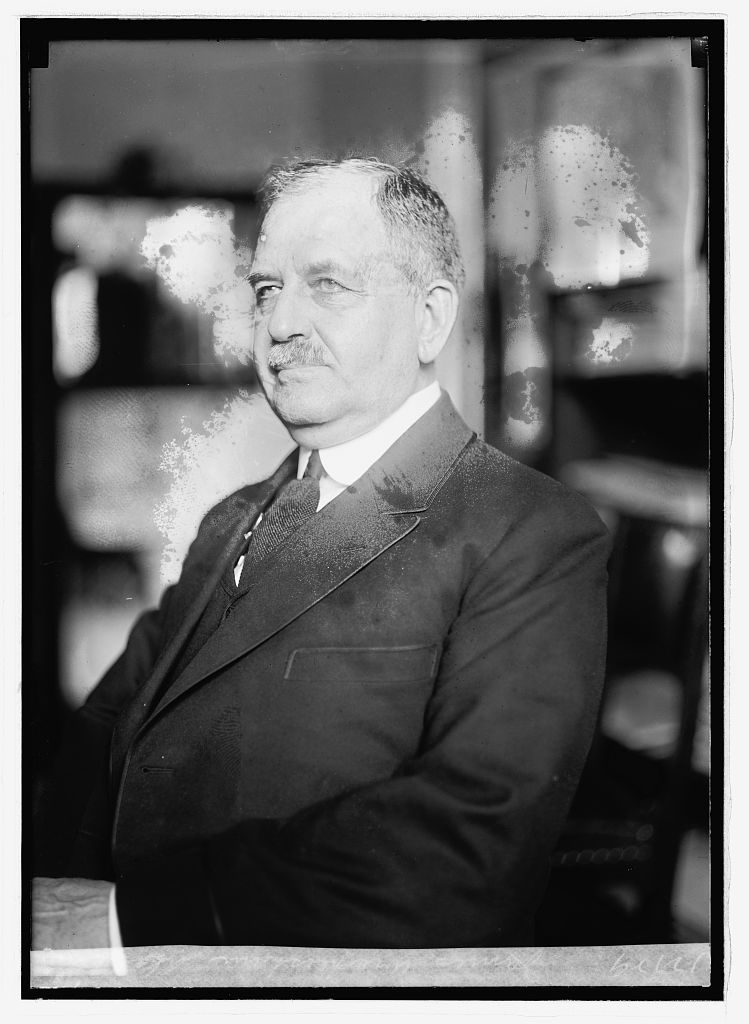
James Wickersham Portrait photo, 1921-1922

The Alaska Syndicate, a conglomeration of privately owned businesses headed by Guggenheim interests, represented outside rule of Alaska's resources. Their main focus was "…the development of copper holdings. It was for this purpose that it acquired and operated transportation lines." Thus, the Alaska Syndicate not only ruled the copper fields, but also the steamship lines that moved the copper back to the United States. When Wickersham became the Delegate for Alaska, he vowed to relinquish the Alaska Syndicate's hold on copper and transportation.

One of the first issues that caused the Alaska Syndicate and Wickersham to clash was over Wickersham's first attempt to create a territorial legislature in 1909. According to Wickersham's first bill as delegate, "it provided for a legislature of twenty-four members – eight in the Senate and sixteen in the House." However, President Taft believed that Alaska was not ready for territorial government and status. For the Alaska Syndicate, this brought relief. Those interested in Alaska's resources had opposed Wickersham due to the fear of taxation of their copper holdings if Alaska progressed to territorial status, or even worse, statehood.

Only two years later in Wickersham's second term as delegate, the home-rule bill passed as the Second Organic Act in 1912 establishing Alaska officially as a United States territory with a legislature. While Congress still maintained heavy control over the territory, it allowed Wickersham to move against the Alaska Syndicate. Continuing on the forward momentum of the Second Organic Act, Wickersham sought, "…congressional authorization for a federal railroad in Alaska.". While this again would bring more government control to Alaska, it did mean that the Guggenheim hold on transportation would be severely weakened. In order to see this bill passed in the Senate, Wickersham stood for over five hours delivering a speech to Congress, at that time the longest speech on record. His effort was not wasted and "the bill passed the Senate on January 24 by a vote of 46 to 16."

Wickersham would go on to serve several more terms as Alaska's delegate to Congress, his last term running from 1931-1933. In 1916, he initially lost his seat to Charles August Sulzer but successfully contested the election in the House arguing that the votes of several precincts were wrongly excluded and he then served the last two months of that term. In 1918, he again lost to Sulzer - by 33 votes - who subsequently died before being certified as the winner. Wickersham chose not to run in the June 1919 special to fill the seat, but after it was over, he contested the 1918 election on the grounds of numerous election irregularities such as ballots that should have been counted and unqualified voters. He again won his contest, this time by 37 votes, although the case took so long that he only served for 4 days before the term ended. Before Wickersham could be seated, Sulzer died and his seat was filled by George Barnes Grigsby in a special election that was subsequently voided. This makes him the only person to win a House seat via contest more than once.

Wickersham's service as Delegate began major political themes in Alaska's history that still hold today. Alaska exists on the paradoxical theory of demanding state rule over its resources and yet still incredibly dependent on the federal government largely through, presently, the investment of the Department of Defense. Wickersham's dilemma began this mindset of federal dependence because he saw that as a better alternative than having private interests and "Robber-Barons" ruling over Alaska's resources.

The Democratic nominee was a Fairbanks lawyer and one-time mayor, Thomas A. Marquam. "As the rally got underway, Judge Wickersham warmed to his subject and the walls of the Liberty Theatre virtually shook to the thunder of his denunciations. Most of his vituperation was couched in such eloquent language that the audience didn't know exactly what Marquam was being called — but by the tone they figured it was something pretty bad...It was years later that I found out that Judge Wickersham merely was calling Marquam a loud-talking Irishman."

— William R. Cashen (1914–1981), describing a 1926 campaign rally in Juneau where Wickersham spoke on behalf of Dan Sutherland

=== The 1903 Denali climb ===
Wickersham led the first recorded attempted climb of Denali, departing from Fairbanks May 16, 1903, on the *Tanana Chief* steamer with two mules, Mark and Hannah. Four companions who joined him on the trip: George Jeffrey, Mort Stevens, Charlie Web and John McLeod. To finance the venture, the men published the first Tanana region newspaper, "The Fairbanks Miner, Vol. 1, No.1, May, 1903", consisting of eight typewritten pages.

On the second day on the steamer, Wickersham's party discovered a boat drifting through the river ice flow. The team dubbed Wickersham the Admiral of the newly named Mudlark and used the boat to traverse the Kantishna River. By June 4, the excursion party had staked gold claims on Chitsia Creek, and, thanks to a map with description filed at Rampart, this led to larger prospecting for the Kantishna Mining.

The trip took a turn for the worse when the party came to an impassable mountain face. On June 20, Wickersham wrote in his diary, "...and [we] have reluctantly concluded there is no possible chance of further ascent from this side of Denali at this season--or any other season for that matter."

Even more defeating for the party was the wreck of their raft in a glacial stream on the descent that destroyed their food supply and equipment. Hungry, tired, and terrorized by mosquitoes, the group "happily ended the first attempt of white men...to scale the mighty walls of Denali."

The attempted climb of the mountain via Peters Glacier and the North Face is today called the "Harvard Route," having first been climbed successfully in 1963 by a team of seven mountaineers from Harvard University. The north face is generally called "Wickersham’s Wall".

=== Death and legacy ===
Wickersham was awarded a Doctor of Laws degree by the University of Alaska in 1935.

Wickersham died in Juneau, Alaska, on October 24, 1939, after a long illness, which culminated in a stroke. He was 82 years old at the time of his death. Funeral services were held in Juneau, with Wickersham's remains transported to Tacoma, Washington for cremation and internment of ashes in a family vault.

The city of Fairbanks has a Wickersham Street named in his honor during his lifetime.

Wickersham Dome, 3,207 feet, between Fairbanks and Livengood was named after the former judge and congressman. In 1960, Mount Wickersham in the Chugach Mountains was named after him.

== Works ==
- Old Yukon: Tales, Trails, and Trials. [1938] Fairbanks, AK: University of Alaska Press, 2009.

U.S. House of Representatives
| Preceded by Thomas Cale | Delegate to the U.S. House of Representatives from Alaska Territory; March 4, 1909 – March 3, 1917 | Succeeded by Charles August Sulzer |
| Preceded by Charles August Sulzer | Delegate to the U.S. House of Representatives from Alaska Territory; January 7, 1919 – March 3, 1919 | Succeeded by Charles August Sulzer |
| Preceded by George Barnes Grigsby | Delegate to the U.S. House of Representatives from Alaska Territory; March 1, 1921 – March 3, 1921 | Succeeded by Daniel Sutherland |
| Preceded by Daniel Sutherland | Delegate to the U.S. House of Representatives from Alaska Territory; March 4, 1931 – March 3, 1933 | Succeeded by Anthony Dimond |
