= George B. Grigsby =

American politician (1874–1962)

George Barnes Grigsby
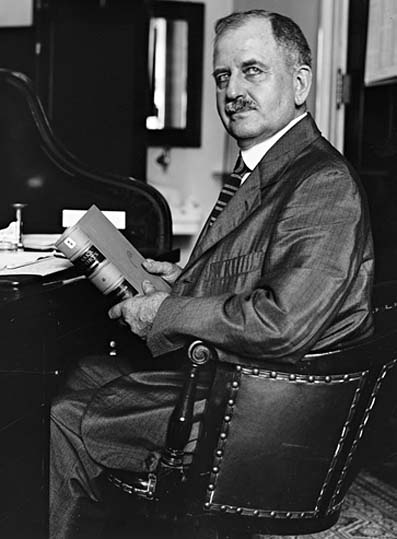
- Grigsby in 1920

Delegate to the U.S. House of Representatives from Alaska Territory's at-large district
- In office June 3, 1920 – March 1, 1921
- Preceded by: Charles August Sulzer
- Succeeded by: James Wickersham

Personal details
- Born: December 2, 1874 Sioux Falls, Dakota Territory, U.S.
- Died: May 9, 1962 (aged 87) Santa Rosa, California, U.S.
- Resting place: Golden Gate National Cemetery
- Party: Democratic
- Education: University of South Dakota
- Profession: Lawyer

Military service
- Allegiance: United States
- Branch/service: United States Army
- Years of service: 1898
- Rank: Lieutenant
- Unit: Third Regiment, United States Volunteer Cavalry
- Battles/wars: Spanish–American War

George Barnes Grigsby (December 2, 1874 – May 9, 1962) was a delegate to the United States House of Representatives from the Territory of Alaska.

== Early life and education ==
He was born in Sioux Falls, Dakota (now South Dakota), and was a son of Fannie (Kingsbury) Grigsby and Melvin Grigsby, a prominent South Dakota political and military leader. His siblings included Sioux K. Grigsby and John T. Grigsby, both of whom served as South Dakota's lieutenant governor. Grigsby attended the public schools, State University in Vermillion, South Dakota, and Sioux Falls University. He studied law, was admitted to the bar in 1896, and commenced practice in Sioux Falls, South Dakota.

== Career ==
George Grigsby was a delegate to the state Democratic convention in 1896. During the Spanish–American War, he served as a lieutenant in the Third Regiment, United States Volunteer Cavalry. He moved to Nome, Alaska, in 1902. He was an assistant United States attorney from 1902 to 1908 and a United States attorney from 1908 to 1910. He was the city attorney of Nome in 1911 and the mayor in 1914. In 1915, he was a member of the board of commissioners for the promotion of uniform legislation. He was elected the first attorney general in 1916, and he resigned in 1919.

He presented his credentials as a Democratic Delegate-elect to the Sixty-sixth Congress to fill the vacancy caused by the death of Charles A. Sulzer. He served from June 3, 1920, to March 1, 1921, when he was succeeded by James Wickersham, who had contested the election of Charles Sulzer in the first instance and contested against George Grigsby. He was a delegate to the Democratic National Convention in 1920 and 1924. He engaged in the practice of law in Ketchikan, Juneau, and Anchorage, Alaska.

== Death ==
He died on May 9, 1962, in Santa Rosa, California. He was interred in Golden Gate National Cemetery in San Bruno, California.

== Sources ==
- United States Congress. "George B. Grigsby (id: G000474)". Biographical Directory of the United States Congress.

U.S. House of Representatives
Preceded by Charles August Sulzer	Delegate to the U.S. House of Representatives from Alaska Territory; June 3, 1920 – March 1, 1921	Succeeded by James Wickersham
