= Charles A. Sulzer =

American politician (1879–1919)

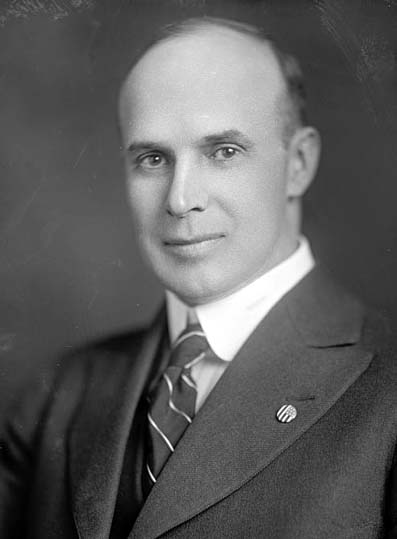
- Sulzer, 1905–1919

Delegate to the U.S. House of Representatives from Alaska Territory's at-large district
- In office March 4, 1919 – April 15, 1919
- Preceded by: James Wickersham
- Succeeded by: George Barnes Grigsby
- In office March 4, 1917 – January 7, 1919
- Preceded by: James Wickersham
- Succeeded by: James Wickersham

Personal details
- Born: Charles August Sulzer; February 24, 1879 Roselle, New Jersey, U.S.
- Died: April 15, 1919 (aged 40) Aboard a boat between Sulzer, Alaska and Ketchikan, Alaska, U.S.
- Resting place: Evergreen Cemetery, Hillside, New Jersey
- Party: Democratic
- Relations: William Sulzer (brother)
- Education: United States Military Academy

Military service
- Allegiance: United States
- Branch/service: United States Army
- Years of service: 1898
- Unit: Fourth Regiment, New Jersey Volunteer Infantry
- Battles/wars: Spanish–American War

Charles August Sulzer (February 24, 1879 – April 15, 1919) was a veteran of the Spanish-American War veteran who served as a delegate to the United States House of Representatives from the Territory of Alaska from 1917 to 1919.

== Life and career ==
Sulzer was born on February 24, 1879, in Roselle, New Jersey in Union County, the son of Lydia (Jelleme), who was Frisian, and Thomas Sulzer, a German immigrant. He attended the public schools, Pingry School in Elizabeth, New Jersey, Berkeley Academy in New York City, and the United States Military Academy at West Point, New York.

=== Spanish-American War ===
During the Spanish–American War, he served with the Fourth Regiment, New Jersey Volunteer Infantry.

After the war, Charles Sulzer moved to Alaska in 1902 and engaged in mining.

=== Congress ===
He was a member of the Alaska Territorial Senate in 1914. He presented his credentials as a Democratic delegate-elect to the Sixty-fifth Congress and served from March 4, 1917, to January 7, 1919, when he was succeeded by James Wickersham, who had contested his election. He later presented his credentials as a Delegate-elect to the Sixty-sixth Congress and served from March 4, 1919, until his death on April 15, 1919, before the convening of Congress.

=== Death and burial ===
According to published accounts on April 16, Sulzer took ill in Sulzer and died aboard a boat while en route to a hospital in Ketchikan. He was interred in Evergreen Cemetery in Hillside, New Jersey.

=== Family ===
His brother, William Sulzer, was also a congressman and a governor of New York.

== See also ==
- List of members of the United States Congress who died in office (1900-1949)

== Sources ==
- United States Congress. "Charles A. Sulzer (id: S001064)". Biographical Directory of the United States Congress.

U.S. House of Representatives
Preceded by James Wickersham	Delegate to the U.S. House of Representatives from Alaska Territory; March 4, 1917 – January 7, 1919	Succeeded by James Wickersham
Preceded by James Wickersham	Delegate to the U.S. House of Representatives from Alaska Territory; March 4, 1919 – April 15, 1919	Succeeded by George Barnes Grigsby
