= Clifton A. Woodrum =

American politician (1887–1950)

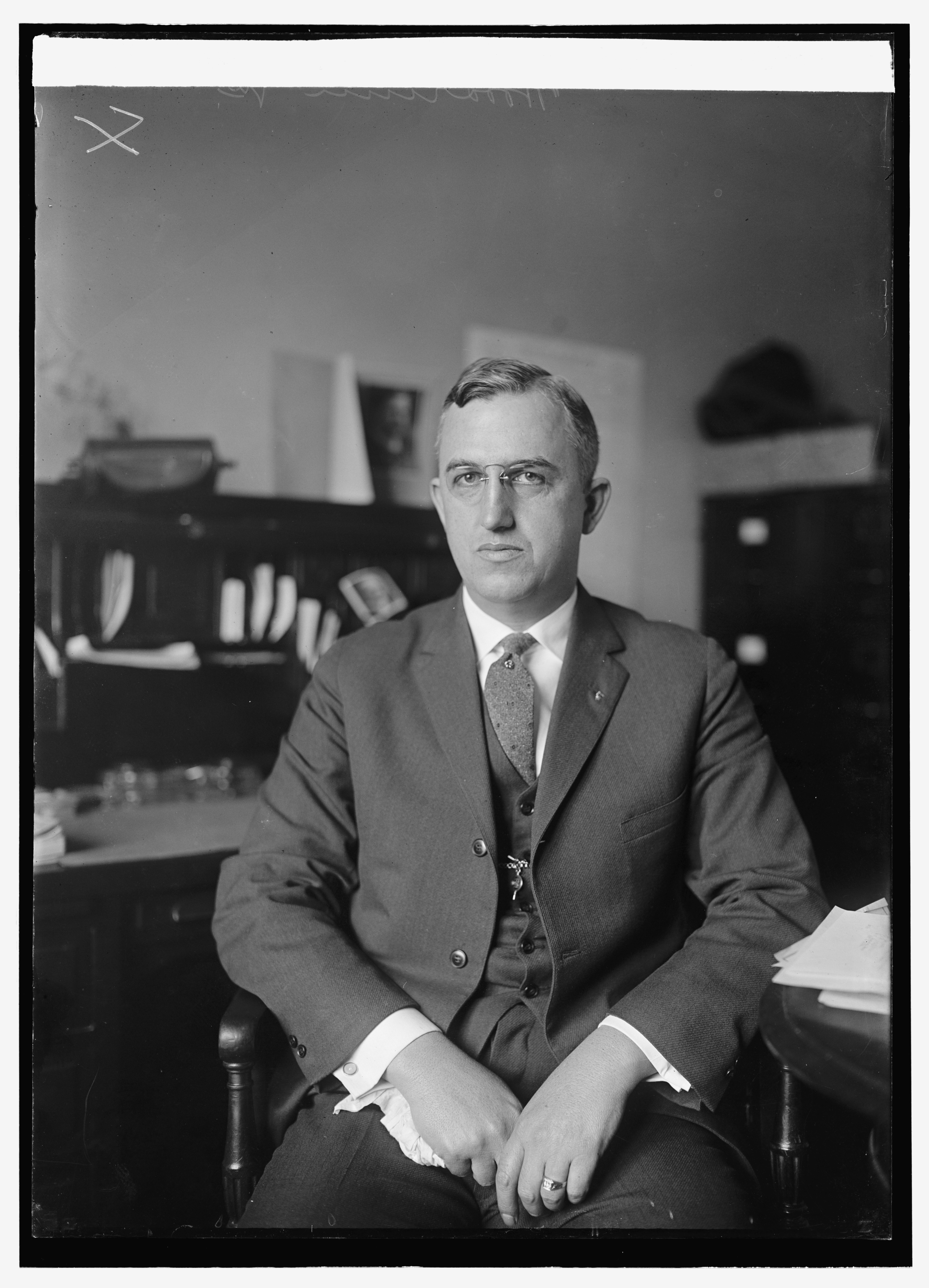
- Woodrum in 1923. National Photo Company Collection, Library of Congress.

Member of the U.S. House of Representatives from Virginia's 6th district
- In office March 4, 1923 – December 31, 1945 at-large: March 4, 1933 – January 3, 1935
- Preceded by: James P. Woods
- Succeeded by: J. Lindsay Almond

Commonwealth's Attorney for Roanoke
- In office January 1, 1918 – September 1, 1919
- Preceded by: Everett Perkins
- Succeeded by: Samuel R. Price

Personal details
- Born: Clifton Alexander Woodrum; April 27, 1887 Roanoke, Virginia, U.S.
- Died: October 6, 1950 (aged 63) Washington, D.C., U.S.
- Party: Democratic
- Education: University College of Medicine; Washington and Lee University
- Profession: Pharmacist, Lawyer

Clifton Alexander Woodrum (April 27, 1887 – October 6, 1950) was a Virginia pharmacist, lawyer and U.S. Representative from Roanoke who was considered a Progressive Democrat for his support of President Franklin D. Roosevelt. However, his later leadership in the Economy Bloc and support for cuts and restrictions in the Emergency Relief Appropriation Act of 1939 strained his relationship with Roosevelt and cost him the president's backing for advancement in the House.

== Early and family life ==
Born in Roanoke, Virginia, to Robert H. and Anna T. Woodrum, years after his brother Robert J. Woodrum and sister Claudine J. Woodrum, Clifton Woodrum attended the local public schools. He later attended the University College of Medicine (now combined with the Medical College of Virginia) in Richmond, Virginia. He married Martha Lena Woodrum, formerly of Texas. They had a son, Clifton A. Woodrum Jr. (1910–1959), and a daughter, Martha Anne Woodrum Zillhardt (1916–2002).

== Careers ==
Woodrum became a registered pharmacist and engaged in his profession in Roanoke. He also followed his father's example, studied law at Washington and Lee University, Lexington, Virginia, and was admitted to the bar in 1908 and commenced practice in Roanoke, Virginia. His father had been Roanoke's first elected Commonwealth's Attorney, and he too served in that capacity, from 1917 to 1919. The Virginia General Assembly then elected Woodrum as a judge of the Roanoke's Hustings Court, where he served from 1919 to 1922.

Woodrum was elected as a Democrat to the Sixty-eighth Congress and re-elected eleven times. He served from March 4, 1923, until his resignation on October 24, 1945 (effective December 31, 1945), to become president of the American Plant Food Council, Inc. Considered a "Southern Progressive" in Washington, Woodrum bucked the powerful Senators Carter Glass and Harry F. Byrd and the Byrd Organization to become an ardent "New Dealer." As a member of the United States House Committee on Appropriations, he steered federal money for the purchase of land for Roanoke's airport, originally called "Woodrum's Field" in his honor, and today known as the Roanoke–Blacksburg Regional Airport. He was also instrumental in bringing the United States Department of Veterans Affairs hospital, now known as the Salem Veterans Affairs Medical Center to his district. The hospital brought many jobs to the region during the Great Depression.

Woodrum was a promoter of his state and region, and very fond of the song, "Carry Me Back to Old Virginny". The song was representative of the commonwealth in many ways. "When Clifton A, Woodrum was in Congress, the House of Representatives couldn't adjourn until the honorable Democrat from Roanoke, Virginia with a rich and varied baritone voice led the body in a rendition of "Carry Me Back to Old Virginny".

== Economy Bloc and the Emergency Relief Appropriation Act of 1939 ==
Although Woodrum supported most New Deal programs through 1936, he became a leader of the Economy Bloc, a group of Democrats and Republicans who sought to reduce federal spending. In 1937, he became acting chairman of the House Appropriations Committee's Deficiency Subcommittee which handled relief funding. He argued that recovery from the Great Depression should allow the government to reduce borrowing. He secured an amendment requiring the Works Progress Administration (WPA) to spread its funds across the fiscal year rather than seek more money to cover shortfalls. A recession led him to support Roosevelt's relief spending in 1938, but he renewed his campaign for cuts after a close reelection that fall.

In 1939 Woodrum worked with Republican representative John Taber to reduce Roosevelt's requests for relief funds. He also led a committee investigation of the WPA that focused on the Workers' Alliance of America, an organization representing unemployed people and WPA workers. During the hearings, Alliance president David Lasser denied being a Communist while secretary/treasurer Herbert Benjamin acknowledged his Communist Party membership.

Woodrum used these ties to support his criticism of the relief program. US Rep. Clarence Cannon challenged the investigation's methods and noted that the committee had not shown that the Alliance controlled the WPA.

Woodrum helped shape the Emergency Relief Appropriation Act of 1939, also called the Woodrum Act, which funded relief programs for fiscal year 1940. WPA budget was cut by $773 millionand the number of jobs reduced from about 3.35 million to 2 million. It required a 130 hour work month, reducing hourly pay for workers who had earned their monthly income in fewer hours. It also required many employees to leave WPA jobs after 18 months of service. Roosevelt signed the law while objecting to some of its restrictions.

The changes sparked strikes and demonstrations across the country during July 1939. The Workers' Alliance protested the cuts, but congress adjourned without reversing them. Woodrum's leadership increased his standing among supporters of spending cuts but damaged his relationship with Roosevelt. Without the president's backing Woodrum's political future was limited.

== Death and legacy ==
Woodrum died of a heart attack in Washington, D.C., October 6, 1950. He was interred in Fairview Cemetery, Roanoke, Virginia. His son and namesake also became a lawyer in Roanoke, but only survived him by 9 years. His grandson Chip Woodrum continued the family tradition of opposing the Byrd organization, and served in the Virginia House of Delegates, where he became known (among other accomplishments) for updating Virginia's Freedom of Information Act.

The Roanoke-Blacksburg Regional/Woodrum Field Airport (ROA) was activated in May 1930 due to the efforts of Rep. Woodrum to acquire the land and build the facility. It is named in his honor. He was also influential in getting the airport passed as "National Defense Project", opening it up to government funding for improvements. Unbeknownst to Woodrum, his daughter, Martha Ann Woodrum, took flying lessons and became a pilot, as the father did later.

Rep. Woodrum was also instrumental in bringing the Salem Veterans Affairs Medical Center to his district in 1934.

== Electoral history ==
- 1922; Woodrum was elected to the U.S. House of Representatives with 77.95% of the vote, defeating Republican Fred W. McWane.
- 1924; Woodrum was re-elected with 69.01% of the vote, defeating Republican McWane.
- 1926; Woodrum was re-elected unopposed.
- 1928; Woodrum was re-elected unopposed.
- 1930; Woodrum was re-elected unopposed.
- 1932; Woodrum was re-elected along with the Democratic slate in the at-large district; he won 8.39% of the vote in a 24-way race.
- 1934; Woodrum was re-elected with 67.14% of the vote, defeating Republican Thomas J. Wilson Jr., Socialist W.L. Gibson, and Independent John Moffett Robinson.
- 1936; Woodrum was re-elected with 60.69% of the vote, defeating Republican T.X. Parsons.
- 1938; Woodrum was re-elected with 55.89% of the vote, defeating Republican McWane.
- 1940; Woodrum was re-elected with 68.14% of the vote, defeating Republican McWane and Socialist Lawrence S. Wilkes.
- 1942; Woodrum was re-elected with 93.56% of the vote, defeating Republican Stephen A. Moore.
- 1944; Woodrum was re-elected 69.09% of the vote, defeating Republican John Strickler.

== Sources ==
U.S. House of Representatives
Preceded by James P. Woods	Member of the U.S. House of Representatives from Virginia's 6th congressional district 1923–1933	Succeeded by District abolished Himself after district re-established in 1935
Preceded by District re-established John S. Wise before district abolished in 1885	Member of the U.S. House of Representatives from Virginia's at-large congressional seat 1933–1935	Succeeded by District abolished
Preceded by District re-established Himself before district abolished in 1933	Member of the U.S. House of Representatives from Virginia's 6th congressional district 1935–1945	Succeeded by J. Lindsay Almond
