= Works Progress Administration strikes of 1939 =

1939 labor strike and protest in the United States

Works Progress Administration Strikes of 1939
- Part of the Great Depression
- Executive Committee of the U.S. Conference of Mayors surveying the strikes of WPA employees throughout the country
- Date: July 5–21, 1939
- Location: United States
- Methods: Strikes, Protest, Demonstrations

Parties
Workers Alliance of America; American Federation of Labor	Federal Bureau of Investigation; Minneapolis Police Department

Lead figures
David Lasser	Clifton A. Woodrum; Linus C. Glotzbach

Casualties and losses
Injuries: 24; Fatalities: 1 striker; Arrests: 162 people indicted; 32 received sentences	Fatalities:

The Works Progress Administration strikes of 1939 were a series of work stoppages across the United States in July 1939. Workers protested cuts to federal work relief and a law that increased their work hours without raising their monthly pay. The strikes failed to overturn the law. In Minnesota, the conflict led to a police shooting resulting in the death of one person, and federal prosecutions of strikers. Minnesota was the only state where striking workers faced criminal charges for preventing people from working.

== Background ==
President Franklin D. Roosevelt created the Works Progress Administration (WPA) in 1935 to provide jobs for people who could not find work during the Great Depression. The agency employed millions of Americans. In 1939, its name changed to the Work Projects Administration, though it kept the initials WPA.

=== Emergency Relief Appropriation Act of 1939 ===
The Emergency Relief Appropriation Act of 1939, also called the Woodrum Act, after Virginia Congressman Clifton A. Woodrum, took effect on July 1, 1939. Under the Woodrum Act the WPA budget was cut by $773 million and the number of jobs reduced from about 3.35 million to 2 million. It also required workers to put in 130 hours a month. Workers who had earned their monthly pay in fewer hours, the change amounted to a cut in hourly wages. The law also required many workers to leave WPA jobs after 18 months of service, with no guarantee that they could return after the waiting period.

== Causes ==
Virginia congressman Clifton A. Woodrum helped lead the Economy Bloc, a conservative coalition of southern Democrats and many Republicans who wanted to cut federal spending. Earlier Woodrum had supported most New Deal programs, but by 1937 he argued the government should reduce borrowing and relief spending. A tough reelection in 1938 where his Republican opponent attacked Woodrum's "New Dealism," strengthened his push for cuts. Woodrum's position on the House Appropriations Committee gave him influence over WPA funding. The Workers Alliance of America, a political organization which represented unemployed people and WPA workers were furious and called WPA cuts "Woodrumed" and hanged House Appropriations Committee members in effigy.

In 1939 Woodrum linked his campaign against relief spending to charges of Communist influence in the Workers Alliance of America. His committee questioned Alliance leaders about their political beliefs. The hearings helped discredit the organization, though investigators did not show that it controlled the WPA. This campaign helped build support for cuts and restrictions on work relief.

== Nationwide walkouts and protests ==
The law instigated strikes across the country. The American Federation of Labor and the Workers Alliance helped organize opposition to the change in hours and pay. Estimates of participation differ. The New York Times assessed the number of WPA strikers country wide at between 100,000 and 125,000 while the Northwest Organizer weekly labor newspaper estimated the number at 500,000.

The strikes placed workers in conflict with the administration that had created the WPA. Roosevelt opposed their attempt to strike against the government. The American Federation of Labor later withdrew its support for the walkouts, and most WPA workers across the country returned to work by July 18.

The Workers’ Alliance fought the WPA cuts. In April and May 1939, its newspaper, Work, attacked lawmakers who sought to balance the budget by cutting relief. The Alliance organized a Right to Work Congress in Washington, D.C., from June 3 to 10. About 1,000 delegates attended as the House debated the relief bill. Eleanor Roosevelt spoke at the gathering, but President Roosevelt declined to send greetings or meet with Alliance president David Lasser about the bill.

== Strike in Minnesota ==
Protests in Minneapolis had begun before the law took effect. Early in 1939, WPA officials dismissed more than 900 women, arguing that they could receive Aid to Dependent Children. Many could not qualify or faced a gap in income while waiting for approval. In May1,500 workers voted for a 1 day strike. On June 2, more than 5,000 people marched to the Minneapolis WPA office to demand the return of dismissed workers and more funding for jobs. The protesters were unable to win those demands.

By July 5, about 13,350 workers were on strike in Minneapolis and St. Paul. Participants included plumbers, electricians, sewing workers, library workers, and musicians.

On July 6, WPA administrator Linus C. Glotzbach declared all workers not back on their jobs on Monday morning July 10, would lose their jobs. He said replacements would come from the lists of people eligible for relief work. The threat did not end the strike. On July 10 officials reported that 90 percent of WPA projects in Minneapolis and 50 percent in St. Paul remained closed.

Picketers gathered at job sites, sometimes blocking entrances to prevent others from working. A brawl broke out on July 10 at a WPA sewing project at 123 North Second Street in Minneapolis when several policemen escorted nonstrikers through a crowd of picketers, which closed the project for five days.

Newspapers reported that the death of a policeman a few hours later was connected with the disorder. Later, however the coroner issued a statement that he died from a long-term heart condition. The blows he received during the strike clash did not contribute to his fatal heart attack.

On July 12, a fight broke out at the University of Minnesota research project office at 200 Southeast Harvard Street. Picketers gathered at the entrance as nonstriking workers arrived in the morning and late afternoon. A nonstriking worker made a knife during his lunch break and carried it as he left. During the fight, he stabbed one striking picketer and cut another's hand.

Then on July 14, a battle erupted again at the WPA sewing project site. A crowd of about 3,000 had gathered on the site. Roughly 200 nonstriking workers entered the building in the morning without trouble, but as they were about to leave at 7 pm Police, seemingly unprovoked, fired into the crowd, killing one relief recipient and injuring 24 people.

== Aftermath ==
Hands upraised to show how they are handcuffed, WPA strike defendants are marched from Jail to federal court in order to enter not guilty pleas

The Minnesota strike ended July 21, 1939, without reversing the cuts to WPA jobs or changes in pay and hours. Most workers who had been laid off or fired returned to work or received other assignments. But the dispute continued through FBI investigations and federal trials. Minnesota was the only state where WPA strikers faced federal prosecution for blocking others from working.

=== FBI investigations ===
Federal Bureau of Investigation agents collected evidence during the strike. According to a July 24 report in the Minneapolis Tribune, about 25 agents dressed as workers had mixed with picketers at the Minneapolis sewing project where police had fired into the crowd.

Prosecutors from the U.S. attorney’s office asked people with information about the strike to contact either office or the FBI. A House committee also gathered the names and political ties of WPA protesters without their knowledge. Some Twin Cities strikers later lost access to WPA jobs because of this effort.

=== Federal prosecutions ===
Officials indicted 162 people on August 18. More than a 100 were charged under Section 28 of the relief law, which banned the use of force, threats, or intimidation to keep someone from receiving relief benefits. Prosecutors also brought conspiracy charges, accusing strikers of planning to break the law together. Defendants were tried in groups, not individually according to the date and place of the alleged misconduct.

On July 14, President Roosevelt said, "You cannot strike against the government." However no federal law at the time banned strikes by federal employees. Judge Matthew Joyce, who presided over all the WPA trials recognized the right to strike and to picket without violence. The charges consequently focused on the strikers' conduct, not the act of leaving work.

Unions raised most of the more than $25,000 spent on the defense. Critics argued that the group trials, the excessive bail amounts, and the conspiracy charges threatened workers' rights. Rep. Lee E. Geyer of California speech in congress denounced the WPA mass trials as an "attempt to destroy the civil rights of labor, to persecute American citizens, and to further the political advantage of certain individuals and groups."

Supporters of the defendants also questioned why the government prosecuted Twin Cities strikers but not those involved in disputes elsewhere.

=== Sentences and dismissals ===
32 defendants received sentences: 17 received suspended sentences and probation, while 15 received prison terms ranging from 30 days to 8 months. The defense did not appeal because the labor movement could not afford the cost.

Two months after the third trial ended, the Justice Department moved to dismiss 120 of the 125 cases still pending. Five defendants entered pleas of no contest to one charge each, and prosecutors dropped remaining conspiracy charges. In a statement read in court the government asked to drop the charges because President Roosevelt believed the defendants had "learned their lesson" that "they have no right to conduct a strike or engage in acts of violence."
