= John Sines Jr. =

American country music singer-songwriter (born 1968)

John Sines Jr
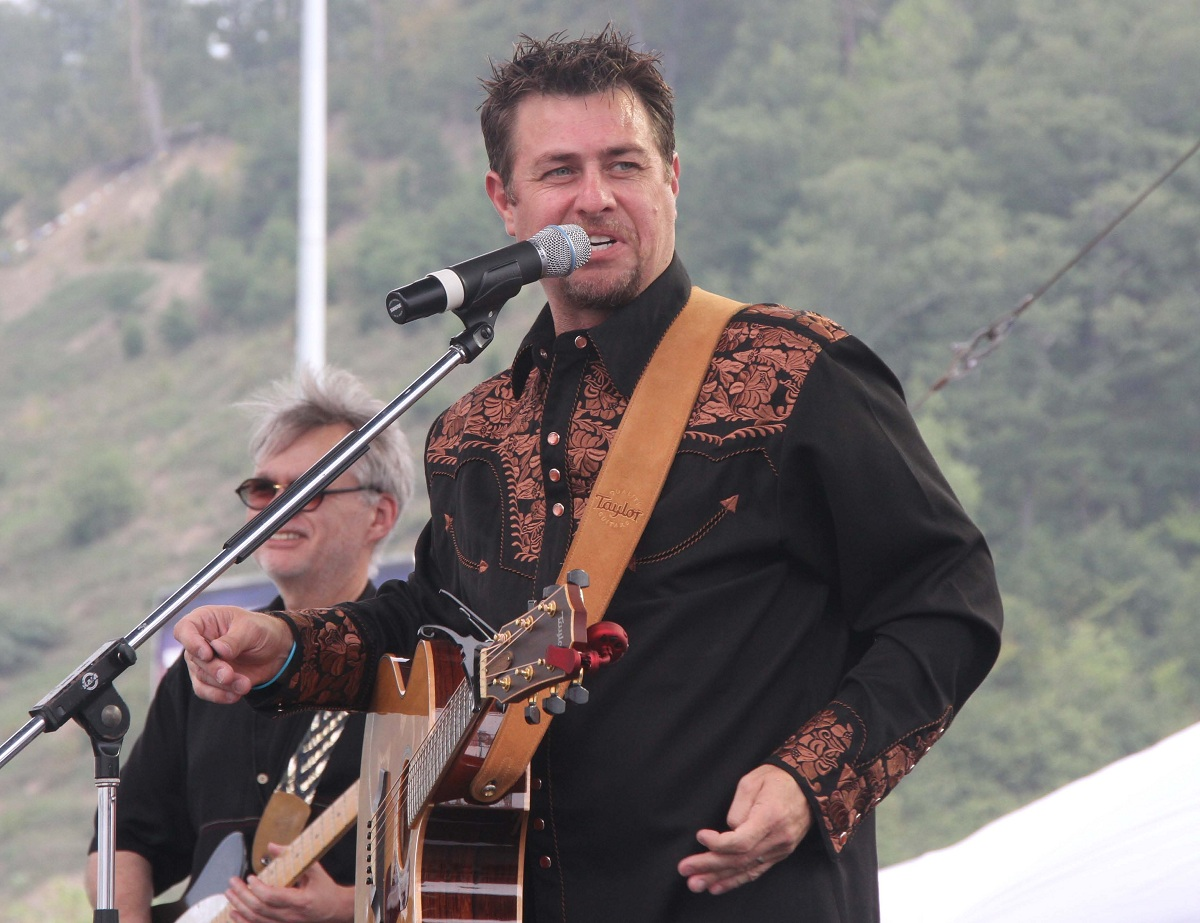
- John Sines Jr in concert August 2011

Background information
- Born: John Barry Sines Jr; October 15, 1968 (age 58)
- Origin: Bedford, Virginia, United States
- Genre: Country
- Occupation: Singer-songwriter
- Instruments: Vocals, guitar
- Years active: 1984–present
- Labels: OMAR Records; Music Row-Nashville; America's New Artist; Blaze Records; Majors Recording
- Formerly of: The Country Adjustment Band
- Website: http://johnsinesjr.com

John Barry Sines Jr (born October 15, 1968 in Bedford, Virginia) is an American country music singer-songwriter.

== Biography ==
John Sines Jr was born and raised in Bedford, Virginia. His father, John Sines Sr and his mother Sandra Bryant performed locally as country musicians and influenced him to begin playing music as well. Sines learned to play guitar and started writing songs at the age of 14. Sines started The Country Adjustment Band while in high school with his brother Sammie Sines. He has four sisters, Rhonda May Long, Brandy Sines, Crystal Sines and McKenzie Sines. He married Patricia Stinnett in 1988 and they have three children, Jonathan Sines, Zachary Sines and Savannah Sines. Sines currently performs as a Christian artist, advocating the cause of Christ.

== Musical career ==
=== 1984: The Country Adjustment Band ===
In April 1984 he founded The Country Adjustment Band in Goode, Virginia, with original members, his brother Sammie Sines & George Marshall. In the early 1990s, band members had changed and the group recorded their first project "Crazy 'Bout Country" in a tobacco barn in Brookneal, Virginia. By 1994 the band had recorded their second project "Barstools & Guitars". By 1998, he shifted from a band effort to a solo career.

=== 2001: The Black No. 3 (A tribute to Dale Earnhardt) ===
On February 19, 2001, he wrote "The Black #3 (A tribute to Dale Earnhardt)", the day after Earnhardt's death. On March 3, 2001, the song was recorded in Nashville, Tennessee, on America's New Artist record label. Sines was then signed to Music Row – Nashville & his CD would be distributed by Select-O-Hits out of Memphis, Tennessee, on April 17, 2001. A music video for "The Black #3" (A tribute to Dale Earnhardt was released and appeared on Great American Country Television. Sines appeared in the August 7, 2001, print issue of Country Weekly as one of many country artist paying tribute to Dale Earnhardt. He appeared in Country Music Live along with the team that created the music video for the Dale Earnhardt tribute. Sines had 4 national releases off this project, "The horse that they rode in on", "All she left me was alone", "The Black #3" (A tribute to Dale Earnhardt) & "keep loving this one". Sines appeared on Music City 103.3 WKDF with Carl P Mayfield in March 2001 and was invited on air to join the P Team at 2001 NASCAR Busch Series inaugural Pepsi 300 was held April 14, 2001, at Nashville Superspeedway. He was invited to appear in June 2001 at Lupus 2001, in Orlando, Florida alongside of Marc Anthony, Lionel Richie, Howie Dorough and the Backstreet Boys to support the Dorough Lupus Foundation. In December 2002, he would be invited to appear with Sherman Hemsley on Carnival Cruise Lines.

=== 2006: Sines of Conviction ===
By 2006, he would write & record his first gospel CD and third studio project called "Sines of Conviction" recorded on his own label OMAR Records. Three songs were released nationally from this project and reached the independent charts in Christian country music. "The man behind the hammer" would be his first release and reached number four in 2007 and would be accompanied by a music video by the same name. His second release, "Live another day" would become his first number one single in August 2007. His third single "Blinded Eyes" also reached number one in December 2007. "Blinded Eyes" would also reach number one in Canada on Riverside Country in January & February 2008. He was nominated by the Inspirational Country Music Association (ICMA) for Male Vocalist of the Year in 2007. "Blinded Eyes" was nominated as Song of the Year by the ICMA in 2008. That same year the ICMA would also nominate him for Male Vocalist of the Year. Sines appeared on the cover of Powersource Magazine in August 2008. He also appeared on the nationally televised 13th Annual Inspirational Country Music Award Show (ICM's) on November 4, 2007 at the Acuff Theater in Nashville as an award presenter for 'Vocal Group of the Year' alongside of Laura Bryna and Sue Allan Cooper.

=== 2008: ALIVE ===
In 2008, he recorded a live cd called "ALIVE" at Staunton River High School in Moneta, Virginia. "Walking with Jesus" would be the only release from this project. A music video for "Waiting on You" was recorded in front of a live crowd at Cattle Annie's in Lynchburg, Virginia.

=== 2012: Better Days ===
In 2012 he completed "Better Days" and no singles was released. The CD includes "Sing, (In The Midnight Hour)", a song Sines wrote after hearing evangelist David Ring preach a sermon on Acts 16.

=== 2014: Sines of the Season ===
In 2014, Sines recorded his first Christmas cd, "Sines Of The Season".

=== Singles ===
Year	Single	Peak position PS Top 20	Album
February 2000	"The horse that they rode in on"	—	"The Black #3" – (A tribute to Dale Earnhardt)"
March 2001	"The Black #3" – (A tribute to Dale Earnhardt)"	—	"The Black #3" – (A tribute to Dale Earnhardt)"
August 2001	"All She Left Me Was Alone"	—	"The Black #3" – (A tribute to Dale Earnhardt)"
December 2001	"It's about the baby"	—	
August 2006	"The man behind the hammer"	4	"Sines of Conviction"
March 2007	"Live another day"	1	"Sines of Conviction"
August 2007	"Blinded Eyes"	1	"Sines of Conviction"
July 2009	"Walking with Jesus"	—	"ALIVE"
"—" denotes releases that did not chart

=== Music videos ===
Year	Single
2001	"The Black #3" – (A tribute to Dale Earnhardt)
2006	"The man behind the hammer"
2008	"Waitin' On You"

== Rock Pike Baptist Church ==
In June 2013 John became the pastor of Rock Pike Baptist Church in Forest, Virginia. He became an ordained minister in December 2013.

== Music ministry ==
Sines travels as an evangelist to promote the Gospel of Jesus Christ through music. He has worked with faith base related ministries "Victory Weekend Ministries" and "Racing with Jesus Ministries". Sines appeared on syndicated cable shows "HIS Country Music" in Gilroy, California & "WPRZ-FM Praise Gathering and Concert" on "Virginia Living Television". Sines performs annually for the Amherst County Sheriffs Department to assist the D.A.R.E program. He has also appeared to help raise awareness for FASASD, Families Affected by Fetal Alcohol Spectrum Disorder. Sines also lends his talents to assist families in need. Sines was invited to perform at Union Congregational Church in Rockville, Connecticut, to help Jacob's Well Coffeehouse celebrate their 20th year in the ministry.

== Controversy ==
In November 2015 Sines gained national media attention with Todd Starnes of the Fox News Channel after he refused to comply with a ban on religious music by the Salem Veterans Affairs Medical Center in Salem, Virginia. Sines was told that he could not sing religions songs during a scheduled performance for hospitalized veterans, which also got the attention of The Washington Post and Fox Business Network. The Salem VA quickly reversed the decision after complaints from employees and veterans.
