= James P. Woods =

American politician

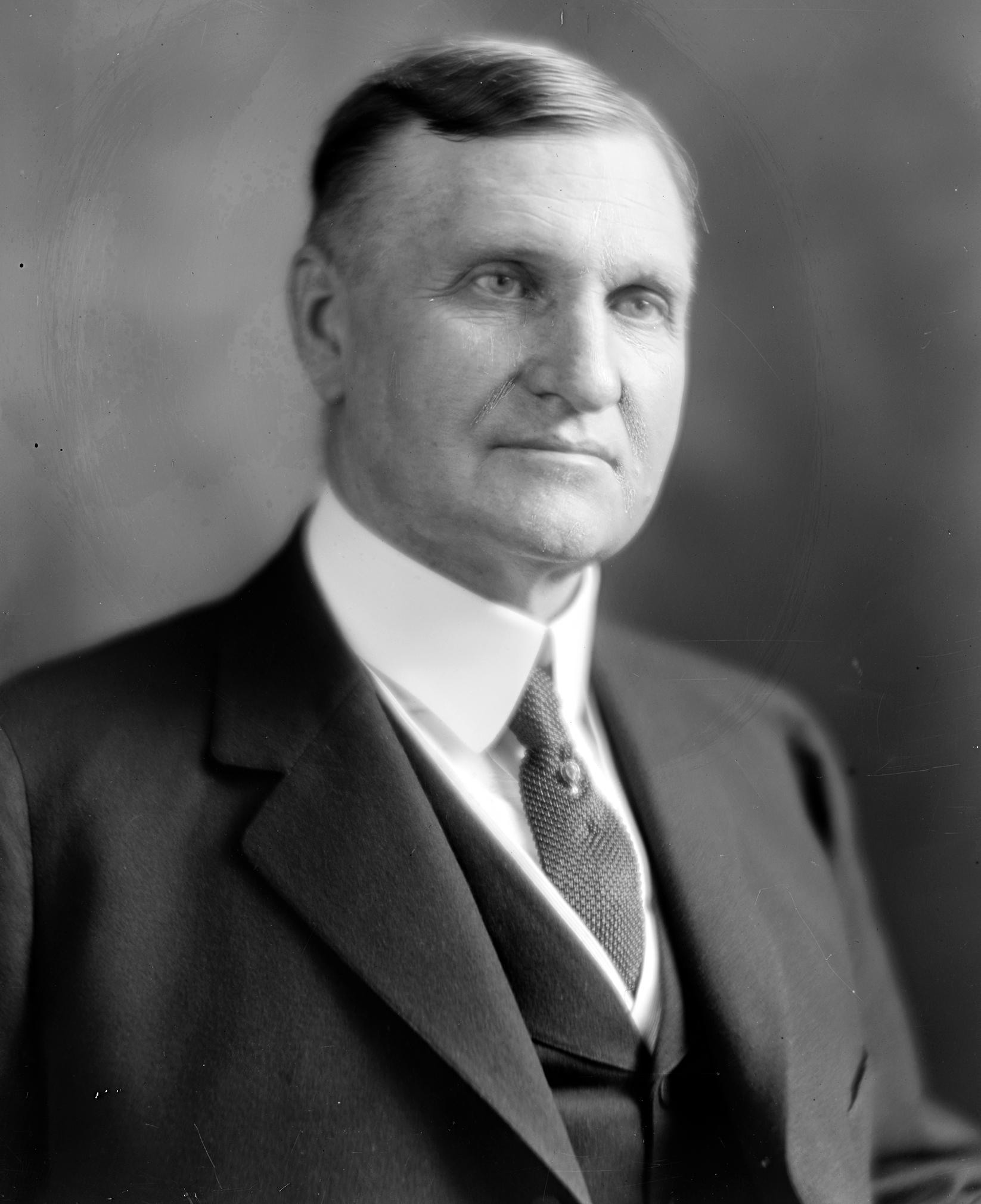

Member of the U.S. House of Representatives from Virginia's 6th district
- In office February 25, 1919 – March 3, 1923
- Preceded by: Carter Glass
- Succeeded by: Clifton A. Woodrum

Personal details
- Born: February 4, 1868 Catawba, Virginia, U.S.
- Died: July 7, 1948 (aged 80) Roanoke, Virginia, U.S.
- Party: Democratic Party
- Education: Roanoke College; University of Virginia
- Occupation: lawyer

James Pleasant Woods (February 4, 1868 – July 7, 1948) was a U.S. representative from Virginia.

== Biography ==
Born near Roanoke, Virginia, Woods attended the common schools. He graduated from Roanoke College in 1892. He was President of his class and a member of the Phi Gamma Delta fraternity. He studied law at the University of Virginia at Charlottesville in 1892 and 1893. Roanoke College conferred an honorary LLD degree in 1948. He was admitted to the bar in 1893 and commenced practice in Roanoke, Virginia. He was a member of the Roanoke City Council 1897–1898. He served as mayor of Roanoke 1898–1900.

Woods was elected as a Democrat to the Sixty-fifth and Sixty-sixth Congresses to fill the vacancies caused by the resignation of Carter Glass. He was reelected to the Sixty-seventh Congress and served from February 25, 1919, to March 3, 1923. He was an unsuccessful candidate for renomination in 1922. He served as delegate to the Democratic National Convention in 1920. He served as president and member of the board of trustees of Roanoke College for 31 years. He served as member of the board of trustees of the Randolph-Macon system of colleges. He was rector of the board of visitors of the Virginia Polytechnic Institute. He resumed the practice of law. He died at his home in Roanoke, Virginia, July 7, 1948. He was interred in Evergreen Burial Park.

== Electoral history ==
- 1918; Woods was elected to the U.S. House of Representatives in a special election with 88.24% of the vote, defeating Independent F.S. Layne.
- 1920; Woods was re-elected with 58.97% of the vote, defeating Republican William Doak.

== Sources ==
=== Further reading ===
- United States Congress. "James P. Woods (id: W000723)". Biographical Directory of the United States Congress.

U.S. House of Representatives
Preceded by Carter Glass	Member of the U.S. House of Representatives from Virginia's 6th congressional district 1919–1923	Succeeded by Clifton A. Woodrum
