= Carter Glass =

American politician (1858–1946)

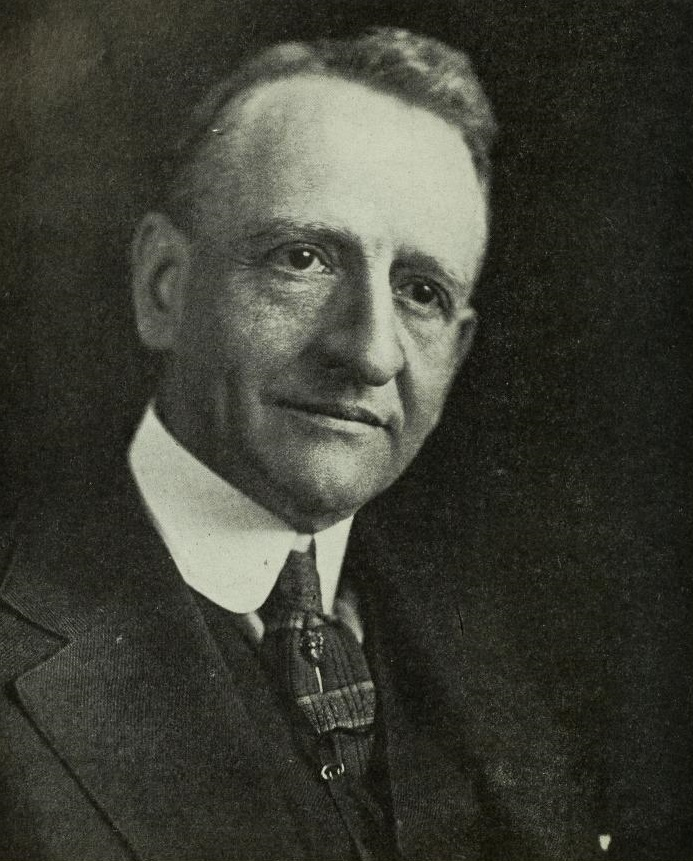
- Portrait of Glass, c. 1918

President pro tempore of the United States Senate
- In office July 11, 1941 – January 3, 1945
- Preceded by: Pat Harrison
- Succeeded by: Kenneth McKellar

United States Senator from Virginia
- In office February 2, 1920 – May 28, 1946
- Preceded by: Thomas S. Martin
- Succeeded by: Thomas G. Burch

Chair of the Senate Appropriations Committee
- In office March 4, 1933 – May 28, 1946
- Preceded by: Frederick Hale
- Succeeded by: Kenneth McKellar

47th United States Secretary of the Treasury
- In office December 16, 1918 – February 1, 1920
- President: Woodrow Wilson
- Preceded by: William McAdoo
- Succeeded by: David F. Houston

Chair of the House Banking Committee
- In office March 4, 1913 – December 16, 1918
- Preceded by: Arsène Pujo
- Succeeded by: Michael Francis Phelan

Member of the U.S. House of Representatives from Virginia's 6th district
- In office November 4, 1902 – December 16, 1918
- Preceded by: Peter J. Otey
- Succeeded by: James P. Woods

Member of the Virginia Senate from the 20th district
- In office December 6, 1899 – November 4, 1902
- Preceded by: Adam Clement
- Succeeded by: Don P. Halsey

Personal details
- Born: January 4, 1858 Lynchburg, Virginia, U.S.
- Died: May 28, 1946 (aged 88) Washington, D.C., U.S.
- Party: Democratic
- Spouse(s): Aurelia McDearmon Caldwell (m. 1886; died 1937) Mary Scott (m. 1940)
- Children: 4

Carter Glass (January 4, 1858 – May 28, 1946) was an American newspaper publisher and Democratic politician from Lynchburg, Virginia. He represented Virginia in both houses of Congress and served as the United States secretary of the treasury under President Woodrow Wilson. He played a major role in the establishment of the U.S. financial regulatory system, helping to establish the Federal Reserve System and the Federal Deposit Insurance Corporation.

After working as a newspaper editor and publisher, Glass won election to the Senate of Virginia in 1899. He was a delegate to the Virginia Constitutional Convention of 1902, where he was an influential advocate for segregationist policies. Historian J. Douglas Smith described him as “the architect of disenfranchisement in the Old Dominion.” He also promoted progressive fiscal and regulatory reform but these contributions were often superficial since Glass generally opposed the most reformist aspects of federal legislation and was a New Deal critic. Glass won election to the United States House of Representatives in 1902 and became Chairman of the House Committee on Banking and Currency in 1913. Working with President Wilson, he passed the Federal Reserve Act, which established a central banking system for the United States. Glass served as Secretary of the Treasury from 1918 until 1920, when he accepted an appointment to represent Virginia in the United States Senate. Glass was a favorite son candidate for the presidential nomination at the 1920 Democratic National Convention.

Glass was appointed to the Senate in 1920 and served until his death in 1946, becoming Chairman of the Senate Appropriations Committee in 1933. He also served as president pro tempore of the Senate from 1941 to 1945. He co-sponsored the 1933 Banking Act, also known as the Glass–Steagall Act, which created the Federal Deposit Insurance Corporation and enforced the separation of investment banking firms and commercial banks. An ardent supporter of states' rights, Glass opposed much of the New Deal and clashed with President Franklin D. Roosevelt over the control of federal appointments in Virginia.

== Early life and education ==
Carter Glass was born on January 4, 1858, in Lynchburg, Virginia, the last child born to Robert Henry Glass and his first wife, the former Augusta Elizabeth Christian. His mother died on January 15, 1860, when Carter was only two years old, so his sister Nannie, ten years older (and Elizabeth's only daughter), became his surrogate mother. Carter, a slight boy, got his nickname, "Pluck", for his pugnacious willingness to stand up to bullies.

His father, Robert Henry Glass, was Lynchburg's postmaster beginning in 1853, and in 1858 bought the Lynchburg Daily Republican newspaper (where he had worked since 1846). The city's other newspaper was the Lynchburg Daily Virginian, then published by Joseph Button, who on June 23, 1860, (while R. H. Glass was out of town) died in a duel with Glass's editor at the time, George W. Hardwicke, over accusations that Glass used his postal office to disadvantage the rival paper.

When the American Civil War (1861–1865) broke out, Lynchburg was pro-Union but also pro-slavery, since its economy depended on the manufacture of tobacco as well as slave-trading and the new railroads. R. H. Glass volunteered and joined the Virginia forces in 1861, and then joined the Confederate Army, where he became a major on the staff of Brigadier General John B. Floyd, a former Governor of Virginia. Major Glass ultimately remarried and had seven more children, including Meta Glass (president of Sweet Briar College) and Edward Christian Glass (Lynchburg's school superintendent for five decades).

In poverty-stricken Virginia during the post-War period, Glass received only a basic education at a private school run by one-legged former Confederate Henry L. Daviess. However, his father kept an extensive library. He became an apprentice printer to his father (and Hardwicke) when he was 13 years old, and continued his education through reading Plato, Edmund Burke and William Shakespeare, among others who stimulated his lifelong intellectual interest. He thought that Shakespeare's works were not written by William Shakespeare, refusing to accept that their author could have risen from humble origins. In 1876, Major Glass accepted an offer to edit the Petersburg News, and Carter joined him as a journeyman printer. Not long afterward, Major Glass accepted the editorship of the Danville Post, but Carter did not join him, instead returning to Lynchburg.

== Early career ==
When Glass was 19 years old, he moved with his father to Petersburg. However, when young Glass could not find a job as a newspaper reporter in Petersburg, he returned to Lynchburg, and went to work for former Confederate General (and future U.S. Senator) William Mahone's Atlantic, Mississippi and Ohio Railroad (AM&O), which was in receivership from 1877 to 1880. Glass was a clerk in the auditor's office at the railroad's headquarters. Several years later, under new owners and with headquarters relocated to Roanoke, the railroad became the Norfolk and Western (N&W). However, by then Glass had found the newspaper job he had initially wanted. His formative years as Virginia struggled to resolve a large pre-War debt (Mahone being a leading figure in the Readjuster Party) and dealing with boom-and-bust economic cycles (some linked with stock speculation), helped mold Glass' conservative fiscal thinking, much as it did many other Virginia political leaders of his era.

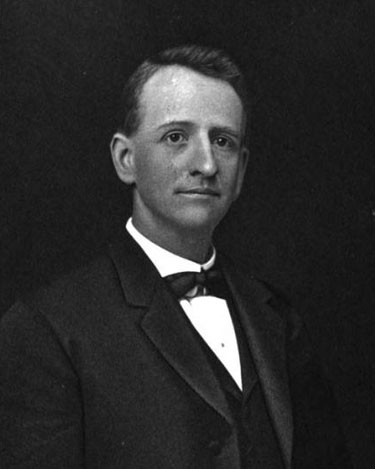
Lithographic portrait of Carter Glass as a young man

At the age of 22, Glass finally became a reporter, a job he had long sought, for the Lynchburg News. He rose to become the morning newspaper's editor by 1887. The following year, the publisher retired and offered Glass an option to purchase the business. Desperate to find financial backing, Glass received the unexpected assistance from a relative who loaned him enough for a $100 down payment on the $13,000 deal. Free to write and publish whatever he wished, Glass wrote bold editorials and encouraged tougher reporting in the morning paper, which increased sales. Soon, Glass was able to acquire the afternoon Daily Advance, then to buy out the competing Daily Republican. Thus he became Lynchburg's sole newspaper publisher; the modern-day Lynchburg News and Advance is the successor publication to his newspapers.

== Entry into politics ==
As a prominent and respected newspaper editor, Glass often supported candidates who ran against Virginia's Democrats of the post-Reconstruction period, who he felt were promoting bad fiscal policy. In 1896, the same year his father died, Glass attended the Democratic National Convention as a delegate, and heard William Jennings Bryan speak. Glass was elected to the Senate of Virginia in 1899, and was a delegate to the Virginia constitutional convention of 1901–1902. He was one of the most influential members of the convention, which instituted measures associated with the Progressive movement, such as the establishment of the State Corporation Commission to regulate railroads and other corporations, replacing the former Virginia Board of Public Works.

== Advocacy of segregation and disenfranchisement ==
The 1902 Constitution required that to be eligible to vote a man prove that he had paid a poll tax of US$1.50 (equivalent to about $54 in 2025) in each of the past three years, making voting a luxury. The Constitution also required that voters pass a literacy test with their performance graded by the registrar. When questioned as to whether these measures were potentially discriminatory, Glass exclaimed, "Discrimination! Why that is exactly what we propose. To remove every negro voter who can be gotten rid of, legally, without materially impairing the numerical strength of the white electorate." Indeed, the number of African-Americans qualified to vote dropped from 147,000 to 21,000 immediately. Carter Glass remained one of the strongest advocates of segregation and continued to dedicate much of his political career to the perpetuation of Jim Crow laws in the South.

== Congress, Secretary of the Treasury ==
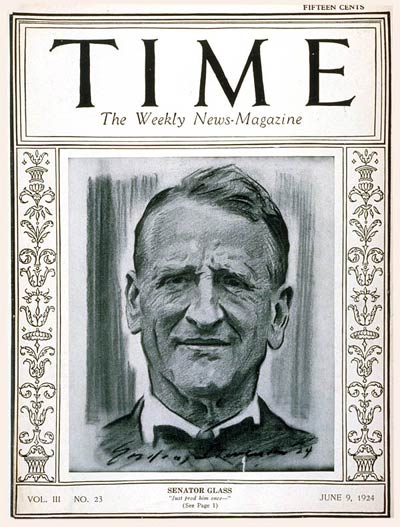

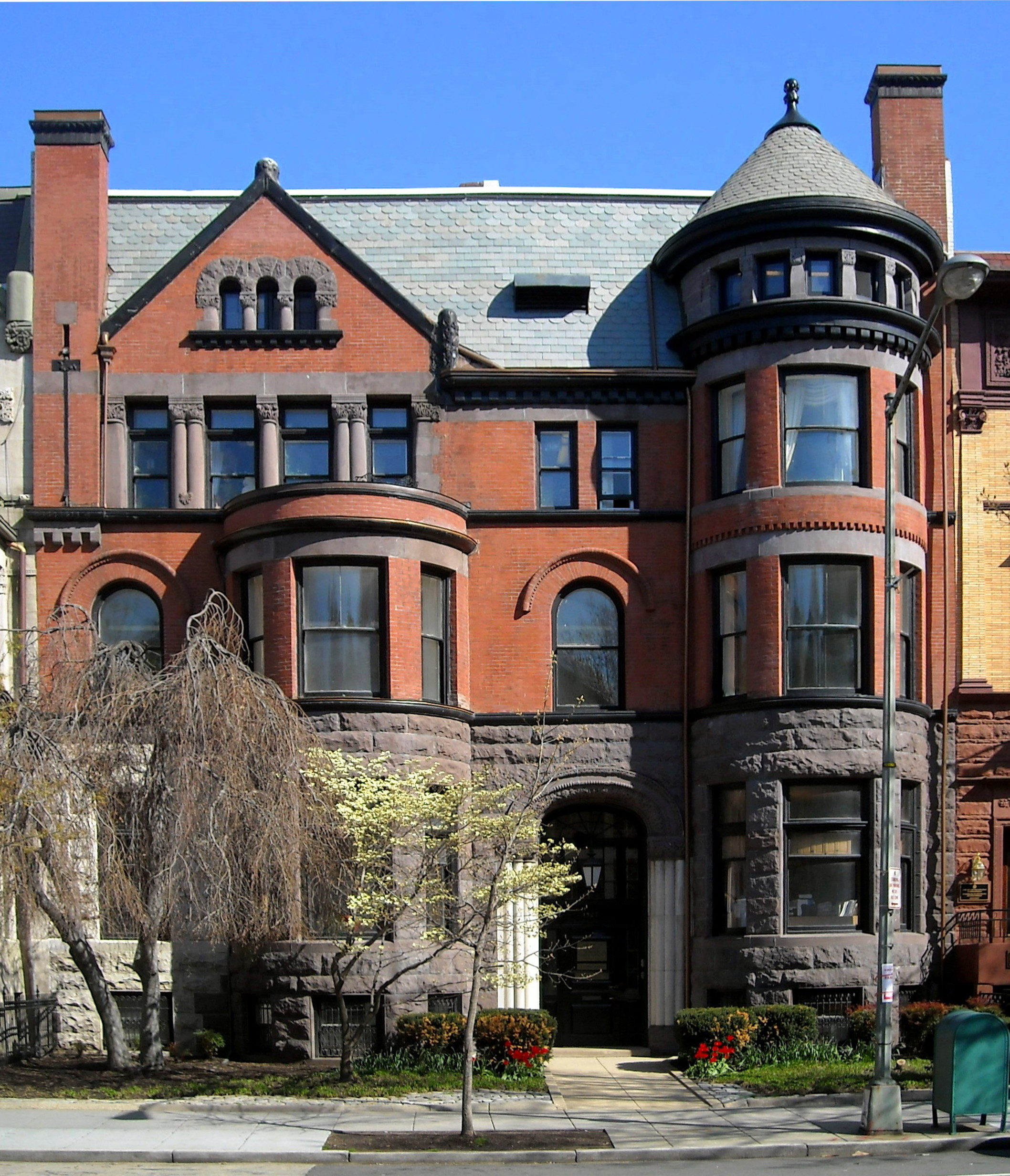
Glass's former residence, in the Dupont Circle neighborhood of Washington, D.C.

Glass was elected to the United States House of Representatives as a Democrat in 1902, to fill a vacancy. In 1913, he became Chairman of the House Committee on Banking and Currency, where he worked with President Woodrow Wilson to pass the Glass-Owen Federal Reserve Act. In 1918, Wilson appointed him Secretary of the Treasury, succeeding William Gibbs McAdoo. His signature as Secretary of the Treasury can be found on series 1914 Federal Reserve Notes, issued while he was in office. At the 1920 Democratic National Convention Glass was nominated for President as a favorite son candidate from Virginia.

Glass served at the Treasury until 1920, when he was appointed to the United States Senate to fill the vacancy caused by the death of Virginia's senior senator, Thomas Staples Martin. Martin had been widely regarded as the head of Virginia's Democratic Party, a role filled during the 1920s by Harry Flood Byrd of Winchester, another Virginia newspaperman who shared many of Glass's political views and who headed the political machine of Conservative Democrats known as the Byrd Organization, which dominated Virginia's politics until the 1960s. In 1933, Byrd became Virginia's junior Senator, joining Glass in the Senate after former Governor and then-senior U.S. Senator Claude A. Swanson was appointed as U.S. Secretary of the Navy by President Franklin Roosevelt. Both Glass and Byrd were opposed to Roosevelt's New Deal policies. Each was a strong supporter of fiscal conservatism and states' rights. Glass and Byrd invoked senatorial courtesy to defeat Roosevelt's nomination of Floyd H. Roberts to a federal judgeship, as part of a broader conflict over control of federal patronage in Virginia.

Glass served in the U.S. Senate for the remainder of his life, turning down the offer of a new appointment as Secretary of the Treasury from President Roosevelt in 1933. When the Democrats regained control of the Senate that year, Glass became Chairman of the Appropriations Committee. He was President pro tempore from 1941 to 1945, being succeeded as such by Kenneth McKellar at the start of the custom of giving that post to the senior senator of the majority party. As a Senator, Glass's most notable achievement was passage of the Glass–Steagall Act, which separated the activities of banks and securities brokers and created the Federal Deposit Insurance Corporation. Glass, however, opposed the concept of bank deposit insurance and was “very unhappy” about this reform. A less successful minor legislative initiative from Glass was a 1930 resolution to ban dial telephones from the Senate, a measure that was successfully resisted by younger senators who favored dial telephony.

== Electoral history ==
- 1902; Glass was elected to the U.S. House of Representatives with 79.41% of the vote, defeating Republican Aaron Graham, Independent James S. Cowdon, and Socialist Labor H.D. McTier.
- 1904; Glass was re-elected with 69.07% of the vote, defeating Republican Samuel H. Hoge and Socialist Elory R. Spencer.
- 1906; Glass was re-elected unopposed.
- 1908; Glass was re-elected with 65.92% of the vote, defeating Republicans M. Hartman and John M. Parsons and Independent Jacob Harvey.
- 1910; Glass was re-elected with 87.64% of the vote, defeating Republican William F. Allison.
- 1912; Glass was re-elected with 72.84% of the vote, defeating Populist James S. Browning and Independents Adon A. Yoder and Jacob Harvey.
- 1914; Glass was re-elected with 90.72% of the vote, defeating Socialist B.F. Ginther.
- 1916; Glass was re-elected unopposed.
- 1918; Glass was re-elected unopposed.
- 1924; Glass was elected to the Senate.
- 1930; Glass was re-elected to the Senate.
- 1936; Glass was re-elected to the Senate.
- 1942; Glass was re-elected to the Senate.

== Family, decline, death ==
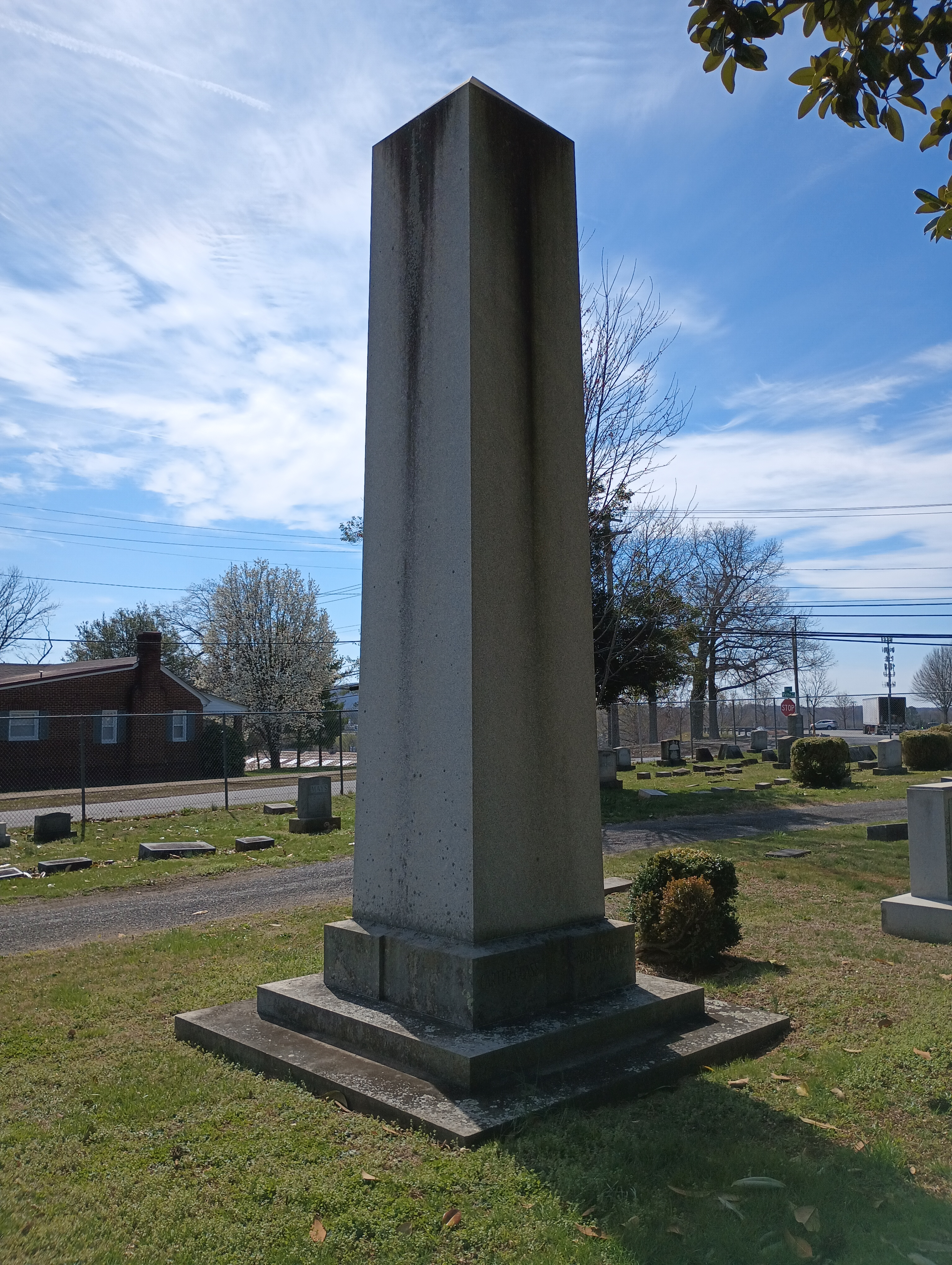
Gravesite shared by Glass and his wife at Spring Hill Cemetery, Lynchburg.

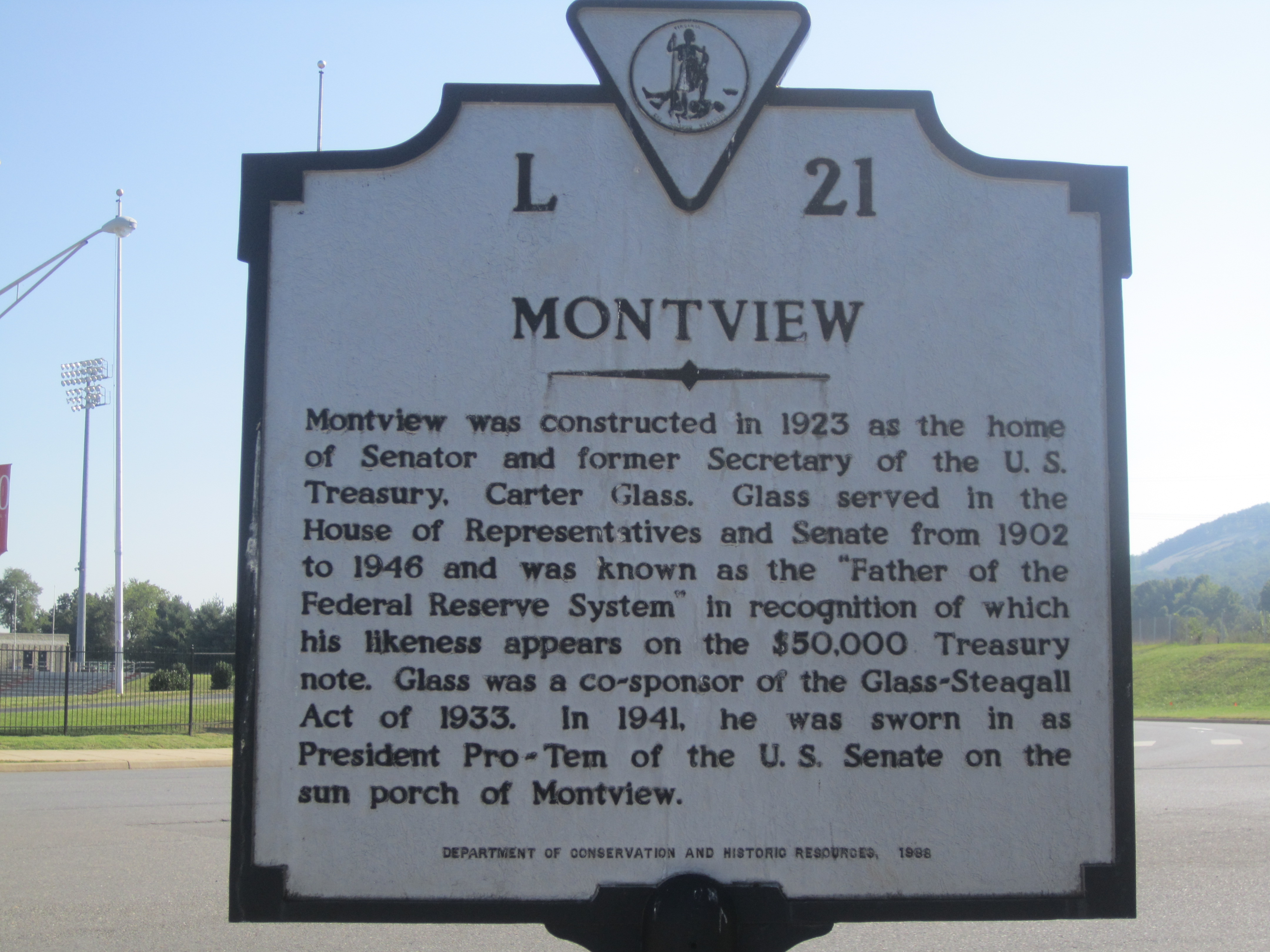
Glass's Montview historical marker in Lynchburg, Virginia

Carter Glass was a Methodist. When he was twenty-eight, Glass married Aurelia McDearmon Caldwell, a school teacher. They had four children. She died of a heart ailment in 1937. Glass remarried in 1940 at the age of 82. His second wife, Mary Scott, was his constant companion as his health began to fail over the next few years. They lived at the Mayflower Hotel Apartments in Washington, D.C. Starting in 1942, Glass began suffering from various age-related illnesses and could not attend Senate meetings after that time. However, he refused to resign from the Senate, despite many requests that he do so, and even kept his committee chairmanship. Many visitors were also kept away from him by his wife.

A confidential 1943 analysis of the Senate Foreign Relations Committee by Isaiah Berlin for the British Foreign Office stated that Glass

"...is very old and frail and something of a legend in the South. The fruit-growing interests of his State make him an opponent of the reciprocal trade pacts, but on all other questions he has loyally supported the President's anti-Isolationist policy. He cannot have many years of active service before him."

Glass died of congestive heart failure in Washington, D.C., on May 28, 1946. He is interred at Spring Hill Cemetery in Lynchburg. His fellow sponsor of the Glass-Owen Act, Senator Robert Latham Owen, lies nearby.

== Legacy ==
"Montview", also known as the "Carter Glass Mansion", was built in 1923 on his farm outside of the-then boundaries of Lynchburg in Campbell County. It is listed on the National Register of Historic Places and now serves as a museum on the grounds of Liberty University. It lies within the expanded city limits of Lynchburg. The front lawn of "Montview" is the burial site of Dr. Jerry Falwell, founder of Liberty University.

The Virginia Department of Transportation's Carter Glass Memorial Bridge was named in his honor in 1949. It carries the Lynchburg bypass of U.S. Route 29, the major north–south highway in the region, across the James River between Lynchburg and Amherst County.

A chair in the Department of Government was created in Glass's honor at Sweet Briar College. It has been held by notable faculty including Dr. Barbara A. Perry.

An administrative building at Harvard Business School was named for Glass in the late 1920s. In 2020, the name Glass was removed from this building due to the efforts by Glass to "strip Black citizens of their voting rights through means such as a poll tax and literacy test — efforts that intentionally disenfranchised Blacks and promulgated segregation, with pernicious and long-lasting effects." In a letter to the Harvard community, Dean Nitin Nohria said, "We therefore cannot allow the Glass name to remain at the School." The building was renamed as Cash House, in honor of James Cash Jr., a distinguished Professor who served at Harvard for 36 years beginning in 1976.

Glass is one of the few Americans to appear on a U.S. coin during his lifetime. As a very prominent citizen of the city of Lynchburg, the 1936 Lynchburg Sesquicentennial commemorative half dollar has his image and name on the obverse. Only 20,000 were minted as they were not intended for regular circulation.

== See also ==
- List of members of the United States Congress who died in office (1900–1949)

== Works ==
- Glass, Carter (1927). An Adventure in Constructive Finance. Doubleday, Page & Co. p. 448.

== Bibliography ==
- Palmer, James E. (1938). Carter Glass: Unreconstructed Rebel. Roanoke, Va.: Institute of American Biography. p. 370.
- Shaw, Christopher W. (2020). "The Politics of Elite Anxiety: Carter Glass and American Financial Policy". The Historian. 82 (3): 308–327. doi:10.1080/00182370.2020.1773753. S2CID 225353965.
- Shaw, Christopher W. (2019). Money, Power, and the People: The American Struggle to Make Banking Democratic. Chicago: University of Chicago Press.
- Wilkinson III, J. Harvie (1968). Harry Byrd and the Changing Face of Virginia Politics, 1945–66. Charlottesville: University Press of Virginia.

U.S. House of Representatives
Preceded by Peter J. Otey	Member of the U.S. House of Representatives from Virginia's 6th congressional district 1902–1918	Succeeded by James P. Woods
Preceded by Arsène Pujo	Chair of the House Banking Committee; 1913–1918	Succeeded by Michael Francis Phelan
Political offices
Preceded by William McAdoo	United States Secretary of the Treasury; 1918–1920	Succeeded by David F. Houston
Preceded by Pat Harrison	President pro tempore of the United States Senate; 1941–1945	Succeeded by Kenneth McKellar
U.S. Senate
Preceded by Thomas S. Martin	U.S. Senator (Class 2) from Virginia; 1920–1946; Served alongside: Claude A. Swanson, Harry F. Byrd	Succeeded by Thomas G. Burch
Preceded by Frederick Hale	Chair of the Senate Appropriations Committee; 1933–1946	Succeeded by Kenneth McKellar
Party political offices
Preceded by Thomas S. Martin	Democratic nominee for U.S. Senator from Virginia (Class 2); 1920, 1924, 1930, 1936, 1942	Succeeded by Absalom Willis Robertson
Awards and achievements
Preceded by Alfred von Tirpitz	Cover of Time; June 9, 1924	Succeeded by Pope Pius XI
