= The Conquest of Space (Lasser book) =

1931 nonfiction book written by David Lasser

- First edition
- Author: David Lasser
- Language: English
- Genre: nonfiction
- Publisher: Penguin Press
- Publication date: September 1931 (original); September 1, 2002
- Pages: 192
- ISBN: 978-1-896522-92-0

The Conquest of Space is a nonfiction book written by American author David Lasser in 1930, and self-published in 1931. It was the first book written in English that presented rocketry and spaceflight in a serious manner. The book profiles a fictional journey to the Moon to explain the science of rocketry as it stood in 1931. It uses contemporary knowledge on rockets to create a reasonable description of the hardware necessary to make spaceflight possible. The book was out of print until 2002, when it was republished by Apogee Books. As of 2011, the book remains in print.

According to the Historical Dictionary of Science Fiction, it contains the earliest known use of the word "astrogator", meaning space navigator.

== Reception ==
The book was generally well received. The New York Times stated on January 10, 1932 that "despite its literary and artistic faults the book cannot but capture the imagination of a reader interested in science." Harold Horton Sheldon wrote the original introduction to the 1931 edition. Arthur C. Clarke, who wrote the introduction to the 2002 edition, said that the book "was one of the turning points in [his] life."

Despite being published in 1931, it "still stands up to scrutiny" for many of its predictions in rocketry. However, other predictions appear to Larry McGlynn as "quaint" and "naive", among them the use of rockets solely for peaceful purposes.
