= 1936 United States Senate election in Virginia =

- November 3, 1936
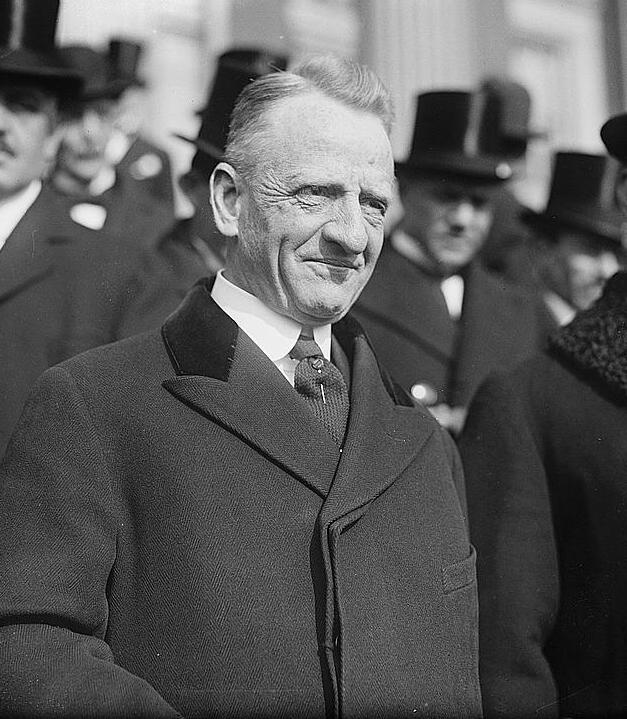
Nominee	Carter Glass
Party	Democratic
Popular vote	244,518
Percentage	91.66%
- County and independent city results Glass: 80–90% 90–100%
U.S. senator before election
Carter Glass
Democratic
Elected U.S. Senator
Carter Glass
Democratic

The 1936 United States Senate election in Virginia was held on November 3, 1936. Incumbent Democratic Senator Carter Glass defeated Republican George Rohlsen and was elected to his fourth term in office.

== General election ==
=== Candidates ===
- Donald Burke (Communist)
- A. J. Dunning (Independent)
- Carter Glass, incumbent Senator since 1920 (Democratic)
- George Rohlsen, Socialist candidate for U.S. House of Representatives in 1934 (Republican)
- Elbert Lee Trinkle, former Governor of Virginia (Independent Democratic)

=== Results ===
1936 U.S. Senate election in Virginia
Party	Candidate	Votes	%	±%
Democratic	Carter Glass (inc.)	244,518	91.66%	+14.99%
Republican	George Rohken	12,573	4.71%	+4.71%
Communist	Donald Burke	8,907	3.34%	+3.34%
Independent Democrat	Elbert Lee Trinkle	469	0.18%	−17.68%
Independent	A. J. Dunning	125	0.05%	
Write-ins		174	0.07%	+0.04%
Majority		231,945	86.95%	+28.14%
Turnout		266,766		
Democratic hold				
