= 1942 United States Senate election in Virginia =

- November 3, 1942
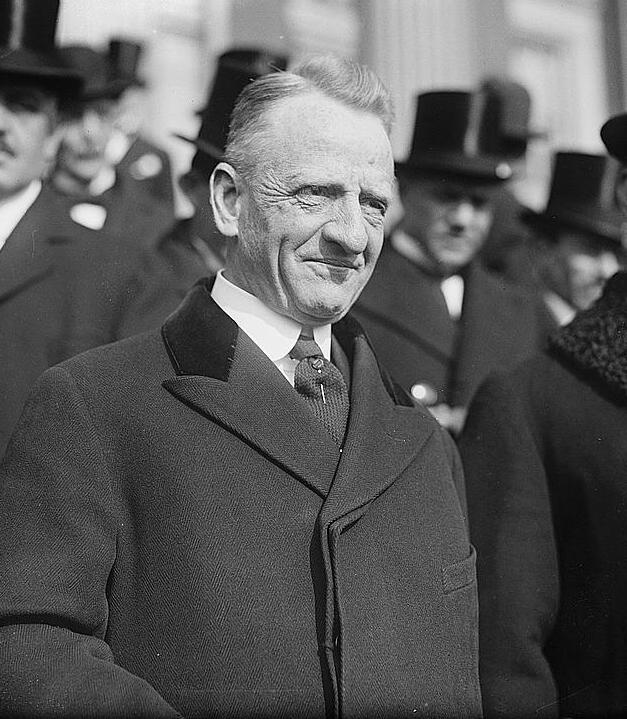

Nominee	Carter Glass	Lawrence S. Wilkes
Party	Democratic	Socialist
Popular vote	79,421	5,690
Percentage	91.08%	6.53%
- County and independent city results Glass: 80–90% 90–100% No Data/Vote
U.S. senator before election
Carter Glass
Democratic
Elected U.S. Senator
Carter Glass
Democratic

The 1942 United States Senate election in Virginia was held on November 3, 1942. Incumbent Democratic Senator Carter Glass defeated Socialist Lawrence S. Wilkes and was elected to his fifth term in office.

== Results ==
United States Senate election in Virginia, 1942
Party	Candidate	Votes	%	±%
Democratic	Carter Glass (inc.)	79,421	91.08%	+0.58%
Socialist	Lawrence S. Wilkes	5,690	6.53%	+6.53%
Communist	Alice Burke	2,041	2.34%	−1.00%
Write-ins		48	<0.01%	−0.07%
Majority		73,731	84.55%	−2.40%
Turnout		87,200		
Democratic hold				
