= 1924 United States Senate election in Virginia =

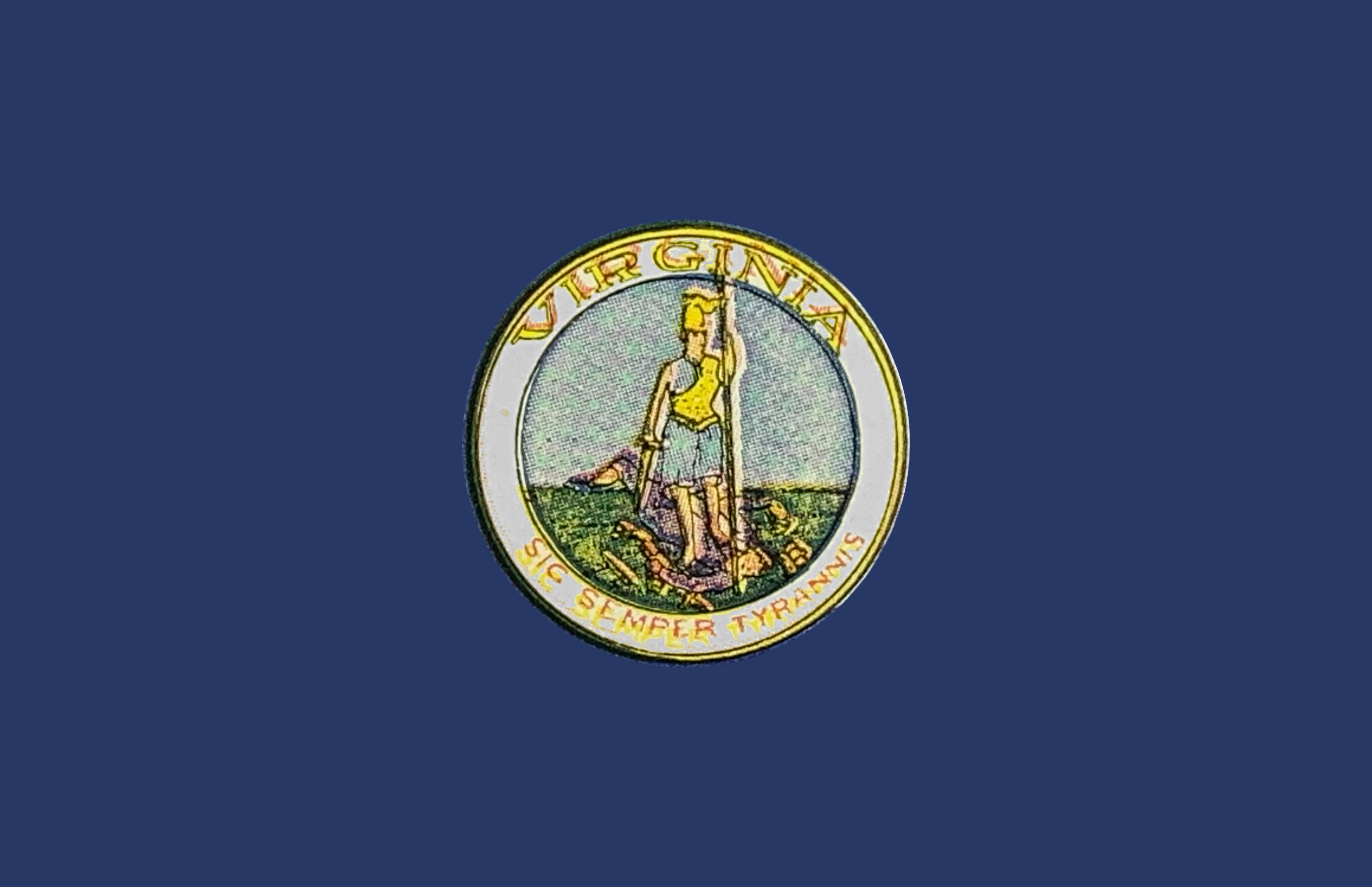
- November 4, 1924
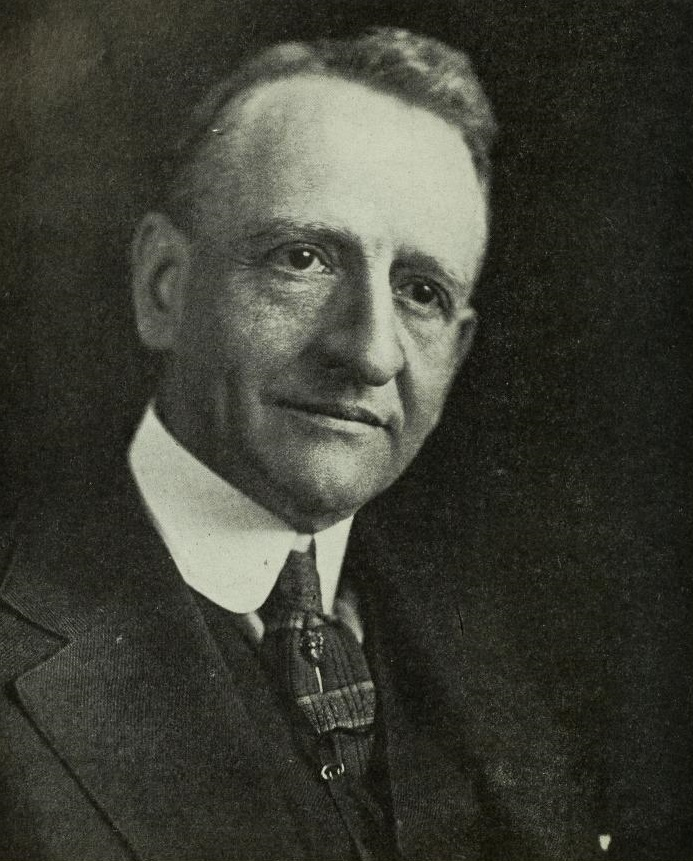

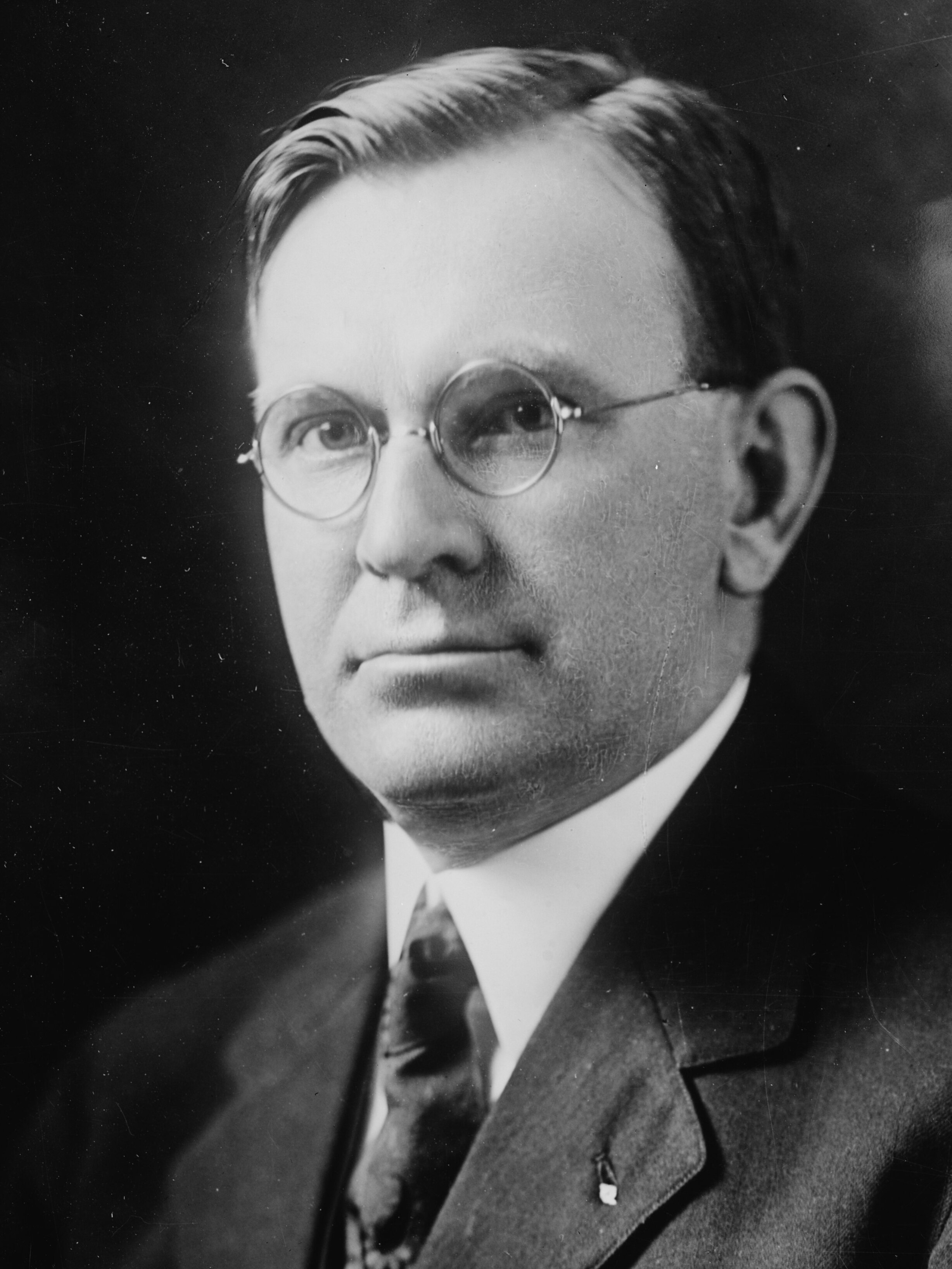
Nominee	Carter Glass	William N. Doak
Party	Democratic	Republican
Popular vote	151,498	50,092
Percentage	73.12%	24.18%
- County and independent city results Glass: 40–50% 50–60% 60–70% 70–80% 80–90% >90% Doak: 40–50% 50–60%
U.S. senator before election
Carter Glass
Democratic
Elected U.S. Senator
Carter Glass
Democratic

The 1924 United States Senate election in Virginia was held on November 4, 1924. Incumbent Democratic Senator Carter Glass defeated Republican William N. Doak and was elected to his second term in office.

== General election ==
=== Candidates ===
- William N. Doak, vice president of the Brotherhood of Railroad Trainmen (Republican)
- Carter Glass, incumbent Senator since 1920 (Democratic)
- Carroll L. Riker (Progressive)

United States Senate election in Virginia, 1924
Party	Candidate	Votes	%	±%
Democratic	Carter Glass (inc.)	151,498	73.12%	−18.19%
Republican	William N. Doak	50,092	24.18%	+15.49%
Progressive	Carroll L. Riker	5,594	2.70%	+2.70%
Majority		101,406	48.94%	−33.68%
Turnout		207,184		
Democratic hold				
