= Christopher W. Shaw =

American historian and author

- Education: PhD, University of California, Berkeley
- Occupations: Historian, author, and policy analyst

Christopher W. Shaw is an American historian, author, and policy analyst. In 2013, Shaw earned a PhD in history from the University of California, Berkeley. One of the primary focuses of his research has been the history of the United States Postal Service and its decline in recent decades, particularly due to the actions of Postmaster General Louis DeJoy. He was one of the first to recommend restarting postal banking in 2006, and has continued to promote this idea. Shaw is a project director at Ralph Nader's Center for Study of Responsive Law.

== Research and works ==
Shaw's 2019 book Money, Power, and the People: The American Struggle to Make Banking Democratic covered the history of the American banking system during the Progressive Era and the New Deal era, along with how events such as the Great Depression affected the public's trust in the system. The focus of the book is revealing the impact of collective action by working people on the U.S. banking system. This includes creation of the Federal Deposit Insurance Corporation, United States Postal Savings System, and Federal Farm Loan Act. The book covers all of this, but parts also are in journal articles. It also includes how collective action by working people reduced the influence of bankers on the Federal Reserve System in the Banking Act of 1935. Based on Shaw's research, he has called for making the Federal Reserve more accountable to citizens.

His research on the U.S. Postal Service documents its importance to American democracy. He was one of the first to recommend restarting postal banking in 2006, and has continued to promote this idea. He also proposed creating a "Post Office Consumer Action Group" that would give the public an organized voice to help counter the influence of large corporations on the U.S. Postal Service.

The validity of his research has been extensively and favorably reviewed.

== Published works ==
- First Class: The U.S. Postal Service, Democracy, and the Corporate Threat. City Lights Books. 2021. ISBN 978-0872868779.
- Money, Power, and the People: The American Struggle to Make Banking Democratic. University of Chicago Press. 2019. ISBN 9780226636337.
- Preserving the People's Post Office. Essential Books. 2006. ISBN 978-1893520035.
