= William N. Doak =

American politician (1882–1933)

William Doak
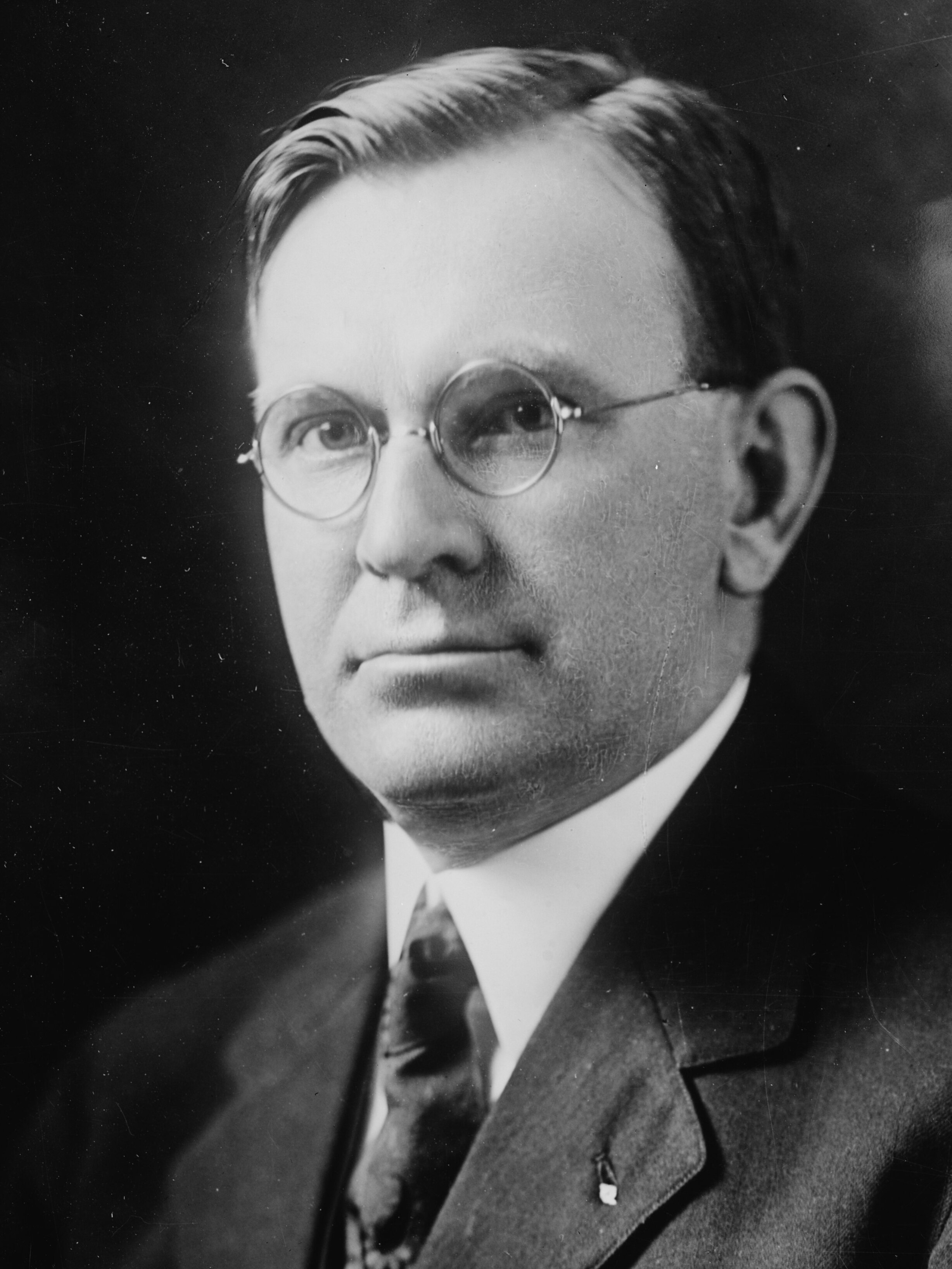

3rd United States Secretary of Labor
- In office December 9, 1930 – March 4, 1933
- President: Herbert Hoover
- Preceded by: James J. Davis
- Succeeded by: Frances Perkins

Personal details
- Born: December 12, 1882 Rural Retreat, Virginia, U.S.
- Died: October 23, 1933 (aged 50) McLean, Virginia, U.S.
- Party: Republican
- Spouse: Emma Cricher

William Nuckles Doak (December 12, 1882 – October 23, 1933) was an American labor leader. He was the vice-president of the Brotherhood of Railroad Trainmen and served as Secretary of Labor. He died of cardiovascular disease in McLean, Virginia six months after retiring.

== Biography ==
=== Early life ===
Doak was born in Rural Retreat, Virginia, on December 12, 1882, the son of Elizabeth (née Dutton) and Canaro Draton Doak. He attended from Virginia public and business, and was a Methodist. Doak married Emma Maria Cricher, on October 15, 1908. Doak served as the vice-president of the Brotherhood of Railroad Trainmen from 1916 to 1928.

=== Department of Labor ===
On December 9, 1930, Doak was appointed by President Hoover to serve as Secretary of Labor, succeeding Senator James J. Davis. He encouraged the passing of the Davis-Bacon Act, which determined the prevailing wage to be paid on a government contract or federally funded construction project.

=== Mexican repatriation ===
After President Herbert Hoover appointed Doak as secretary of labor, the Bureau of Immigration launched intensive raids to identify immigrants liable for deportation. Doak believed that removal of undocumented workers would reduce relief expenditures and free jobs for native-born citizens during the Great Depression. Though there is no evidence that Doak made any effort to single out any specific ethnic group, this resulted in the targeting of the Mexican community.

In 1931, the National Commission on Law Observance and Enforcement, (the Wickersham Commission) found the methods employed by Doak's underlings to be unconstitutional.

Doak retired at the end of President Hoover's administration on March 4, 1933. He died of cardiovascular disease in McLean, Virginia, on October 23, 1933. He is interred in Blacklick, Virginia.

== See also ==
- Brotherhood of Railroad Trainmen
- Davis-Bacon Act

Party political offices
Preceded by J. R. Pollard	Republican nominee for U.S. Senator from Virginia (Class 2); 1924	Vacant Title next held by George Rohken
Political offices
Preceded by James J. Davis	United States Secretary of Labor; 1930–1933	Succeeded by Frances Perkins
