= Salem Veterans Affairs Medical Center =

Historic house in Virginia, United States

- Roanoke Veterans Administration Hospital Historic District
- U.S. National Register of Historic Places
- U.S. Historic district
- Virginia Landmarks Register
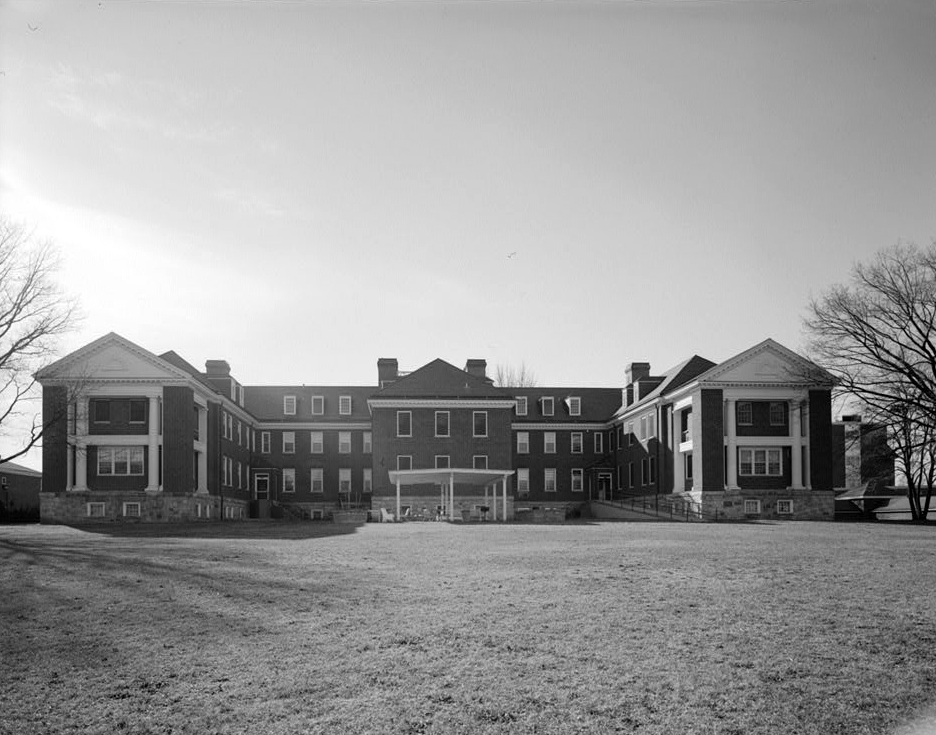
- HABS photograph of Building 6

- Location within Virginia Location within the United States
- Location: 1970 Roanoke Blvd., Salem, Virginia
- Coordinates: 37°16′34″N 80°01′26″W
- Area: 206 acres (83 ha)
- Built: c. 1934-1950
- Architectural style: Colonial Revival, Classical Revival
- MPS: United States Second Generation Veterans Hospitals Multiple Property Submission (MPS)
- NRHP reference No.: 12000609
- VLR No.: 129-0038

Significant dates
- Added to NRHP: September 4, 2012
- Designated VLR: not listed

Salem Veteran Affairs Medical Center (VAMC) is a Veterans Affairs hospital located in Salem, Virginia. Health care services are provided to veterans living in a 26-county area of Southwest Virginia. In addition to the main facility in Salem, there are affiliated services in three community-based outpatient clinics. These clinics are located in Danville, Lynchburg, Tazewell, Wytheville, and Staunton.

== Roanoke Veterans Administration Hospital Historic District ==
The Roanoke Veterans Administration Hospital Historic District is a national historic district encompassing 34 contributing buildings, 2 contributing sites, 17 contributing structures, and 1 contributing object. Construction began on the Roanoke (now Salem) VA Hospital in 1934, and various additions were constructed through 1950. The Main Building (1934) is situated on a raised elevation over the front lawn and serves as the focal point of the historic district. Other buildings include the Administration Building (1934), Dining Hall/Attendants’ Quarters (1934), Recreation Building (1934), Colored Patients’ Building (1934), four Continued Treatment Buildings (1938, 1941, 1940, 1938), and Neuropsychiatric Infirmary Building (1936). The buildings exhibit the Colonial Revival and Classical Revival architectural styles that were nationally popular at the time. It was listed on the National Register of Historic Places in 2012.
