= David Lasser =

American writer and activist (1902–1996)

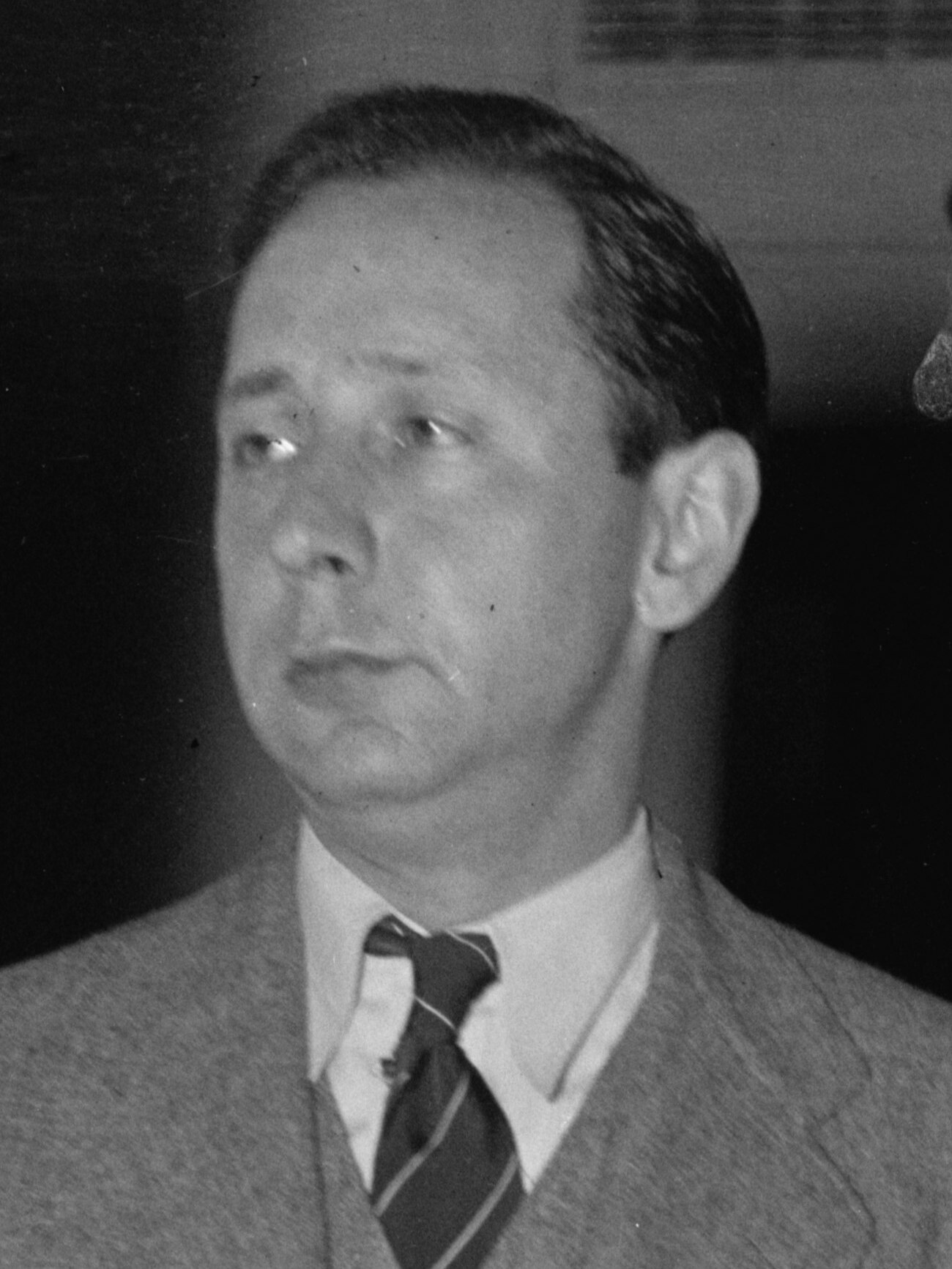
Lasser in 1937

David Lasser (March 20, 1902 – May 5, 1996) was an American writer and political activist. Lasser is remembered as an influential figure of early science fiction writing, working closely with Hugo Gernsback. He was also heavily involved in the workers’ rights struggles of the Great Depression.

== Early years ==
Lasser was born in Baltimore, Maryland, to Jewish immigrant parents from Russia. His family moved to Newark, New Jersey, where he grew up. He left high school at 16 to enlist in the Army in World War I, lying about his age. After being gassed on the front lines in France, he was honourably discharged as a Sergeant in 1919. Despite never graduating from high school, he was admitted to M.I.T., graduating with a B.S. in Engineering Administration.

In the late 1920s, Lasser moved to New York City, where his engineering background helped him land a job as managing editor of Hugo Gernsback's new science fiction magazine, Science Wonder Stories. Lasser and his writers, who included G. Edward Pendray, founded the American Interplanetary Society on April 4, 1930. They renamed it the American Rocket Society in 1934, and under the later leadership of Pendray, George P. Sutton and William H. Pickering, it became the American Institute of Aeronautics and Astronautics in 1963.

== Writing career ==
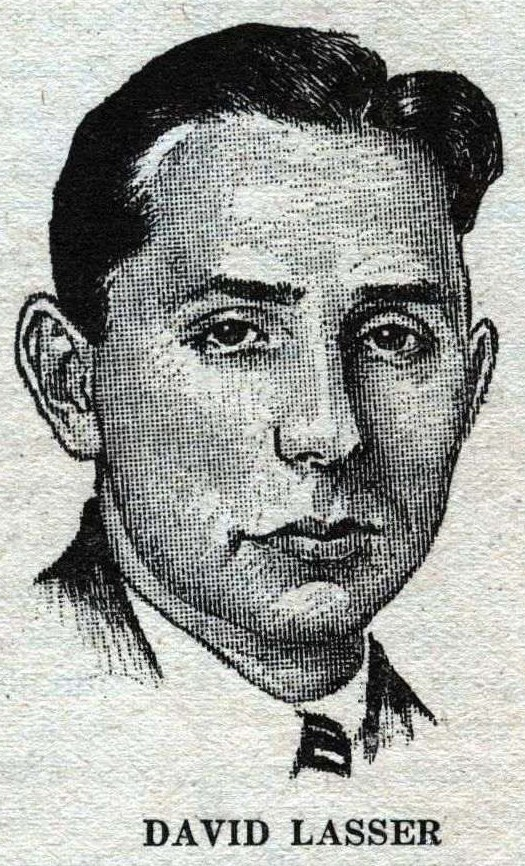
Lasser as depicted in Wonder Stories in 1931.

Lasser used his expertise in science, engineering, and rocketry to write The Conquest of Space (1931). It was the first non-fiction English-language book to deal with spaceflight and detailed how a man could one day travel into outer space. The book was an inspiration to a generation of science fiction writers, including Arthur C. Clarke. From 1929 to 1933, Lasser worked as the Managing Editor of Hugo Gernsback's Stellar Publishing Corporation. He was responsible for editing all the issues of Science Wonder Stories and Wonder Stories Quarterly, as well as identifying and retaining promising writers. Lasser also edited Gernsback's Wonder Stories from June 1930 to October 1933.

== Unemployed movement activist ==
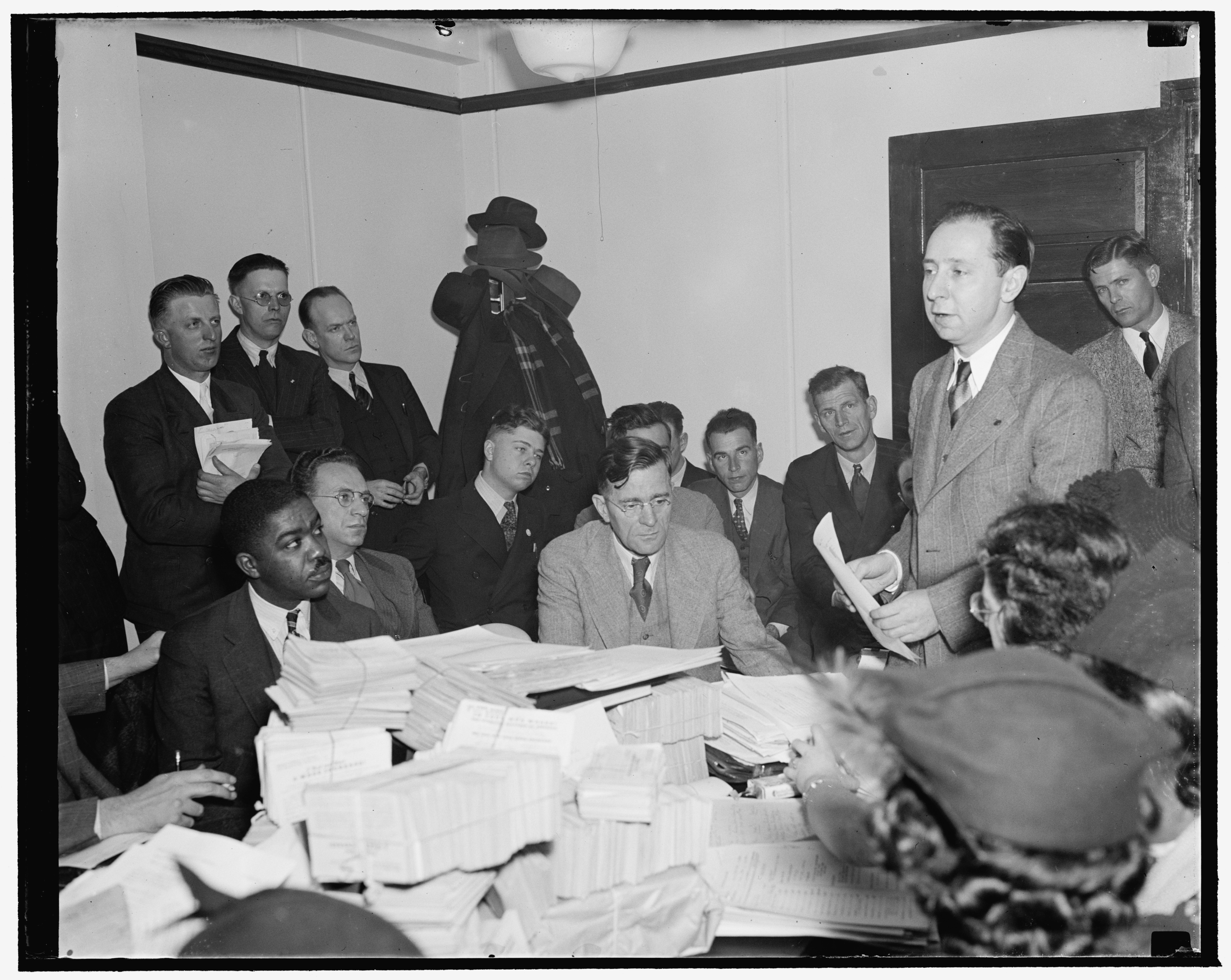
Lasser (standing, right), leading a delegation of Works Progress Administration workers, protests relief cuts to Assistant WPA Administrator Aubrey Willis Williams (seated, center), December 15, 1938

Lasser was at this same time a member of the Socialist Party and active in the unemployed movement in New York City. In 1933, the Socialist Party made Lasser national head of its Unemployed Leagues. The Party had founded these to organize the unemployed to demand more relief and to represent workers employed by the Works Progress Administration (WPA). One day, after returning from an unemployed rally at city hall, Lasser's boss, Hugo Gernsback, told him, "You love the unemployed so much, I suggest you go join them." He fired Lasser, after which Lasser threw himself even more into the unemployed movement.

Simultaneously, and in opposition to the Socialist Party, the Communist Party was organizing the unemployed through its Unemployed Councils. In 1935 the Communists internationally were ordered to form coalitions with similar organizations. Under the new "no enemies to the left" policy, the Communists stopped attacking the Socialist Party and suggested that they merge their unemployed efforts. The result of the merger of the Socialist Unemployed Leagues and the Communist Unemployed Councils was the Workers Alliance of America. In a spirit of unity, the Communists deferred to the Socialists and Lasser was elected president of the Workers Alliance. Herbert Benjamin, head of the Communist Unemployed Councils, became Vice President of the Alliance.

In 1939 Lasser resigned from the Workers Alliance, claiming that it was Communist-dominated. Even so, the U.S. Congress passed legislation specifically banning Lasser by name from employment by the federal government. He then served as economics and research director of the International Union of Electrical, Radio and Machine Workers until his retirement in 1969.

Lasser's leadership of the Workers Alliance brought him under investigation by the Federal Bureau of Investigation as a possible subversive. His name was not officially cleared until 1980 when he was sent a personal letter of apology by President Jimmy Carter.

Lasser died in 1996 at the Remington Senior Care Facility in Rancho Bernardo, California. He was 94 years old and was survived by his third wife and a son. There is an extensive interview with Lasser, covering his careers in both science fiction and the labor movement, in Eric Leif Davin's "Pioneers of Wonder".

== Memorial ==
The American Institute of Aeronautics and Astronautics (AIAA) currently awards the Gardner-Lasser Aerospace History Literature Award to the best original non-fiction work dealing with aeronautics or aeronautical history. The award is named to honor David Lasser and Lester Gardner.

== Published works ==
- D.-C armature and field-coil repair Scranton, Pa., International Textbook Co., 1929 (with Clifford Carr)
- Alternating-current motor repair Scranton, Pa., International Textbook Co., 1929 (with Clifford Carr)
- The Conquest of Space New York, Penguin Press, 1931
- A-C motor rewinding and reconnecting Scranton, Pa., International Textbook Co., 1936 (with Clifford Carr and Adolphus Dudley)
- Work and security: a program for America. [Washington] : [Workers Alliance of America], 1938
- Old-age security $60 at 60 Washington, D.C. : Workers Alliance of America, 1939
- Private monopoly; the enemy at home New York, Harper 1945
- Labor and world affairs New York : Foreign Policy Association, 1949 Foreign policy reports; v. 25, no. 13. Nov. 15, 1949;

=== Articles ===
- "With vehicle perfected, science hopes to plumb mystery of outer space." New York Herald Tribune. 13 July. 1930
- "By Rocket to the Planets." Nature Magazine. Nov. 1931
- "The Time Projector" Part 1 Wonder Stories Volume 3, No 2 July 1931
- "The Time Projector" Part 2 Wonder Stories Volume 3, No 3 August 1931
