= Ken Lancaster =

American politician (1943–2026)

Member of the Alaska House of Representatives
- In office January 8, 2001 – January 21, 2003
- Preceded by: Gary Davis
- Constituency: 8th district

Mayor of Soldotna, Alaska
- In office October 27, 1993 – December 27, 2001
- Preceded by: Bill Reeder
- Succeeded by: Dave Carey

Member of the Soldotna, Alaska city council
- In office 1989–1993
- Preceded by: Scott McLane
- Succeeded by: Jim Stogsdill

Personal details
- Born: August 13, 1943 Anchorage, Alaska, U.S.
- Died: September 2, 2026 (aged 83) Soldotna, Alaska, U.S.
- Party: Republican
- Spouse(s): Lani; Mavis Harlene Lancaster; Vickie Graham
- Children: 8

Kenneth V. Lancaster Jr. (August 13, 1943 – September 2, 2026) was an American politician who served in the Alaska House of Representatives from 2001 to 2003, as a member of the Republican Party. He was active in the local politics of Soldotna, Alaska, where he served on the city council and as mayor.

== Early life ==
Kenneth V. Lancaster Jr. was born in Anchorage, Alaska, on August 13, 1943. He lived in Anchorage until 1949, Cooper Landing from 1949 to 1962, and moved to Soldotna in 1962. He graduated from high school in Seward in 1961.

Lancaster was a member of the National Guard for ten years and worked as a real estate broker. He was a member of the International Brotherhood of Teamsters.

== Career ==
=== Local politics ===
Lancaster was elected to the Soldotna city council after defeating incumbent Scott McLane in 1989, and faced no opposition in 1992. He ran for mayor in 1990, but lost to councilor Gary Davis. In 1993, Lancaster was selected by the city council to serve as vice mayor.

Lancaster ran for mayor of the Kenai Peninsula Borough in 2002, but lost to incumbent Dale Bagley. John Williams selected Lancaster to be the head of his transition team after being elected mayor of the Kenai Peninsula Borough. Lancaster served as president of the Kenai River Special Management Area board and the Soldotna chamber of commerce.

=== Mayoralty ===
Lancaster was elected mayor without opposition in 1993, and Jim Stogsdill was selected to fill Lancaster's vacant council seat. He was reelected without opposition in 1996 and 1999. Dave Carey won the 2001 mayoral special election to replace Lancaster, who resigned to take a seat in the Alaska House of Representatives.

Soldotna Airport saw its usage decline from the 1980s to the 1990s and cost Soldotna $160,000 per year. Soldotna was unable to find a bidder to take over operations of the airport in 1992, but Lancaster opposed closing it. He was appointed to the airport's commission in 1993.

A three-member delegation including Lancaster went to Sakhalin in 1994 as part of a fact-finding trip and to help prepare Russian officials for a visit to Alaska.

Rich Underkofler resigned as city manager in 1995, and Tom Boedeker was selected to replace him in 1996; Lancaster supported hiring a person from the area, as Boedeker was from the Kenai Peninsula, over other candidates from different areas. The position of maintenance superintendent was eliminated in 1996.

=== State politics ===
Gary Davis, a Republican member of the state house, declined to seek reelection in 2000. Lancaster was elected to the state house as a Republican. During his tenure he served on the Finance and Budget committees. He did not seek reelection in 2002.

Lancaster endorsed Democratic gubernatorial nominee Tony Knowles in the 1998 election. Andrew Halcro initially had Lancaster as his lieutenant gubernatorial running mate during the 2006 gubernatorial election, but Lancaster withdrew citing personal reasons. Fay Von Gemmingen was selected to replace Lancaster.

== Political positions ==
Lancaster opposed placing a limit on property taxes. He opposed abortion rights. He proposed legislation to reduce the session time of the state legislature from 120 days to 90 days. Legislation proposed by Lancaster to expand the Kenai River Special Management Area by 8,000 acres was passed by the state house, but failed in the Alaska State Senate.

Lancaster opposed using money from the Alaska Permanent Fund to pay for the state budget. He cosponsored legislation in 2002 to use $59.3 million from the Alaska Permanet Fund to fund state assistance to local areas; the state budget had a deficit of $1.1 billion at the time.

== Personal life ==
Lancaster married Lani, who later died. Mavis Harlene Lancaster, with whom he had eight children; Mavis died on November 15, 2018. He later married Vickie Graham. He died in Soldotna on September 2, 2026.

== Electoral history ==
Electoral history of Kurt Wright
Year	Office	Party	Primary			General			Result	Ref.
Year	Office	Party	Total	%	P.	Total	%	P.	Result	Ref.
1990	Mayor of Soldotna, Alaska	Nonpartisan	No primary			210	32.01%	2nd	Lost	
1993	Mayor of Soldotna, Alaska	Nonpartisan	No primary			538	100.00%	1st	Won	
1996	Mayor of Soldotna, Alaska	Nonpartisan	No primary			532	100.00%	1st	Won	
1999	Mayor of Soldotna, Alaska	Nonpartisan	No primary			531	100.00%	1st	Won	
2000	Alaska House of Representatives (8th district)	Republican	723	43.69%	1st	4,539	63.02%	1st	Won	
2002	Mayor of Kenai Peninsula Borough, Alaska	Nonpartisan	No primary			5,005	45.97%	1st	Lost	

== Works cited ==
=== News ===
- D'oro, Rachel (September 21, 2014). "Judge to move quickly on ballot lawsuit". Peninsula Clarion. Archived from the original on September 6, 2026.
- Sorrell, Nick (September 5, 2026). "Former Soldotna Mayor and State Legislator Ken Lancaster Dies at 83". KKIS-FM. Archived from the original on September 6, 2026.

=== Newspapers ===
- "District 8: Alaska House candidates respond to survey". Anchorage Daily News. November 3, 2000. p. B2 – via Newspapers.com.
- "District 8 Q&A". Peninsula Clarion. August 15, 2000. p. A10 – via Newspapers.com.
- "Election 90". Peninsula Clarion. October 3, 1990. p. 1 – via Newspapers.com.
- "Final results did not change election outcomes". Anchorage Daily News. October 9, 2002. p. B3 – via Newspapers.com.
- "How we voted". Peninsula Clarion. October 6, 1993. p. 7 – via Newspapers.com.
- "How we voted". Peninsula Clarion. October 2, 1996. p. 1 – via Newspapers.com.
- "How we voted". Peninsula Clarion. October 7, 1999. p. A8 – via Newspapers.com.
- "Kenai: Vote count". Anchorage Daily News. October 4, 1989. p. A8 – via Newspapers.com.
- "Lancaster to be vice mayor". Peninsula Clarion. February 17, 1993. p. 3 – via Newspapers.com.
- "Mavis Harlene Lancaster". Peninsula Clarion. November 20, 2018. p. A3 – via Newspapers.com.
- "New Soldotna airport group forms". Peninsula Clarion. April 12, 1993. p. 3 – via Newspapers.com.
- "Peninsula delegation off to Sakhalin Island". Peninsula Clarion. June 6, 1994. p. 5 – via Newspapers.com.
- "Peninsula lawmakers hit the ground running in state Legislature". Peninsula Clarion. January 19, 2001. p. A4 – via Newspapers.com.
- "Rep. Ken Lancaster". Juneau Empire. January 21, 2001. p. 26 – via Newspapers.com.
- "Republicans and Business Leaders have something to say about Tony Knowles". Anchorage Daily News. November 1, 1998. p. C4 – via Newspapers.com.
- "Revenue search turns to fund". Anchorage Daily News. March 21, 2002. p. A1 – via Newspapers.com.
- "Soldotna fails to attract bidders to run city airport". Anchorage Daily News. September 9, 1992. p. B2 – via Newspapers.com.
- Cejnar, Jessica (January 16, 2008). "KRSMA". Peninsula Clarion. p. A2 – via Newspapers.com.
- Dischner, Molly (June 16, 2011). "Borough mayor's job draws four". Homer News. p. 1 – via Newspapers.com.
- Hermanek, Phil (August 28, 2006). "2 of 5 city council seats contested". Peninsula Clarion. p. A7 – via Newspapers.com.
- Holst, Svend (January 5, 2000). "Soldotna lawmaker to leave Legislature after session". Juneau Empire. p. 1 – via Newspapers.com.
- Hopkins, Kyle (September 16, 2006). "Wanted, ASAP: Running mate for governor candidate". Anchorage Daily News. p. A1 – via Newspapers.com.
- Kizzia, Tom (September 29, 1990). "Soldotna voters to answer advisory questions, decide mayor race". Anchorage Daily News. p. B12 – via Newspapers.com.
- Kohl, Patrice (March 28, 2006). "Board revved up over motors". Peninsula Clarion. p. A1 – via Newspapers.com.
- Lawley, Janie (March 20, 1996). "Boedecker named city manager". Peninsula Clarion. p. 1 – via Newspapers.com.
- Lawley, Janie (September 21, 1992). "Candidates point to Soldotna's unfinished business". Peninsula Clarion. p. 1 – via Newspapers.com.
- Lawley, Janie (January 11, 1996). "City eliminates 'superfluous' position". Peninsula Clarion. p. 1 – via Newspapers.com.
- Little, Jon (May 11, 2001). "Parks plan is put on hold". Anchorage Daily News. p. B1 – via Newspapers.com.
- Loshbaugh, Doug (March 25, 2001). "KRSMA addition on table". Peninsula Clarion. p. A1 – via Newspapers.com.
- Roseburg, Sandy (September 17, 1996). "City of Soldotna: Labor, Lancaster both run unopposed". Peninsula Clarion. p. 1 – via Newspapers.com.
- Ruskin, Liz (April 23, 1992). "Union not an issue HEA candidates say". Homer News. p. 11 – via Newspapers.com.
- Smith, Sara (November 1, 2005). "New mayor ready to roll". Peninsula Clarion. p. A1 – via Newspapers.com.
- Spence, Hal (June 14, 2007). "Carey". Peninsula Clarion. p. A2 – via Newspapers.com.
- Spence, Hal (July 23, 2002). "Lancaster to seek borough mayor spot". Peninsula Clarion. p. A1 – via Newspapers.com.
- Spence, Hal (June 8, 2006). "Lt. gov.'s race draws two peninsula men". Homer News. p. 12A – via Newspapers.com.
- Thiessen, Mark (September 21, 2006). "Halcro chooses new running mate". Juneau Empire. p. A3 – via Newspapers.com.

=== Web ===
- "Bio Page for Ken Lancaster". Alaska State Legislature. Archived from the original on September 6, 2026.
- "Ken Lancaster Obituary". Legacy.com. September 25, 2026. Archived from the original on September 17, 2026.
- "State of Alaska General Election 2000 Summary for Jurisdiction Wide, All Races OFFICIAL RESULTS". Alaska Division of Elections. Archived from the original on September 17, 2026.
- "State of Alaska Primary Election 2000 Summary for Jurisdiction Wide, All Races OFFICIAL RESULTS". Alaska Division of Elections. Archived from the original on September 17, 2026.
