= John Green Brady =

American politician (1847–1918)

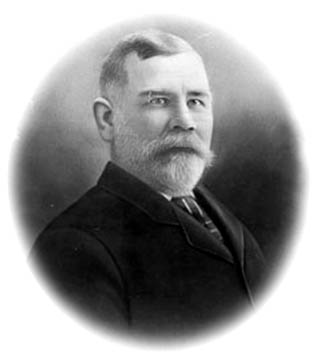

5th Governor of District of Alaska
- In office July 15, 1897 – March 2, 1906
- Nominated by: William McKinley
- Preceded by: James Sheakley
- Succeeded by: Wilford Bacon Hoggatt

Personal details
- Born: May 25, 1847 New York City, U.S.
- Died: December 17, 1918 (aged 71) Sitka, Territory of Alaska
- Party: Republican
- Spouse: Elizabeth Jane Patton

John (James) Green Brady (June 15, 1848 – December 17, 1918) was an American politician who served as the Governor of the District of Alaska from 1897 to 1906. Brady was forced to resign due to his alleged involvement with the fraudulent Reynolds–Alaska Development Company.

== Childhood ==
John Green Brady was born in New York City. Upon the death of his mother, his father remarried. Brady did not get along well with his step-mother, and at the age of eight ran away from home to avoid beatings from his drunken father. He was found living on the streets of New York City by Theodore Roosevelt, Sr. a well-known and popular New York City philanthropist and the father of future US 26th President, Theodore Roosevelt. Many years later, as an adult, Brady would approach the younger Theodore Roosevelt, then governor of New York, at a 1900 conference in Portland, Oregon. He warmly shook Roosevelt's hand and told him:

"Governor Roosevelt, the other governors have greeted you with interest, simply as a fellow governor and a great American. but I greet you with infinitely more interest, as the son of your father, the first Theodore Roosevelt." When greeted warmly by Governor Roosevelt and asked why and in what special way he had been interested in his father, Governor Brady replied, "Your father picked me up on the streets of New York, a waif and an orphan, and sent me to a Western family, paying for my transportation and early care. Years passed and I was able to repay the money which had given me my start in life, but I can never repay what he did for me, for it was through that early care and by giving me such a foster mother and father that I gradually rose in the world until I greet his son as a fellow governor of a part of our great country."

Brady was living at the House of Refuge on Randall's Island when he learned about the Orphan Train. The eleven-year-old Brady declared himself to be an orphan and, on August 2, 1859, boarded a train bound for Indiana. Over the course of the week-long journey, Brady forged what would be a lifelong friendship with Andrew Burke, another boy his age from Randall's. The boys got off the train at Noblesville, Indiana, where they were taken to "Aunt" Jenny Fergusson's hotel, fed and, in turn, put on display for prospective adopters.

Brady's experience as an orphan train rider is discussed in the book Orphan Trains: Taking the Rails to a New Life, by Rebecca Langston-George.

Brady went to live with the family of John Green, of Tipton County, Indiana. Judge John Green recalled, "I decided to take John Brady home with me because I considered him the homeliest, toughest, most unpromising boy in the whole lot. I had a curious desire to see what could be made of such a specimen of humanity." Brady attended Yale University and graduated in 1874.

Brady married Elizabeth Jane Patton in 1887 in Sitka, Alaska. They had five children: John Green Brady Jr., Hugh P. Brady, Sheldon Jackson Brady, Mary Beattie Brady and Elizabeth P. Brady.

== District of Alaska ==
Brady moved to the Alaska Territory first as a Presbyterian minister, then a missionary and then a lawyer. In 1878 he co-founded what is now Sheldon Jackson College as a school to train Alaska Natives.

Later he would be appointed Governor for three terms. He was introduced to the infamous Alaskan gangster Soapy Smith during the 1898 Fourth of July festivities in Skagway. Brady was made aware of Smith's criminal activities and offered him a position as a Deputy U.S. Marshal in Sitka, if he would quit Skagway. Smith turned down the position, which Brady noted in a personal letter. Four days after meeting him, Smith was killed in the famed Shootout on Juneau Wharf.

Governor Brady had an interest in preserving the culture of the Alaska natives. He orchestrated the placement of 15 Haida and Tlingit totem poles and two traditional houses for the 1904 Louisiana Purchase Exposition. He was instrumental in the preservation and relocation of the totem poles from Old Kasaan village to Sitka shortly after Old Kasaan's abandonment.

In 1897, Brady was appointed to be Governor of the Territory of Alaska by Republican President William McKinley. He served for three terms and became involved in the Reynolds-Alaska Development Company which was under investigation for corruption. U.S. Secretary of the Interior Ethan A. Hitchcock (Interior) (R) under Republican President Theodore Roosevelt, charged that Brady had acted improperly in his association with Reynolds-Alaska and public clamor soon led Brady to resign though he vigorously denied that he was guilty of any wrongdoing. Without charges, Brady was asked to resign in 1906 and went to work for Reynolds-Alaska. He was never convicted.

Brady died on December 17, 1918, and was buried in Sitka National Cemetery in Sitka, Alaska. He was interred in Section R, Plot 4 in December 1918. The monument at his grave bears the inscription: "A life ruled by faith in God and Man."

Political offices
Preceded by James Sheakley	District Governor of Alaska; 1897–1906	Succeeded by Wilford Bacon Hoggatt
