= 1997 Golden North Salmon Derby boycott =

A boycott of the 1997 Golden North Salmon Derby, held in Juneau, Alaska, was called for by the Alaska Native Brotherhood (ANB) because of the political stances of the Territorial Sportsmen Inc. (TSI), the derby's sponsor, on the issues of subsistence, Indian Country, the creation of five new Southeast native corporations passed over by the Alaska Native Claims Settlement Act, and the classification of halibut as a subsistence food. After a month of public debate and several days of mediated discussion an accord was signed by both groups, with TSI agreeing to not use derby funds for political advocacy, the ANB agreeing to call off the boycott, and periodic town hall meetings established for discussion on the issues raised by the ANB.

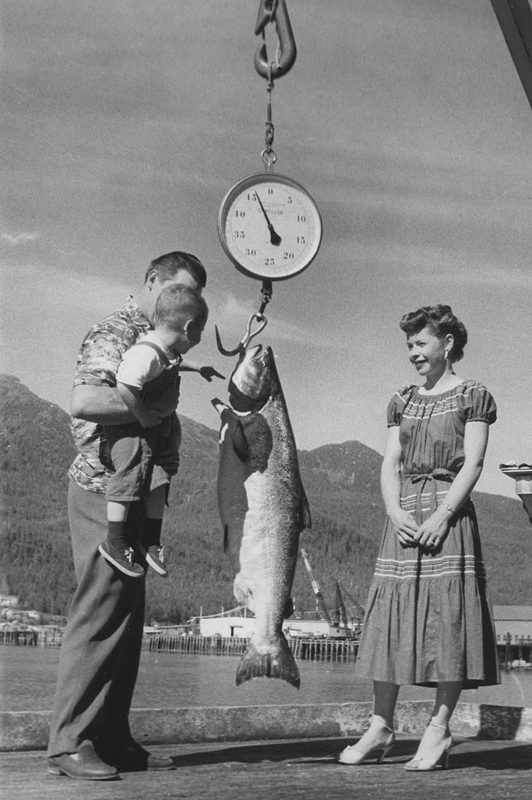
Golden North Salmon Derby Winner 1955 Meyer

== Boycott events ==
The boycott was announced by ANB Grand Camp president Richard Stitt, made public July 14, 1997, in the Juneau Empire, little over a month before the scheduled derby date. Stitt said TSI had opposed them on the issues of subsistence and Native corporation creation in aggressive ways that pointed at racism. At the Southeast Native Subsistence Summit of July 18 and 19 it was unanimously voted to back the ANB's boycott. Territorial Sportsmen Inc. responded to the call for a boycott with a six-page letter to the ANB asking them to rethink the boycott and for a chance to meet to communicate; in the letter the TSI's stances were reaffirmed, but it was stressed that TSI had a "racially blind policy" for membership and scholarship recipients from derby proceeds. Ron Somerville, TSI's president, called the ANB's claim that TSI was racist "absurd" and claimed the boycott would hurt Natives who otherwise could have benefited from scholarship money provided through the competition. In a Juneau Chamber of Commerce luncheon on July 18 Somerville asked Stitt if his resignation would end the boycott, to which the answer was no. Several businesses informed both groups of their intent to drop sponsorship of the derby. On July 21 Mayor Dennis Egan, along with the Juneau assembly, offered for the city to pay for a professional mediator because of concerns that the disagreement would cause community conflict. A list of potential mediators was given to both groups. The offer of mediation was accepted August 8, with Catholic Bishop Michael Warfel acting as mediator. Also on August 8, a protest against the boycott was held by the United Native Shareholders, citing as reasons that they were upset at the ANB's control over where they were allowed to fish and that the ANB's time would be better spent writing to Congress about their inequities rather than targeting an organization that had its own political agenda; the protest only had an eight-person turn out, three of whom were kids. The mediated talks started on the 15th of August. The ANB said they would suspend the boycott if TSI pledged to spend all derby proceeds on scholarships (with none going to political lobbying) and if TSI pledged to talk about the issues of subsistence and Native corporation creation. TSI claimed that already the net income of the derby went into the scholarship funds, but refused to accept the ANB's requests unless the ANB apologized for calling them 'racist'. The ANB agreed to apologize for calling TSI racist, if TSI would apologize for an undisclosed statement made in correspondence. August 21, a day before the start of the derby, an accord was signed by both groups calling off the boycott under certain stipulations.

== Aftermath ==
In the accord, TSI agreed to provide their financial statements from '96 and '97 to the ANB and to only use membership fees and general donations to fund their political advocacy; the ANB agreed to call off the boycott; both groups agreed to jointly preside over periodic town hall meetings to discuss the issues raised by the ANB and to hold periodic summit sessions to brainstorm solutions to these issues. The first of these summit sessions was held November 18, 1997. By January 21, 1998 TSI had sent their financial summary to ANB, as agreed to in the accord. The town hall style meeting was set for March 26, 1998; each side got thirty minutes for a presentation, followed by an open question and answer period. There were about 70 audience members in attendance. The ANB's presentation started off with a talk on the relationship between Native tribes and the federal government and misunderstanding over Native sovereignty's effects in Alaska; it continued to a discussion of subsistence and the creation of new Native corporations. The Territorial Sportsmen Inc.'s presentation reinstated that they held opposing views to the ANB, that they were strong supporters of state rights, and that they would have to "agree to disagree". Stitt expressed disappointment that the TSI was continuing to argue with them. A representative from the TSI said that Stitt expected more out of the forum (namely, for them to change their political positions) than they were willing to give. The meeting was broadcast on television. The fish yield of the 1997 derby was 25% lower than usual—possible factors contributing to this, in addition to the proposed boycott, include bad weather and a late salmon run that year. In running for reelection, Egan's action in promoting mediation between the two groups was used as a demonstration of his diplomacy
