= Senator Green =

Senator Green may refer to:

== Members of the United States Senate ==
- James S. Green (1817–1870), U.S. Senator from Missouri
- Theodore F. Green (1867–1966), U.S. Senator from Rhode Island from 1937 to 1961

== United States state senate members ==
- Byram Green (1786–1865), New York State Senate
- Duff Green (1791–1875), Missouri State Senate
- Gene Green (born 1947), Texas State Senate
- George E. Green (politician) (1858–1917), New York State Senate
- Henry Dickinson Green (1857–1929), Pennsylvania State Senate
- J. Herbert Green (1860–?), Wisconsin State Senate
- John Aloysius Green (1844–1920), Iowa State Senate
- John Patterson Green (1845–1940), Ohio State Senate
- John Green (judge) (1807–1887), Indiana State Senate
- Josh Green (politician) (born 1970), Hawaii State Senate
- Lyda Green (1938–2023), Alaska State Senate
- Mark E. Green (born 1964), Tennessee State Senate
- Mike Green (Michigan politician) (born 1948), Michigan State Senate
- Mike Green (West Virginia politician) (born 1973), West Virginia State Senate
- Reed Green (politician) (1865–1937), Illinois State Senate
- Sanford M. Green (1807–1901), Michigan State Senate
- Thomas Jefferson Green (1802–1863), California State Senate and Senate of the Republic of Texas
- Timothy P. Green (born 1963), Missouri State Senate
- Warren Green (South Dakota politician) (1869–1945), South Dakota State Senate
- William Green (U.S. labor leader) (1873–1952), Ohio State Senate

== See also ==
- Senator Greene (disambiguation)
