= The Nome Nugget =

Newspaper in Nome, Alaska

- "Alaska's Oldest Newspaper"
- Type: Weekly newspaper
- Format: Broadsheet
- Owner(s): Diana Haecker; Nils Hahn
- Founder: John Franklin Alexander Strong
- Founded: 1899
- Language: English
- Headquarters: 222 Front St; Nome, AK 99762; United States
- Price: $0.50.
- ISSN: 0745-9106
- OCLC number: 2720350
- Website: nomenugget.net

The Nome Nugget is a weekly newspaper published on Thursdays in Nome, Alaska, United States and serves the entire Northwest region of Alaska. Additionally, it is printed in Anchorage, Alaska for newsstands and airports. It is owned by Diana Haecker and Nils Hahn under the name Nugget Publishing Corp. The Nugget is the oldest continuously published newspaper in Alaska.

== Distribution ==
The Nome Nugget produces approximately 2,600 papers per issue and reaches a total of 10,400 readers just from the paper copies. Additionally, the Nome Nugget is delivered to every state in the United States via subscriptions. The Nome Nugget is the primary news source for news in the city of Nome and in the 15 surrounding communities in the Northwest region of Alaska. According to the newspaper, “Nome is the logistical and economical hub for the surrounding 15 Bering Strait and Norton Sound communities that are off the road system.” It is the only news outlet with reach to nearly every village in the region. They include Little Diomede, Shishmaref, Wales, Brevig Mission, Teller, Solomon, Council, White Mountain, Golovin, Elim, Koyuk, Shaktoolik, Unalakleet, St. Michaels and Stebbins.

== History ==
In 1898, brothers William A. Steel and Harry G. Steel of Washington started the Dawson Daily News in Dawson City, Yukon. The business catered to prospectors heading to the Klondike Gold Rush and operated two linotype machines. A year later miners began migrating to Cape Nome to take part in the Nome Gold Rush.

On October 9, 1899, the Steel brothers established a weekly in Nome, Alaska called the Nome News. It was edited and managed by John Franklin Alexander Strong, who went on to be appointed the second governor of Alaska. In December, Strong purchased the Nome Chronicle and renamed it to the Nome Nugget. T.F. Kane was editor. It was a weekly four-page folio sold for fifty cents a copy.

The Steel brothers disposed of their interests in Dawson City and shipped one of their printing presses aboard the steamship Senator to Nome in May 1900. It was used to expand the weekly News into the Daily News, Nome's first daily paper. The Daily News was published and edited that July by Strong. It competed against two weeklies, the Arctic Weekly Sun and the Nome Gold Digger. The Daily News was considered the most popular while the other two struggled. Miners saw the News as a novelty and shared copies with their local paper upon their return home.

After a year, Charles E. Steel worked as manager while Strong continued as editor of the Daily News. The paper had both a daily edition and a weekly edition. In 1903, the Nugget under Strong was sued by the assistant district attorney of Nome for $50,000 in a libel case. In 1906, Strong sold the Nugget to a syndicate of Nome businessmen who appointed Harry G. Steel as editor and manager. The ownership group was led by William H. Bard, who also owned the News. Both papers were consolidated together following the sale.

George S. Maynard published the paper for 30 years. At one point he was elected mayor and installed the town's first radio receiving set. He died in 1939. The Nugget was then operated by his widow for a few years. The paper went on hiatus in January 1943 due to World War II. Mrs. Maynard then moved Juneau, Alaska.

The Nugget resumed publication October. At that time it was operated by W.A. Boucher, Jay Smith and Emily Boucher. Mrs. Emily Polet Boucher operated the paper for 20 years. She sold it in 1963 to James O. Sullivan, owner of the Unalakleet Trading Post. Mrs. Boucher owned a real estate rental firm and died that November. Al Phelps of Salem, Oregon was named editor and manager a year later. In 1966, Charles F. Willis, president and general manager of Alaska Airlines, purchased the Nugget. In 1971, Willis sold the paper to its editor, Albro B. Gregory.

Gregory was a local legend, a feisty editor who praised, provoked and piqued local readers. One Associated Press reporter described him a "elbow-bender extraordinaire." The "crusty publisher" who "crusaded against progress" who fought against the city replacing board walks with paved sidewalks and the paving of city streets. He argued against parking meters. As a prank, city officials installed a parking meter in front of his office in concrete. Gregory went so far as to threaten to build board sidewalk over the freshly laid concrete laid by the state.

Gregory retired after 11 years and handed over the paper in 1980 to his assistant of three years, Mark Furstenau. After 18 months, Furstenau sold the paper in December 1981 to Nancy L. McGuire. She was a stubborn reporter who took pride in being fair to all sides and refused to publish unsigned letters to the editor. In 2012, the Alaska Press Club presented McGuire with its First Amendment Award. After 34 years operating the paper, her last editorial was published the day after she died from cancer in 2016. Following her death, the Nugget was handled by her estate during purchase negotiations. It was sold in 2018 to Diana Haecker and Nils Hahn.

== Universal Pictures lawsuit ==
The Fourth Kind, a 2009 science fiction/horror film starring Milla Jovovich, was set in Nome, and to promote the film, Universal Pictures created a website with fake news stories supposedly taken from real Alaskan newspapers, including the Nugget and the Fairbanks Daily News-Miner. The newspapers sued Universal, eventually reaching a settlement where Universal would remove the fake stories and pay $20,000 to the Alaska Press Club and a $2,500 contribution to a scholarship fund for the Calista Corporation.
