= John Weir Troy =

American journalist and politician (1868-1942)

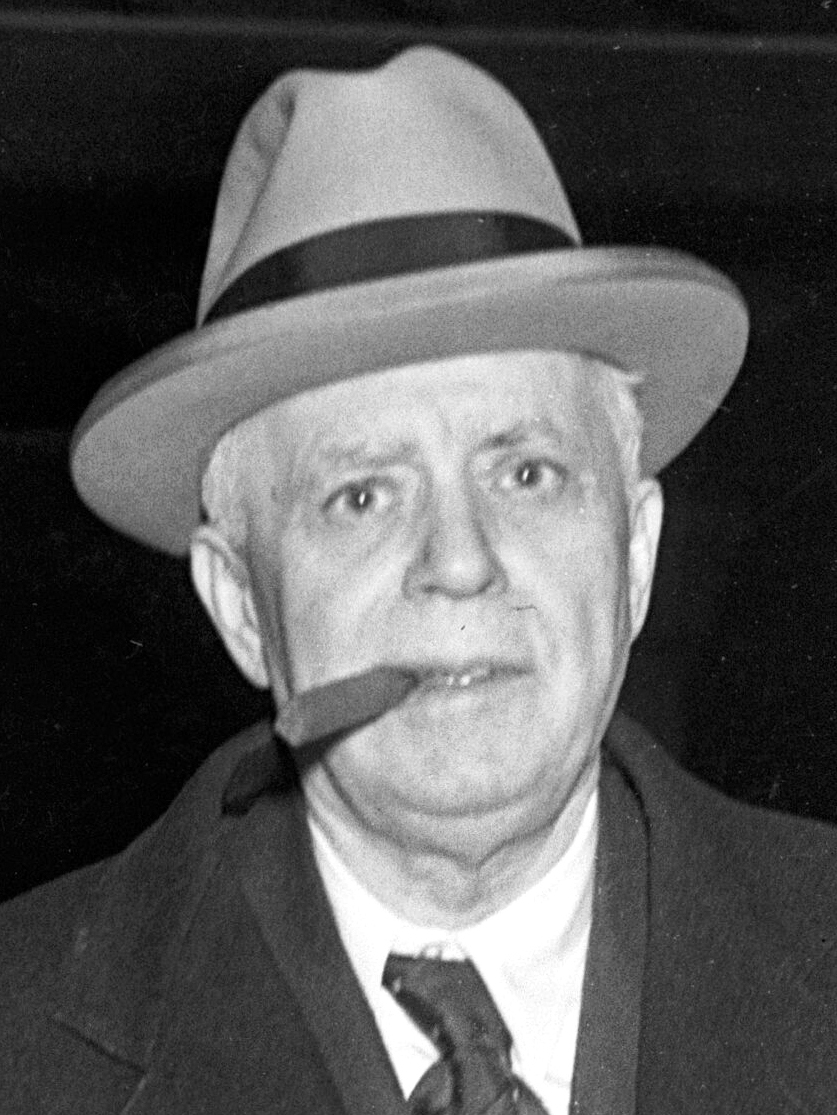
- Troy in 1935

6th Governor of Alaska Territory
- In office April 19, 1933 – December 6, 1939
- Nominated by: Franklin D. Roosevelt
- Lieutenant: Bob Bartlett
- Preceded by: George Alexander Parks
- Succeeded by: Ernest Gruening

Personal details
- Born: October 31, 1868 Dungeness, Washington
- Died: May 2, 1942 (aged 73) Juneau, Alaska
- Party: Democratic
- Profession: Newspaper publisher and editor

John Weir Troy (October 31, 1868 — May 2, 1942) was an American Democratic politician who was the Governor of Alaska Territory from 1933 to 1939. He was born in Dungeness, Washington and died in Juneau, Alaska.

John Troy began his professional career in journalism, starting as a newspaper reporter in Port Townsend, Washington, shortly after graduating from high school there. He would publish newspapers in Washington and Alaska between 1891 and 1914. He was the editor of Alaska-Yukon Magazine from 1911 to 1912. Following this, he was the editor of the Daily Alaskan Empire for twenty years before being appointed governor in 1933.

He was the father-in-law of George A. Lingo, who was the second husband of his younger daughter, Dorothy Minerva. At the time of their marriage, Lingo was a member of the Alaska Territorial House of Representatives and the board of trustees of the Alaska Agricultural College and School of Mines.

Political offices
Preceded by George Alexander Parks	Territorial Governor of Alaska; 1933—1939	Succeeded by Ernest Gruening
