= Walter Eli Clark =

American journalist (1869–1950)

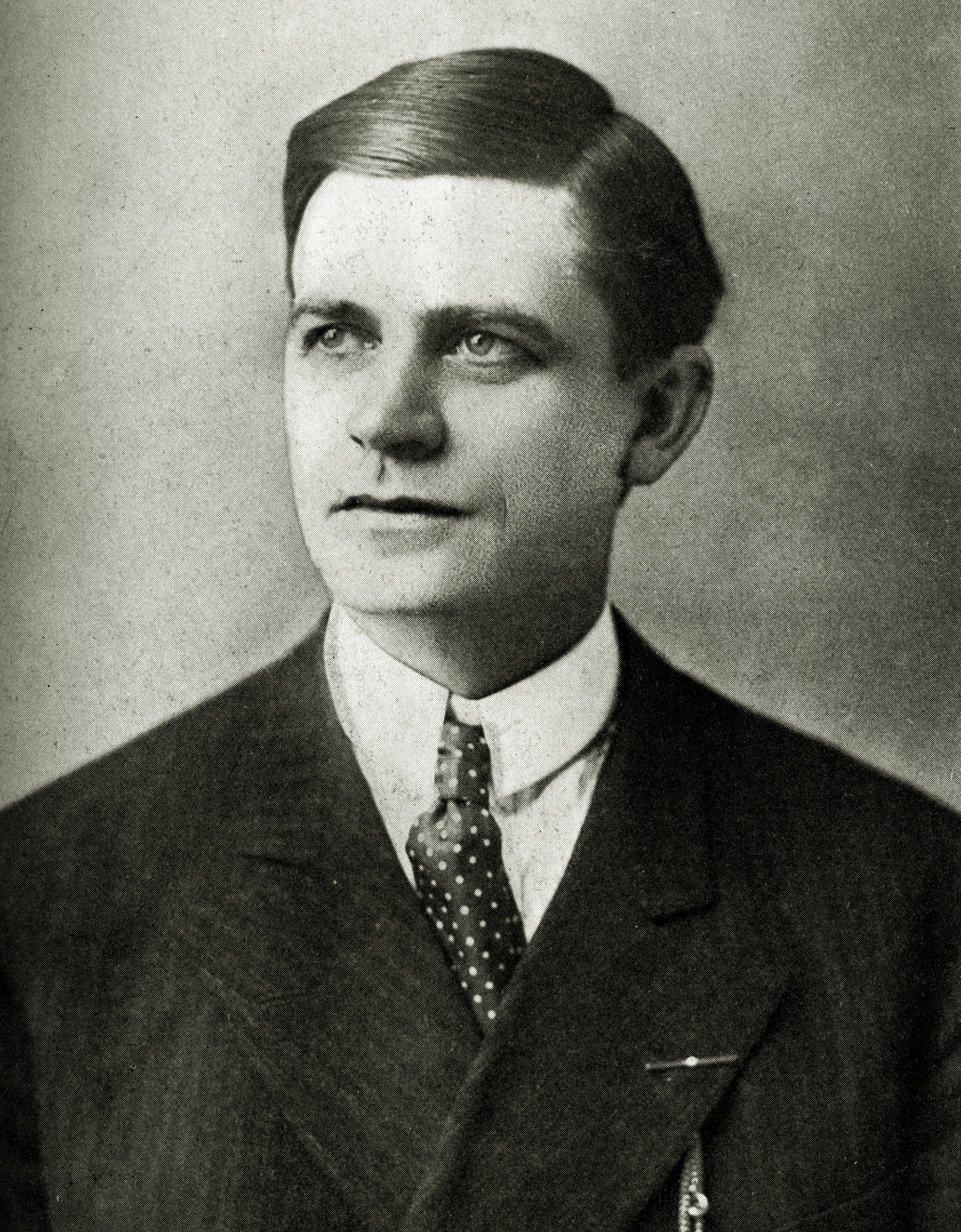

1st Governor of Alaska Territory
- In office August 24, 1912 – May 21, 1913
- Nominated by: William Howard Taft
- Preceded by: Position established
- Succeeded by: John Franklin Alexander Strong

7th Governor of District of Alaska
- In office May 18, 1909 – August 24, 1912
- Nominated by: William Howard Taft
- Preceded by: Wilford Bacon Hoggatt
- Succeeded by: Position abolished

Personal details
- Born: January 7, 1869 Ashford, Connecticut, U.S.
- Died: February 4, 1950 (aged 81) Charleston, West Virginia, U.S.
- Party: Republican
- Spouse(s): Lucy Harison Norvell (1889–1928); Juliet (Staunton) Clay (1929–1953)

Walter Eli Clark (January 7, 1869 – February 4, 1950) was an American journalist and newspaper publisher. In addition to his journalistic activities, he was the last Governor of the District of Alaska from 1909 to 1912, and the first Governor of Alaska Territory from 1912 to 1913.

== Background ==
Clark was born on January 7, 1869, to Oren Andrus and Jeannette (Jones) Clark in Ashford, Connecticut. He was educated in public school and in 1887 graduated from the Connecticut State Normal School (now Central Connecticut State University). Clark taught at a school in Waterville, Connecticut, before becoming Principal of Manchester, Connecticut's grade school. In 1891 he enrolled at Williston Seminary. From there he went to Wesleyan University and graduated with a Bachelor of Philosophy in 1895.

Following his graduation, Clark worked briefly in Hartford as a reporter for The Hartford Post. From there he moved to Washington, D.C., where he became a telegraph editor for the Washington Times. He followed this by a stint as a Washington correspondent for the New York Commercial Advertiser before joining The Sun's Washington bureau in 1897. Clark remained with The Sun until 1909, adding the roles of Washington correspondent for the Seattle Post-Intelligencer in 1900 and The Globe (Toronto) in 1904.

Clark married Lucy Harrison Norvell of Washington, D.C., on January 15, 1898.

== Alaska ==
Clark was appointed Governor of the District of Alaska by President William Howard Taft on May 18, 1909. The president considered the new governor to be knowledgeable about the district because Clark had prospected for gold near Nome, Alaska, for a short time in 1900 and traveled through the district in both 1903 and 1906. This view was however not universally held, with some Alaskans viewing the new governor as a carpetbagger.

As governor, Clark attempted to bring the district's various political factions together. One point where he differed from the majority of Alaskans was on the issue of territorial status, which the governor opposed. Clark's opposition was based upon Alaska's small population (36,556 whites) and the general lack of transportation infrastructure throughout the district. His opposition however became moot when Republicans lost control of the United States House of Representatives during the 1910 election. With the House under Democratic control, legislation granting Alaska territorial status was pushed through and became effective on August 24, 1912.

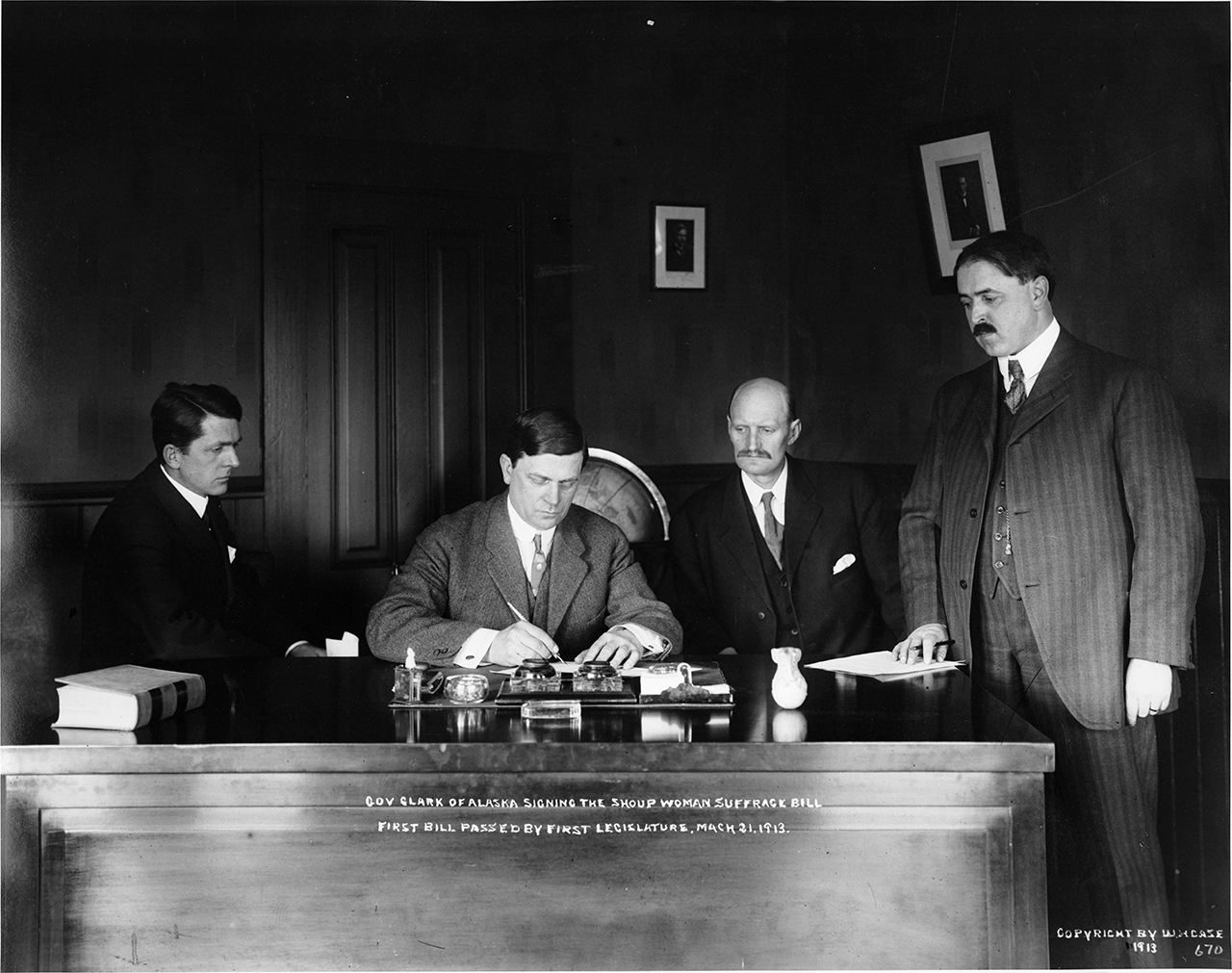
Alfred Shoup, Conrad Freeding, W.W. Shorthill watch Governor Walter E. Clark sign House Bill 2, giving Alaska women the right to vote, 21 March 1913.

During the territory's first legislative session, Clark signed laws creating a variety of regulatory agencies and implementing compulsory education, juvenile courts, eight-hour days for workers in many industries, and women's suffrage. The legislature also followed his recommendation to impose a tax on the canning of salmon. His last day in office came on May 21, 1913, when he resigned to make way for Wilson appointee John Franklin Alexander Strong.

== Later life ==
After leaving office, Clark moved to Charleston, West Virginia. There he purchased the News Mail and changed the paper's name to the Daily Mail. Clark served as publisher and editor in chief of the Daily Mail for the rest of his life.

Lucy Harrison Norvell Clark died in May 1928. The former governor remarried the next year, wedding Juliet (Staunton) Clay on August 13, 1929.

Socially he was a member of Charleston's Edgewood Club, the Metropolitan Club, the Arctic Club, and Washington's Chevy Chase Club. He was also cultivated an interest in rose cultivation. In this role he founded the Charleston Rose Society in 1922 and served as president of the American Rose Society in 1928 through 1929. Additionally he was a judge at the 1929 International Rose Show.

In 1945, Clark received an honorary Doctor of Letters from Wesleyan University. That same year he experienced a heart attack and suffered from poor health for the next five years. Clark died in Charleston from another heart attack on February 4, 1950.

After her husband's death, Juliet Staunton Clark took over the management of the newspaper. Three years later she was found brutally beaten to death in her Charleston home on August 21, 1953. Despite the Daily Mail offering a $15,000 reward, her killer has never been determined.

Political offices
Preceded by Wilford Bacon Hoggatt	District Governor of Alaska; 1909–1912	Succeeded by Walter Eli Clark (as Territorial Governor of Alaska)
Preceded by Walter Eli Clark (as District Governor of Alaska)	Territorial Governor of Alaska; 1912–1913	Succeeded by John Franklin Alexander Strong
