= George A. Lingo =

American politician (1901–1976)

- Born: 30 April 1901; Anaconda, Montana
- Died: 21 May 1976 (aged 75); Laguna Hills, California
- Citizenship: U.S.A.
- Education: Alaska Agricultural College and School of Mines
- Occupations: Entrepreneur, government official, member of the Alaska Territorial Legislature, artist
- Known for: Alaska pioneer
- Spouse: Dorothy Minerva (Troy) Morgan

George Archibald Lingo (April 30, 1901 – May 21, 1976) was an American Democratic politician from the territory (later state) of Alaska, commemorated as "a pioneer Alaskan in the true sense of the word."

A native of Anaconda, Montana, Lingo came to Alaska in 1918 with his parents, Mr. and Mrs. Archie Lingo. He finished high school in Seattle at Lincoln High, then entered the University of Washington. After a short UW student career, in 1923 he enrolled in the Alaska Agricultural College and School of Mines. He received a degree in mining engineering in 1927.

After graduation, he worked with the Mount McKinley Tourist and Transportation Company and was active in the Mount McKinley Tourist Organization, putting the mountain on the map as a tourist attraction as early as the late 1920s. In 1932 he was elected to the Alaska Territorial Legislature from Fairbanks as a representative of the 4th district; he was 31 at the time, the youngest man ever elected to the House and the first AAC&SM graduate to hold public office. He served two terms in the Alaska Territorial House of Representatives.

In 1934, he was appointed to the AAC&SM Board of Trustees. The following year, the Territorial Legislature, thanks in part to Lingo's efforts, changed the name of AAC&SM to the University of Alaska, and the Board of Trustees to the Board of Regents. He continued on the Board until 1943.

On May 15, 1935, he married Dorothy Minerva (Troy) Morgan, the younger daughter of then Governor John Weir Troy, in the Alaska Governor's Mansion in Juneau; they honeymooned in Mount McKinley Park. In September they moved to Anchorage, where he served as registrar and receiver in the U.S. Land Office, Third Division.

Shortly after the bombing of Pearl Harbor in 1941, Lingo enlisted in the U.S. Navy and was assigned to Naval Intelligence in Sitka. He retired from the Navy at the end of World War II in 1945 as a commander and moved back to Anchorage. He was a registered guide, worked on a tugboat in Southeastern Alaska, traveled by dogsled in interior Alaska, mined for gold all over Alaska, and built the first golf course in Anchorage.

Lingo ran for the Alaska Territorial Senate in 1954 as an independent candidate. He received only 895 votes out of a total of 22,177 cast for the two seats available in that election. The Democrats won both seats, defeating a Republican incumbent, Wasilla homesteader Gerrit "Heinie" Snider in the process.

In the 1950s, due to a severe bronchial condition, he and his wife moved to Palm Desert, California. He had counted painters Sydney Laurence and Eustace Ziegler as friends in Alaska, and in California he became active in oil painting, studying with some of the West's finest artists. Avid travelers, the Lingoes traveled twice around the world, and visited 60 countries. He died May 21, 1976, at Saddleback Community Hospital in Laguna Hills, California, after a history of heart trouble. The Alaska State Senate passed Senate Resolution No. 108 of the Ninth Legislature in the State of Alaska to note his death and memorialize his extended service to the state.
