= Senator Greene =

Senator Greene may refer to:

== Members of the United States Senate ==
- Albert C. Greene (1792–1863), U.S. Senator from Rhode Island from 1845 to 1851
- Ray Greene (politician) (1765–1849), U.S. Senator from Rhode Island from 1797 to 1801
- Frank L. Greene (1870–1930), U.S. Senator from Vermont from 1923 to 1930

== United States state senate members ==
- Bill Greene (1930–2002), California State Senate
- Chedrick Greene, Michigan State Senate
- Leroy F. Greene (1918–2002), California State Senate
- Thomas Greene (Iowa politician) (born 1949), Iowa State Senate
- Tom Greene (Louisiana politician) (born 1948), Louisiana State Senate
- Walter S. Greene (1834–1891), Wisconsin State Senate

== See also ==
- Senator Green (disambiguation)
