= Wilford Bacon Hoggatt =

American naval officer and sixth Governor of the District of Alaska (1865–1938)

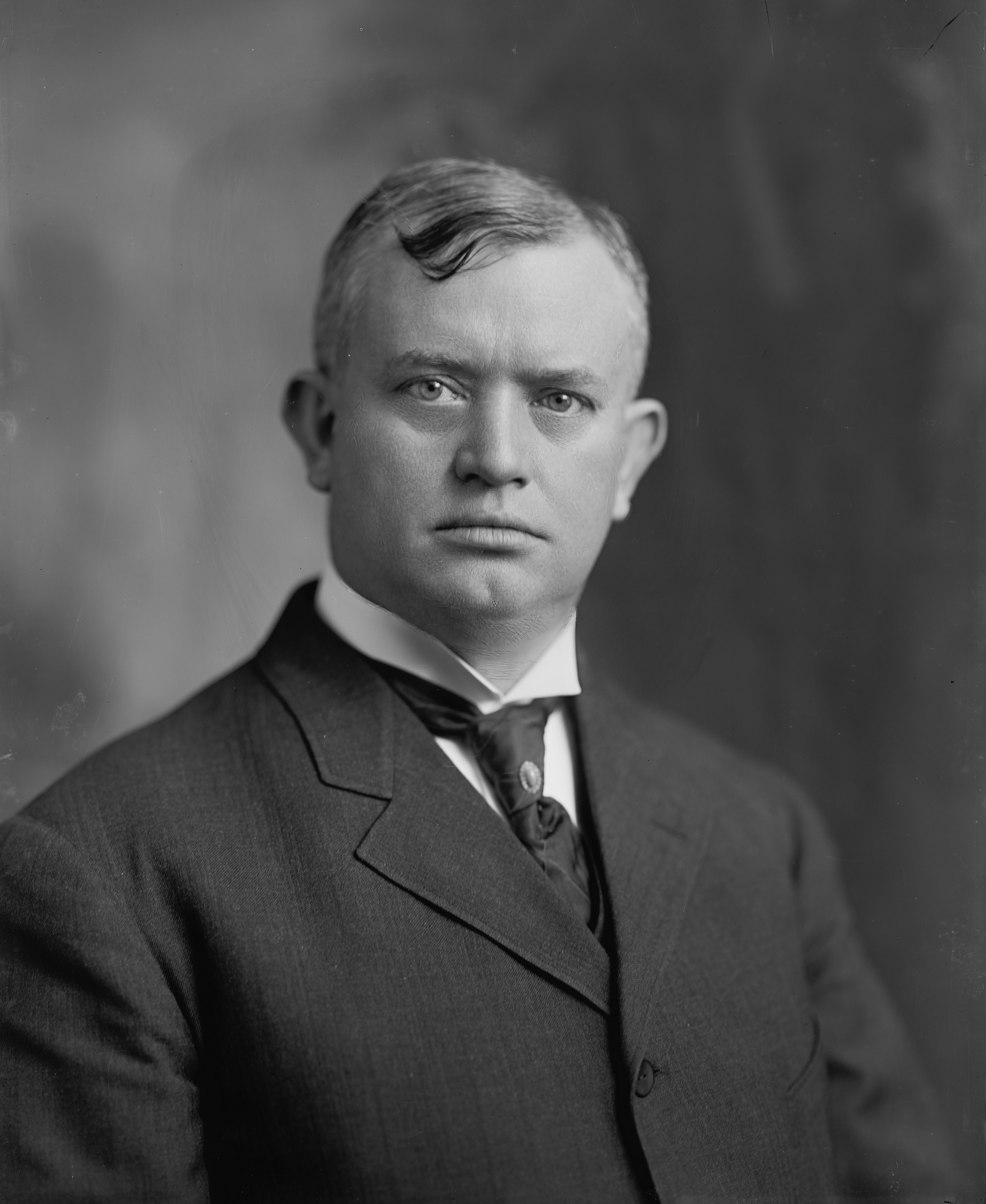

6th Governor of District of Alaska
- In office March 10, 1906 – May 18, 1909
- Nominated by: Theodore Roosevelt
- Preceded by: John Green Brady
- Succeeded by: Walter Eli Clark

Personal details
- Born: September 11, 1865 Paoli, Indiana, U.S.
- Died: February 26, 1938 (aged 72) New York City, U.S.
- Party: Republican
- Spouse(s): Marie Hayden (1893–1900); Clarissa E. Millard (1908–)

Wilford Bacon Hoggatt (September 11, 1865 – February 26, 1938) was an American naval officer and businessman who served as the sixth Governor of the District of Alaska.

== Background ==
Hoggatt was born to Isabell (Bacon) and William M Hoggatt on September 11, 1865, in Paoli, Indiana. He attended the United States Naval Academy, graduating in June 1884 before beginning his career as a naval officer. In 1889 Hoggatt received a four-year assignment to the United States Coast and Geodetic Survey, in which he surveyed the coastal waters of southeastern Alaska.

On June 12, 1893, Hoggatt married Marie Hayden of St. Louis in Washington D.C. The marriage lasted until her death in 1900. In June 1893, he graduated from the Columbian University Law School of the District of Columbia (now George Washington University Law School) with an LL.B. He then served as a legal officer in the Judge Advocate General's Corps and as Assistant Chief of the Bureau of Equipment at the United States Naval Observatory. During the Spanish–American War, Hoggatt was appointed to the Naval Board of Strategy by President William McKinley.

Hoggatt resigned from the U.S. Navy in August 1898 and enrolled in the Columbia School of Mines. After a year, he moved with his brother Herbert to Juneau, Alaska. There the pair purchased some mining claims and established the Juneau Mines Company at nearby Berners Bay. The business was a financial success and Hoggatt served as the company's manager.

== Governorship ==
President Theodore Roosevelt appointed Hoggatt Governor of the District of Alaska on March 10, 1906. The new governor remarried on February 25 of the next year. His second marriage, to Clarissa Eames Millard of Utica, New York, produced three daughters: Clarissa, Isabelle, and Elinor.

The new governor was a strong proponent of economic development, with expanded coal mining being a focus of his efforts. He viewed coal as a useful energy source and needed material for establishing railroads within the district. Hoggatt was thwarted in his efforts however, first by the U.S. Congress, who were looking to control the growth of new monopolies, passing legislation limiting the size of mining districts. Then in November 1906, President Roosevelt barred all coal-mining on public lands. As the vast majority of Alaska was owned by the federal government, this effectively prohibited coal mining in Alaska.

Another frustration for Hoggatt was his inability to convince the federal legislature to revise surveying laws. This created problems for homesteaders and gold miners wishing to move to Alaska. Hoggatt did oversee the move of Alaska's capital from Sitka to Juneau. In a break with the majority of the district's population, the governor opposed granting territorial status. This was due to Hoggatt fearing that potential new taxes created by a territorial legislature would discourage further economic development.

The end of Hoggatt's term as governor came on May 18, 1909, when he resigned to make way for President William Howard Taft's appointment of Walter Eli Clark.

== Later life ==
Following his term in office, Hoggart returned to his position as a mining manager. He stayed there until 1912 when he became President of the Keyes Product Company in New London, Connecticut. Hoggart remained with the fiber board manufacturer until the company's dissolution in 1926. The former governor then moved to New York City where he spent the rest of his life, the final two years in declining health. Hoggart died on February 26, 1938, in The Bronx. He was buried in Utica, New York.

Political offices
Preceded by John Green Brady	District Governor of Alaska; 1906–1909	Succeeded by Walter Eli Clark
