= Thomas Riggs Jr. =

American politician (1873–1945)

Thomas W. Riggs Jr.
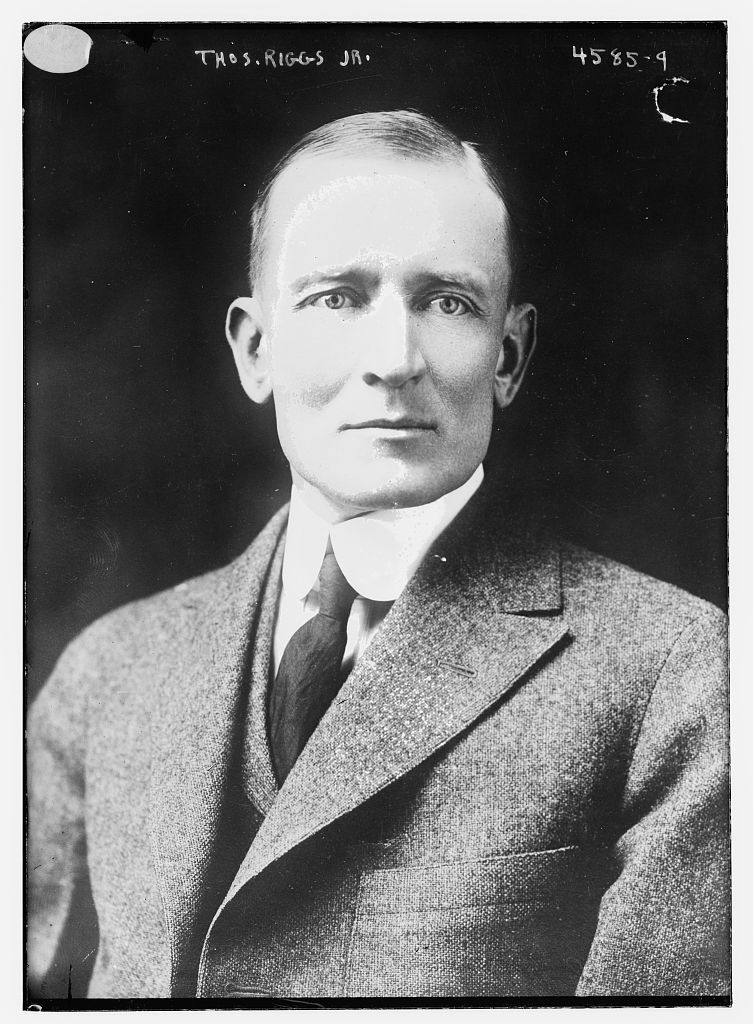
- Riggs in 1918

3rd Governor of Alaska Territory
- In office April 12, 1918 – June 15, 1921
- Nominated by: Woodrow Wilson
- Preceded by: J. F. A. Strong
- Succeeded by: Scott Cordelle Bone

Personal details
- Born: October 17, 1873 Ilchester, Maryland, U.S.
- Died: January 16, 1945 (aged 71) Washington, D.C., U.S.
- Resting place: Green Mount Cemetery; Baltimore, Maryland, U.S.
- Party: Democratic
- Spouse: Renée Marie Coudert
- Education: Princeton University

Thomas W. Riggs Jr. (October 17, 1873 – January 16, 1945) was an American engineer who worked extensively in Alaska Territory, first as a leader of the team which surveyed the Alaska-Canada border and later as a Commissioner oversee construction of the Alaska Railroad. He was appointed Governor of Alaska Territory and served from 1918 till 1921. During his later life, Riggs served as United States Commissioner to the International Boundary Commission.

== Background ==
Riggs was born to Thomas and Catherine Winter (Gilbert) Riggs on October 17, 1873, in Ilchester, Maryland. He was educated at the Emerson Institute and a variety of other private schools located in both the United States and Germany. He studied civil engineering at Princeton University, graduating in 1894.

Following graduation he moved with his family to Washington state and took a job as a newspaper reporter in Tacoma. In 1896, he joined his family's lumber business in Bucoda before joining the Klondike Gold Rush the next year. From 1897 to 1901, Riggs prospected for gold near both Dawson City and Nome, Alaska, with little success. From 1901 to 1903 he worked as a mining engineer in Idaho, Montana, and Utah.

In 1903, Riggs joined the United States and Canada Boundary Survey. From 1906 to 1913, he worked on the team assigned to survey the Alaska-Canada border and advanced from the position of surveyor to become the United States Engineer-in-Charge. During this effort, the team surveyed the boundary from the Pacific to Arctic Oceans, placed boundary markers, and cleared wooded areas to provide a clear line of sight between markers.

Riggs married Renée Marie Coudert on April 30, 1913, in New York City. The marriage produced two children: Elizabeth C. and Thomas III. Renée compiled native Inuit stories in an anthology during their time in Alaska.

Following his work surveying the Alaska-Canada border, on May 4, 1914, Riggs was appointed by President Woodrow Wilson to the Alaskan Railroad Commission. Along with the other two commissioners he oversaw the construction of the Alaska Railroad, Riggs being responsible for the Fairbanks division.

== Governorship ==
United States Secretary of the Interior Franklin Knight Lane was impressed by Riggs' experience and recommended his appointment as Governor of Alaska Territory to President Woodrow Wilson. Following his confirmation, the new governor was sworn into office on April 12, 1918.

The United States had already entered the First World War by the time he entered office and the new governor encouraged Alaska to support the war effort. Under Riggs, the territory was a leader in the sale of both war savings stamps and Liberty Bonds. The new governor also worked to decrease overlaps between the territorial and federal governmental functions. He was successful in the areas of education, mine inspections, and road building but met strong resistance in his efforts to consolidate efforts within Alaska's United States General Land Office.

Transportation was a major problem within the territory, with Riggs believing private shipping firms were providing unfair and inadequate service to Alaska. To rectify this problem, he proposed Alaska establish a fleet of transport ships and begin a territorial shipping service. The territorial legislature approved the plan but the U.S. Congress blocked it before the fleet could be established.

To deal with the Spanish flu, In October 1918 Riggs ordered doctors to meet arriving steamships upon arrival to inspect for signs of the virus and that transport firms refuse passage to the territory by anyone who was ill. The precautions were unsuccessful with the first case reaching Juneau on October 14 and widespread outbreaks being present a month later. In response to the flu's arrival, Riggs established a cordon sanitaire on all trails to the interior, but unfortunately the couriers carrying announcements of the quarantine may have also spread the disease. The native population proved especially vulnerable, with up to an eight percent mortality rate during the pandemic. This left hundreds of orphans and entire villages whose populations were unable to perform basic activities such as prepare meals or chop firewood. In response, Riggs exceeded authorized funding levels in his spending on medical supplies, maintaining the quarantine, and providing relief efforts. The territory's financial situation was further complicated when a request for a US$200,000 special allocation was cut in half by the U.S. Senate and rejected completely by the U.S. House of Representatives.

The end of his term of office came after the election of Warren Harding as President of the United States. Riggs left office on June 15, 1921, making way for Republican appointee Scott Cordelle Bone.

== Later life ==
Following his time in office, Riggs moved to New York State, establishing his residence in Millbrook and an office in New York City. There he worked in the mining, oil, and construction industries and was named Vice-President of Macassa Mines, Ltd. of Canada. On August 2, 1935, Riggs was named the United States Commissioner to the International Boundary Commission.

Riggs died on January 16, 1945, in Washington D.C. He was buried at Green Mount Cemetery in Baltimore, Maryland.

Political offices
Preceded by John Franklin Alexander Strong	Territorial Governor of Alaska; 1918–1921	Succeeded by Scott Cordelle Bone
