= Scott Cordelle Bone =

American politician

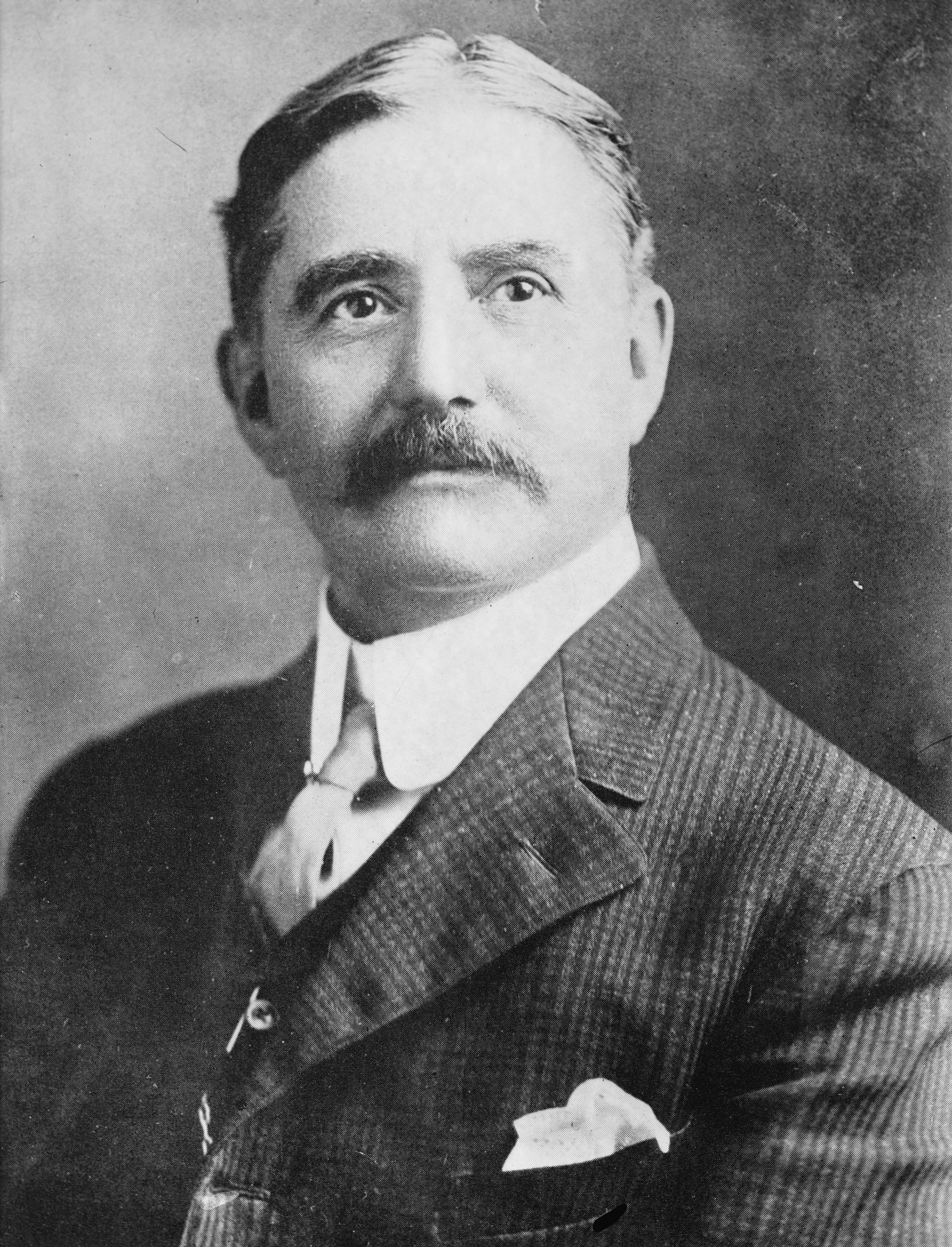

4th Governor of Alaska Territory
- In office June 15, 1921 – June 16, 1925
- Nominated by: Warren G. Harding
- Preceded by: Thomas Riggs Jr.
- Succeeded by: George Alexander Parks

Personal details
- Born: February 15, 1860 Shelby County, Indiana, U.S.
- Died: January 26, 1936 (aged 75) Santa Barbara, California, U.S.
- Party: Republican
- Spouse: Mary Worth

Scott Cardelle Bone (February 15, 1860 – January 26, 1936) was the fourth Territorial Governor of Alaska, serving from 1921 to 1925. A Republican, he was appointed by President Warren G. Harding. He is perhaps best known for making the decision to use dog sleds to transport diphtheria antitoxin 674 miles rather than use a plane in the now-famous 1925 Serum Run, (also known as the "Great Race of Mercy") from which the Iditarod Trail Sled Dog Race stems.

Bone was born in Shelby County, Indiana. He belonged to numerous organizations and held almost as many positions, such as: chairman of the Alaska Bureau of the Seattle Chamber of Commerce, delegate-at-large to the Republican National Convention, member (and at one time president of) the Gridiron Club, member of the National Press Association, director of publicity for the Republican National Committee, life member of the Red Cross, the Yacht and Country Club of Tampa, Florida, and the Decorated Order of Sacred Treasure of Japan, and a member of the Elks.

He was the editor of The Washington Post, founded The Washington Herald and later was the editor of the Seattle Post-Intelligencer. He was a friend of Pres. Warren G. Harding, Pres. William Howard Taft, Pres. Theodore Roosevelt, and Alice Roosevelt.

He hosted President Harding and his entourage while they visited Alaska in July 1923.

== Books ==
- Alaska, Its Past, Present, and Future
- Chechahco and Sourdough: A Story of Alaska
- Sketches of Statesmen
- Political Remembrances

== See also ==
- 1925 serum run to Nome

Political offices
Preceded by Thomas Riggs Jr.	Territorial Governor of Alaska; 1921–1925	Succeeded by George Alexander Parks
