= George Alexander Parks =

American engineer and 5th Governor of Alaska Territory (1883-1984)

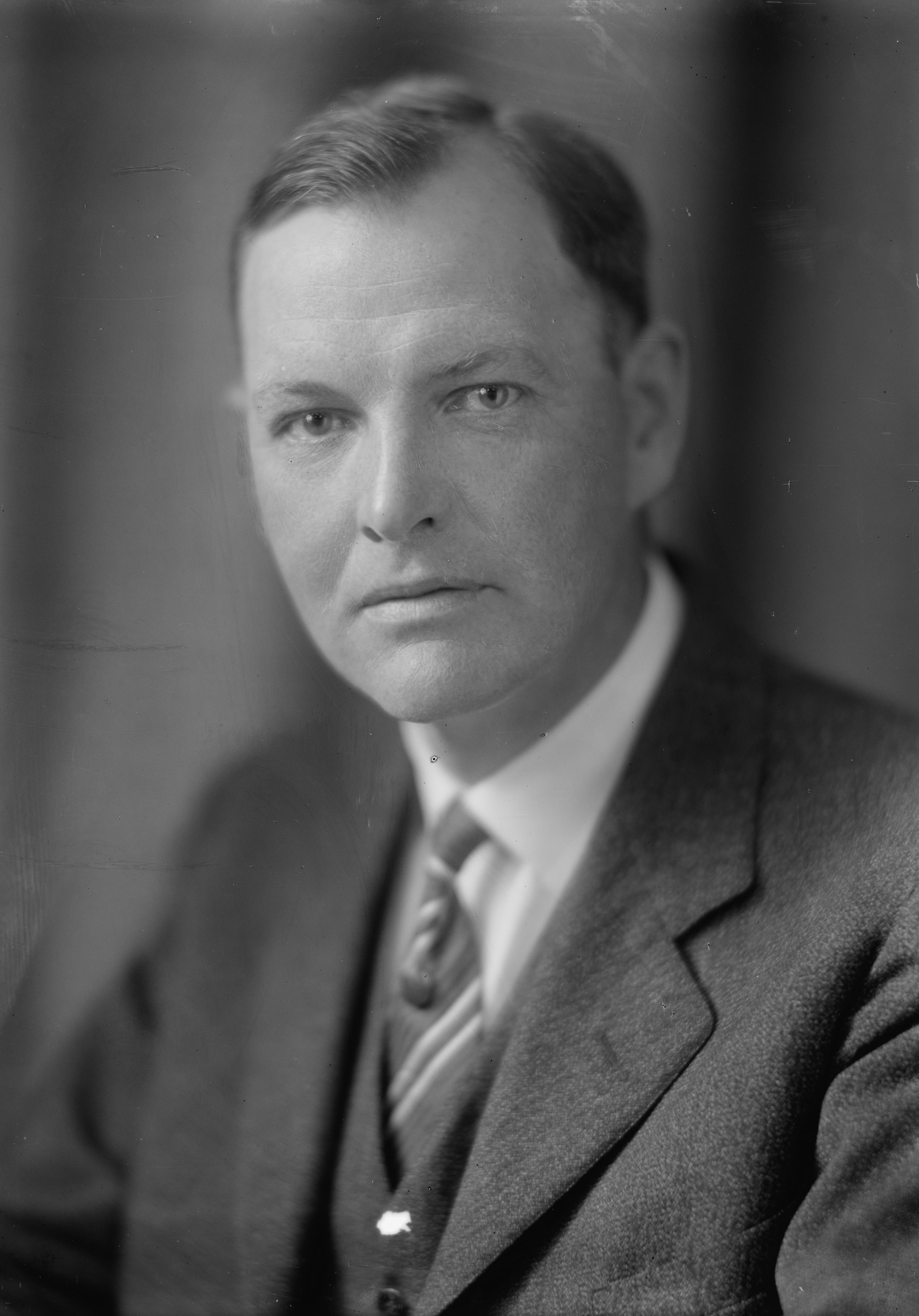

5th Governor of Alaska Territory
- In office June 17, 1925 – April 19, 1933
- Nominated by: Calvin Coolidge
- Preceded by: Scott Cordelle Bone
- Succeeded by: John Weir Troy

Personal details
- Born: May 29, 1883 Denver, Colorado, U.S.
- Died: May 11, 1984 (aged 100) Juneau, Alaska, U.S.
- Party: Republican
- Profession: Mining engineer, Cadastre

George Alexander Parks (May 29, 1883 – May 11, 1984) was an American engineer who worked in Alaska Territory for most of his career. Following an unexpected nomination from President Calvin Coolidge, he became the territory's first resident governor. As governor, he was the first person to serve two complete four-year terms and the first chief executive to travel extensively by air.

== Background ==
Parks was born to James and Mary Leach (Ferguson) Parks on May 29, 1883, in Denver, Colorado. He was educated in public schools before graduating from the Colorado School of Mines in 1906. After graduation, he worked as a mining engineer in Canada, Mexico, and the Western United States before arriving in Alaska in 1907 as part of an engineering team tasked with making evaluations for a group of investors.

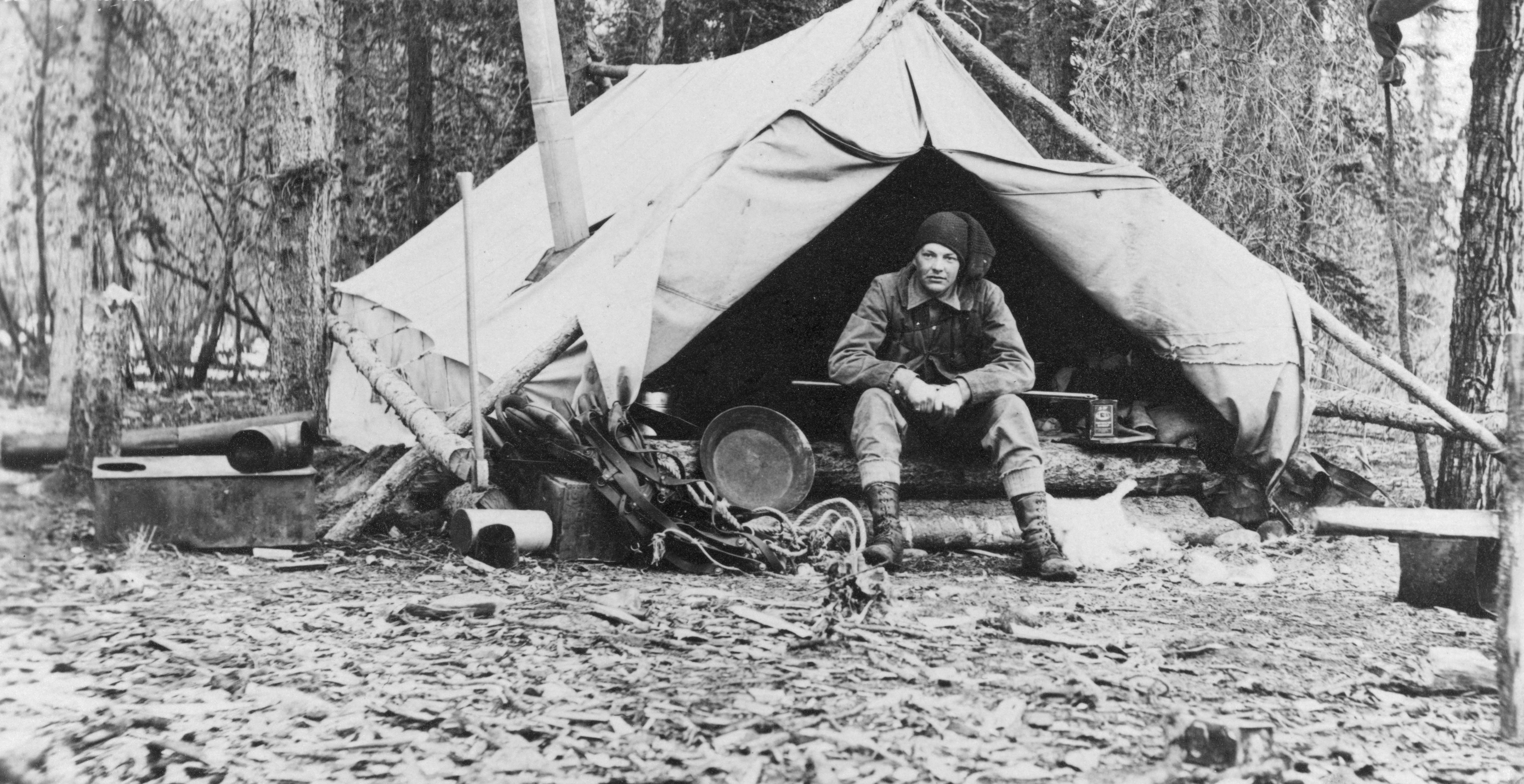
Parks in a field camp, c. 1915

In 1908, Parks worked for the United States Land Office in Denver as a mineral examiner for two months before taking a similar position in Alaska. Following the American entry into World War I, he joined the Army Corps of Engineers. Rising to the rank of captain by the war's end, he returned to the Land office after his military service.

In 1920, Parks was appointed Chief of the United States Land Office in Juneau. Four years later he was in Anchorage working as Assistant Supervisor of Surveys of Public Lands for Alaska. During his time with the land office, he traveled extensively throughout the territory, gaining an intimate knowledge of the geography and becoming acquainted with both the white and indigenous populations of Alaska.

== Governorship ==
While President Warren G. Harding, Hubert Work, and President Herbert Hoover were visiting Alaska, Parks was assigned as a tour guide for the dignitaries. The group was impressed by their guide's detailed knowledge of the territory. When President Calvin Coolidge was later looking for a new territorial governor, Work and Hoover, who by then were both members of the Presidential Cabinet, recommended Parks. Coolidge nominated Parks to be Governor of Alaska Territory on February 14, 1925, and the new governor took his oath of office on June 17, 1925.

Transportation was a major issue for the territory during the Parks administration. To offset running deficits and reduced federal subsidies, rates for the Alaska Railroad were raised and a toll was implemented on the Richardson Highway. One area that saw an improvement however was air travel. In 1925 funds for landing fields was authorized by the territorial legislature. Two years later subsidized air travel between the Alaska Railroad and Seward Peninsula was initiated. Parks became an avid enthusiast of air travel, using it to inspect much of the territory in May and June 1929. The speed and increased mobility even allowed him to attend his niece's graduation in California.

Much of Parks' term of office was largely uneventful. Among the issues he dealt with were the reduction in federal funding for the United States Geological Survey and elimination of the territory's agricultural experimentation stations. He also initiated a contest among school children to design a territorial flag.

Parks was reappointed for a second term by President Hoover on September 27, 1929. He left office on April 19, 1933, following the completion of his term.

== Later life ==
After leaving the governor's office, Parks settled in Juneau and became District Cadastral Engineer of Alaska. He remained there until his retirement from the Bureau of Land Management in July 1948. After leaving government service, he worked for the R.J. Sommers Construction Company and became Vice-President of the First National Bank of Juneau.

Parks never married. During the mid-1970s, Parks was forced to leave his Juneau apartment and move into a nursing home. In 1975, the Parks Highway (Alaska Route 3) between Anchorage and Fairbanks, Alaska, was named in his honor. Parks died on May 11, 1984, at the age of 100 in Juneau, Alaska.

Political offices
Preceded by Scott Cordelle Bone	Territorial Governor of Alaska; 1925–1933	Succeeded by John Weir Troy
Honorary titles
Preceded by William H. McMaster	Earliest serving US governor 1968–1984	Succeeded by Alfred M. Landon
