= John Green (judge) =

American lawyer and judge (1807–1877)

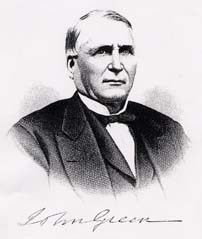
- Judge John Green

Member of the Indiana Senate
- In office 1857 – 1859; 1869–1871

Indiana Common Pleas Court Judge
- In office 1860–1864

Personal details
- Born: May 20, 1807 Yancey County, North Carolina, US
- Died: August 31, 1887 (aged 80) Tipton County, Indiana, US
- Resting place: Fairview Cemetery
- Party: Republican
- Spouse(s): Mary Marshall (1829-1865); Catherine A. Humerrikhouse (1866-1875); Caroline Passwater
- Occupation: Judge
- Profession: Law
- Committees: Committee on the Organization of Courts, Swamp Land Committee

John Green (May 20, 1807 – August 31, 1887) was an Indiana lawyer, judge and politician. He was a member of the Whig Party (United States) until its dissolution, at which time he joined the early modern day Republican Party (United States). He served as a member of the Indiana State Senate (1857–59, 1869–71), as a common pleas court judge (1860–64), and as an alternate delegate to the Republican National Convention (1868).

== Early life and education ==
John Green was born May 20, 1807, to James and Catherine Green in Yancey County, North Carolina. Both of his grandfathers were veterans of the Revolutionary War. Green's parents moved to the Indiana Territory in 1810 and settled in Jefferson County. During the War of 1812 his father was enrolled as a ranger, or home-guard.

Between 1828 and 1838, beginning one year after its establishment, he entered Hanover College the oldest private college in Indiana. He began his college education with ministry in mind, but later changed his mind. In 1832 settled in Tipton, Indiana and pursued a career in farming until 1839, when he began studying law under the Honorable Lyle Wilberforce of Madison, Indiana. In 1842 he was licensed to practice law and was later admitted to practice in the Federal and Supreme Courts.

== Career ==
In 1856 he was first elected to the Indiana State Senate and served four years. While a member of the Upper House he was chairman of the Swamp Land Committee. After his term he was elected Judge of the Common Pleas Court for four years. He was then re-elected in 1868 to the State Senate and was named as chairman of the Committee on the Organization of Courts.

== Personal life ==
A three-time widower, he was married to: Mary Marshall (1829–1865) of Jefferson County, widow of Robert Marshall, Catherine A. Humerrikhouse (?–1875), and Caroline Passwater (daughter of a Judge Cottingham).

He was also the adoptive parent of John Green Brady (May 25, 1847 – December 17, 1918) who was an American politician and the Governor of the District of Alaska from 1897 to 1906.

=== Death ===
He died in Tipton County, Indiana, on August 31, 1887, and was interred in Fairview Cemetery.
