= Homer News =

Weekly newspaper in Alaska, U.S.

- Type: Weekly newspaper
- Format: Tabloid
- Owner: Carpenter Media Group
- Founder(s): Hall and Marion Thorn
- Editor: Delcenia Cosman
- Founded: 1964
- Language: English
- Headquarters: 3482 Landings St. Homer, Alaska 99603-7999; United States
- Circulation: 1,205 (as of 2023)
- Sister newspapers: Juneau Empire; Peninsula Clarion
- ISSN: 1095-9408
- Website: homernews.com

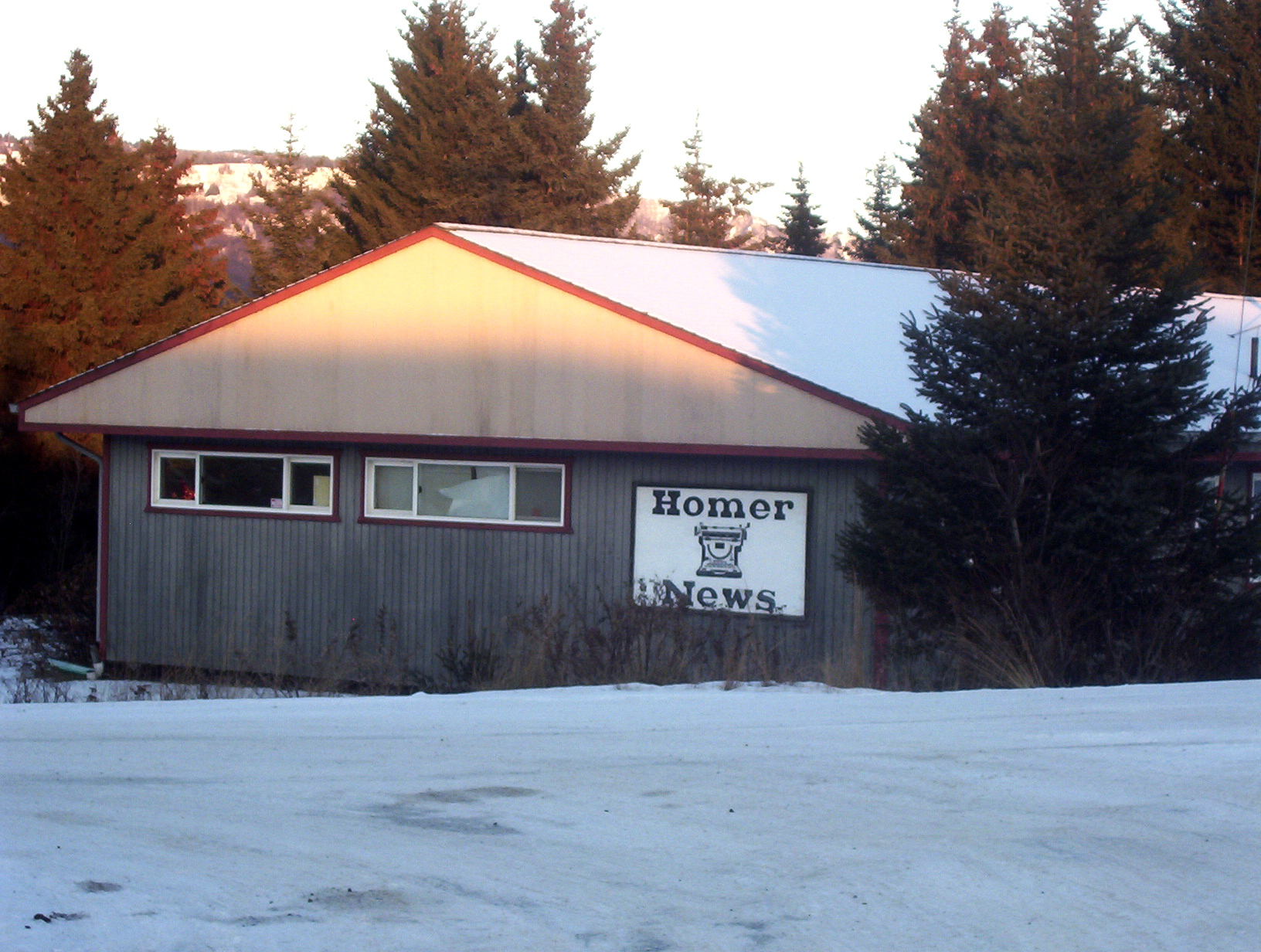
Homer News offices

The Homer News is a weekly newspaper published in Homer, Alaska since 1964.

== History ==
On January 4, 1964, Hall and Marion Thorn published the first edition of the Homer News. The initial press run was 600. Previously, there was another paper called the Homer News founded in the 1950s by H.W. and W.H. Hegdahl, but after a few years they renamed it to the Kenai Peninsula Pioneer. The Thorns, for their paper, adopted the motto of the Hegdahls, "Aims for Progress." In 1969, employee Gertrude Lucille Billings bought the paper, and on the masthead listed her name as "Girl Friday." She sold it in 1973 to Larry and Linda Gjosund, who renamed the paper to the Homer Weekly News. Homer mayor Gary Williams acquired the paper on July 1, 1974, and changed the name back to the Homer News.

Williams sold the News in January 1978 to Howard and Tod Simons, and Tom Gibboney. Gibboney was managing editor of the Anchorage Daily News. Under him, the Anchorage paper won a Pulitzer Prize. Gibboney resigned following the sale to operate the Homer paper. Howard Simons was managing editor of The Washington Post and directed the Pultizer Prize winning investigation of the Watergate scandal. He lived with his wife Tod Simons in Washington, D.C. The sale came about as Simons was in town for a bird-watching trip and discussed buying the paper over a couple of beers with Gibboney, who was friends with Williams. Looking back, Gibboney later said "We basically brought a more professional approach to the paper.

In 1988, Gibboney left the paper and moved to Menlo Park, California. In 1989, Howard Simons died. In 2000, Morris Communications acquired the Homer News from Gibboney and Martin and Nancy Cohen. At that time the paper's circulation was 3,800. Morris had previously purchased two other Alaskan papers, the Juneau Empire and Peninsula Clarion. In 2017, Morris sold its newspapers to GateHouse Media. In 2018, GateHouse sold its Alaska papers to Sound Publications, a subsidiary of Black Press Media. The company was acquired in March 2024 by Carpenter Media Group. In October 2024, the newspaper sold its office building.
