= Territory of Alaska =

Territory of the United States (1912–1959)

Coordinates: 64°N 153°W

- Organized incorporated territory of the United States
- 1912–1959
- Flag Seal

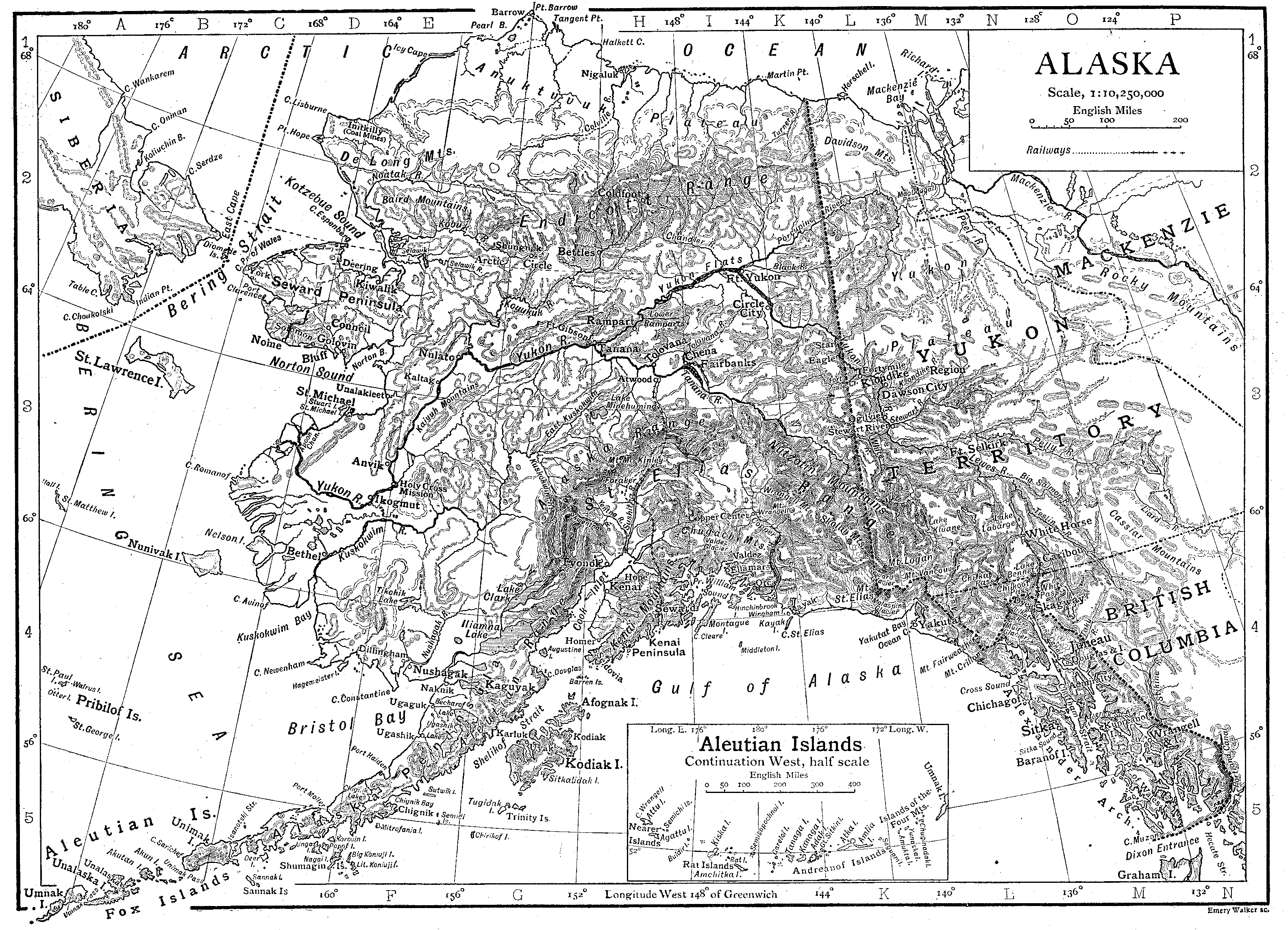
- Map of the Territory of Alaska
- Capital: Juneau
- Government
  - Type: Organized incorporated territory
- History
  - Territory of Alaska: August 24 1912
  - Alaska Statehood Act: January 3 1959
Preceded by	Succeeded by
District of Alaska	Alaska
- Today part of: United States

The Territory of Alaska or Alaska Territory was an organized incorporated territory of the United States from August 24, 1912, until Alaska was granted statehood on January 3, 1959. The territory was previously Russian America, 1784–1867; the Department of Alaska, 1867–1884; and the District of Alaska, 1884–1912.

== Origin ==
Historical population
Year	Pop.	±%
1920	55,036	—
1930	59,278	+7.7%
1940	72,524	+22.3%
1950	128,643	+77.4%
Source: 1920–1950;

Passage of the 1899 Criminal Code which, among other things, included a tax on liquor, led to increased calls for Alaskan representation in Congress, and the debate finally ended on August 24, 1912, when the Alaska District became an organized, incorporated territory of the United States.

The Second Organic Act of 1912 renamed the District to the Territory of Alaska. By 1916, its population was about 58,000. James Wickersham, a Delegate to Congress, introduced Alaska's first statehood bill, but it failed for lack of interest from Alaskans. Even President Warren G. Harding's unprecedented visit in 1923 (just days before his death) could not create widespread interest in statehood. Under the conditions of the Second Organic Act, Alaska had been split into four divisions. The most populous of the divisions, whose capital was Juneau, wondered if it could become a separate state from the other three. Government control was a primary concern, with the territory having 52 federal agencies governing it.

== Middle 20th century ==
In 1920, the Jones Act required U.S.-flagged vessels to be built in the United States, owned by U.S. citizens and documented under the laws of the United States. All goods entering or leaving Alaska had to be transported by American carriers and shipped to Seattle prior to further shipment, making Alaska a de facto dependent of the commerce on the state of Washington. The U.S. Supreme Court ruled that the provision of the Constitution saying one state should not hold sway over another's commerce did not apply because Alaska was only a territory. The prices Seattle's shipping businesses charged began to rise to take advantage of the situation.

The Great Depression caused prices of fish and copper, which were vital to Alaska's economy at the time, to decline. Wages were dropped and the workforce decreased by more than half. In the mid-1930s, President Franklin D. Roosevelt thought Americans from agricultural areas could be transferred to Alaska's Matanuska-Susitna Valley for a fresh chance at agricultural self-sustainment. Colonists were largely from northern states in the Upper Midwest, such as Michigan, Wisconsin, and Minnesota under the belief that only those who grew up with climates similar to that of Alaska's could handle settler life there. The United Congo Improvement Association asked the president to settle 400 African-American farmers in Alaska, saying that the territory would offer full political rights, but racial prejudice and the belief that only those from northern states would make suitable colonists caused the proposal to fail.

The exploration and settlement of Alaska would not have been possible without the development of aircraft, which allowed for the influx of settlers into the state's interior, and rapid transportation of people and supplies throughout. However, owing to unfavorable weather conditions and the high ratio of pilots to population, over 1,700 aircraft wreck sites are scattered throughout Alaska. Numerous wrecks also trace their origins to the military build-up of the state during both World War II and the Cold War.

Alaska's strategic importance to the United States became more apparent during World War II. In April 1942, over 200 people of Japanese origin in the territory were forcibly removed and sent to internment camps inland as a result of Executive Order 9066, which authorized the government to evict and intern any person of Japanese descent from the Pacific Coast. From June 1942 until August 1943 the Japanese invaded the U.S. by way of the Aleutian Islands chain, in the Battle of the Aleutian Islands. This marked the first time since the War of 1812 that American soil was occupied by a foreign enemy. The Japanese were eventually repelled from the Aleutian Islands by a force of 34,000 American troops.

In the spring and summer of 1945, Cold Bay on the Alaska Peninsula was the site of the largest and most ambitious transfer program of World War II, Project Hula, in which the United States transferred 149 ships and craft to the Soviet Union and trained 12,000 Soviet personnel in their operation in anticipation of the Soviet Union entering the war against Japan. At any given time, about 1,500 American personnel were at Cold Bay and Fort Randall during Project Hula.

== Social dynamics ==
During the territorial legislature's first session in 1913 a variety of reforms were undertaken including: allowing women to vote, creating an 8-hour work day and other labor regulations, gave autonomy to some Native Alaskan villages, created a board in the territory for education and regulated mining conditions.

The territory did give some Native Alaskans the right to vote in 1915 under the condition that they "gave up tribal customs and traditions." Alaska did not ratify the 19th Amendment as it was a territory. Racial segregation was practiced in Territorial Alaska toward Native Alaskans lasting until 1945 when the Alaska Equal Rights Act of 1945 was signed into law banning racial segregation and discrimination making it the first law of its kind in the United States.

In 1958 the US Census Bureau estimated that the population of Alaska (civilian only) was at approximately 158,000.

== Statehood ==
On January 3, 1959, Alaska became the 49th state. There was some delay because of concern by members of the national Republican Party that Alaska would elect Democratic Party members to Congress, in contrast to Hawaii, which was also a contender for statehood at the same time and thought to have Republican Party support. In recent years these predictions have turned out to be just the opposite for both states.

== Government ==
The Governor of the Territory of Alaska was appointed by the President of the United States and not an elected position. Alaska's governor was appointed for a term lasting four years having the power to veto any bill but could be overridden by a 2/3rd vote in the legislature. The Alaska Territory did not have a territorial judiciary system and all matters were taken care of by federal courts.

=== Territorial capitol ===
Alaska's territorial capitol had been in Sitka until 1906, when it was moved north to Juneau. Construction of the Alaska Governor's Mansion began that same year.

=== Justice and law enforcement ===
Prior to the formation of a dedicated territorial law enforcement agency, law enforcement in Alaska was handled by a various federal agencies for decades including the U.S. Army, Navy, and the Revenue Cutter Service. With the establishment of a civilian government in 1884, the United States Marshals Service also deployed deputy U.S. marshals across the territory. Federal marshals, police departments chartered by cities, and other federal law enforcement officers would serve as the primary means of territorial law enforcement until 1941, when the territorial legislature created the Alaska Highway Patrol. Highway patrolmen only patrolled the main highways of Alaska, and did not visit remote areas or regions. They were commissioned to only enforce traffic laws. They were eventually deputized as special deputy U.S. marshals to fill this void in jurisdiction. The legislature refused to make them police officers until the agency name was changed to Alaska Territorial Police and additional personnel were hired from among the U.S. marshals' ranks. The agency became the Alaska Territorial Police in 1953, and again changed its title to Alaska State Troopers in 1967.

Prior to statehood, the Federal Bureau of Prisons had correctional jurisdiction over Alaska.

=== Governors of Territory of Alaska ===
- Walter E. Clark (1912–1913)
- J.F.A. Strong (1913–1918)
- Thomas Riggs Jr. (1918–1921)
- Scott C. Bone (1921–1925)
- George A. Parks (1925–1933)
- John W. Troy (1933–1939)
- Ernest Gruening (1939–1953)
- B. Frank Heintzleman (1953–1957)
- Waino Hendrickson (acting) (1957)
- Mike Stepovich (1957–1958)
- Waino Hendrickson (acting) (1958–1959)

=== Shadow senators ===
Under the Tennessee Plan, Alaska had unrecognized senators and an at-large representative, also being the only shadow congressmen elected by their state, after the passage of the 17th Amendment.

Territory	Office	Name	Elected	Seated
Alaska	Senator	Ernest Gruening	October 6, 1956	January 7, 1959
Alaska	Senator	William A. Egan	October 6, 1956	Elected governor in 1958
Alaska	Representative	Ralph J. Rivers	October 6, 1956	January 7, 1959

== See also ==
- Alaska Territory's at-large congressional district
- Historic regions of the United States
- History of Alaska
- Territorial evolution of the United States
