= John Franklin Alexander Strong =

American politician (1856–1929)

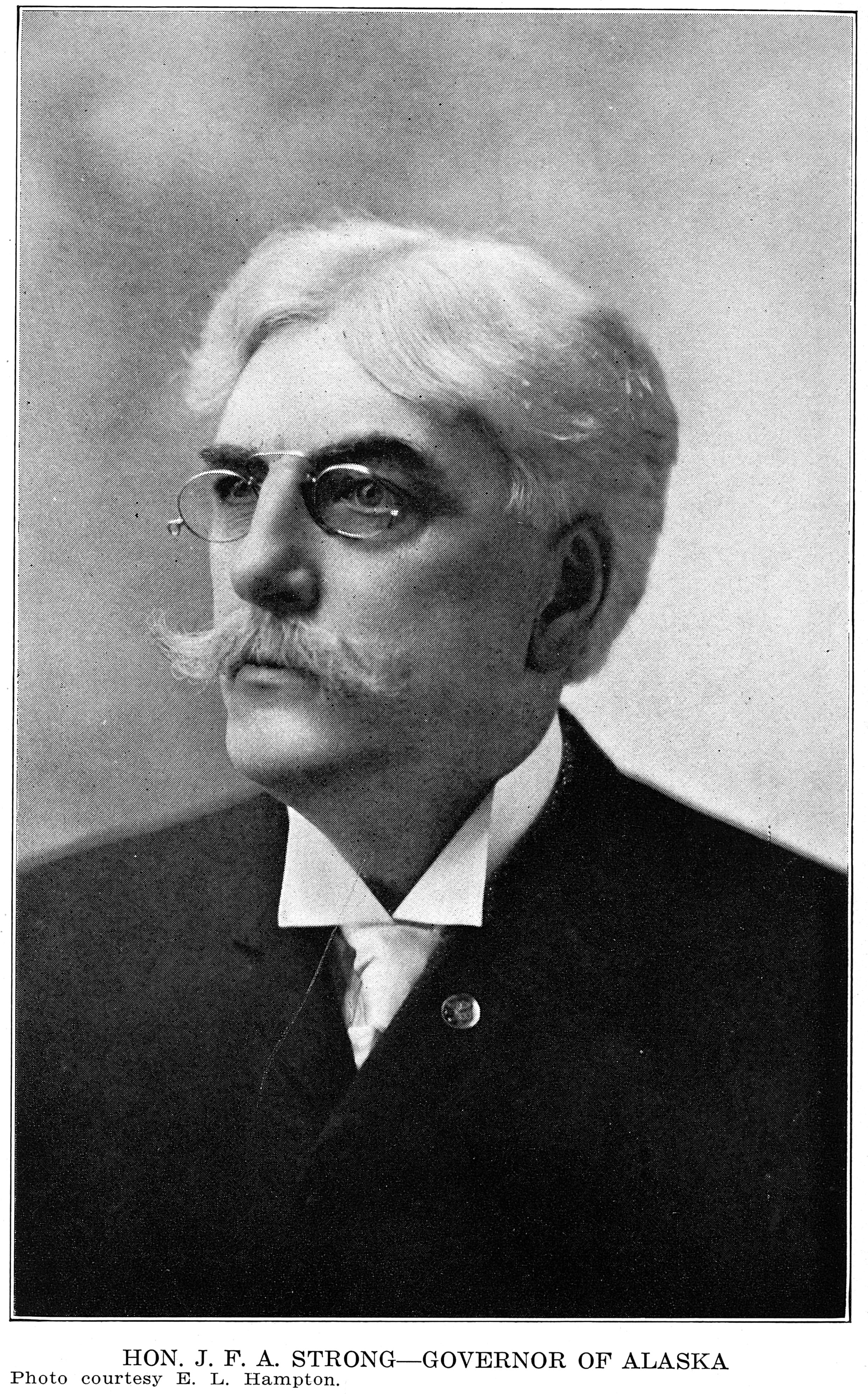

2nd governor of Alaska Territory
- In office May 21, 1913 – April 18, 1918
- Nominated by: Woodrow Wilson
- Preceded by: Walter Eli Clark
- Succeeded by: Thomas Riggs Jr.

Personal details
- Born: October 15, 1856 Salmon Creek, Queens County, New Brunswick, British North America
- Died: July 27, 1929 (aged 72) Seattle, Washington, U.S.
- Party: Democratic
- Spouse(s): Elizabeth A. Aitkens (1879–?); Anna Hall (1896–)

John Franklin Alexander Strong (October 15, 1856 – July 27, 1929) was a British North American-born journalist who was the second governor of Alaska Territory from 1913 to 1918.

== Background ==
John Franklin Alexander Strong was born in Salmon Creek, a small farming community in Queens County, New Brunswick, British North America on October 15, 1856, the son of Adam Robert and Janet (Nicholl) Strong. He graduated from the New Brunswick Normal School in 1874. After graduation he spent the next fourteen years working as a store owner and teacher throughout the province. On December 31, 1879, he married Elizabeth A. Aitkens of Fredericton, New Brunswick. The marriage produced three children: Jane, Elizabeth, and Robert. He committed bigamy in 1896 when he wed Anna Hall of Tacoma, Washington.

Strong joined the Klondike Gold Rush in 1897. During his travels he worked at newspapers in Dawson City, Skagway, Alaska, and Nome, Alaska. In 1905 he established The Nome Nugget. Strong left Alaska in 1906 to work as an Editor for papers in Tonopah, Nevada, and Greenwater, California. He returned to Alaska the next year, publishing the Herald in Katalla. In 1910 he founded the Nugget in Iditarod before becoming publisher of Juneau's Alaska Daily Empire in 1912.

== Governorship ==
President Woodrow Wilson nominated Strong to become governor of Alaska Territory on April 17, 1913. The nomination was in keeping with a 1912 Democratic plank calling for territorial governors to be area residents. The new governor was sworn into office on May 21, 1913.

Soon after becoming governor, Strong was faced with a financial crisis. The territory's salmon canneries, claiming the recently enacted tax on canned salmon was illegal, refused to pay. The tax was a major source of income for the territory and the lack of funds thus created severely limited Strong's ability to implement development projects. This issue continued until after the governor left office.

Significant legislation signed into law by Governor Strong included the granting of United States citizenship to members of the indigenous population that gave up tribal life, implementation of workers' compensation and the United States' first old age pension, authorization of a territorial university, and creation of a Board of Education. Additionally, in 1917, the voters in the territory approved a prohibition referendum. Other changes affecting the territory was the authorization for construction of the Alaska Railroad in October 1914, loosening of federal controls on road building and coal mining, and creation of Mount McKinley National Park in 1917.

President Wilson declined to reappoint Strong to a second term as governor and his final day in office came in April 1918. According to U.S. Senator and Alaskan history expert Ernest Gruening, the President declined to reappoint Strong because he had been given information indicating that the Canadian-born Strong had never been naturalized as a United States citizen.

== Later life ==
After leaving office, Strong established his home in Seattle, Washington while wintering in Los Angeles. In 1922 he began a world tour. After spending a year in India, he returned to the United States in 1924. Strong died on July 27, 1929, in Seattle from a heart attack.

Political offices
Preceded by Walter Eli Clark	Territorial Governor of Alaska; 1913–1918	Succeeded by Thomas Riggs Jr.
