= Juneau Empire =

Daily newspaper in Juneau, Alaska

Coordinates: 58°19′39″N 134°28′4″W

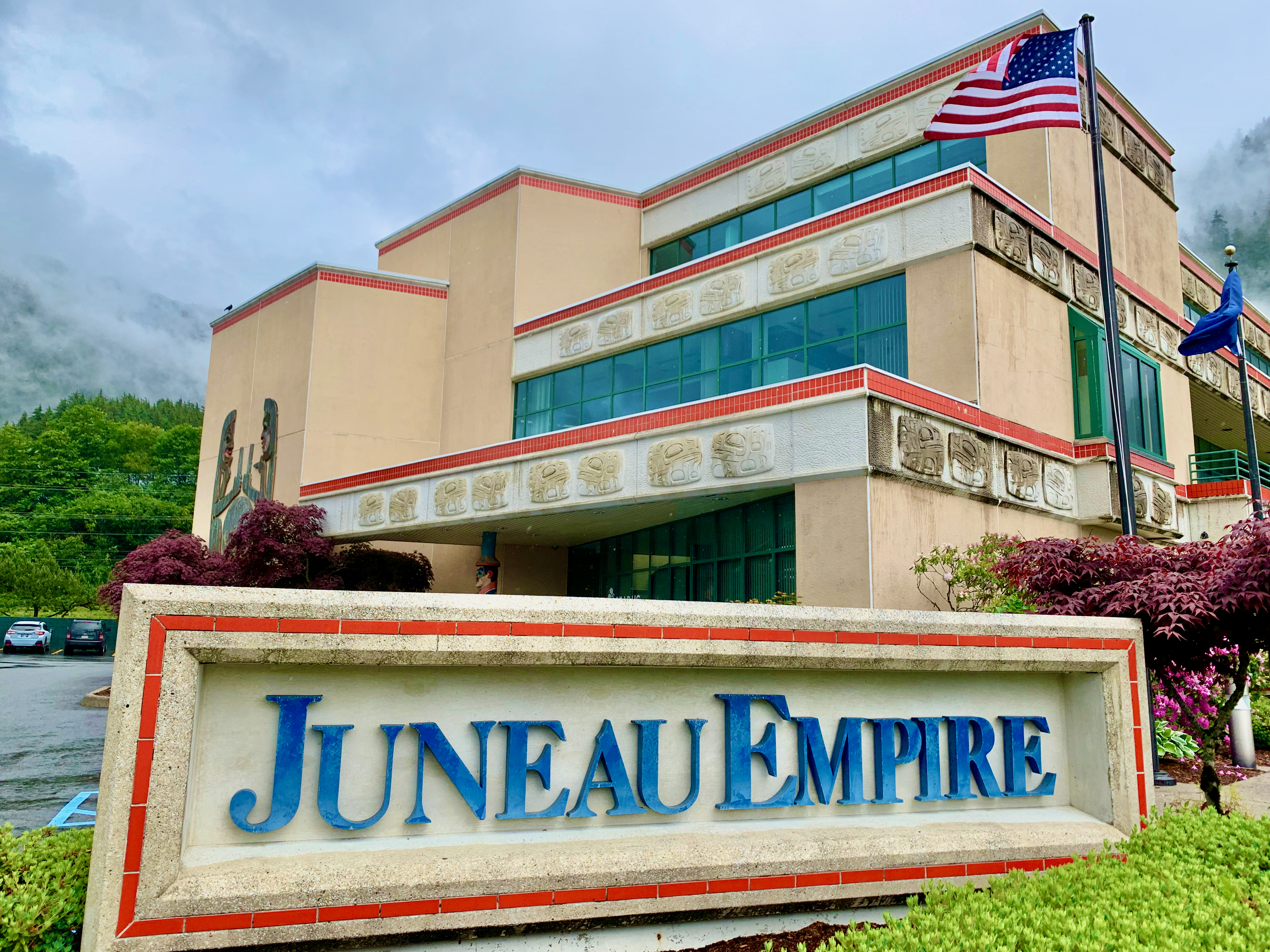
- The Juneau Empire newspaper headquarters in Alaska on June 18, 2019
- Type: Biweekly newspaper
- Format: Broadsheet
- Owner: Sound Publishing
- Founder: John Franklin Alexander Strong
- Founded: November 2, 1912
- Language: English
- Headquarters: 8800 Glacier Highway Suite 219; Juneau, Alaska 99801; United States
- Circulation: 1,595 Wednesday; 1,802 Saturday (as of 2023)
- Sister newspapers: Homer News; Peninsula Clarion
- OCLC number: 9611310
- Website: juneauempire.com

The Juneau Empire is a newspaper in Juneau, Alaska, United States. It publishes issues on Wednesdays and Saturdays.

== History ==
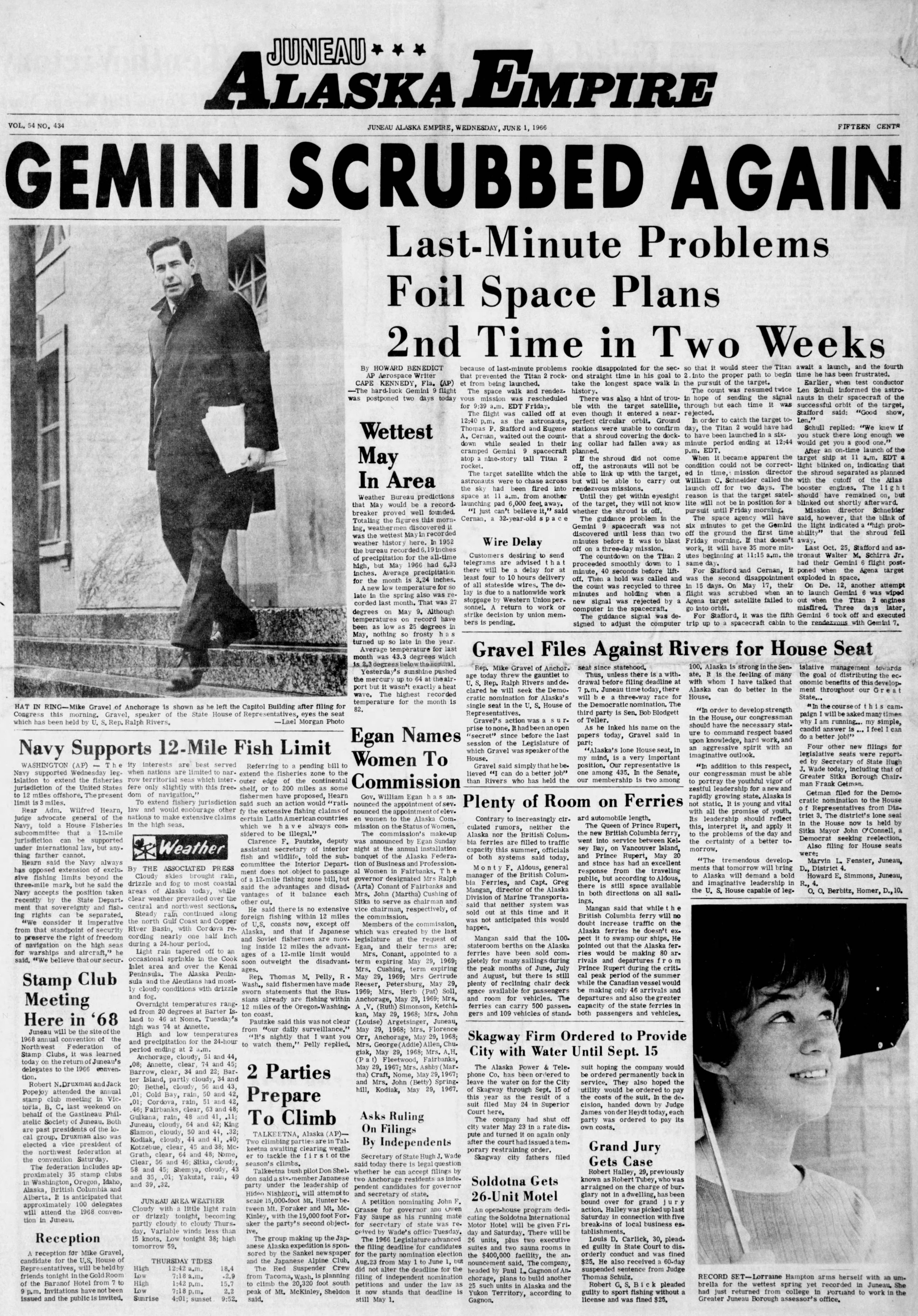
Mike Gravel on the cover of the Empire, June 1, 1966

The newspaper was first published on November 2, 1912, as the Alaska Daily Empire. It was founded by John Franklin Alexander Strong, who soon afterward become the second territorial governor of Alaska. After Strong was appointed to office, the paper was edited by John Weir Troy, who bought it in January 1914. He edited the Empire until he was also elected governor 1933. Under Troy, the paper investigated the paper's founder and discovered Strong had lied about his background, including his education and military service.

After Troy died in 1942, the paper was published by his daughter Mrs. Helen Troy Monsen. Governor Ernest Gruening, State Treasurer Henry Roden and Highway Engineer Frank Metcalf sued the Empire for libel, seeking a total of $400,00 in damages, over a 1952 article accusing them of improperly allocating state funds for the Chilkoot ferry in violation of state law. Monsen published an editorial fighting back against the clams and stated the lawsuit was in response to the Empire's coverage of the administration.

In 1955, Monsen sold the paper to William Prescott Allen, publisher of The Montrose Press and the Laredo Morning Times. Allen published columns on the libel lawsuit defending Monsen and allegedly made wagers over the case's outcome. Allen later spend a night in jail in Texas for contempt of court for refusing to reveal sources in another story. A jury ruled against the paper in the libel suit and fined them $15,003. The paper later lost its appeal.

In 1960, Donrey Media Group bought the Empire, and then sold it in 1969 to South Eastern Newspaper Corporation. The company was later renamed to Morris Communications. In September 2015, the paper laid off five employees — three people in the business office and two graphic designers. Several newspaper offices were also consolidated into one location in Anchorage. In 2017, Morris sold its newspapers to GateHouse Media. In 2018, GateHouse sold its Alaska papers to Sound Publications, a subsidiary of Black Press Media. A staff photographer and a sports reporter were laid off in January 2020.

On May 3, 2023, the Juneau Empire reduced its print frequency from five days a week to two. The paper has also shifted print production to a facility in Lakewood, Washington and decreased subscription prices 15-25%. The press, a Goss Community Offset originally installed in 1986, was dismantled and shipped to Seattle for storage. In March 2024, Black Press was acquired by Carpenter Media Group.

In June 2025, the paper's editor Mark Sabbatini resigned and the company said he would not be replaced. Instead, the Empire was to be edited and managed remotely from Kenai. Sabbatini then launched a rival news site called the Juneau Independent. Soon nearly all newsroom staff at the Empire left to work at the Independent.

In September 2025, four staff members who worked for the Empire and its two sibling papers resigned after Carpenter Media changed an online article written about a vigil held for Charlie Kirk after Rep. Sarah Vance wrote a letter to the company complaining about how the Conservative activist was covered. In May 2026, the paper moved into a single-desk office space.
