= Peninsula Clarion =

Local newspaper in Kenai, Alaska, US

- Type: Biweekly newspaper
- Owner: Sound Publishing
- Founder: Clint Young
- Launched: 1970
- Language: English
- Headquarters: Kenai, Alaska
- Circulation: 1,079 Wednesday; 1,156 Saturday (as of 2023)
- Sister newspapers: Homer News; Juneau Empire
- OCLC number: 38079057
- Website: peninsulaclarion.com

The Peninsula Clarion is a regional newspaper published in Kenai, Alaska, that serves the population of the Kenai Peninsula.

== History ==
The first issue of the Peninsula Clarion was published on August 27, 1970. Five years later Clint Young, who founded the paper, sold it to Dick Morgan, Max Swearingen and Pat O'Connell. In 1978, the paper transitioned from a weekly to a Monday through Friday publication. In April 2000, The Clarion began producing its web edition.

In 1990, the paper was purchased by Georgia-based Morris Communications. In 2017, Morris sold its newspapers to GateHouse Media. In 2018, GateHouse sold its Alaska papers to Sound Publications, a subsidiary of Black Press Media.

Beginning May 3, 2023, the Peninsula Clarion is reducing print frequency from five days a week to two. The paper also shifted printing to an off-site Alaska printer. In June 2024, the paper announced it will reduce print frequency to one edition a week mailed out on Fridays.

== See also ==
- List of newspapers in Alaska
