= 1928 United States Senate elections =

Elections Of United States

- November 6, 1928
- Class 1

32 of the 96 seats in the United States Senate 49 seats needed for a majority
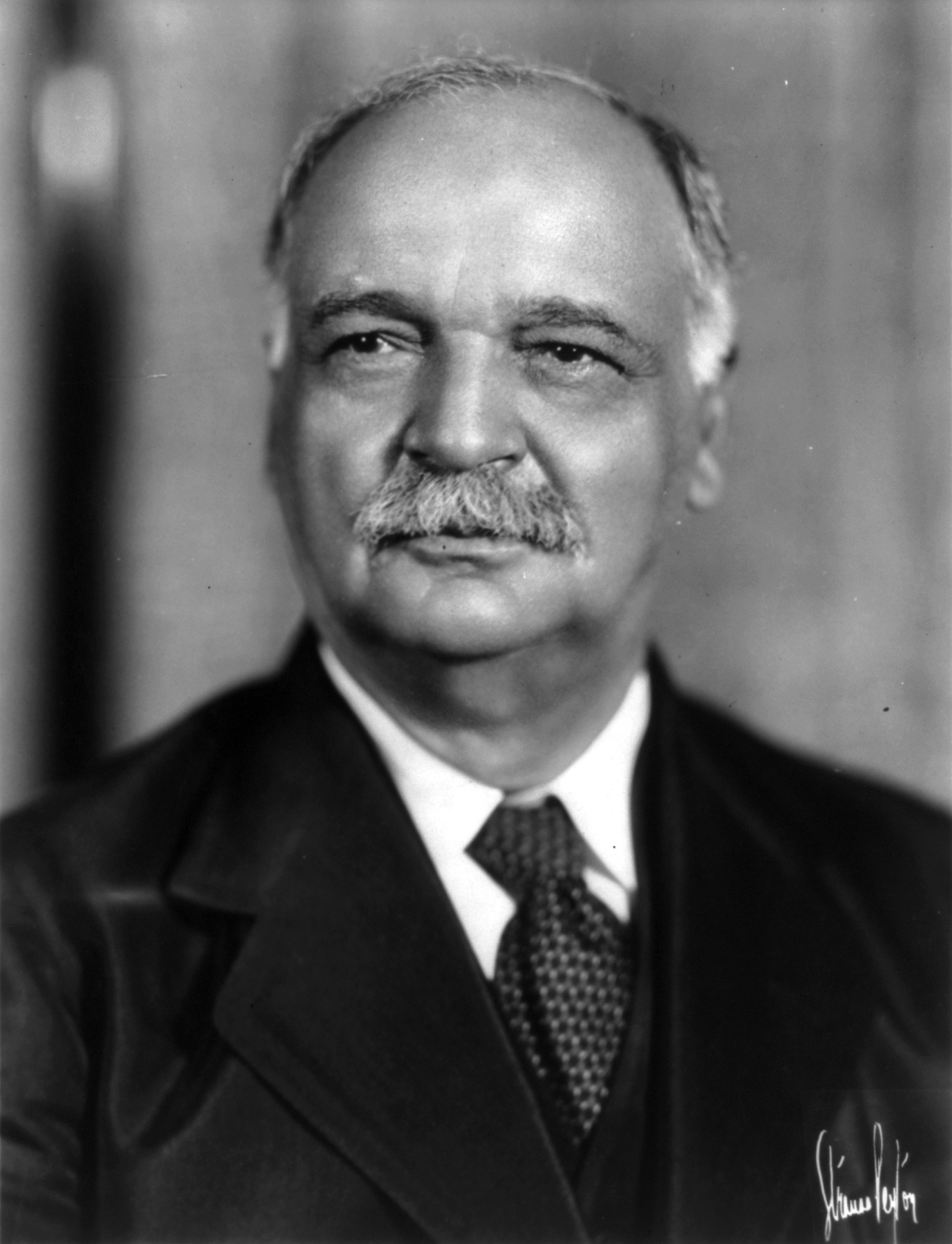

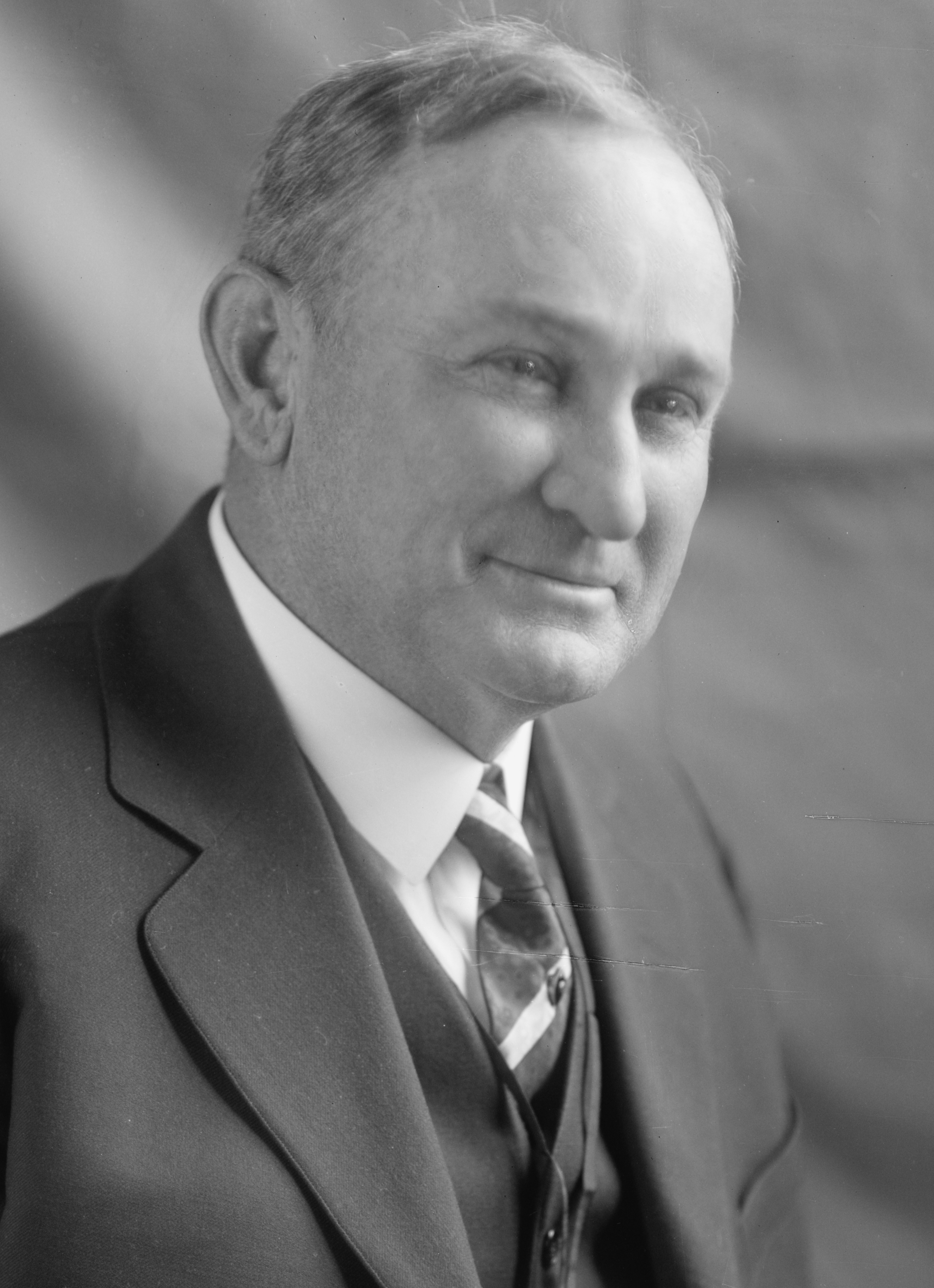
	Majority party	Minority party
Leader	Charles Curtis (retired)	Joseph Robinson
Party	Republican	Democratic
Leader since	November 9, 1924	December 3, 1923
Leader's seat	Kansas	Arkansas
Seats before	49	46
Seats after	56	39
Seat change	▲7	▼7
Seats up	12	19
Races won	18	13
	Third party
Party	Farmer–Labor
Seats before	1
Seats after	1
Seat change	Steady
Seats up	1
Races won	1
- Results of the elections: Democratic hold Republican gain Republican hold Farmer–Labor hold No election
Majority Leader before election
Charles Curtis
Republican
Elected Majority Leader
James Watson
Republican

The 1928 United States Senate elections were elections that coincided with the presidential election of Republican Herbert Hoover. The 32 seats of Class 1 were contested in regular elections, and special elections were held to fill vacancies. The strong economy helped the Republicans to gain seven seats from the Democrats. As of 2026, this is the last time Republicans would hold 56 or more seats in the United States Senate.

Senate Majority leader, Republican Charles Curtis of Kansas, was not up for election this cycle, but he was elected U.S. Vice President. He resigned March 3, 1929, so his seat was vacant at the beginning of the next Congress until April 1, 1929, when a Republican was appointed to continue the term.

== Gains, losses, and holds ==
=== Retirements ===
Two Republicans and one Democrat retired instead of seeking re-election.

State	Senator	Replaced by
Connecticut	George P. McLean	Frederic C. Walcott
Missouri	James A. Reed	Roscoe C. Patterson
New Mexico (special)	Bronson M. Cutting	Octaviano Larrazolo

=== Defeats ===
Seven Democrats sought re-election but lost in the primary or general election.

State	Senator	Replaced by
Delaware	Thomas F. Bayard Jr.	John G. Townsend Jr.
Maryland	William Cabell Bruce	Phillips Lee Goldsborough
New Jersey	Edward I. Edwards	Hamilton F. Kean
Ohio (special)	Cyrus Locher	Theodore E. Burton
Rhode Island	Peter G. Gerry	Felix Hebert
Texas	Earle B. Mayfield	Tom Connally
West Virginia	Matthew M. Neely	Henry D. Hatfield

=== Disqualification ===
Two Republicans were elected in 1926, but disqualified from taking office. One resigned on February 9, 1928, and the seat was filled in the 1928 election. One resigned December 6, 1929 and the seat was filled by appointment.

State	Senator	Replaced by
Illinois	Frank L. Smith	Otis F. Glenn
Pennsylvania	William Scott Vare	Joseph R. Grundy

=== Post-election changes ===
State	Senator	Replaced by
New Jersey	Walter Evans Edge	David Baird Jr.
Ohio	Theodore E. Burton	Roscoe C. McCulloch
Kentucky	Frederic M. Sackett	John M. Robsion
Tennessee	Lawrence Tyson	William Emerson Brock
Wyoming	Francis E. Warren	Patrick Joseph Sullivan

== Change in composition ==
=== Before the elections ===
At the beginning of 1928.

		D_{1}	D_{2}	D_{3}	D_{4}	D_{5}	D_{6}	D_{7}	D_{8}
D_{18}	D_{17}	D_{16}	D_{15}	D_{14}	D_{13}	D_{12}	D_{11}	D_{10}	D_{9}
D_{19}	D_{20}	D_{21}	D_{22}	D_{23}	D_{24}	D_{25}	D_{26}	D_{27} Del. Ran	D_{28} Ariz. Ran
D_{38} R.I. Ran	D_{37} Ohio (sp); Ran	D_{36} N.Y. Ran	D_{35} N.J. Ran	D_{34} Mont. Ran	D_{33} Mo. Retired	D_{32} Miss. Ran	D_{31} Mass. Ran	D_{30} Md. Ran	D_{29} Fla. Ran
D_{39} Tenn. Ran	D_{40} Texas; Ran	D_{41} Utah; Ran	D_{42} Va. Ran	D_{43} Wash. Ran	D_{44} W.Va. Ran	D_{45} Wyo. Ran	FL_{1} Minn. Ran	V_{1} Sen. Vare	V_{2} Ill. (sp)
Plurality ↓
R_{39} Maine; Ran	R_{40} Mich. (reg); Mich. (sp); Ran	R_{41} Neb. Ran	R_{42} Nev. Ran	R_{43} N.M. (reg); Ran N.M. (sp); Retired	R_{44} N.D. Ran	R_{45} Ohio (reg); Ran	R_{46} Pa. Ran	R_{47} Vt. Ran	R_{48} Wis. Ran
R_{38} Ind. Ran	R_{37} Idaho (sp); Ran	R_{36} Conn. Retired	R_{35} Calif. Ran	R_{34}	R_{33}	R_{32}	R_{31}	R_{30}	R_{29}
R_{19}	R_{20}	R_{21}	R_{22}	R_{23}	R_{24}	R_{25}	R_{26}	R_{27}	R_{28}
R_{18}	R_{17}	R_{16}	R_{15}	R_{14}	R_{13}	R_{12}	R_{11}	R_{10}	R_{9}
		R_{1}	R_{2}	R_{3}	R_{4}	R_{5}	R_{6}	R_{7}	R_{8}

=== Elections result ===
		D_{1}	D_{2}	D_{3}	D_{4}	D_{5}	D_{6}	D_{7}	D_{8}
D_{18}	D_{17}	D_{16}	D_{15}	D_{14}	D_{13}	D_{12}	D_{11}	D_{10}	D_{9}
D_{19}	D_{20}	D_{21}	D_{22}	D_{23}	D_{24}	D_{25}	D_{26}	D_{27} Ariz. Re-elected	D_{28} Fla. Re-elected
D_{38} Wyo. Re-elected	D_{37} Wash. Re-elected	D_{36} Va. Re-elected	D_{35} Utah; Re-elected	D_{34} Texas; Hold	D_{33} Tenn. Re-elected	D_{32} N.Y. Re-elected	D_{31} Mont. Re-elected	D_{30} Miss. Re-elected	D_{29} Mass. Re-elected
FL_{1} Minn. Re-elected	V_{1} Sen. Vare	V_{2} VP Curtis	R_{55} Wis. Re-elected	R_{54} W.Va. Gain	R_{53} Vt. Re-elected	R_{52} R.I. Gain	R_{51} Pa. Re-elected	R_{50} Ohio (sp); Gain	R_{49} Ohio (reg); Re-elected
Majority →									R_{49} Ohio (reg); Re-elected
R_{39} Ind. Re-elected	R_{40} Maine; Re-elected	R_{41} Md. Gain	R_{42} Mich. (reg); Mich. (sp); Elected (Note: Appointee elected)	R_{43} Mo. Gain	R_{44} Neb. Re-elected	R_{45} Nev. Re-elected	R_{46} N.J. Gain	R_{47} N.M. (reg); Elected N.M. (sp); Hold	R_{48} N.D. Re-elected
R_{38} Ill. (sp); Gain	R_{37} Idaho (sp); Elected	R_{36} Del. Gain	R_{35} Conn. Hold	R_{34} Calif. Re-elected	R_{33}	R_{32}	R_{31}	R_{30}	R_{29}
R_{19}	R_{20}	R_{21}	R_{22}	R_{23}	R_{24}	R_{25}	R_{26}	R_{27}	R_{28}
R_{18}	R_{17}	R_{16}	R_{15}	R_{14}	R_{13}	R_{12}	R_{11}	R_{10}	R_{9}
		R_{1}	R_{2}	R_{3}	R_{4}	R_{5}	R_{6}	R_{7}	R_{8}

Key

D_{#}	Democratic
FL_{#}	Farmer–Labor
R_{#}	Republican
V_{#}	Vacant

== Race summary ==
=== Special elections during the 70th Congress ===
In these special elections, the winner were seated during 1928; ordered by election date.

State	Incumbent			Results	Candidates
State	Senator	Party	Electoral history	Results	Candidates
Idaho (Class 3)	John Thomas	Republican	1928 (Appointed)	Frank R. Gooding (R) died June 24, 1928, and Thomas was appointed June 30, 1928, to continue the term. Interim appointee elected November 6, 1928.	▌ ✓ John Thomas (Republican) 62.6%; ▌Chase A. Clark (Democratic) 36.7%
Illinois (Class 3)	Vacant			1926 Senator-elect Frank L. Smith (R) had been disqualified and resigned February 9, 1928. New senator elected November 6, 1928. Republican hold.	▌ ✓ Otis F. Glenn (Republican) 54.5%; ▌Anton Cermak (Democratic) 44.9%
Michigan (Class 1)	Arthur Vandenberg	Republican	1928 (Appointed)	Woodbridge N. Ferris (D) died March 23, 1928, and Vandenberg was appointed to continue the term. Interim appointee elected November 6, 1928. Winner was also elected to the next term, see below.	▌ ✓ Arthur Vandenberg (Republican) 72.03%; ▌John W. Bailey (Democratic) 27.78%
New Mexico (Class 1)	Bronson M. Cutting	Republican	1927 (Appointed)	Interim appointee did not run to finish the term, but was elected to the next term, see below. New senator elected November 6, 1928. Republican hold.	▌ ✓ Octaviano Larrazolo (Republican) 55.65%; ▌Juan N. Vigil (Democratic) 44.35%
Ohio (Class 3)	Cyrus Locher	Democratic	1928 (Appointed)	Frank B. Willis (R) died March 30, 1928, and Locher was appointed to continue the term. Interim appointee lost nomination. New senator elected November 6, 1928. Republican gain.	▌ ✓ Theodore E. Burton (Republican) 62.4%; ▌Graham P. Hunt (Democratic) 37.4%

=== Elections leading to the 71st Congress ===
In these general elections, the winners were elected for the term beginning March 4, 1929; ordered by state.

All of the elections involved the Class 1 seats, unless otherwise indicated.

State	Incumbent			Results	Candidates
State	Senator	Party	Electoral history	Results	Candidates
Arizona	Henry F. Ashurst	Democratic	1912; 1916; 1922	Incumbent re-elected.	▌ ✓ Henry F. Ashurst (Democratic) 54.3%; ▌Ralph H. Cameron (Republican) 45.7%
California	Hiram Johnson	Republican	1916; 1922	Incumbent re-elected.	▌ ✓ Hiram Johnson (Republican) 74.1%; ▌Minor Moore (Democratic) 18.2%; ▌Charles Hiram Randall (Independent) 5.9%
Connecticut	George P. McLean	Republican	1911; 1922	Incumbent retired. New senator elected. Republican hold.	▌ ✓ Frederic C. Walcott (Republican) 53.9%; ▌Augustine Lonergan (Democratic) 45.6%
Delaware	Thomas F. Bayard Jr.	Democratic	1922 (special); 1922	Incumbent lost re-election. New senator elected. Republican gain.	▌ ✓ John G. Townsend Jr. (Republican) 61.0%; ▌Thomas F. Bayard Jr. (Democratic) 39.1%
Florida	Park Trammell	Democratic	1916; 1922	Incumbent re-elected.	▌ ✓ Park Trammell (Democratic) 68.5%; ▌Barclay H. Warburton (Republican) 31.5%
Indiana	Arthur Raymond Robinson	Republican	1926 (special)	Incumbent re-elected.	▌ ✓ Arthur Raymond Robinson (Republican) 55.3%; ▌Albert Stump (Democratic) 44.1%
Maine	Frederick Hale	Republican	1916; 1922	Incumbent re-elected.	▌ ✓ Frederick Hale (Republican) 69.6%; ▌Herbert E. Holmes (Democratic) 30.4%
Maryland	William Cabell Bruce	Democratic	1922	Incumbent lost re-election. New senator elected. Republican gain.	▌ ✓ Phillips Lee Goldsborough (Republican) 54.1%; ▌William Cabell Bruce (Democratic) 45.2%
Massachusetts	David I. Walsh	Democratic	1926 (special)	Incumbent re-elected.	▌ ✓ David I. Walsh (Democratic) 53.6%; ▌Benjamin Loring Young (Republican) 45.5%
Michigan	Arthur Vandenberg	Republican	1928 (Appointed)	Interim appointee elected. Winner was also elected to finish the current term, see above.	▌ ✓ Arthur Vandenberg (Republican) 71.8%; ▌John W. Bailey (Democratic) 27.7%
Minnesota	Henrik Shipstead	Farmer–Labor	1922	Incumbent re-elected.	▌ ✓ Henrik Shipstead (Farmer–Labor) 65.4%; ▌Arthur E. Nelson (Republican) 33.7%
Mississippi	Hubert D. Stephens	Democratic	1922	Incumbent re-elected.	▌ ✓ Hubert D. Stephens (Democratic); Unopposed
Missouri	James A. Reed	Democratic	1910; 1916; 1922	Incumbent retired. New senator elected. Republican gain.	▌ ✓ Roscoe C. Patterson (Republican) 51.9%; ▌Charles M. Hay (Democratic) 47.9%
Montana	Burton K. Wheeler	Democratic	1922	Incumbent re-elected.	▌ ✓ Burton K. Wheeler (Democratic) 53.2%; ▌Joseph M. Dixon (Republican) 46.8%
Nebraska	Robert B. Howell	Republican	1922	Incumbent re-elected.	▌ ✓ Robert B. Howell (Republican) 61.3%; ▌Richard Lee Metcalfe (Democratic) 38.7%
Nevada	Key Pittman	Democratic	1913 (special); 1916; 1922	Incumbent re-elected.	▌ ✓ Key Pittman (Democratic) 59.3%; ▌Samuel Platt (Republican) 40.7%
New Jersey	Edward I. Edwards	Democratic	1922	Incumbent lost re-election. New senator elected. Republican gain.	▌ ✓ Hamilton F. Kean (Republican) 57.9%; ▌Edward I. Edwards (Democratic) 41.8%
New Mexico	Bronson M. Cutting	Republican	1927 (Appointed)	Interim appointee elected. Winner was not elected to finish the current term, see above.	▌ ✓ Bronson M. Cutting (Republican) 57.7%; ▌Jethro S. Vaught (Democratic) 42.3%
New York	Royal S. Copeland	Democratic	1922	Incumbent re-elected.	▌ ✓ Royal S. Copeland (Democratic) 49.1%; ▌Alanson B. Houghton (Republican) 47.9%
North Dakota	Lynn Frazier	Republican	1922	Incumbent re-elected.	▌ ✓ Lynn Frazier (Republican) 79.6%; ▌F. F. Burchard (Democratic) 19.4%
Ohio	Simeon D. Fess	Republican	1922	Incumbent re-elected.	▌ ✓ Simeon D. Fess (Republican) 60.7%; ▌Charles V. Truax (Democratic) 39.1%
Pennsylvania	David A. Reed	Republican	1922 (Appointed); 1922 (special); 1922	Incumbent re-elected.	▌ ✓ David A. Reed (Republican) 64.4%; ▌William N. McNair (Democratic) 34.0%
Rhode Island	Peter G. Gerry	Democratic	1916; 1922	Incumbent lost re-election. New senator elected. Republican gain.	▌ ✓ Felix Hebert (Republican) 50.6%; ▌Peter G. Gerry (Democratic) 49.3%
Tennessee	Kenneth McKellar	Democratic	1916; 1922	Incumbent re-elected.	▌ ✓ Kenneth McKellar (Democratic) 59.3%; ▌James Alexander Fowler (Republican) 40.7%
Texas	Earle B. Mayfield	Democratic	1922	Incumbent lost renomination. New senator elected. Democratic hold.	▌ ✓ Tom Connally (Democratic) 81.2%; ▌T. M. Kennerly (Republican) 18.7%
Utah	William H. King	Democratic	1916; 1922	Incumbent re-elected.	▌ ✓ William H. King (Democratic) 55.5%; ▌Ernest Bamberger (Republican) 43.9%
Vermont	Frank L. Greene	Republican	1916; 1922	Incumbent re-elected.	▌ ✓ Frank L. Greene (Republican) 71.6%; ▌Fred C. Martin (Democratic) 28.5%
Virginia	Claude A. Swanson	Democratic	1910 (Appointed); 1911 (Appointed); 1912 (special); 1916; 1922	Incumbent re-elected.	▌ ✓ Claude A. Swanson (Democratic) 99.8%; Unopposed
Washington	Clarence Dill	Democratic	1922	Incumbent re-elected.	▌ ✓ Clarence Dill (Democratic) 53.4%; ▌Kenneth Mackintosh (Republican) 46.5%; ▌Alex Noral (Communist) 0.1%
West Virginia	Matthew M. Neely	Democratic	1922	Incumbent lost re-election. New senator elected. Republican gain.	▌ ✓ Henry D. Hatfield (Republican) 50.7%; ▌Matthew M. Neely (Democratic) 49.2%
Wisconsin	Robert M. La Follette Jr.	Republican	1925 (special)	Incumbent re-elected.	▌ ✓ Robert M. La Follette Jr. (Republican) 85.6%; ▌William H. Markham (Independent) 11.0%; ▌David W. Emerson (Prohibition) 2.9%
Wyoming	John B. Kendrick	Democratic	1916; 1922	Incumbent re-elected.	▌ ✓ John B. Kendrick (Democratic) 53.5%; ▌Charles E. Winter (Republican) 46.1%

== Closest races ==
Twelve races had a margin of victory under 10%:

State	Party of winner	Margin
New York	Democratic	1.2%
Rhode Island	Republican (flip)	1.3%
West Virginia	Republican (flip)	1.5%
Missouri	Republican (flip)	4.0%
Montana	Democratic	6.4%
Washington	Democratic	6.9%
Wyoming	Democratic	7.4%
Massachusetts	Democratic	8.1%
Connecticut	Republican	8.3%
Arizona	Democratic	8.6%
Maryland	Republican (flip)	8.9%
Illinois	Republican (flip)	9.6%

New Mexico was the tipping point state with a margin of 15.4%.

== Arizona ==
1928 United States Senate election in Arizona
- November 6, 1928
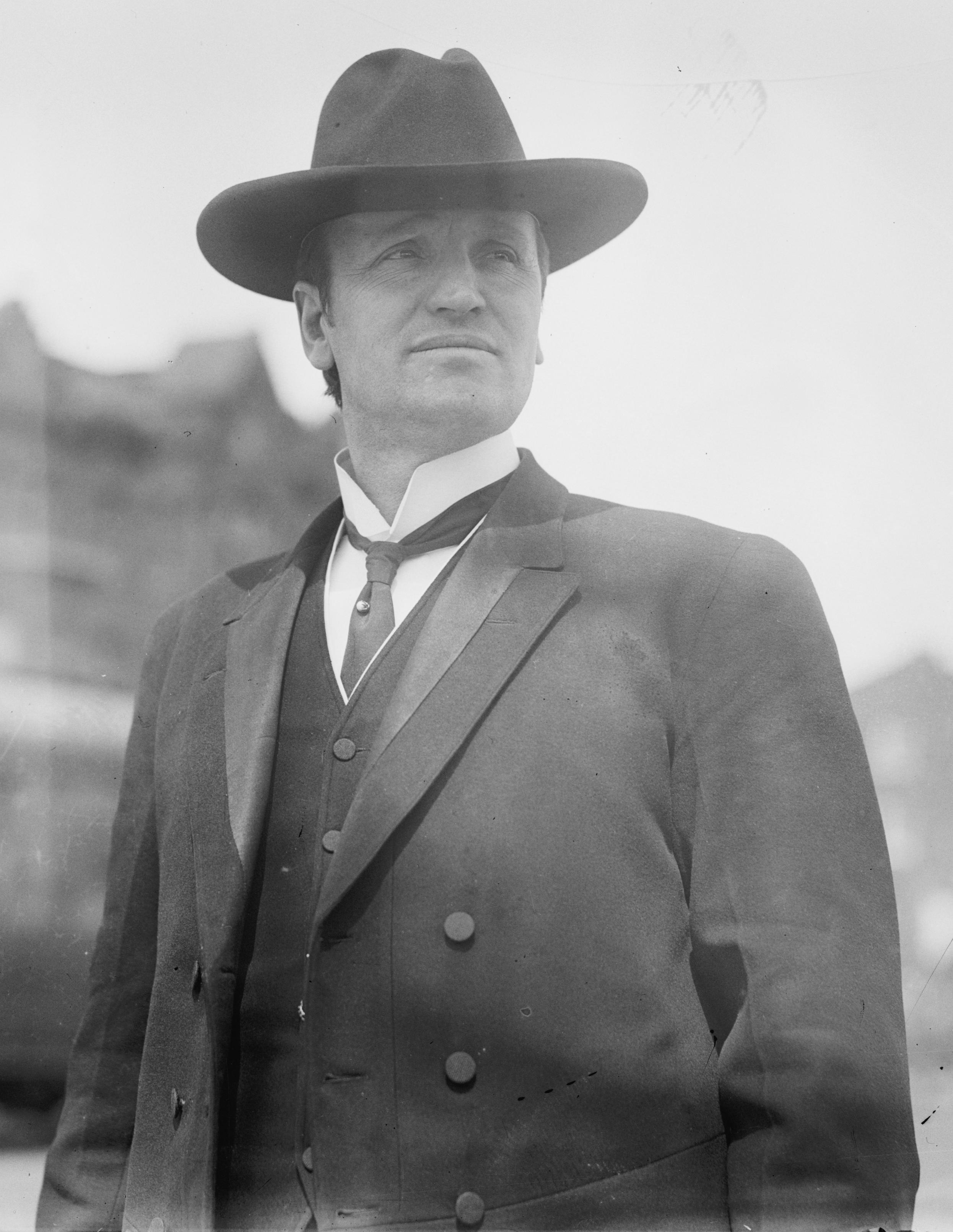

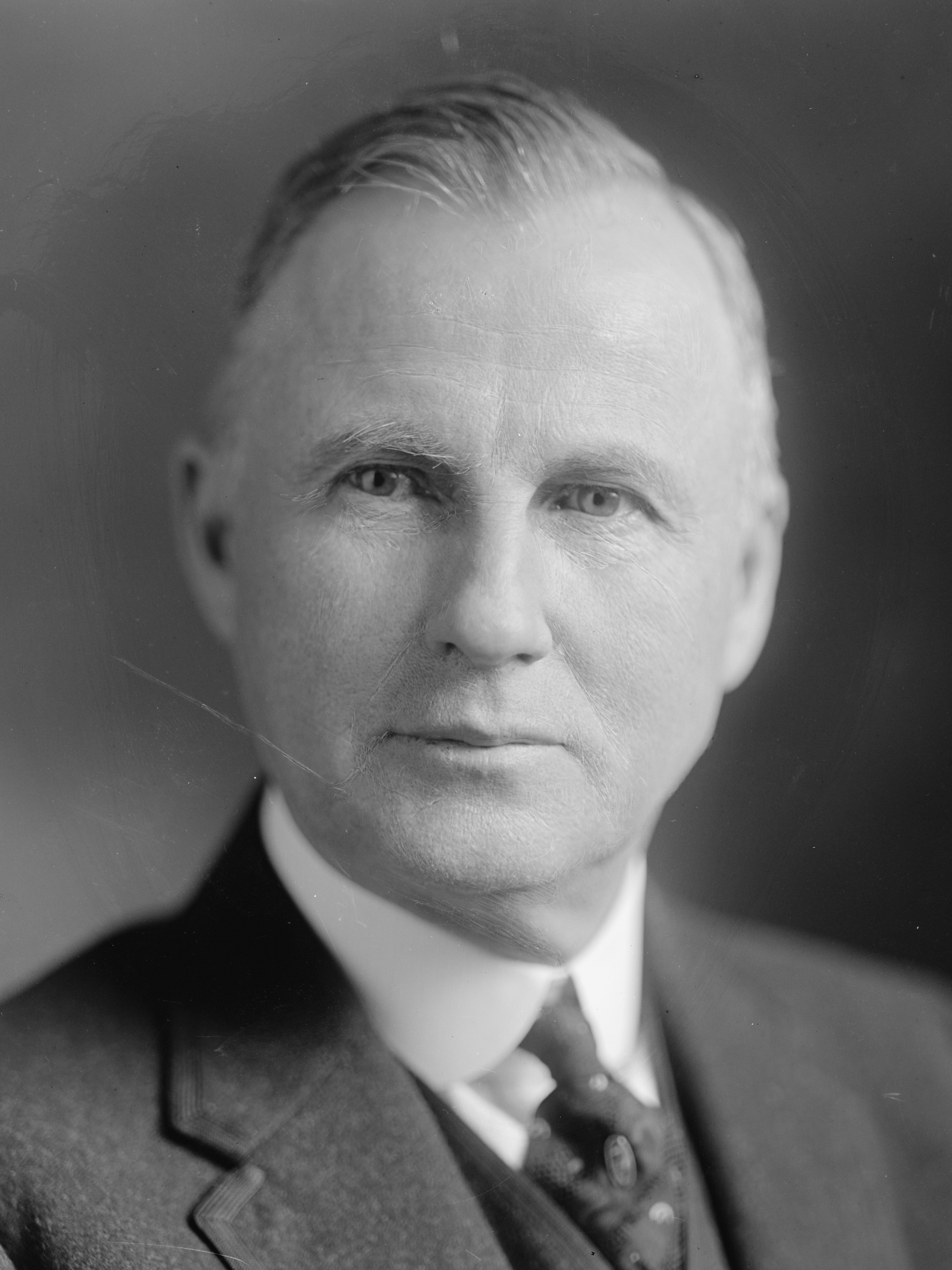
Nominee	Henry F. Ashurst	Ralph H. Cameron
Party	Democratic	Republican
Popular vote	47,013	39,651
Percentage	54.25%	45.75%
- County results Ashurst: 50–60% 60–70% 70–80% Cameron: 50–60%
U.S. senator before election
Henry F. Ashurst
Democratic
Elected U.S. Senator
Henry F. Ashurst
Democratic

1928 United States Senate election in Arizona
Party	Candidate	Votes	%	±%
Democratic	Henry F. Ashurst (incumbent)	47,013	54.25%	
Republican	Ralph H. Cameron	39,651	45.75%	
Majority		7,362	8.50%	
Turnout		86,664		
Democratic hold		Swing		

== California ==
1928 United States Senate election in California
- November 6, 1928
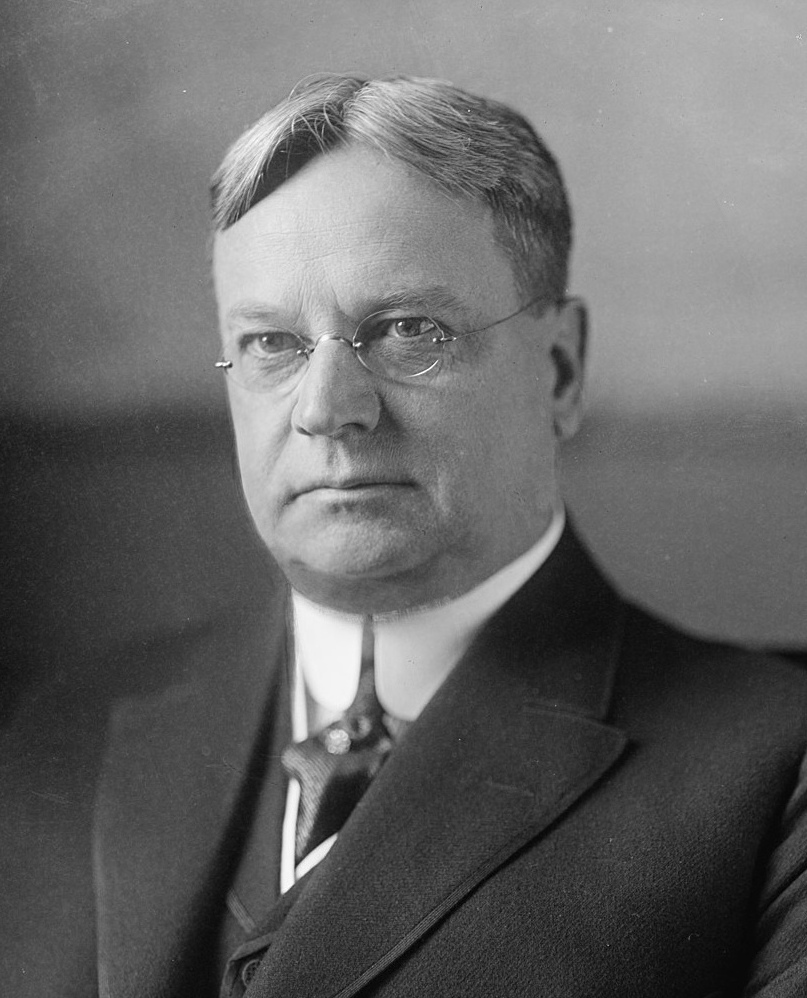

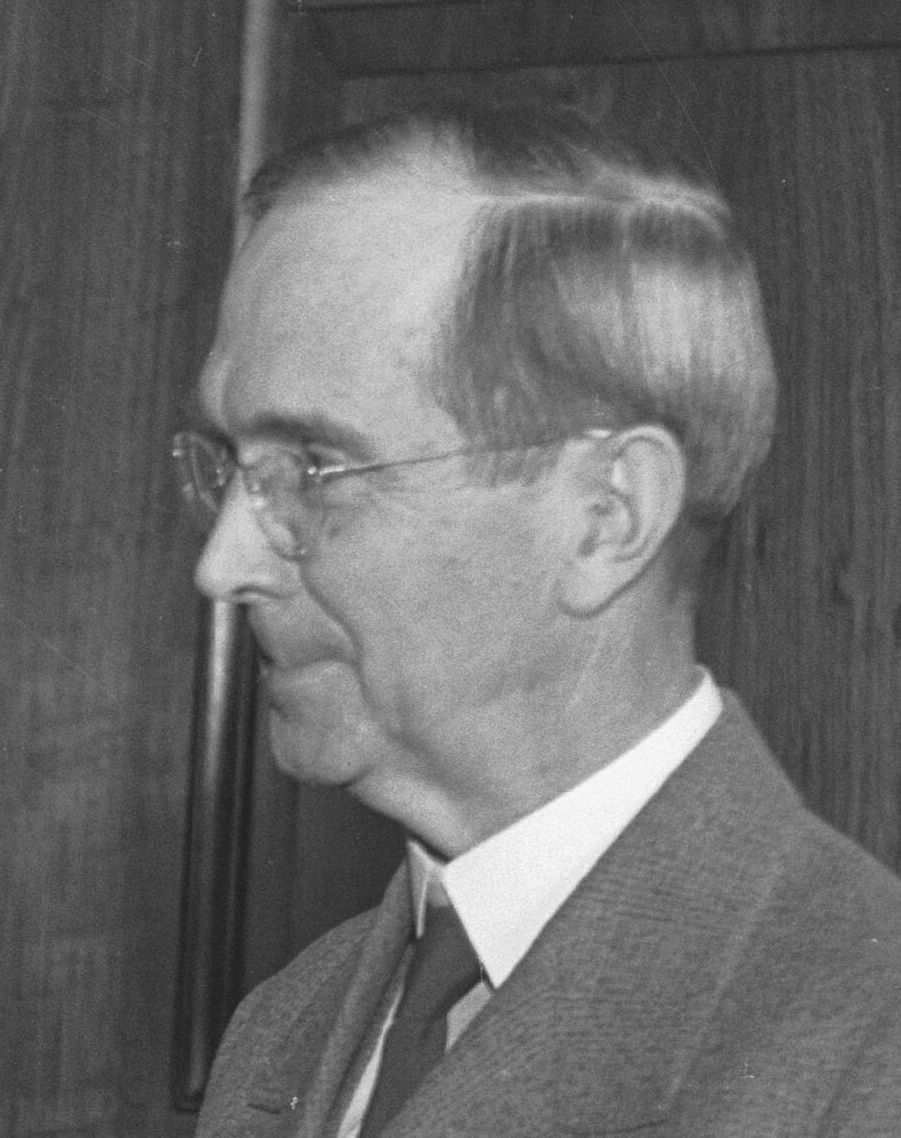

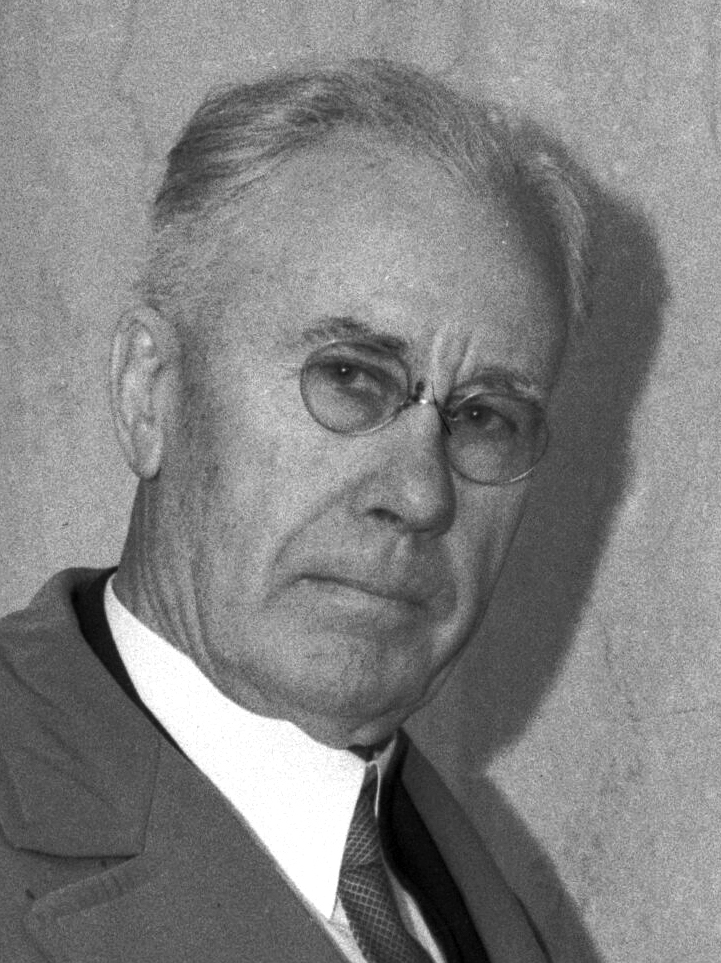
Nominee	Hiram Johnson	Minor Moore	Charles H. Randall
Party	Republican	Democratic	Prohibition
Popular vote	1,148,397	282,411	92,106
Percentage	74.11%	18.23%	5.94%
- County results Johnson: 60–70% 70–80% 80–90% 90–100%
U.S. senator before election
Hiram Johnson
Republican
Elected U.S. Senator
Hiram Johnson
Republican

1928 United States Senate election in California
Party	Candidate	Votes	%
Republican	Hiram Johnson (Incumbent)	1,148,397	74.10%
Democratic	Minor Moore	282,411	18.22%
Prohibition	Charles Hiram Randall	92,106	5.94%
Socialist	Lena Morrow Lewis	26,624	1.72%
Independent	Anita Whitney	154	0.01%
None	Scattering	104	0.01%
Majority		865,986	55.88%
Turnout		1,549,796	
Republican hold			

== Connecticut ==
1928 United States Senate election in Connecticut
- November 6, 1928
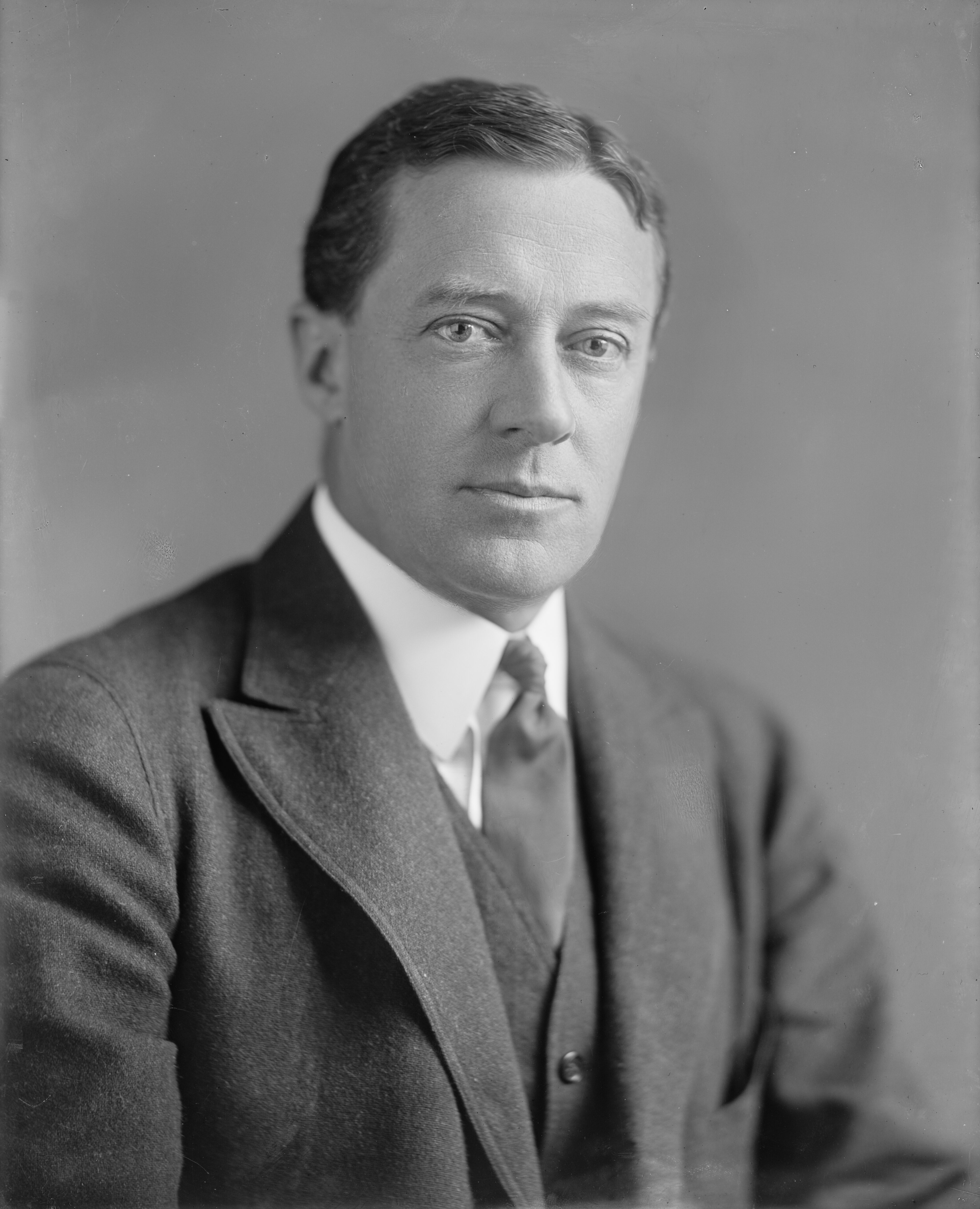

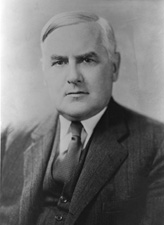
Nominee	Frederic C. Walcott	Augustine Lonergan
Party	Republican	Democratic
Popular vote	296,958	251,429
Percentage	53.86%	45.60%
- Wolcott: 50–60% 60–70% 70–80% 80–90% Lonergan: 50–60% 60–70% 70–80%
U.S. senator before election
George McLean
Republican
Elected U.S. Senator
Frederic C. Walcott
Republican

1928 United States Senate election in Connecticut
Party	Candidate	Votes	%
Republican	Frederic C. Walcott	296,958	53.86%
Democratic	Augustine Lonergan	251,429	45.60%
Socialist	Martin F Plunkett	3,014	0.55%
Majority		45,529	8.26%
Turnout		551,401	
Republican hold			

== Delaware ==
1928 United States Senate election in Delaware
- November 6, 1928
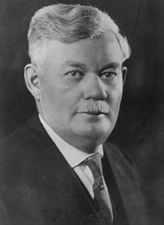

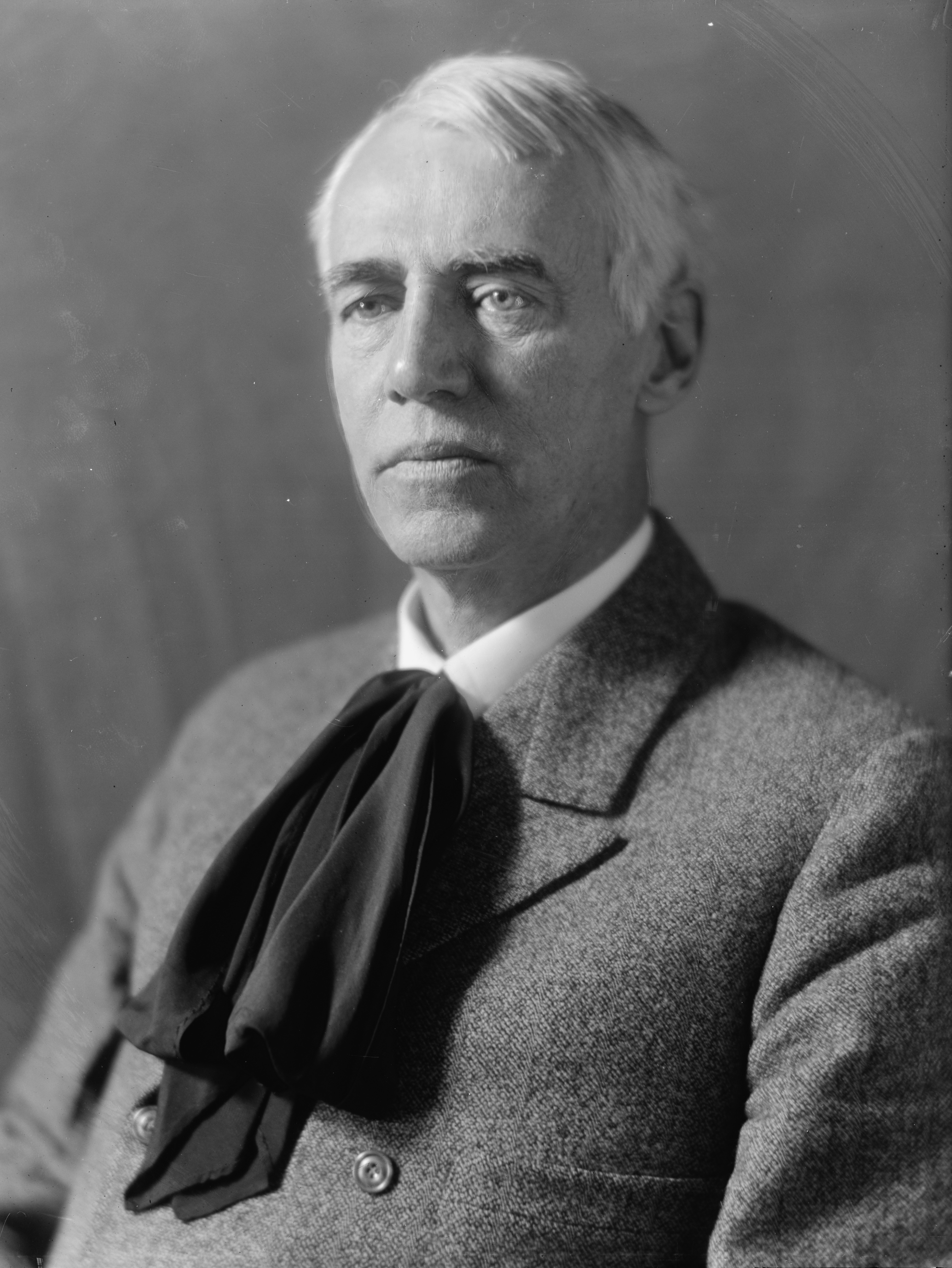
Nominee	John G. Townsend Jr.	Thomas F. Bayard Jr.
Party	Republican	Democratic
Popular vote	63,725	40,828
Percentage	60.95%	39.05%
- County results Townsend: 50–60% 60–70%
U.S. senator before election
Thomas F. Bayard Jr.
Democratic
Elected U.S. Senator
John G. Townsend Jr.
Republican

1928 United States Senate election in Delaware
Party	Candidate	Votes	%
Republican	John G. Townsend Jr.	63,725	60.95%
Democratic	Thomas F. Bayard Jr. (Incumbent)	40,828	39.05%
Majority		22,897	21.90%
Turnout		104,553	
Republican gain from Democratic			

== Florida ==
1928 United States Senate election in Florida
- November 6, 1928
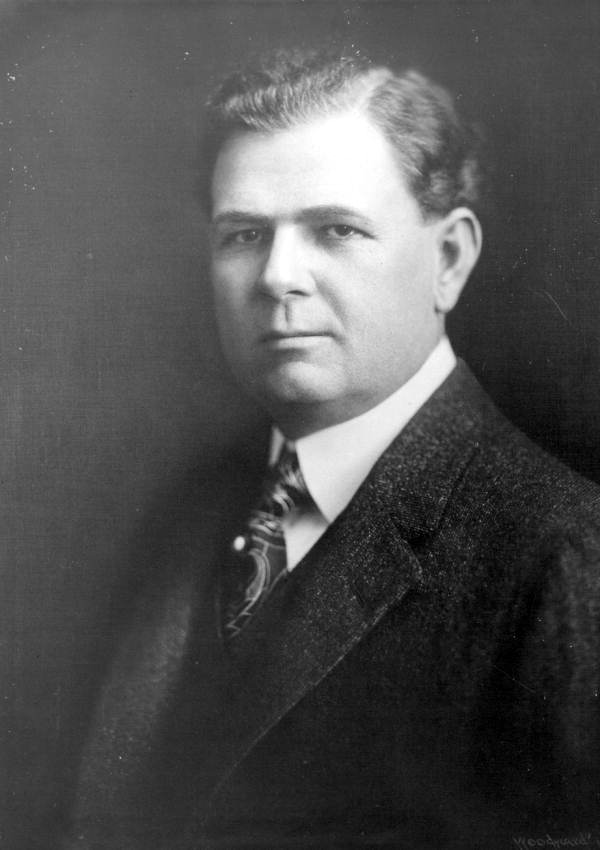

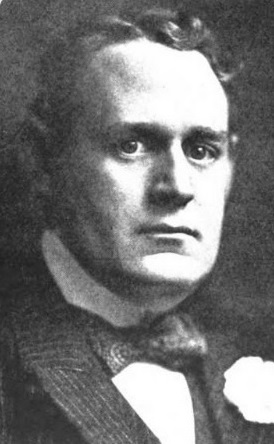
Nominee	Park Trammell	Barclay Warburton
Party	Democratic	Republican
Popular vote	153,816	70,633
Percentage	68.53%	31.47%
- County results Trammell: 50–60% 60–70% 70–80% 80–90% >90% Warburton: 50–60%
U.S. senator before election
Park Trammell
Democratic
Elected U.S. Senator
Park Trammell
Democratic

1928 United States Senate election in Florida
Party	Candidate	Votes	%
Democratic	Park Trammell (Incumbent)	153,816	68.53%
Republican	Barclay H. Warburton	70,633	31.47%
Majority		83,183	37.06%
Turnout		224,449	
Democratic hold			

== Idaho (special) ==
1928 United States Senate special election in Idaho
- November 6, 1928
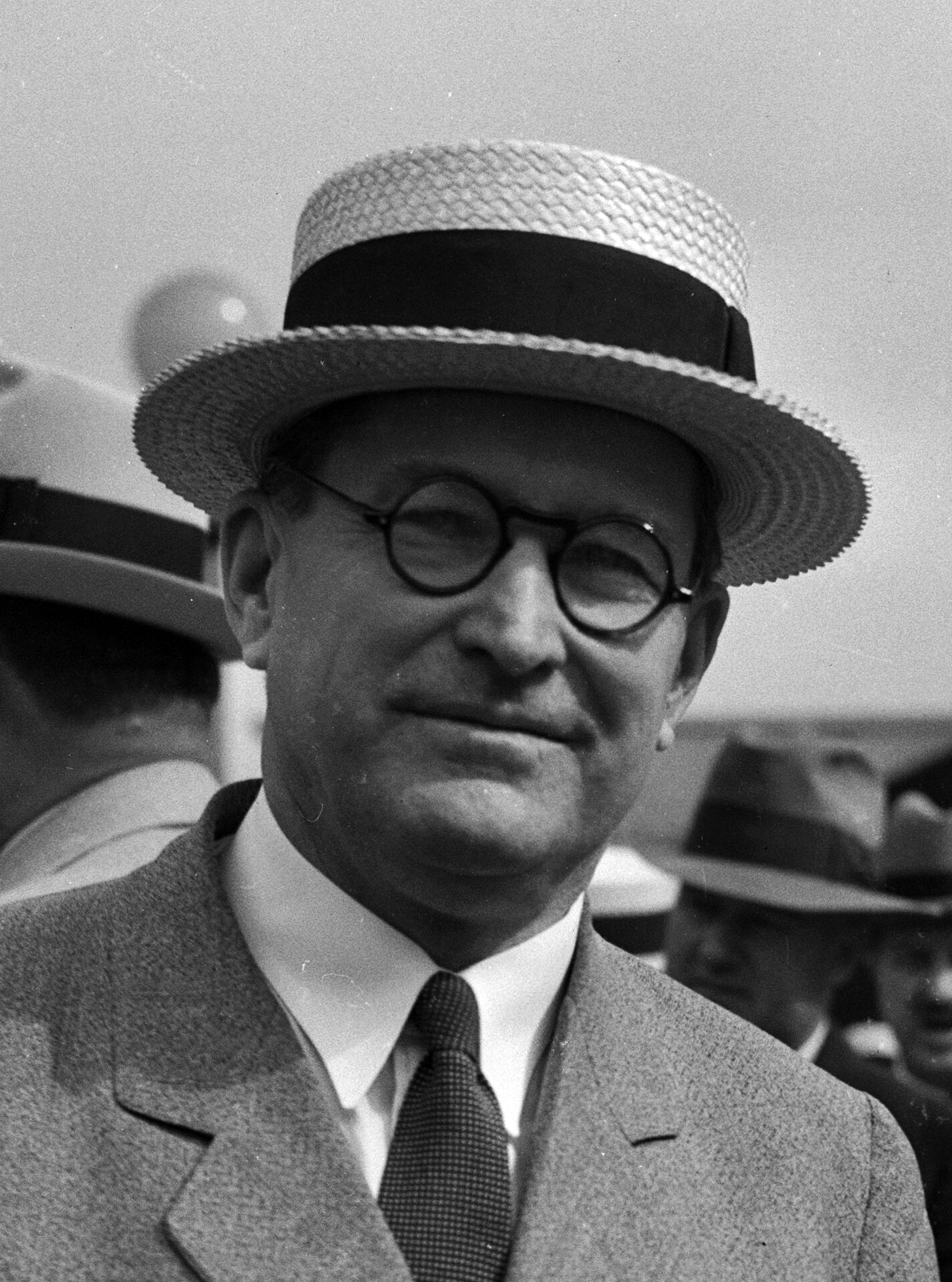

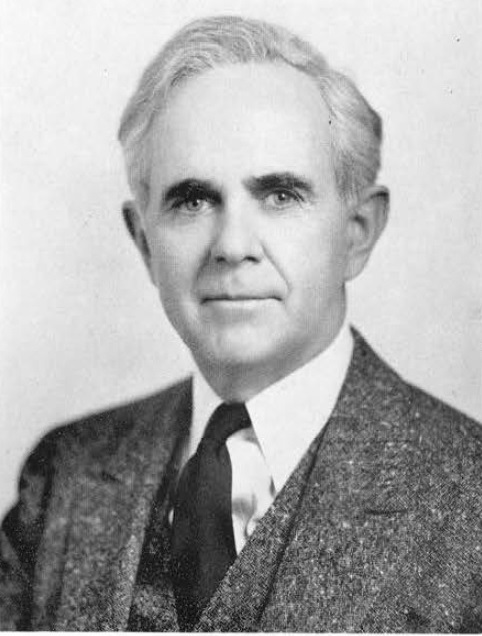
Nominee	John Thomas	Chase A. Clark
Party	Republican	Democratic
Popular vote	90,922	53,399
Percentage	62.56%	36.74%
- County results Thomas: 50–60% 60–70% 70–80% Clark: 50–60% 60–70%
U.S. senator before election
John Thomas
Republican
Elected U.S. Senator
John Thomas
Republican

1928 United States Senate special election in Idaho
Party	Candidate	Votes	%
Republican	John Thomas (incumbent)	90,922	62.56%
Democratic	Chase A. Clark	53,399	36.74%
Socialist	Lundt	1,016	0.70%
Majority		37,523	25.82%
Turnout		145,337	
Republican hold			

== Illinois (special) ==
1928 United States Senate special election in Illinois
- November 6, 1928
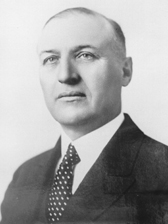

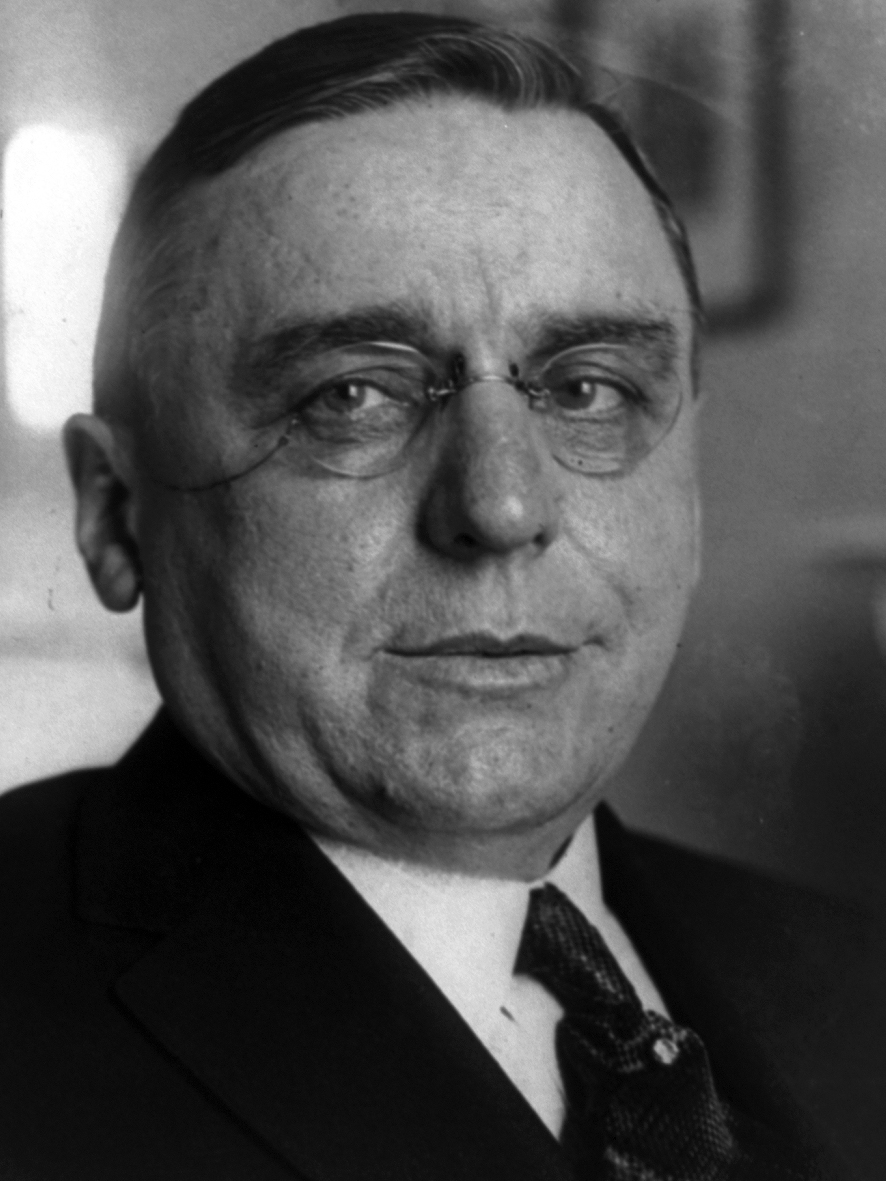
Nominee	Otis F. Glenn	Anton Cermak
Party	Republican	Democratic
Popular vote	1,594,031	1,315,338
Percentage	54.46%	44.94%
- Results by county Glenn: 40–50% 50–60% 60–70% 70–80% 80–90% Cermak: 50–60% 60–70%
U.S. senator before election
Vacant
Elected U.S. senator
Otis F. Glenn
Republican

1928 United States Senate special election in Illinois
Party	Candidate	Votes	%
Republican	Otis F. Glenn	1,594,031	54.46%
Democratic	Anton Cermak	1,315,338	44.94%
Socialist	George Ross Kirkpatrick	13,002	0.44%
Workers	Max Bedacht	3,177	0.11%
Socialist Labor	G. A. Jenning	1,463	0.05%
Majority		278,693	9.52%
Turnout		2,927,011	

== Indiana ==
1928 United States Senate election in Indiana
- November 6, 1928
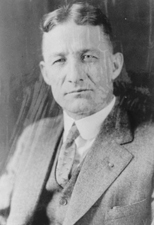

Nominee	Arthur Robinson	Albert Stump
Party	Republican	Democratic
Popular vote	782,144	623,996
Percentage	55.30%	44.12%
- County results Robinson: 50–60% 60–70% Stump: 40–50% 50–60% 60–70%
U.S. senator before election
Arthur Raymond Robinson
Republican
Elected U.S. Senator
Arthur Raymond Robinson
Republican

1928 United States Senate election in Indiana
Party	Candidate	Votes	%
Republican	Arthur Raymond Robinson (Incumbent)	782,144	55.30%
Democratic	Albert Stump	623,996	44.12%
Prohibition	William H. Harris	4,033	0.29%
Socialist	Philip K. Reinbold	3,346	0.24%
Socialist Labor	Charles Ginsberg	443	0.03%
Workers	William F. Jackson	327	0.02%
National	John Zalind	151	0.01%
Majority		158,148	11.18%
Turnout		1,414,440	
Republican hold			

== Maine ==
1928 United States Senate election in Maine
- September 10, 1928
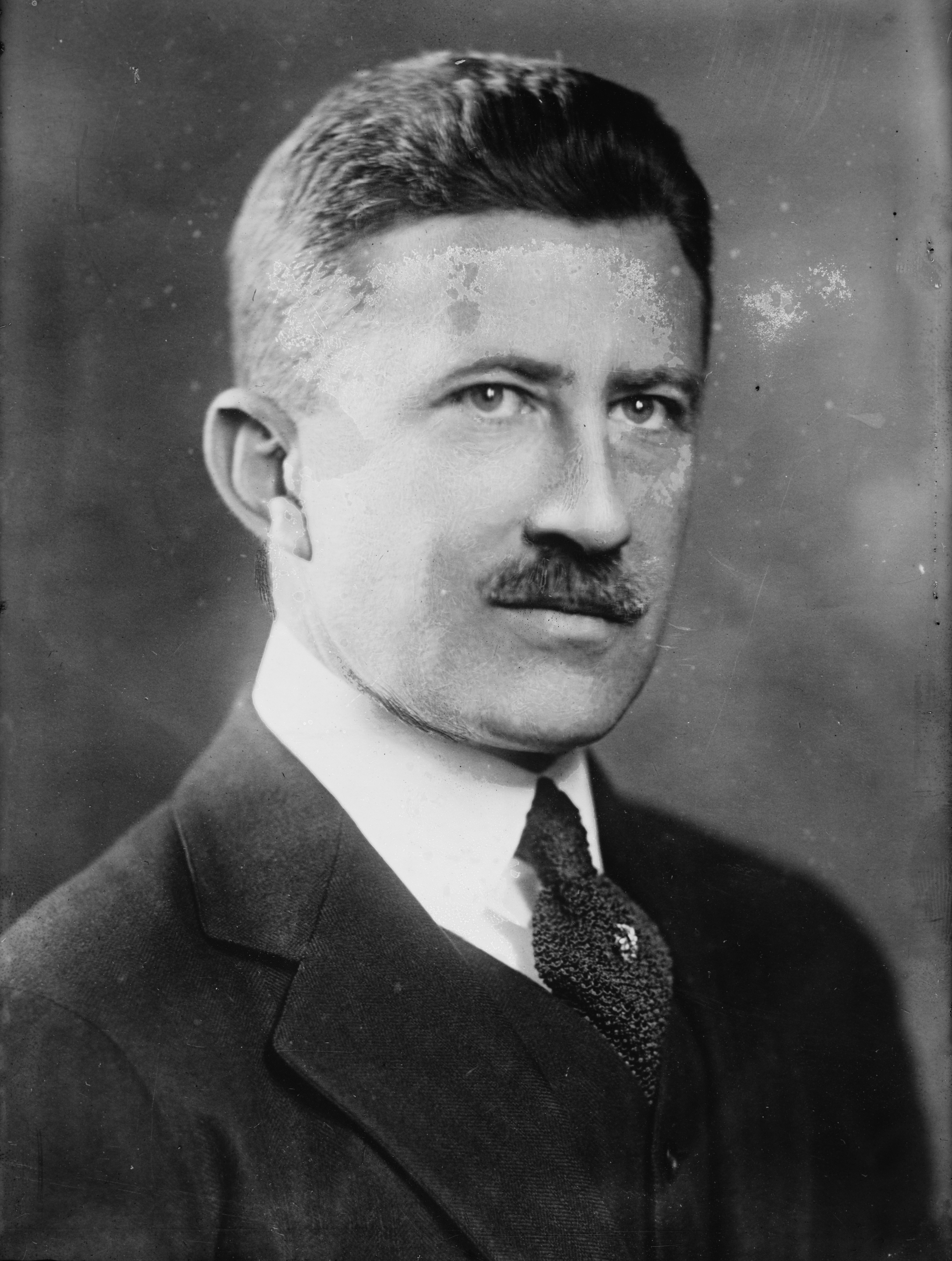

Nominee	Frederick Hale	Herbert E. Holmes
Party	Republican	Democratic
Popular vote	145,501	63,429
Percentage	69.64%	30.36%
- County results Hale: 50–60% 60–70% 70–80%
U.S. senator before election
Frederick Hale
Republican
Elected U.S. Senator
Frederick Hale
Republican

1928 United States Senate election in Maine
Party	Candidate	Votes	%
Republican	Frederick Hale (Incumbent)	245,501	79.47%
Democratic	Herbert E. Holmes	63,429	20.53%
Majority		182,072	58.94%
Turnout		308,930	
Republican hold			

== Maryland ==
1928 United States Senate election in Maryland
- November 5, 1928
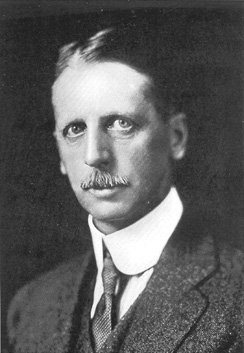

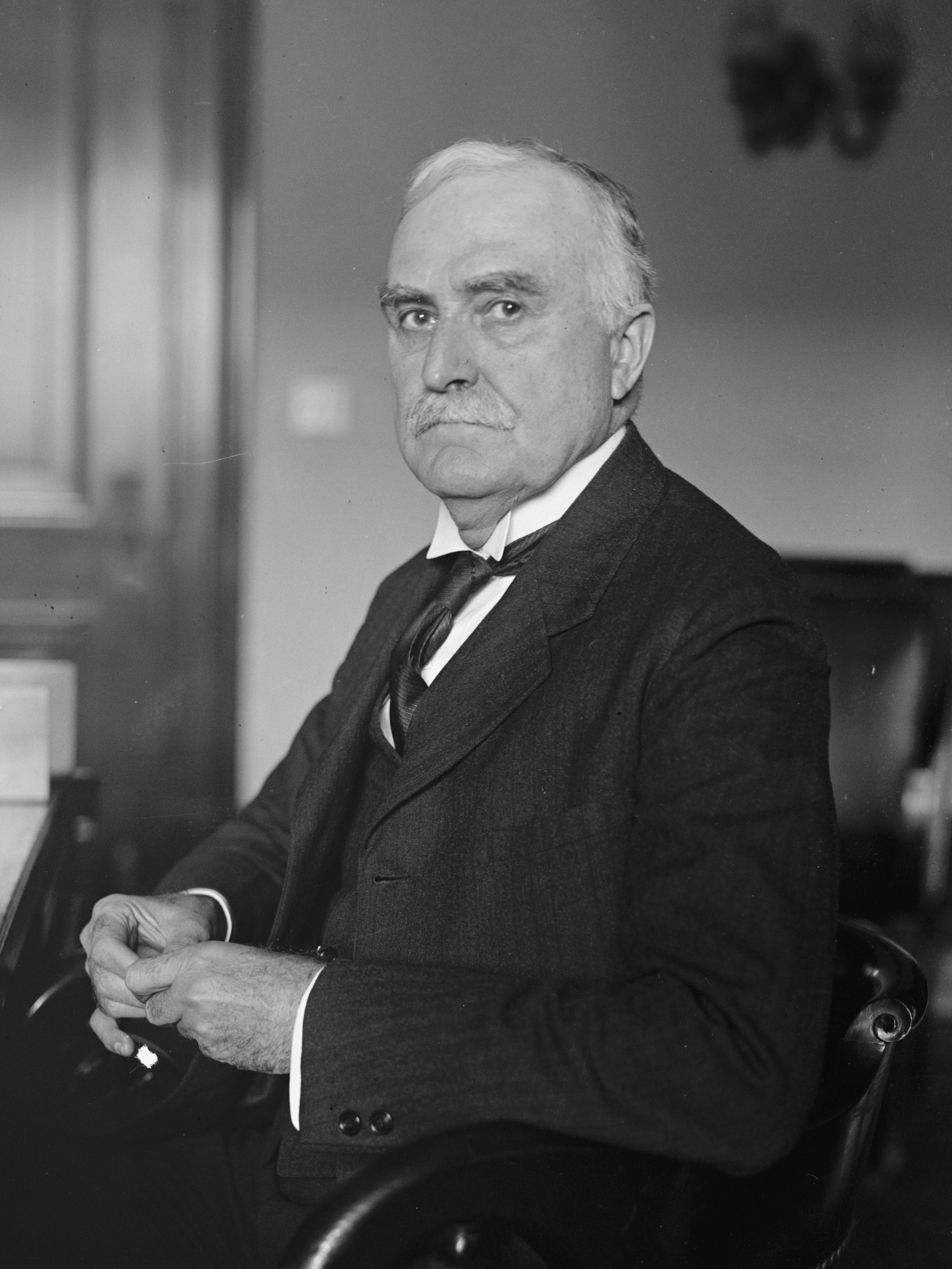
Nominee	Phillips Lee Goldsborough	William Cabell Bruce
Party	Republican	Democratic
Popular vote	256,224	214,447
Percentage	54.05%	45.24%
- County results Goldsborough: 50–60% 60–70% 70–80% Bruce: 50–60% 60–70%
U.S. senator before election
William Cabell Bruce
Democratic
Elected U.S. Senator
Phillips Lee Goldsborough
Republican

1928 United States Senate election in Maryland
Party	Candidate	Votes	%
Republican	Phillips Lee Goldsborough	256,224	54.05%
Democratic	William Cabell Bruce (incumbent)	214,447	45.24%
Socialist	William A Toole	2,026	0.43%
Labor	Robert W. Stevens	1,370	0.29%
Majority		41,777	8.81%
Turnout		474,067	
Republican gain from Democratic			

== Massachusetts ==
1928 United States Senate election in Massachusetts
- November 6, 1928
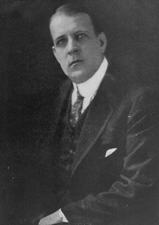

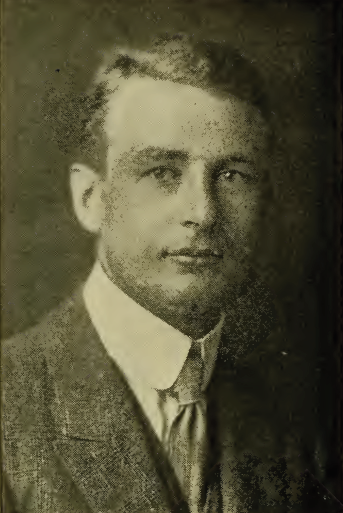
Nominee	David I. Walsh	Benjamin Loring Young
Party	Democratic	Republican
Popular vote	818,055	693,563
Percentage	53.65%	45.48%
- Walsh: 40–50% 50–60% 60–70% 70–80% 80–90% Young: 40–50% 50–60% 60–70% 70–80% 80–90% >90%
Senator before election
David I. Walsh
Democratic
Elected Senator
David I. Walsh
Democratic

1928 United States Senate election in Massachusetts
Party	Candidate	Votes	%	±%
Democratic	David I. Walsh (incumbent)	818,055	53.65	
Republican	Benjamin Loring Young	693,563	45.48	
Socialist	Alfred B. Lewis	7,675	0.50	
Workers	John J. Ballam	5,621	0.37	

== Michigan ==
First-term Democrat Woodbridge N. Ferris died March 23, 1928.

On March 31, 1928, Governor Fred W. Green appointed 44-year-old Republican Arthur H. Vandenberg to fill the vacancy, pending a special election. Green considered resigning so he could be appointed to the vacancy. He also considered several other candidates, including former governors Albert Sleeper and Chase Osborn. In addition, Green considered Representative Joseph W. Fordney, who would have been a placeholder until the election for the remainder of Ferris' term. Green finally decided upon Vandenberg, who immediately declared his intention to stand for election to both the short, unexpired term and the full six-year term. Both the special and the general elections were held the same day, November 6, 1928.

=== Michigan (regular) ===
1928 United States Senate election in Michigan
- November 6, 1928
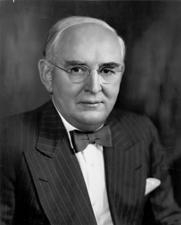

Nominee	Arthur Vandenberg	John W. Bailey
Party	Republican	Democratic
Popular vote	977,893	376,592
Percentage	71.79%	27.65%
- County results Vandenberg: 50–60% 60–70% 70–80% 80–90% >90%
U.S. senator before election
Arthur Vandenberg
Republican
Elected U.S. Senator
Arthur Vandenberg
Republican

1928 United States Senate election in Michigan
Party	Candidate	Votes	%
Republican	Arthur Vandenberg (Incumbent)	977,893	71.79%
Democratic	John W. Bailey	376,592	27.65%
Socialist	William L. Krieghoff	2,796	0.21%
Workers	Ben A. Faulkner	2,249	0.17%
Prohibition	Duly McCone	1,927	0.14%
Socialist Labor	David Boyd	689	0.05%
Majority		601,301	44.14%
Turnout		1,362,146	
Republican hold			

=== Michigan (special) ===
1928 United States Senate special election in Michigan
Party	Candidate	Votes	%
Republican	Arthur Vandenberg (Incumbent)	974,203	72.03%
Democratic	John W. Bailey	375,673	27.77%
Socialist	Francis W. Elliott	2,682	0.20%
None	Scattering	3	0.00%
Majority		598,530	44.26%
Turnout		1,352,561	
Republican hold			

== Minnesota ==
1928 United States Senate election in Minnesota
- November 6, 1928
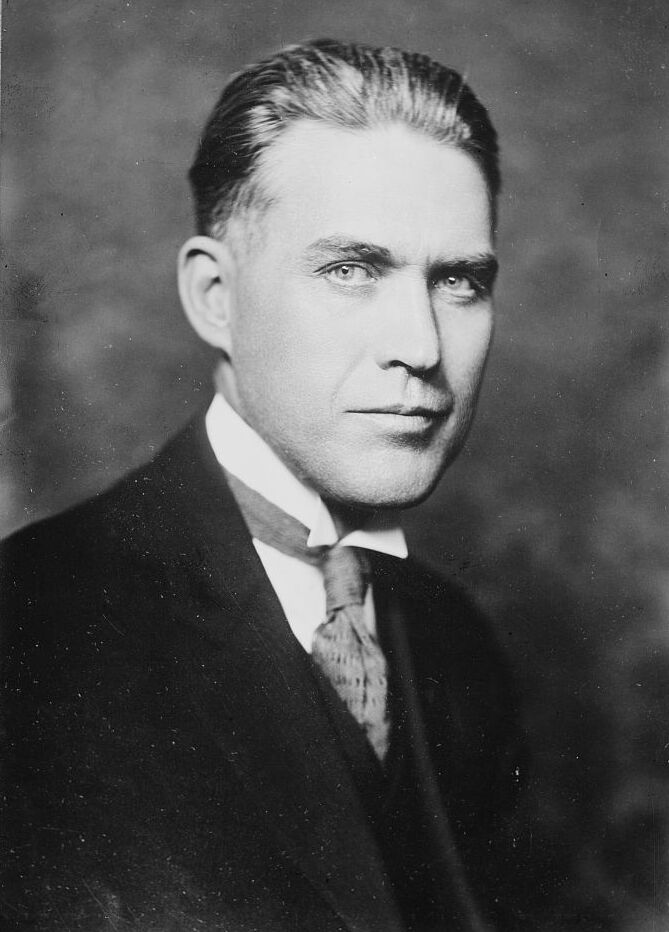

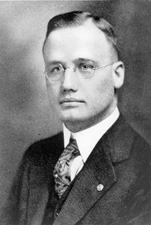
Nominee	Henrik Shipstead	Arthur E. Nelson
Party	Farmer–Labor	Republican
Popular vote	665,169	342,992
Percentage	65.38%	33.71%
- County results Shipstead: 50–60% 60–70% 70–80% 80–90%
U.S. senator before election
Henrik Shipstead
Farmer–Labor
Elected U.S. Senator
Henrik Shipstead
Farmer–Labor

1928 United States Senate election in Minnesota
Party	Candidate	Votes	%
Farmer–Labor	Henrik Shipstead (Incumbent)	665,169	65.37%
Republican	Arthur E. Nelson	342,992	33.71%
Workers (Communist)	Vincent R. Dunne	9,380	0.92%
Majority		322,177	31.66%
Turnout		1,017,541	
Farmer–Labor hold			

== Mississippi ==
1928 United States Senate election in Mississippi
Party	Candidate	Votes	%
Democratic	Hubert D. Stephens (Incumbent)	111,180	100.00%
Democratic hold			

== Missouri ==
1928 United States Senate election in Missouri
- November 6, 1928
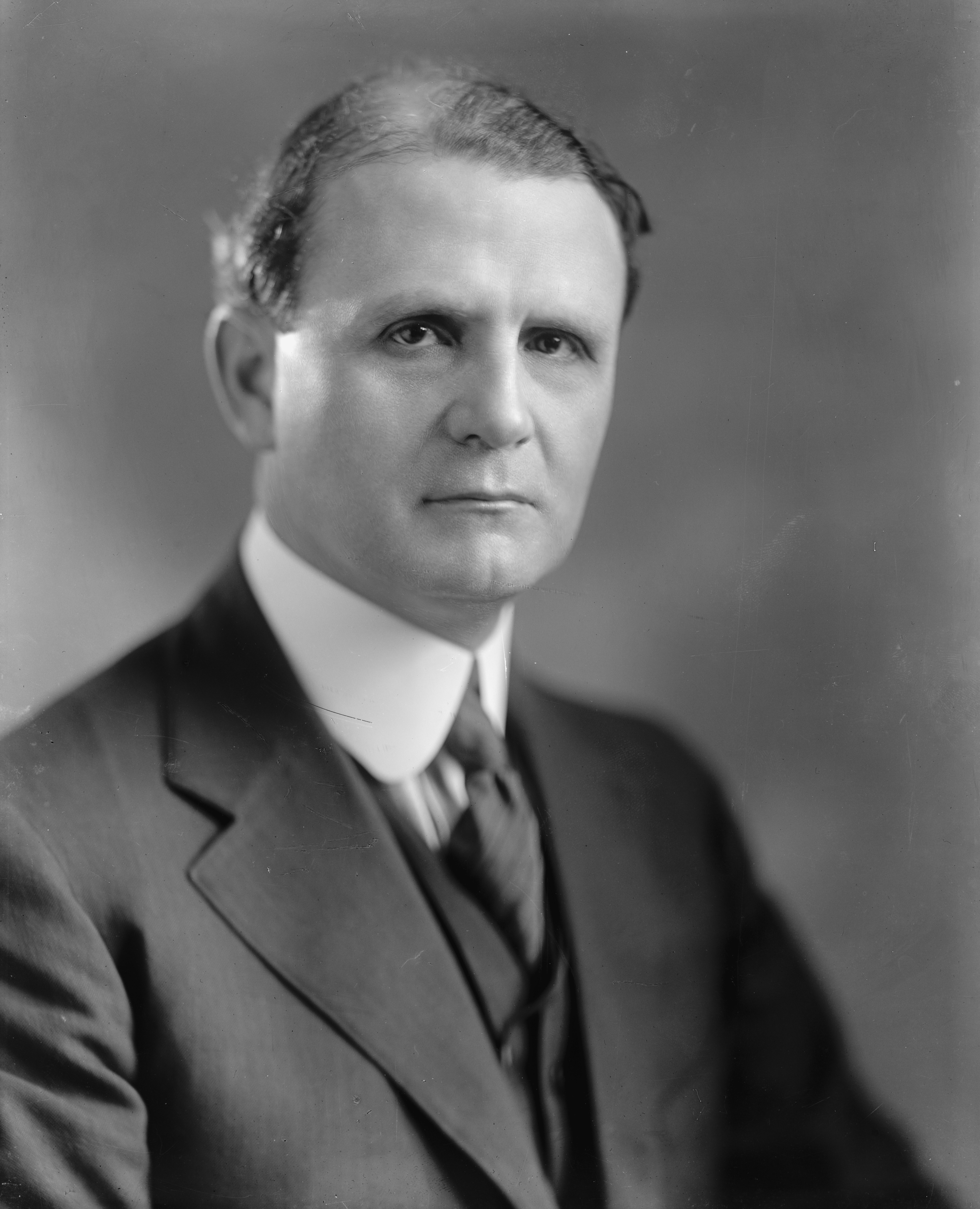

Nominee	Roscoe C. Patterson	Charles M. Hay
Party	Republican	Democratic
Popular vote	787,499	726,322
Percentage	51.91%	47.88%
- County Results; Patterson: 50–60% 60–70% 70–80% 80–90% Hay: 50–60% 60–70% 70–80% 80–90% Tie: 40–50%
U.S. senator before election
James A. Reed
Democratic
Elected U.S. Senator
Roscoe C. Patterson
Republican

1928 Missouri United States Senate election
Party	Candidate	Votes	%
Republican	Roscoe C. Patterson	787,499	51.91%
Democratic	Charles M. Hay	726,322	47.88%
Socialist	Charles H. Harrison	2,845	0.19%
Socialist Labor	William Wesley Cox	257	0.02%
Majority		61,177	4.03%
Turnout		1,516,923	
Republican gain from Democratic			

== Montana ==
1928 United States Senate election in Montana
- November 6, 1928
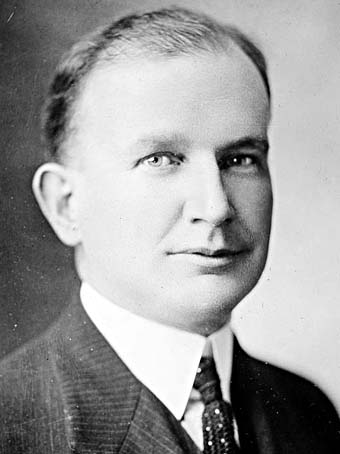

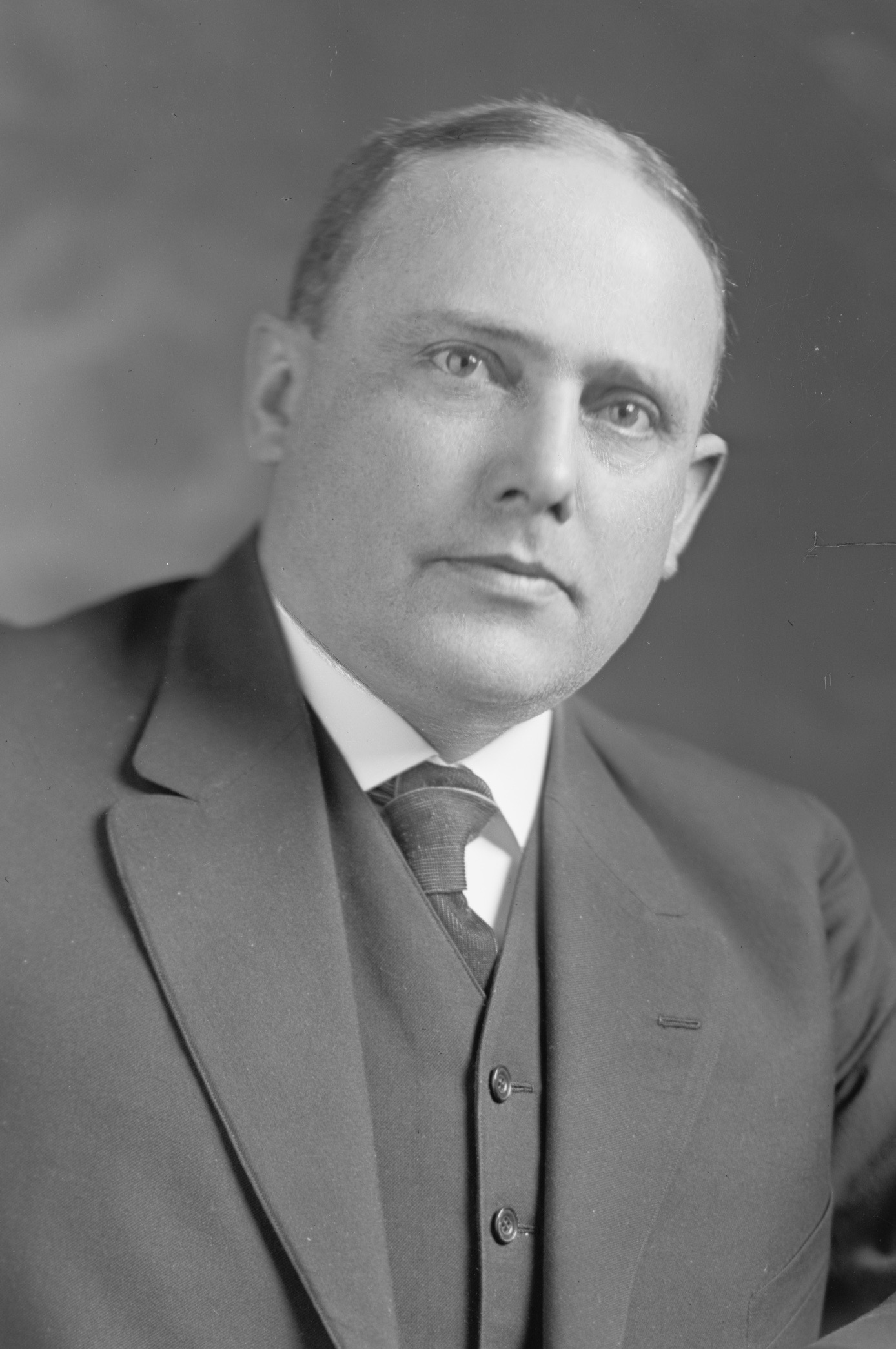
Nominee	Burton K. Wheeler	Joseph M. Dixon
Party	Democratic	Republican
Popular vote	103,655	91,185
Percentage	53.20%	46.80%
- County Results; Wheeler: 50–60% 60–70% 70–80% Dixon: 50–60% 60–70%
U.S. senator before election
Burton K. Wheeler
Democratic
Elected U.S. Senator
Burton K. Wheeler
Democratic

1928 United States Senate election in Montana
Party	Candidate	Votes	%
Democratic	Burton K. Wheeler (Incumbent)	103,655	53.20%
Republican	Joseph M. Dixon	91,185	46.80%
Majority		12,470	6.40%
Turnout		194,840	
Democratic hold			

== Nebraska ==
1928 United States Senate election in Nebraska
- November 6, 1928
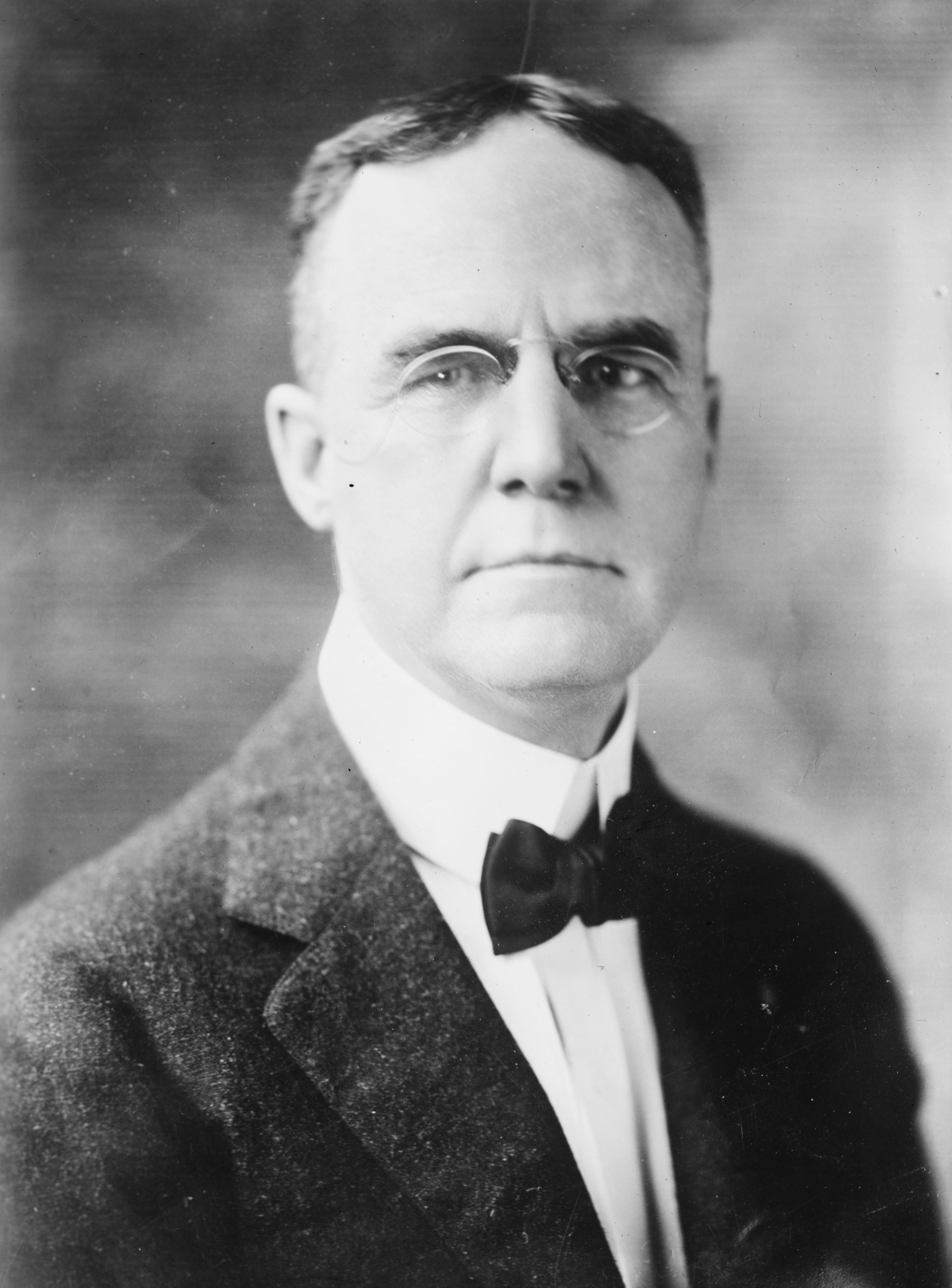

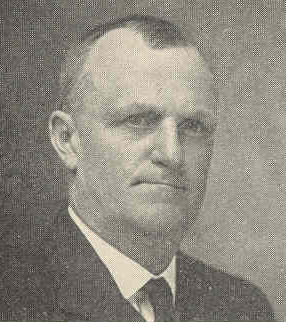
Nominee	Robert B. Howell	Richard L. Metcalfe
Party	Republican	Democratic
Popular vote	324,014	204,737
Percentage	61.28%	38.72%
- County results Howell: 50–60% 60–70% 70–80% 80–90% Metcalfe: 50–60%
U.S. senator before election
Robert B. Howell
Republican
Elected U.S. Senator
Robert B. Howell
Republican

1928 United States Senate election in Nebraska
Party	Candidate	Votes	%
Republican	Robert B. Howell (Incumbent)	324,014	61.28%
Democratic	Richard L. Metcalfe	204,737	38.72%
None	Scattering	1	0.00%
Majority		119,277	22.56%
Turnout		528,752	
Republican hold			

== Nevada ==
1928 United States Senate election in Nevada
- November 6, 1928
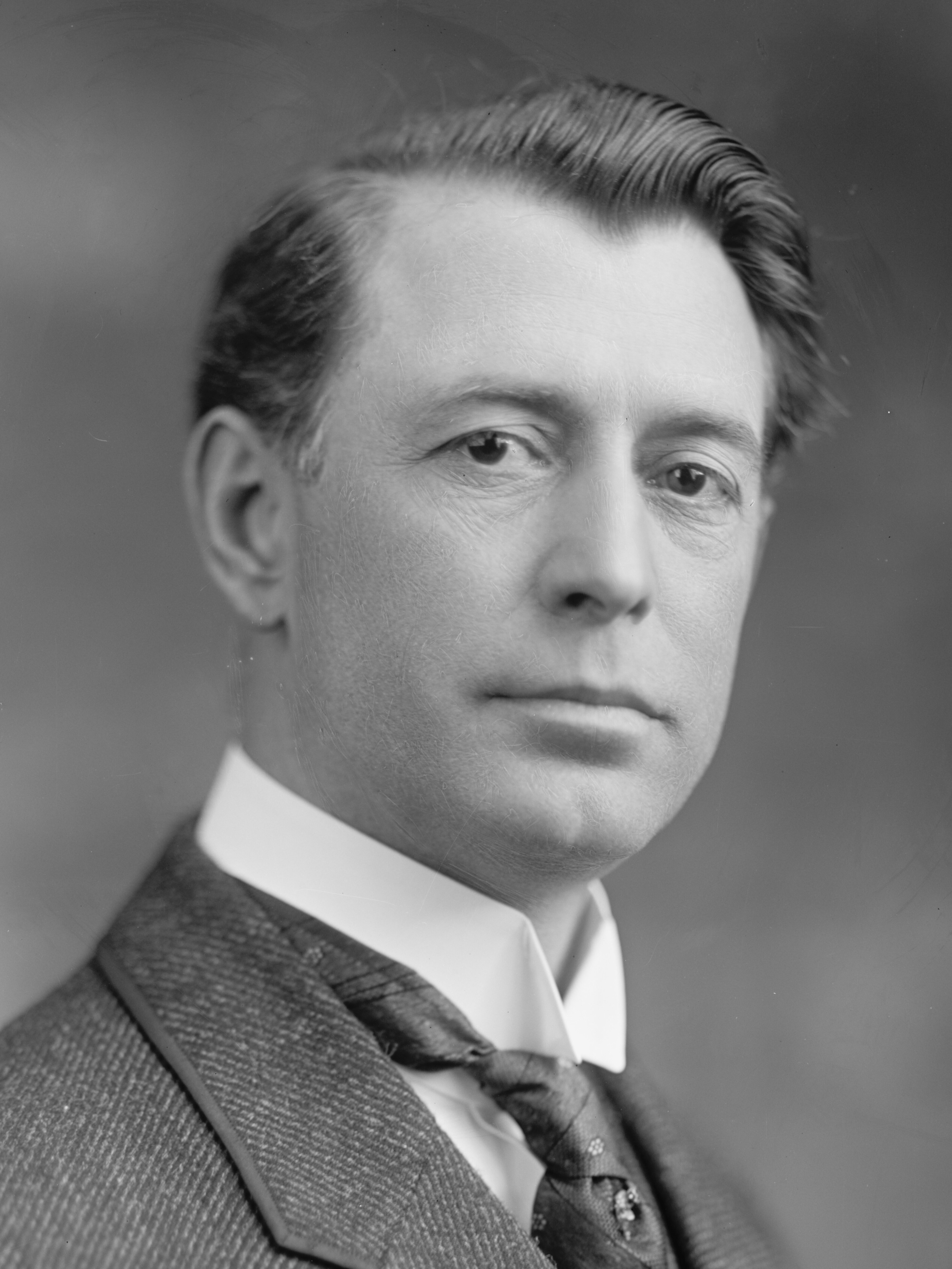

Nominee	Key Pittman	Samuel Platt
Party	Democratic	Republican
Popular vote	19,515	13,414
Percentage	59.26%	40.74%
- County results Pittman: 50–60% 60–70% 70–80% Platt: 50–60%
U.S. senator before election
Key Pittman
Democratic
Elected U.S. Senator
Key Pittman
Democratic

1928 United States Senate election in Nevada
Party	Candidate	Votes	%
Democratic	Key Pittman (Incumbent)	19,515	59.26%
Republican	Samuel Platt	13,414	40.74%
Majority		6,101	18.52%
Turnout		32,929	
Democratic hold			

== New Jersey ==
1928 United States Senate election in New Jersey
- November 6, 1928
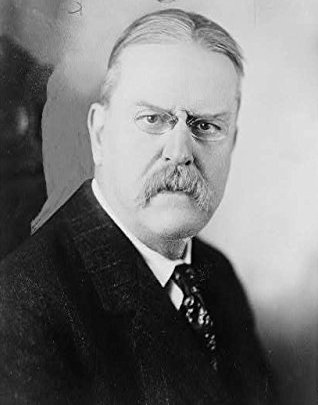

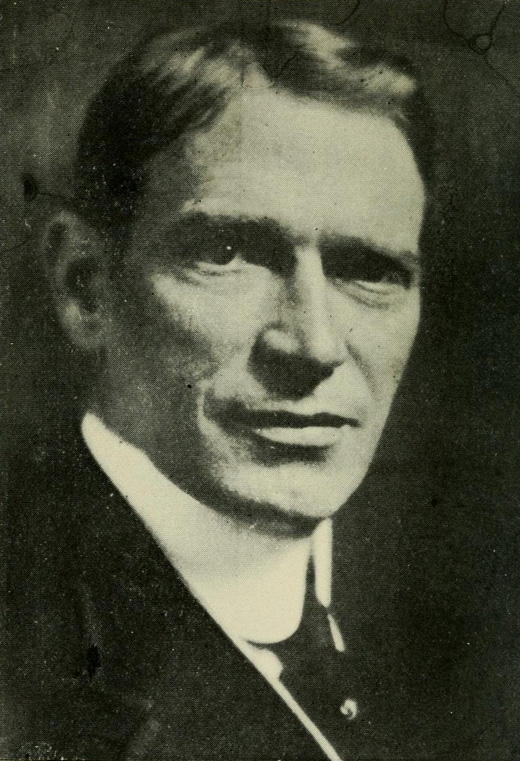
Nominee	Hamilton Fish Kean	Edward I. Edwards
Party	Republican	Democratic
Popular vote	841,752	608,623
Percentage	57.87%	41.84%
- County results Kean: 50–60% 60–70% 70–80% Edwards: 60–70%
Senator before election
Edward I. Edwards
Democratic
Elected Senator
Hamilton Fish Kean
Republican

1928 United States Senate election in New Jersey
Party	Candidate	Votes	%
Republican	Hamilton Fish Kean	841,752	57.87%
Democratic	Edward I. Edwards (incumbent)	608,623	41.84%
Socialist	Charlotte L. Bohlin	2,267	0.16%
Workers	Albert Weisbrod	1,333	0.09%
Prohibition	Will D. Martin	372	0.03%
Socialist Labor	Frank Sanders	280	0.02%
Majority		232,129	16.03%
Turnout		1,454,627	
Republican gain from Democratic			

== New Mexico ==
Two-term Democrat Andrieus A. Jones died December 20, 1927. Republican Bronson M. Cutting was appointed December 29, 1927, to continue the term, pending a special election in which he was not a candidate.

=== New Mexico (special) ===
1928 United States Senate special election in New Mexico
- November 6, 1928
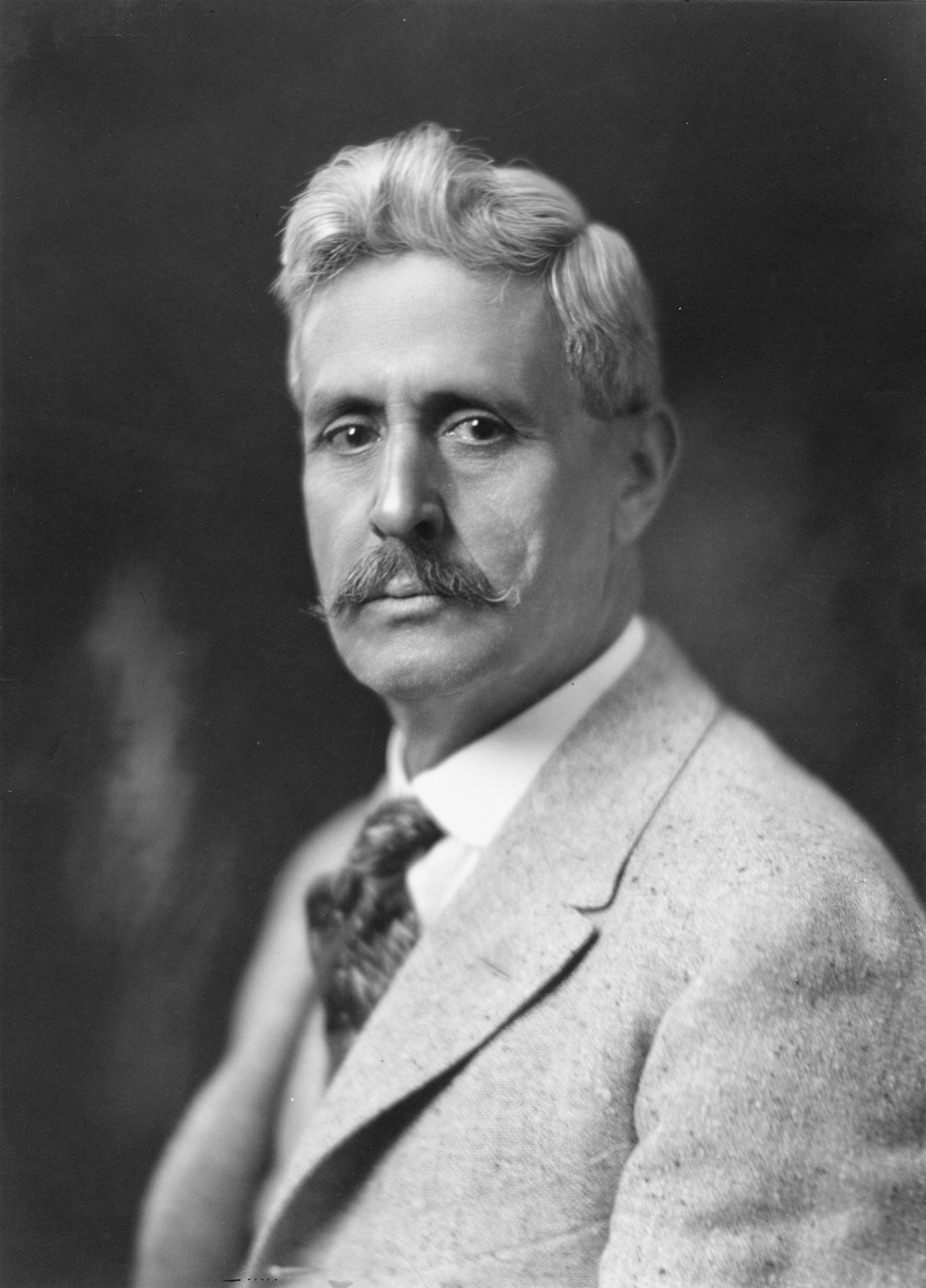
Nominee	Octavio A. Larrazolo	Juan N. Vigil
Party	Republican	Democratic
Popular vote	64,623	51,495
Percentage	55.65%	44.35%
- County results Larrazolo: 50–60% 60–70% 70–80% Vigil: 50–60% 60–70%
U.S. senator before election
Bronson M. Cutting
Republican
Elected U.S. Senator
Octavio A. Larrazolo
Republican

1928 United States Senate special election in New Mexico
Party	Candidate	Votes	%
Republican	Octavio A. Larrazolo	64,623	55.65%
Democratic	Juan N. Vigil	51,495	44.35%
Majority		13,128	11.30%
Turnout		116,118	
Republican hold			

Larrazolo was not a candidate, however, for the next term. After leaving office, Larrazolo died on April 7, 1930.

=== New Mexico (regular) ===
1928 United States Senate election in New Mexico
- November 6, 1928
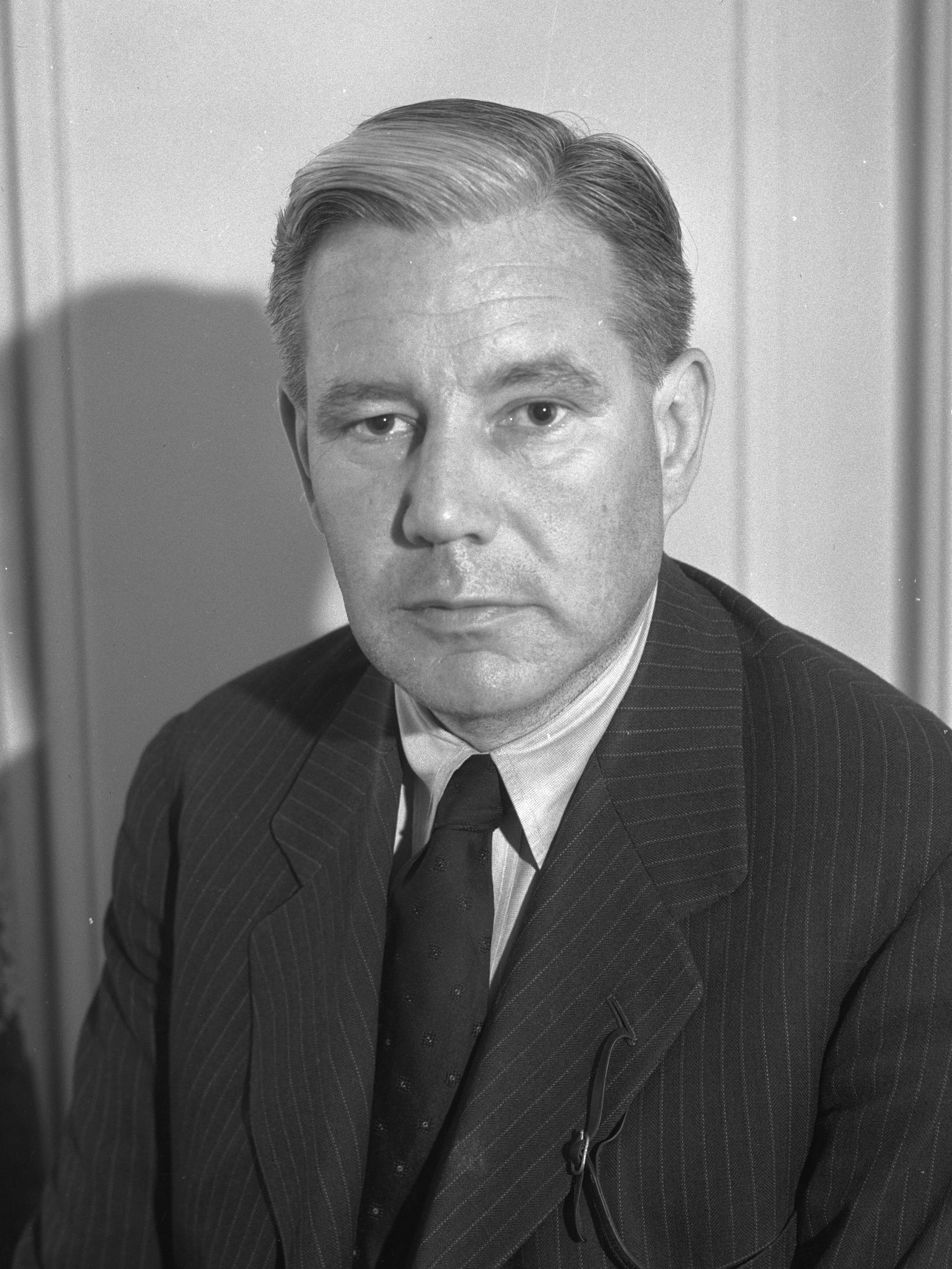
Nominee	Bronson M. Cutting	Jethro S. Vaught
Party	Republican	Democratic
Popular vote	68,070	49,913
Percentage	57.69%	42.31%
- County results Cutting: 50–60% 60–70% 70–80% Vaught: 50–60% 60–70%
U.S. senator before election
Bronson M. Cutting
Republican
Elected U.S. Senator
Bronson M. Cutting
Republican

1928 United States Senate election in New Mexico
Party	Candidate	Votes	%
Republican	Bronson M. Cutting (Incumbent)	68,070	57.69%
Democratic	Jethro S. Vaught	49,913	42.31%
Majority		18,157	15.38%
Turnout		117,983	
Republican hold			

Cutting would be re-elected in 1934 but died May 6, 1935.

== New York ==
1928 United States Senate election in New York
- November 6, 1928
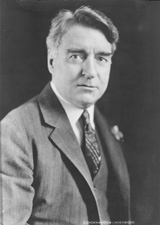

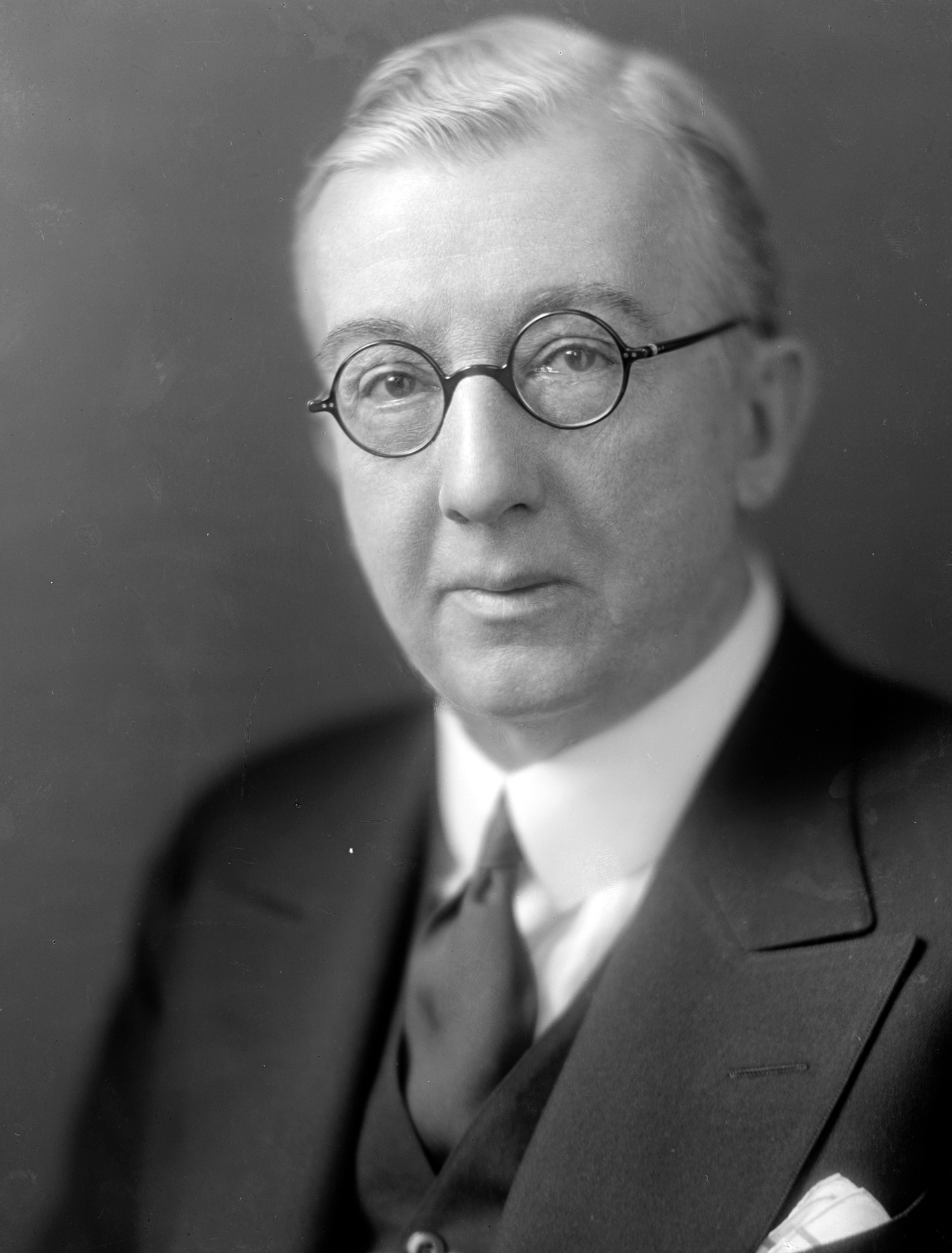
Nominee	Royal S. Copeland	Alanson B. Houghton
Party	Democratic	Republican
Popular vote	2,084,273	2,034,014
Percentage	49.08%	47.89%
- County Results; Copeland: 40–50% 50–60% 60–70% 70–80% Houghton: 50–60% 60–70% 70–80%
Senator before election
Royal S. Copeland
Democratic
Elected Senator
Royal S. Copeland
Democratic

1928 United States Senate election in New York
Party	Candidate	Votes	%
Democratic	Royal S. Copeland (incumbent)	2,084,273	49.08%
Republican	Alanson B. Houghton	2,034,014	47.89%
Socialist	McAlister Coleman	111,208	2.62%
Workers	Robert Minor	11,956	0.28%
Socialist Labor	Henry Kuhn	5,543	0.13%
Majority		50,259	1.19%
Turnout		4,246,994	
Democratic hold			

== North Dakota ==
1928 United States Senate election in North Dakota
- November 6, 1928
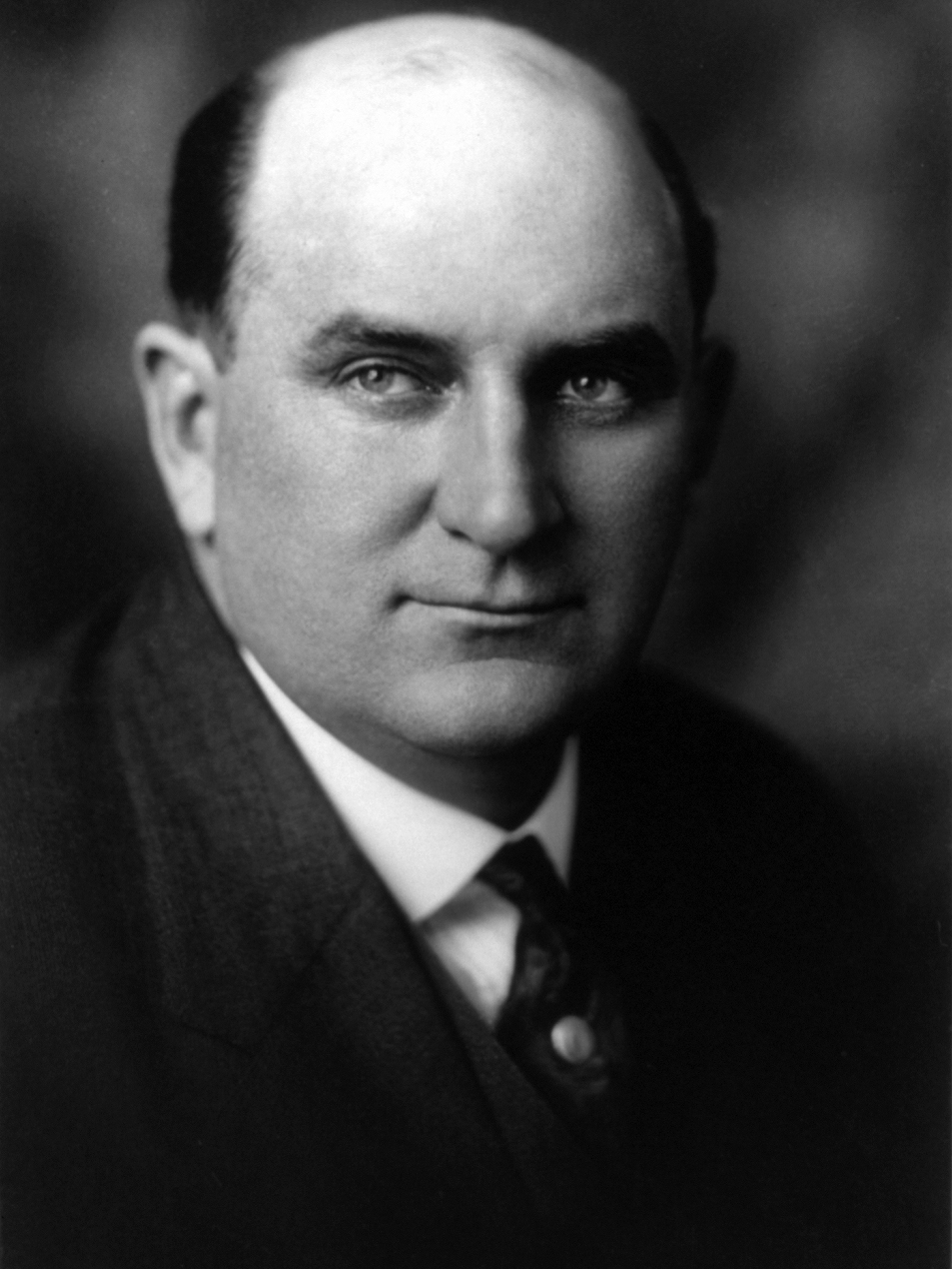

Nominee	Lynn Frazier	F. F. Burchard
Party	Republican	Democratic
Popular vote	159,940	38,856
Percentage	79.63%	19.35%
- County results Frazier: 60–70% 70–80% 80–90% 90–100%
U.S. senator before election
Lynn Frazier
Republican
Elected U.S. Senator
Lynn Frazier
Republican

1928 United States Senate election in North Dakota
Party	Candidate	Votes	%	±%
Republican	Lynn Frazier (inc.)	159,940	79.63%	+27.35%
Democratic	F. F. Burchard	38,856	19.35%	−28.37%
Farmer–Labor	Alfred Knutson	2,047	1.02%	—
Majority		121,084	60.29%	+55.72%
Turnout		200,843		
Republican hold				

== Ohio ==
There were 2 elections due to the March 30, 1928, death of Republican Frank B. Willis.

=== Ohio (regular) ===
1928 United States Senate election in Ohio
- November 6, 1928
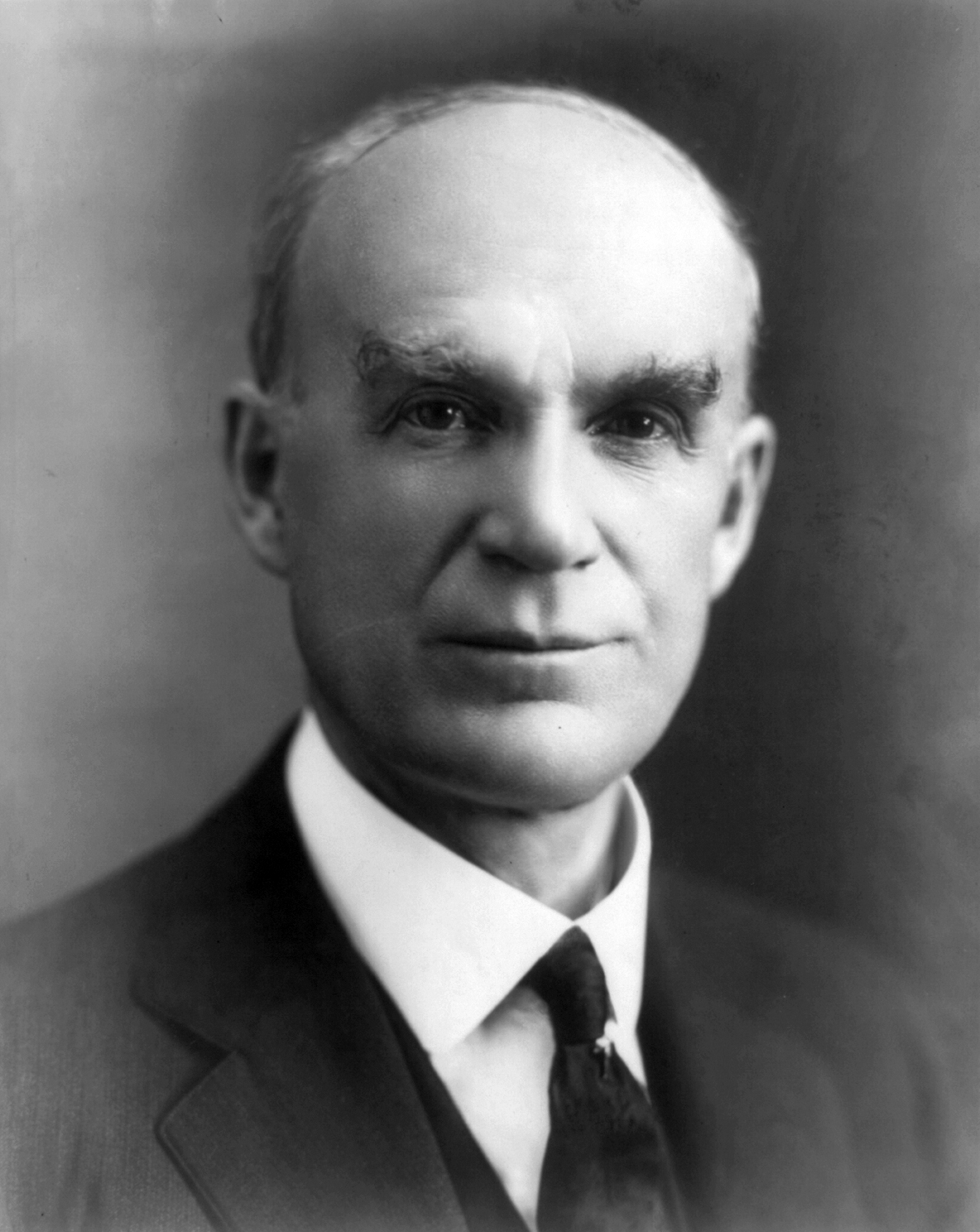

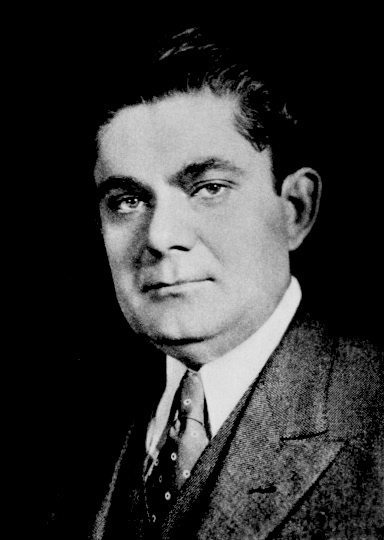
Nominee	Simeon D. Fess	Charles V. Truax
Party	Republican	Democratic
Popular vote	1,412,805	908,952
Percentage	60.73%	39.07%
- County results Fess: 50–60% 60–70% 70–80% Traux: 50–60% 60–70%
U.S. senator before election
Simeon D. Fess
Republican
Elected U.S. Senator
Simeon D. Fess
Republican

Ohio General election
Party	Candidate	Votes	%
Republican	Simeon D. Fess (Incumbent)	1,412,805	60.73%
Democratic	Charles V. Truax	908,952	39.07%
Independent	Joseph Willnecker	2,061	0.09%
Independent	James Goward	1,384	0.06%
Independent	J. Wetherell Hutton	1,003	0.04%
Majority		503,853	21.66%
Turnout		2,326,205	
Republican hold			

=== Ohio (special) ===
1928 United States Senate special election in Ohio
- November 6, 1928
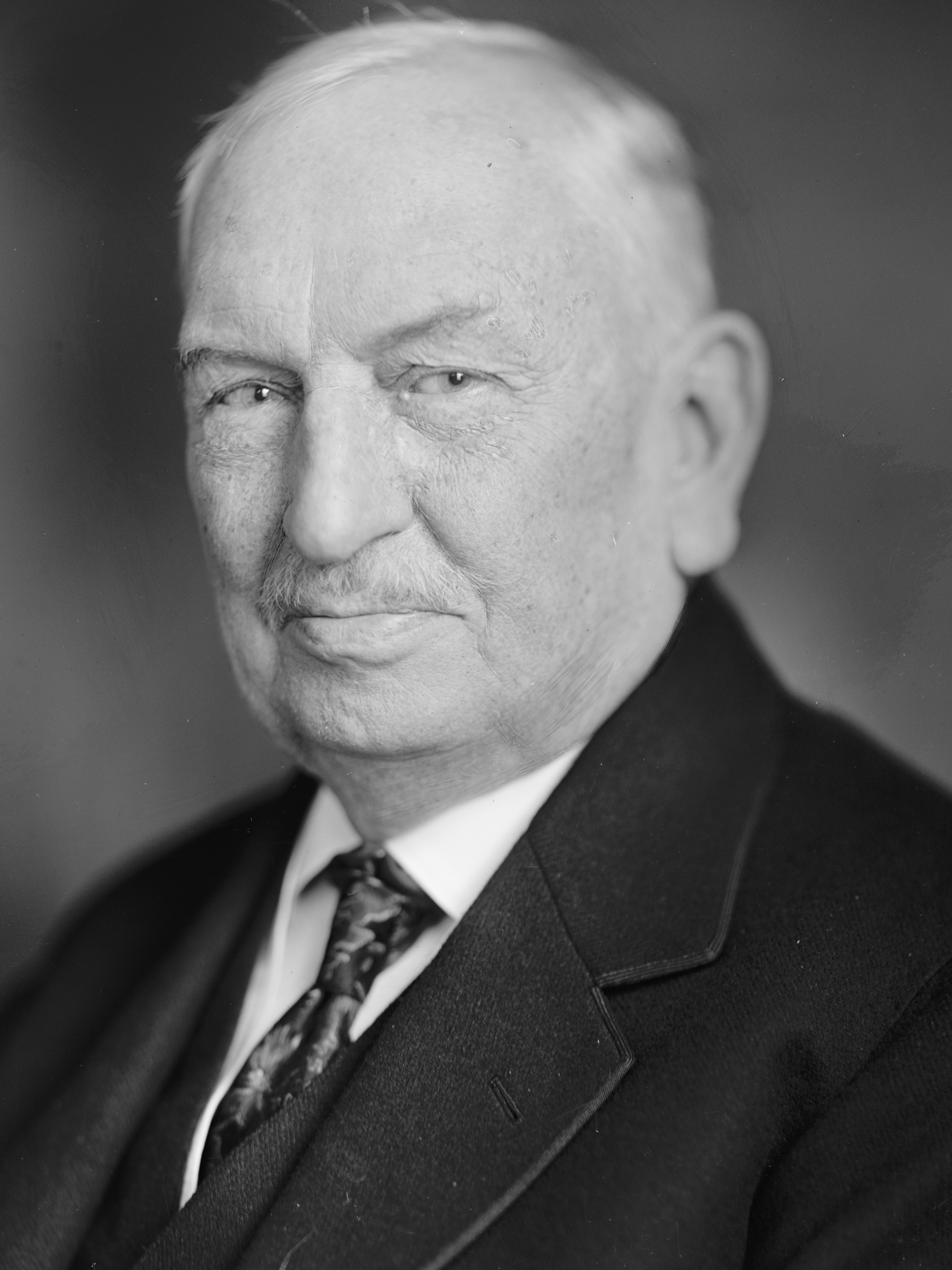
Nominee	Theodore E. Burton	Graham P. Hunt
Party	Republican	Democratic
Popular vote	1,429,554	856,807
Percentage	62.43%	37.42%
- County results Burton: 50–60% 60–70% 70–80% Hunt: 50–60% 60–70%
U.S. senator before election
Cyrus Locher
Democratic
Elected U.S. Senator
Theodore E. Burton
Republican

Democrat Cyrus Locher was appointed April 5, 1928, to continue the term, pending the special election, in which he lost his party's nomination.

Ohio special election
Party	Candidate	Votes	%
Republican	Theodore E. Burton	1,429,554	62.43%
Democratic	Graham P. Hunt	856,807	37.42%
Independent	Israel Amter	2,062	0.09%
Independent	Anna K. Storck	1,389	0.06%
Majority		572,747	25.01%
Turnout		2,289,812	
Republican gain from Democratic			

Burton, in turn, died October 28, 1929, triggering another interim appointment and special election before the 1933 end of the term.

== Pennsylvania ==
1928 United States Senate election in Pennsylvania
- November 6, 1928
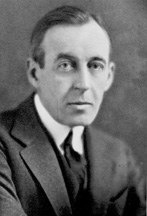

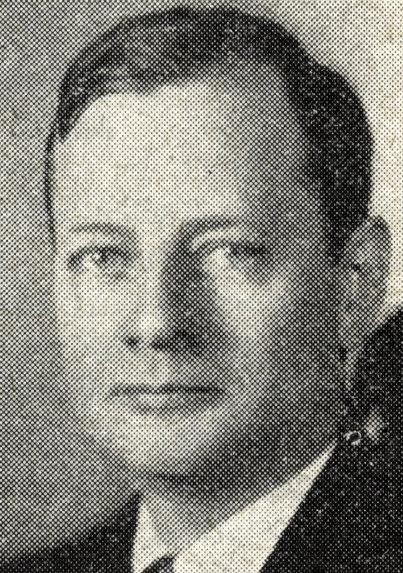
Nominee	David A. Reed	William N. McNair
Party	Republican	Democratic
Popular vote	1,948,646	1,029,055
Percentage	64.38%	34.00%
- County Results: Reed: 50–60% 60–70% 70–80% 80–90% McNair: 50–60%
U.S. senator before election
David A. Reed
Republican
Elected U.S. Senator
David A. Reed
Republican

General election results
Party	Candidate	Votes	%	±%
Republican	David A. Reed (inc.)	1,948,646	64.38%	+8.77%
Democratic	William N. McNair	1,029,055	34.00%	+3.87%
Socialist	William J. Van Essen	23,100	0.76%	−1.53%
Prohibition	Elisha K. Kane	14,866	0.49%	−2.42%
Socialist Labor	Charles Kutz	7,524	0.25%	+0.25%
Workers	W. J. White	2,420	0.08%	+0.08%
Socialist Labor	William H. Thomas	1,234	0.04%	+0.04%
N/A	Other	19	0.00%	N/A
Totals		3,026,864	100.00%	

== Rhode Island ==
1928 United States Senate election in Rhode Island
Party	Candidate	Votes	%
Republican	Felix Hebert	119,228	50.57%
Democratic	Peter G. Gerry (Incumbent)	116,234	49.30%
Workers	James P. Reid	313	0.13%
Majority		2,994	1.27%
Turnout		235,775	
Republican gain from Democratic			

== Tennessee ==
1928 United States Senate election in Tennessee
- November 6, 1928
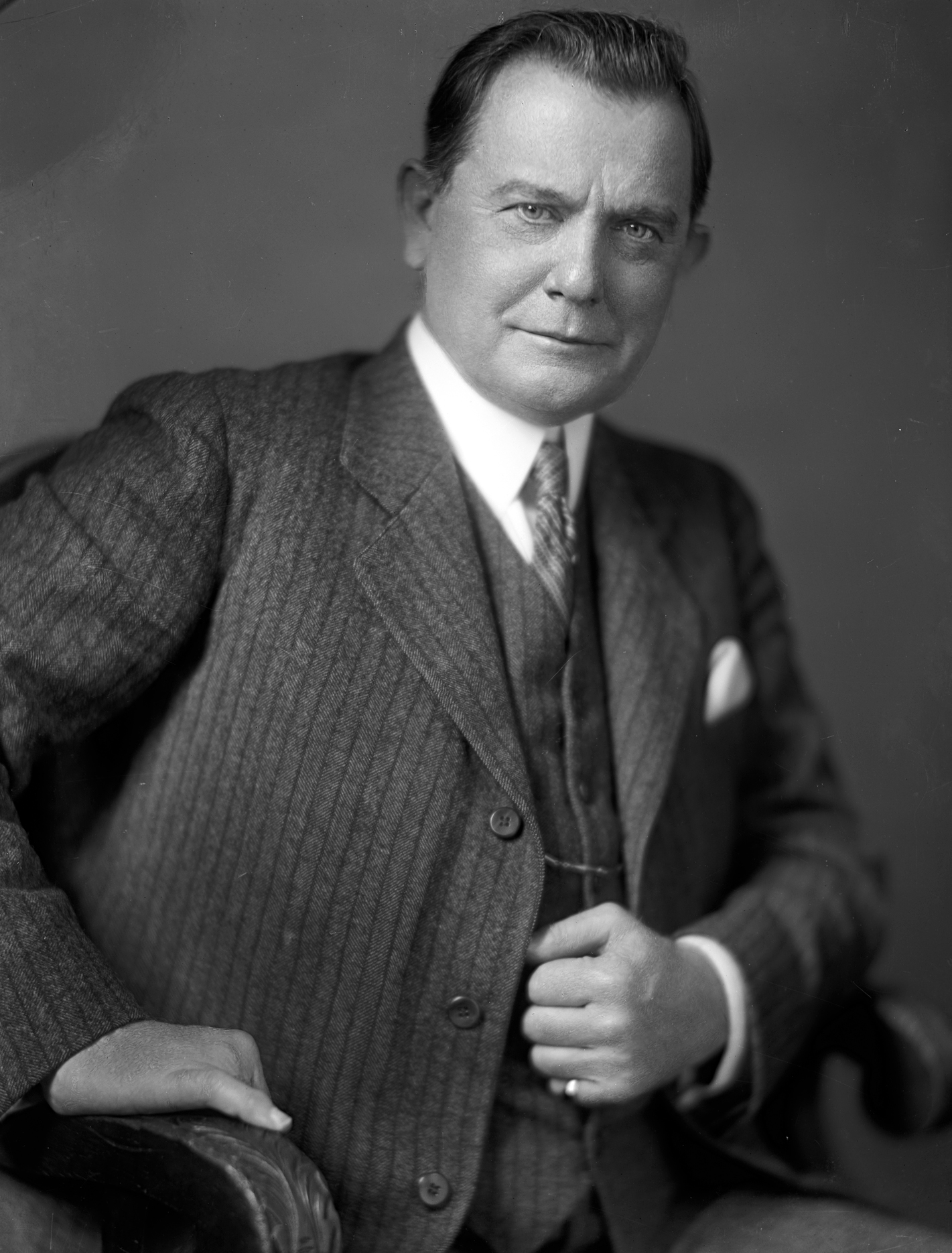

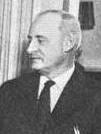
Nominee	Kenneth McKellar	James A. Fowler
Party	Democratic	Republican
Popular vote	175,431	120,289
Percentage	59.32%	40.68%
- McKellar: 50–60% 60–70% 70–80% 80–90% >90% Fowler: 50–60% 60–70% 70–80% 80–90%
U.S. senator before election
Kenneth McKellar
Democratic
Elected U.S. senator
Kenneth McKellar
Democratic

1928 United States Senate election in Tennessee
Party	Candidate	Votes	%
Democratic	Kenneth D. McKellar (Incumbent)	175,329	59.32%
Republican	James Alexander Fowler	120,259	40.68%
Majority		55,070	18.64%
Turnout		295,588	
Democratic hold			

== Texas ==
1928 United States Senate election in Texas
- November 6, 1928
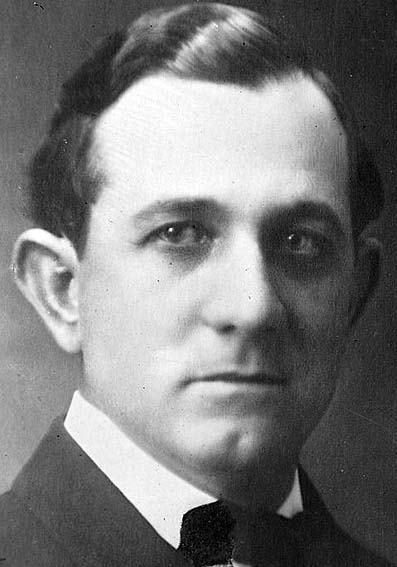

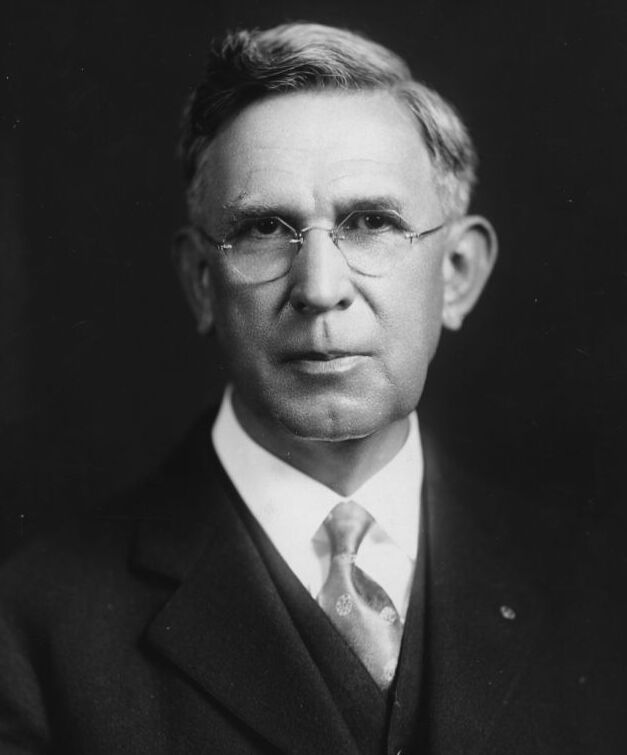
Nominee	Tom Connally	T. M. Kennerly
Party	Democratic	Republican
Popular vote	566,139	129,910
Percentage	81.24%	18.64%
- County Results Connally: 50–60% 60–70% 70–80% 80–90% >90% Kennerly: 50–60% 60–70% No vote
U.S. senator before election
Earle Mayfield
Democratic
Elected U.S. Senator
Tom Connally
Democratic

1928 United States Senate election in Texas
Party	Candidate	Votes	%
Democratic	Tom Connally	566,139	81.24%
Republican	Thomas Martin Kennerly	129,910	18.64%
Socialist	David Curran	690	0.10%
Communist	John Rust	114	0.02%
Majority		436,229	62.60%
Turnout		696,853	
Democratic hold			

== Utah ==
1928 United States Senate election in Utah
- November 6, 1928
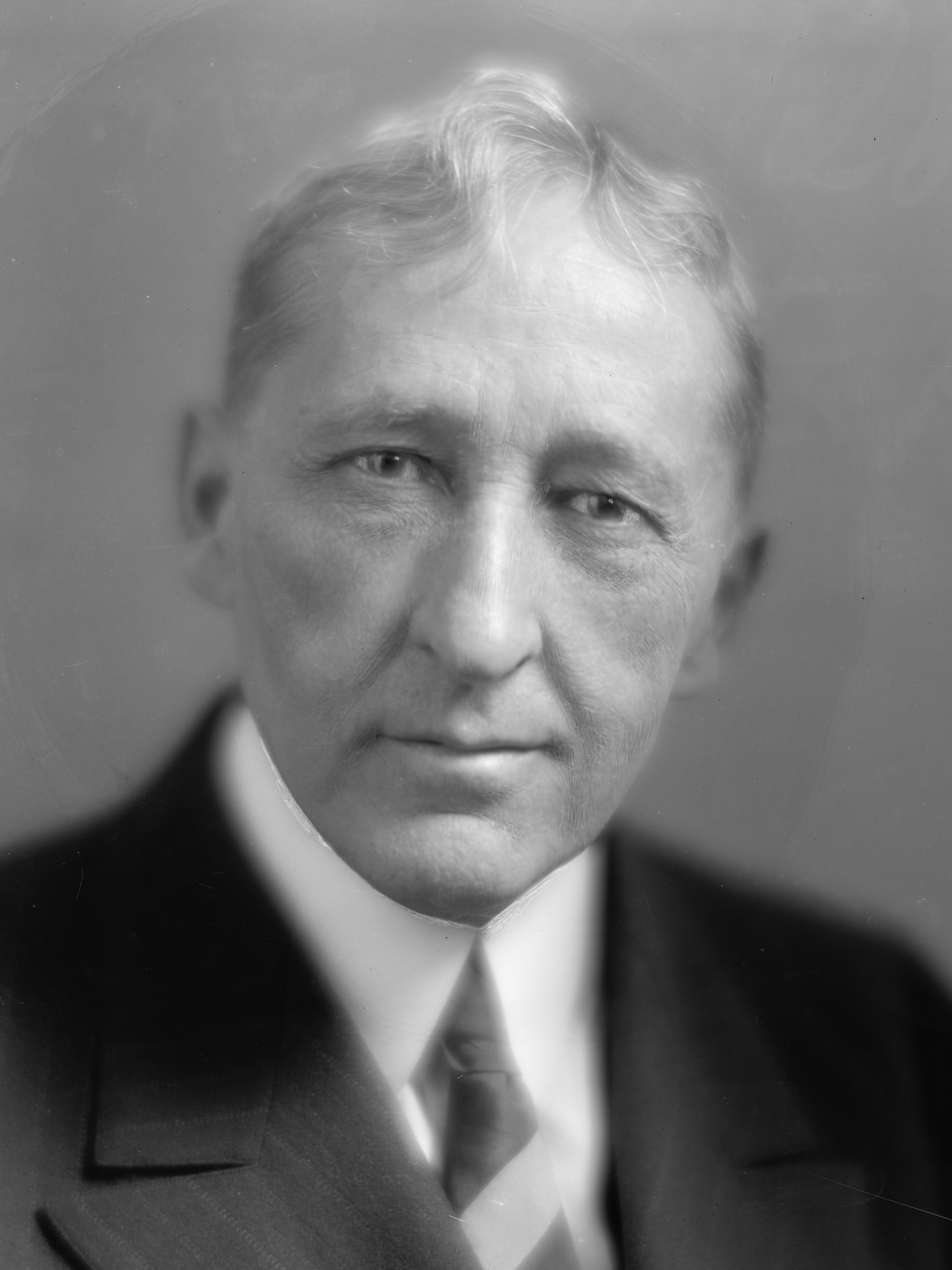

Nominee	William H. King	Ernest Bamberger
Party	Democratic	Republican
Popular vote	97,436	77,073
Percentage	55.52%	43.91%
- County results King: 50–60% 60–70% Bamberger: 50–60% 60–70% 70–80%
U.S. senator before election
William H. King
Democratic
Elected U.S. Senator
William H. King
Democratic

1928 United States Senate election in Utah
Party	Candidate	Votes	%
Democratic	William H. King (Incumbent)	97,436	55.52%
Republican	Ernest Bamberger	77,073	43.91%
Socialist	Charles T. Stoney	998	0.57%
Majority		20,363	11.61%
Turnout		175,507	
Democratic hold			

== Vermont ==
1928 United States Senate election in Vermont
- November 6, 1928
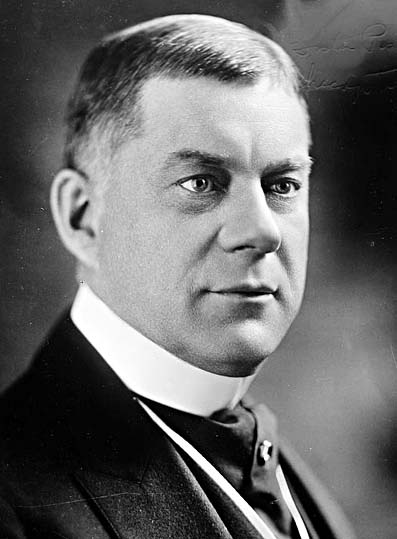

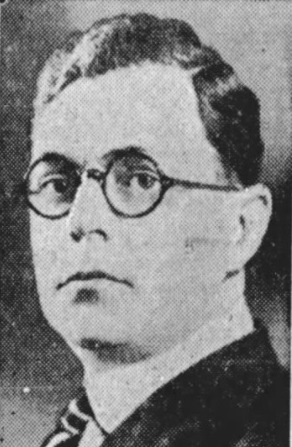
Nominee	Frank L. Greene	Fred C. Martin
Party	Republican	Democratic
Popular vote	93,136	37,030
Percentage	71.55%	28.45%
- Greene: 50–60% 60–70% 70–80% 80–90% 90–100% Martin: 50–60% 60–70% 80–90%
U.S. senator before election
Frank L. Greene
Republican
Elected U.S. Senator
Frank L. Greene
Republican

1928 United States Senate election in Vermont
Party	Candidate	Votes	%
Republican	Frank L. Greene (Incumbent)	93,136	71.55%
Democratic	Fred C. Martin	37,030	28.45%
Majority		56,106	43.10%
Turnout		130,166	
Republican hold			

== Virginia ==
1928 United States Senate election in Virginia
- November 6, 1928
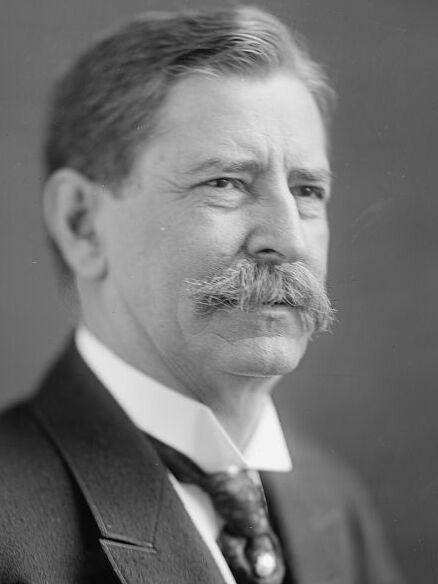
Nominee	Claude A. Swanson
Party	Democratic
Popular vote	275,425
Percentage	99.84%
U.S. senator before election
Claude A. Swanson
Democratic
Elected U.S. Senator
Claude A. Swanson
Democratic

1928 United States Senate election in Virginia
Party	Candidate	Votes	%	±%
Democratic	Claude A. Swanson (inc.)	275,425	99.84%	+27.96%
Write-ins		436	0.16%	+0.16%
Majority		274,989	99.68%	+54.29%
Turnout		275,861		
Democratic hold				

== Washington ==
1928 United States Senate election in Washington
- November 6, 1928
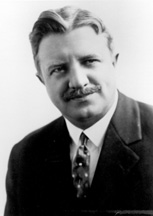

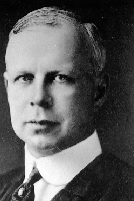
Nominee	Clarence Dill	Kenneth Mackintosh
Party	Democratic	Republican
Popular vote	261,524	227,415
Percentage	53.42%	46.45%
- County results Dill: 50–60% 60–70% 70–80% Mackintosh: 50–60%
U.S. senator before election
Clarence Dill
Democratic
Elected U.S. Senator
Clarence Dill
Democratic

1928 United States Senate election in Washington
Party	Candidate	Votes	%
Democratic	Clarence Dill (Incumbent)	261,524	53.42%
Republican	Kenneth Mackintosh	227,415	46.45%
Workers (Communist)	Alex Noral	666	0.14%
Majority		34,109	6.97%
Turnout		489,605	
Democratic hold			

== West Virginia ==
1928 United States Senate election in West Virginia
- November 6, 1928
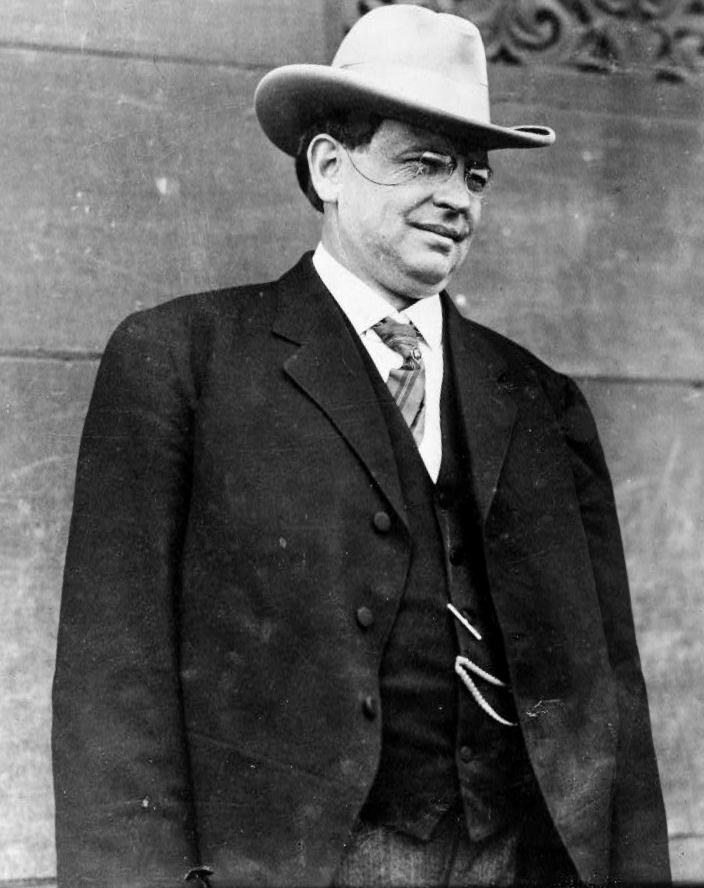

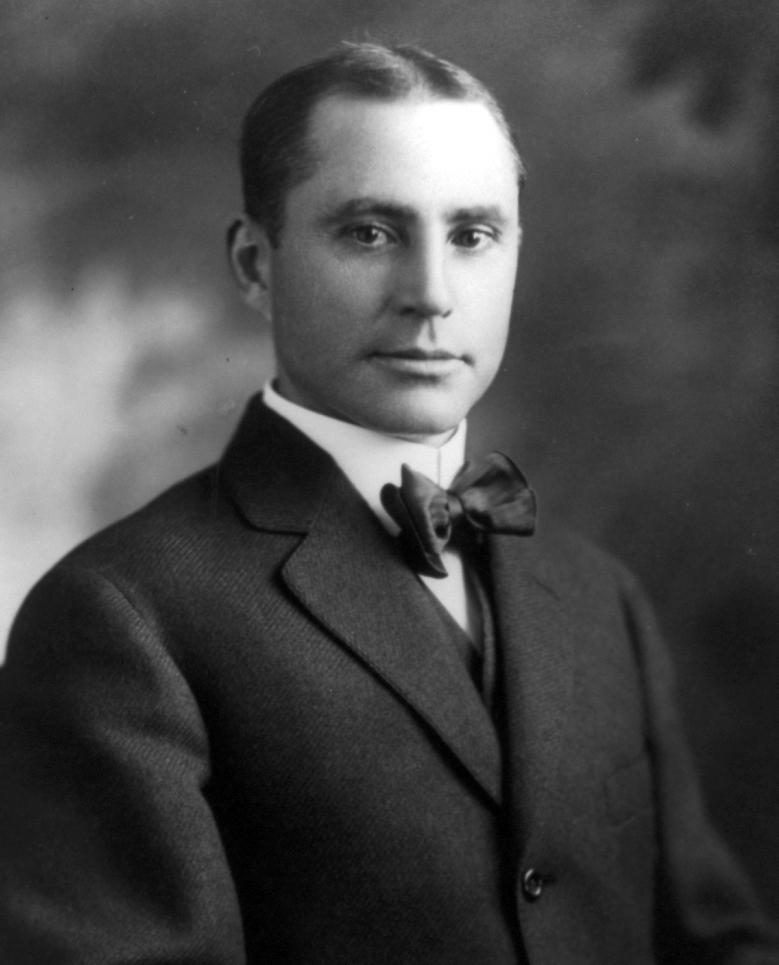
Nominee	Henry D. Hatfield	Matthew M. Neely
Party	Republican	Democratic
Popular vote	327,266	317,620
Percentage	50.68%	49.18%
- County results Hatfield: 50–60% 60–70% 70–80% Neely: 50–60% 60–70%
U.S. senator before election
Matthew M. Neely
Democratic
Elected U.S. Senator
Henry D. Hatfield
Republican

1928 United States Senate election in West Virginia
Party	Candidate	Votes	%
Republican	Henry D. Hatfield	327,266	50.68%
Democratic	Matthew M. Neely (Incumbent)	317,620	49.18%
Socialist	M. S. Holt	919	0.14%
Majority		9,646	1.50%
Turnout		645,805	
Republican gain from Democratic			

== Wisconsin ==
1928 United States Senate election in Wisconsin
- November 6, 1928
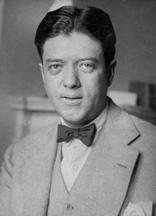

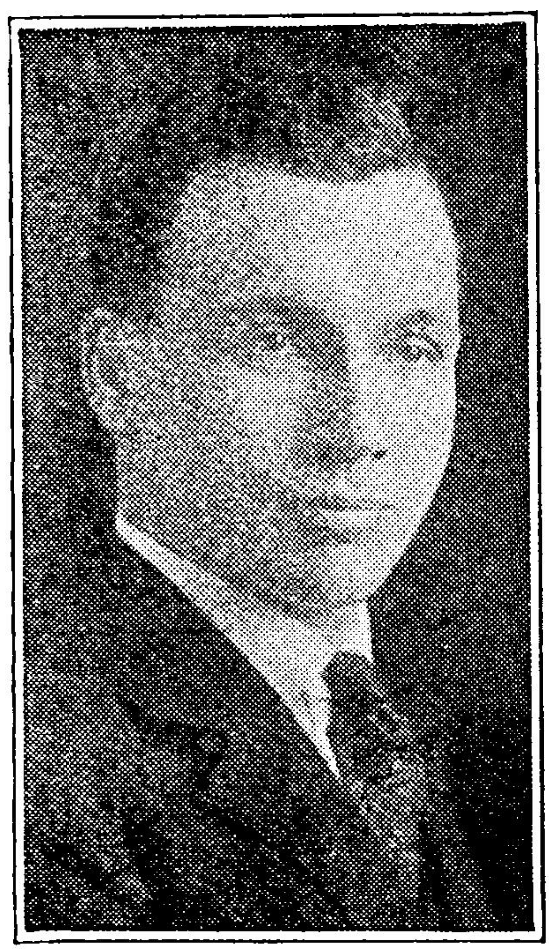
Nominee	Robert La Follette Jr.	William H. Markham
Party	Republican	Independent Republican
Popular vote	635,376	81,302
Percentage	85.57%	10.92%
- La Follete: 70–80% 80–90% >90%
U.S. senator before election
Robert La Follette Jr.
Republican
Elected U.S. Senator
Robert La Follette Jr.
Republican

1928 United States Senate election in Wisconsin
Party	Candidate	Votes	%
Republican	Robert M. La Follette Jr. (incumbent)	635,379	85.56%
Independent Republican	William H. Markham	81,302	10.95%
Prohibition	David W. Emerson	21,359	2.88%
Independent Labor	Richard Koeppel	3,053	0.41%
Workers	John Kasun	1,463	0.20%
None	Scattering	92	0.01%
Majority		54,077	74.61%
Turnout		742,648	
Republican hold			

== Wyoming ==
1928 United States Senate election in Wyoming
- November 6, 1928
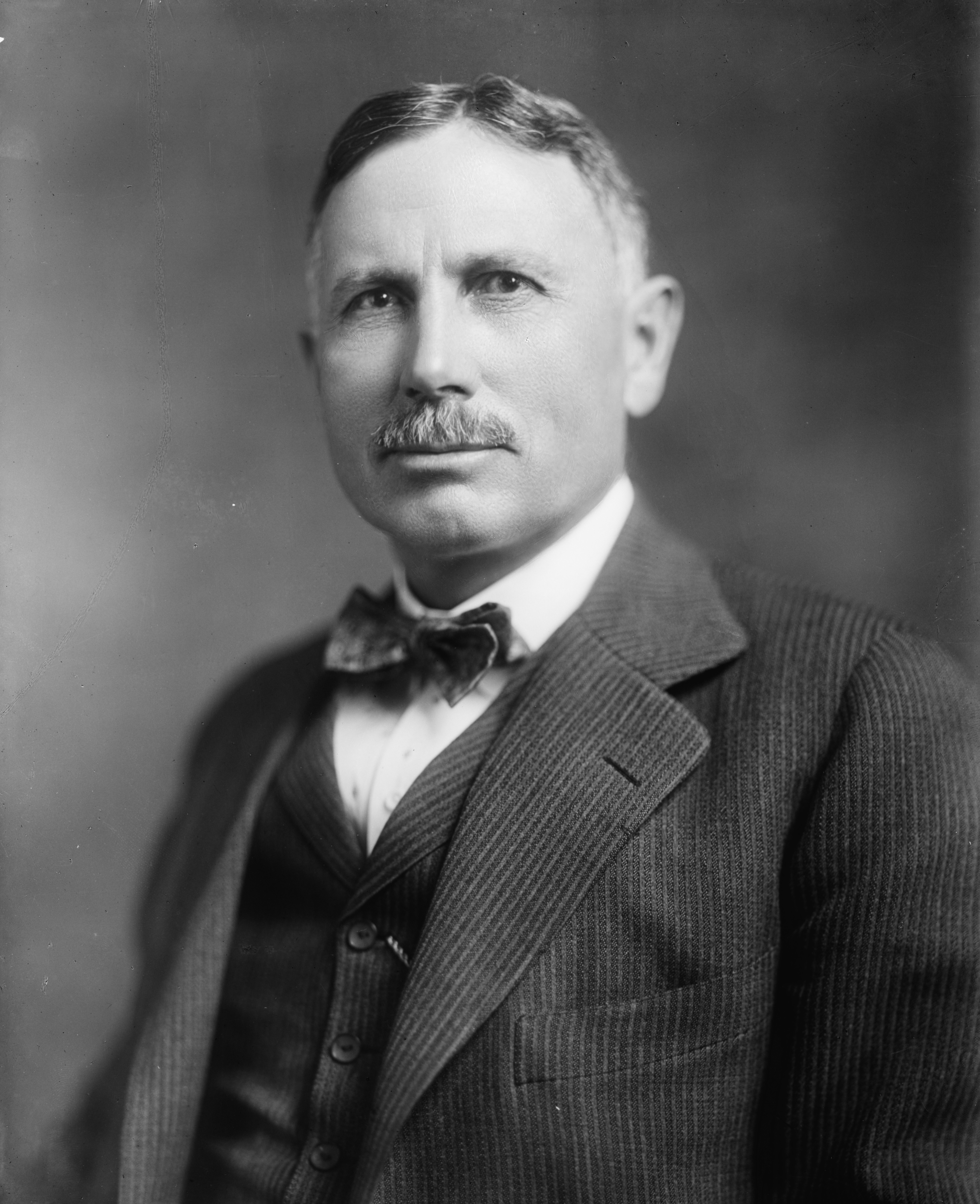

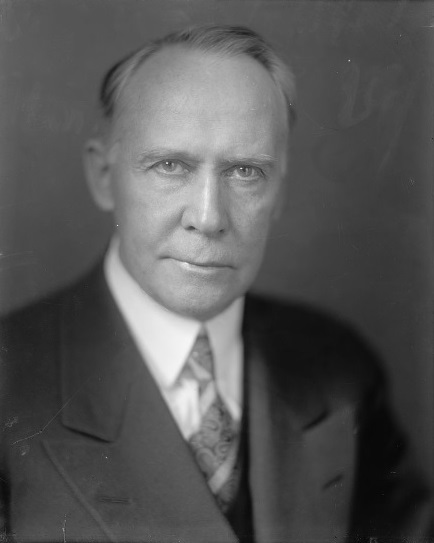
Nominee	John B. Kendrick	Charles E. Winter
Party	Democratic	Republican
Popular vote	43,032	37,076
Percentage	53.50%	46.09%
- County results Kendrick: 40–50% 50–60% 60–70% 70–80% Winter: 50–60% 60–70%
U.S. senator before election
John B. Kendrick
Democratic
Elected U.S. Senator
John B. Kendrick
Democratic

1928 United States Senate election in Wyoming
Party	Candidate	Votes	%
Democratic	John B. Kendrick (Incumbent)	43,032	53.50%
Republican	Charles E. Winter	37,076	46.09%
Socialist	W. W. Wolfe	333	0.41%
Majority		5,956	7.41%
Turnout		80,441	
Democratic hold			

== See also ==
- 1928 United States elections
  - 1928 United States presidential election
  - 1928 United States House of Representatives elections
- 70th United States Congress
- 71st United States Congress
