= List of members of the United States Congress who died in office (1900–1949) =

The following is a list of United States senators and representatives who died of natural and accidental causes, due to illnesses, and by suicide, while they were serving their terms between 1900 and 1949. For a list of members of Congress who were murdered while they were in office during that same time (with the exception of Congressman Pinckney, as he is listed below), see List of members of the United States Congress killed or wounded in office.

Party colors: Democratic (D) Republican (R) Progressive (P) Unionist (U) Socialist (S)

== 1900s ==
Member	Party	State (district)	Date of death	Age at death (years)	Cause	Place of death	Place of burial	Successor	Serving since (in the House/Senate)	Date of birth	Place of birth	U.S. Congress
Charles A. Chickering	Republican	New York (24th district)	February 13, 1900	56	Fell from window	New York City, New York	Riverside Cemetery, Copenhagen, New York	Albert D. Shaw	March 4, 1893	November 26, 1843	Harrisburg, New York	56th (1899–1901)
Sidney Parham Epes	Democratic	Virginia (4th district)	March 3, 1900	34	Peritonitis	Washington, D.C.	Lake View Cemetery, Blackstone, Virginia	Francis R. Lassiter	March 4, 1899 (previously served March 4, 1897 – March 23, 1898)	August 20, 1865	Nottoway Court House, Virginia	56th (1899–1901)
Alfred C. Harmer	Republican	Pennsylvania (5th district)	March 6, 1900	74	Kidney Disease	Philadelphia, Pennsylvania	West Laurel Hill Cemetery, Bala Cynwyd, Pennsylvania	Edward de Veaux Morrell	March 4, 1877 (previously served March 4, 1871 – March 3, 1875)	August 8, 1825	Philadelphia, Pennsylvania	56th (1899–1901)
John H. Hoffecker	Republican	Delaware (at-large)	June 16, 1900	72	Stroke	Smyrna, Delaware	Glenwood Cemetery, Smyrna, Delaware	Walter O. Hoffecker	March 4, 1899	September 12, 1827	Smyrna, Delaware	56th (1899–1901)
John H. Gear	Republican	Iowa (Senator)	July 14, 1900	75	Heart Attack	Washington, D.C.	Aspen Grove Cemetery, Burlington, Iowa	Jonathan P. Dolliver	March 4, 1895 (U.S. House tenure March 4, 1887 – March 3, 1891 and March 4, 1893 – March 3, 1895)	April 7, 1825	Ithaca, New York	56th (1899–1901)
William Davis Daly	Democratic	New Jersey (7th district)	July 31, 1900	49	Nephritis	Hoboken, New Jersey	Bayview Cemetery, Jersey City, New Jersey	Allan Langdon McDermott	March 4, 1899	June 4, 1851	Jersey City, New Jersey	56th (1899–1901)
Cushman Kellogg Davis	Republican	Minnesota (Senator)	November 27, 1900	62	Diabetes, nephritis, kidney failure	Saint Paul, Minnesota	Arlington National Cemetery, Arlington, Virginia	Charles A. Towne	March 4, 1887	June 16, 1838	Henderson, New York	56th (1899–1901)
Richard Alsop Wise	Republican	Virginia (2nd district)	December 21, 1900	57	Nephritis	Williamsburg, Virginia	Hollywood Cemetery, Richmond, Virginia	Harry L. Maynard	March 12, 1900 (previously served April 26, 1898 – March 3, 1899)	September 2, 1843	Philadelphia, Pennsylvania	56th (1899–1901)
Frank G. Clarke	Republican	New Hampshire (2nd district)	January 9, 1901	50	Aneurysm	Peterborough, New Hampshire	Pine Hill Cemetery, Peterborough, New Hampshire	Frank D. Currier	March 4, 1897	September 10, 1850	Wilton, New Hampshire	56th (1899–1901)
Albert D. Shaw	Republican	New York (24th district)	February 10, 1901	59	Apoplexy	Washington, D.C.	Brookside Cemetery, Watertown, New York	Charles L. Knapp	November 6, 1900	December 21, 1841	Lyme, New York	56th (1899–1901)
Marriott Henry Brosius	Republican	Pennsylvania (10th district)	March 16, 1901	58	Apoplexy	Lancaster, Pennsylvania	Green-Wood Cemetery, Brooklyn, New York	Henry B. Cassel	March 4, 1889	March 7, 1843	Colerain Township, Pennsylvania	57th (1901–1903)
Rousseau Owen Crump	Republican	Michigan (10th district)	May 1, 1901	57	Heart failure	West Bay City, Michigan	Elm Lawn Cemetery, Bay City, Michigan	Henry H. Alpin	March 4, 1895	May 20, 1843	Pittsfield, New York	57th (1901–1903)
Robert E. Burke	Democratic	Texas (6th district)	June 5, 1901	53	Paralysis	Dallas, Texas	Greenwood Cemetery, Dallas, Texas	Dudley Goodall Wooten	March 4, 1897	August 1, 1847	Dadeville, Alabama	57th (1901–1903)
James H. Kyle	Republican	South Dakota (Senator)	July 1, 1901	47	Heart failure, malaria	Aberdeen, South Dakota	U.S.	Alfred B. Kittredge	March 4, 1891	February 24, 1854	Cedarville, Ohio	57th (1901–1903)
J. William Stokes	Democratic	South Carolina (7th district)	July 6, 1901	47	Died after a long illness	Orangeburg, South Carolina	Sunnyside Cemetery, Orangeburg, South Carolina	Himself	November 3, 1896 (previously served March 4, 1895 – June 1, 1896)	December 12, 1853	Orangeburg, South Carolina	57th (1901–1903)
William Joyce Sewell	Republican	New Jersey (Senator)	December 27, 1901	66	Heart disease, diabetes	Camden, New Jersey	Harleigh Cemetery, Camden, New Jersey	John F. Dryden	March 4, 1895 (previously served March 4, 1881 – March 3, 1887)	December 6, 1835	Castlebar, County Mayo, Ireland, U.K.	57th (1901–1903)
Rufus King Polk	Democratic	Pennsylvania (17th district)	March 5, 1902	35	Paralysis	Philadelphia, Pennsylvania	Fairview Cemetery, Danville, Pennsylvania	Alexander Billmeyer	March 4, 1899	August 23, 1866	Columbia, Tennessee	57th (1901–1903)
Amos J. Cummings	Democratic	New York (10th district)	May 2, 1902	60	Pneumonia caused by surgery complications	Baltimore, Maryland	Clinton Cemetery, Irvington, New Jersey	Edward Swann	November 5, 1895 (previously served March 4, 1887 – March 3, 1889 and November 5, 1889 – November 21, 1894)	May 15, 1841	Conklin, New York	57th (1901–1903)
Peter J. Otey	Democratic	Virginia (6th district)	May 4, 1902	61	Heart disease, diabetes	Lynchburg, Virginia	Presbyterian Cemetery, Lynchburg, Virginia	Carter Glass	March 4, 1895	December 22, 1840	Lynchburg, Virginia	57th (1901–1903)
Joshua S. Salmon	Democratic	New Jersey (4th district)	May 6, 1902	56	Apoplexy	Boonton, New Jersey	Greenwood Cemetery, Boonton, New Jersey	De Witt C. Flanagan	March 4, 1899	February 2, 1846	Mount Olive Township, New Jersey	57th (1901–1903)
James McMillan	Republican	Michigan (Senator)	August 10, 1902	64	Heart failure	Manchester, Massachusetts	Elmwood Cemetery, Detroit, Michigan	Russell A. Alger	March 4, 1889	May 12, 1838	Hamilton, Ontario, Canada	57th (1901–1903)
Reese C. De Graffenreid	Democratic	Texas (3rd district)	August 29, 1902	43	Apoplexy	Washington, D.C.	Greenwood Cemetery, Longview, Texas	Gordon J. Russell	March 4, 1897	May 7, 1859	Franklin, Tennessee	57th (1901–1903)
John Levi Sheppard	Democratic	Texas (4th district)	October 11, 1902	50	Unspecified illness	Texarkana, Texas	Rose Hill Cemetery, Texarkana, Texas	Morris Sheppard	March 4, 1899	April 13, 1852	Bluffton, Alabama	57th (1901–1903)
Charles Addison Russell	Republican	Connecticut (3rd district)	October 23, 1902	50	Influenza	Killingly, Connecticut	High Street Cemetery, Killingly, Connecticut	Frank B. Brandegee	March 4, 1887	March 2, 1852	Worcester, Massachusetts	57th (1901–1903)
Thomas H. Tongue	Republican	Oregon (1st district)	January 11, 1903	58	Heart failure	Washington, D.C.	Hillsboro Pioneer Cemetery, Hillsboro, Oregon	Binger Hermann	March 4, 1897	June 23, 1844	Lincolnshire, England, U.K.	57th (1901–1903)
John N. W. Rumple	Republican	Iowa (2nd district)	January 31, 1903	61	Throat cancer	Chicago, Illinois	Odd Fellows Cemetery, Marengo, Iowa	Martin J. Wade	March 4, 1901	March 4, 1841	Fostoria, Ohio	57th (1901–1903)
James M. Moody	Republican	North Carolina (9th district)	February 5, 1903	44	Unspecified respiratory illness	Waynesville, North Carolina	Green Hill Cemetery, Waynesville, North Carolina	Edwin Y. Webb	March 4, 1901	February 12, 1858	Robbinsville, North Carolina	57th (1901–1903)
Robert H. Foerderer	Republican	Pennsylvania (4th district)	July 26, 1903	43	Unspecified illness	Torresdale, Philadelphia, Pennsylvania	Laurel Hill Cemetery, Philadelphia, Pennsylvania	Reuben O. Moon	March 4, 1901	May 16, 1860	Frankenhausen, Schwarzburg-Rudolstadt, Germany	58th (1903–1905)
Vincent Boreing	Republican	Kentucky (11th district)	September 16, 1903	63	Pneumonia	London, Kentucky	Pine Grove Cemetery, London, Kentucky	W. Godfrey Hunter	March 4, 1899	November 24, 1839	Washington County, Tennessee	58th (1903–1905)
Henry Burk	Republican	Pennsylvania (3rd district)	December 5, 1903	53	"Affection of the heart, complicated by other ailments"	Philadelphia, Pennsylvania	Holy Sepulchre Cemetery, Cheltenham Township, Pennsylvania	George A. Castor	March 4, 1901	September 26, 1850	Württemberg, Germany	58th (1903–1905)
William W. Skiles	Republican	Ohio (14th district)	January 9, 1904	54	Pneumonia	Shelby, Ohio	Oakland Cemetery, Shelby, Ohio	Amos R. Webber	March 4, 1901	December 11, 1849	Stoughstown, Cumberland County, Pennsylvania	58th (1903–1905)
Mark Hanna	Republican	Ohio (Senator)	February 15, 1904	66	Typhoid fever	Washington, D.C.	Lake View Cemetery, Cleveland, Ohio	Charles W. F. Dick	March 4, 1897	September 24, 1837	New Lisbon, Ohio	58th (1903–1905)
George W. Croft	Democratic	South Carolina (2nd district)	March 10, 1904	57	Complications from splinter infection	Washington, D.C.	St. Thaddeus Episcopal Churchyard, Aiken, South Carolina	Theodore G. Croft	March 4, 1903	December 20, 1846	Newberry County, South Carolina	58th (1903–1905)
Charles Winston Thompson	Democratic	Alabama (5th district)	March 20, 1904	43	Pneumonia	Washington, D.C.	U.S.	James Thomas Heflin	March 4, 1901	December 30, 1860	Tuskegee, Alabama	58th (1903–1905)
Matthew Quay	Republican	Pennsylvania (Senator)	May 28, 1904	70	Chronic gastritis	Beaver, Pennsylvania	Beaver Cemetery, Beaver, Pennsylvania	Philander Knox	January 16, 1901 (previously served March 4, 1887 - March 3, 1899)	September 30, 1833	Dillsburg, Pennsylvania	58th (1903–1905)
George Frisbie Hoar	Republican	Massachusetts (Senator)	September 30, 1904	78	Arteriosclerosis, heart disease, kidney disease	Worcester, Massachusetts	Sleepy Hollow Cemetery, Concord, Massachusetts	Winthrop M. Crane	March 4, 1877 (U.S. House tenure March 4, 1869 – March 3, 1877)	August 29, 1826	Concord, Massachusetts	58th (1903–1905)
William F. Mahoney	Democratic	Illinois (8th district)	December 27, 1904	48	Kidney disease	Chicago, Illinois	Calvary Cemetery, Evanston, Illinois	Charles McGavin	March 4, 1901	February 22, 1856	Chicago, Illinois	58th (1903–1905)
Norton P. Otis	Republican	New York (19th district)	February 20, 1905	64	Unspecified cancer	Westchester County, New York	Oakland Cemetery, Yonkers, New York	John Emory Andrus	March 4, 1903	March 18, 1840	Halifax, Vermont	58th (1903–1905)
William B. Bate	Democratic	Tennessee (Senator)	March 9, 1905	78	Pneumonia	Washington, D.C.	Mount Olivet Cemetery, Nashville, Tennessee	James B. Frazier	March 4, 1887	October 7, 1826	Castalian Springs, Tennessee	59th (1905–1907)
Orville H. Platt	Republican	Connecticut (Senator)	April 21, 1905	77	Pneumonia	Meriden, Connecticut	Cemetery on the Green, Washington, Connecticut	Frank B. Brandegee	March 4, 1879	July 19, 1827	Washington, Connecticut	59th (1905–1907)
John M. Pinckney	Democratic	Texas (8th district)	April 24, 1905	59	Shooting assassination	Hempstead, Texas	Hempstead City Cemetery, Hempstead, Texas	John M. Moore	November 17, 1903	May 4, 1845	Grimes County (now Waller County), Texas	59th (1905–1907)
Benjamin F. Marsh	Republican	Illinois (14th district)	June 2, 1905	69	Pneumonia	Warsaw, Illinois	Oakland Cemetery, Warsaw, Illinois	James McKinney	March 4, 1903 (previously served March 4, 1877 – March 3, 1883 and March 4, 1893 – March 3, 1901)	November 19, 1835	Warsaw, Illinois	59th (1905–1907)
John H. Mitchell	Republican	Oregon (Senator)	December 8, 1905	70	Dental complicatons	Portland, Oregon	River View Cemetery, Portland, Oregon	John M. Gearin	March 4, 1901 (previously served March 4, 1873 – March 3, 1879 and November 18, 1885 – March 3, 1897)	June 22, 1835	Washington County, Pennsylvania	59th (1905–1907)
George A. Castor	Republican	Pennsylvania (3rd district)	February 19, 1906	50	Hemorrhagic stroke	Philadelphia, Pennsylvania	Emmanuel Resurrection Episcopal Church Cemetery, Holmesburg, Pennsylvania	J. Hampton Moore	February 16, 1904	August 6, 1855	Holmesburg, Pennsylvania	59th (1905–1907)
George Robert Patterson	Republican	Pennsylvania (12th district)	March 21, 1906	42	Heart disease	Washington, D.C.	Citizens Cemetery, Ashland, Pennsylvania	Charles N. Brumm	March 4, 1901	November 9, 1863	Lewistown, Pennsylvania	59th (1905–1907)
Robert Adams Jr.	Republican	Pennsylvania (2nd district)	June 1, 1906	57	Self-inflicted gunshot wound	Washington, D.C.	Laurel Hill Cemetery, Philadelphia, Pennsylvania	John Reyburn	December 19, 1893	February 26, 1849	Philadelphia, Pennsylvania	59th (1905–1907)
Arthur P. Gorman	Democratic	Maryland (Senator)	June 4, 1906	67	Heart attack	Washington, D.C.	Oak Hill Cemetery, Washington, D.C.	William P. Whyte	March 4, 1903 (previously served March 4, 1881 – March 3, 1899)	March 11, 1839	Woodstock, Maryland	59th (1905–1907)
Rufus E. Lester	Democratic	Georgia (1st district)	June 16, 1906	68	Fell through skylight	Washington, D.C.	Bonaventure Cemetery, Savannah, Georgia	James W. Overstreet	March 4, 1889	December 12, 1837	Waynesboro, Georgia	59th (1905–1907)
Henry Cullen Adams	Republican	Wisconsin (2nd district)	July 9, 1906	55	Unspecified intestinal illness	Chicago, Illinois	Forest Hill Cemetery, Madison, Wisconsin	John M. Nelson	March 4, 1903	November 28, 1850	Verona, New York	59th (1905–1907)
Robert R. Hitt	Republican	Illinois (13th district)	September 20, 1906	72	Heart disease	Narragansett Pier, Rhode Island	Oakwood Cemetery, Mount Morris, Illinois	Frank O. Lowden	December 4, 1882	January 16, 1834	Urbana, Ohio	59th (1905–1907)
Rockwood Hoar	Republican	Massachusetts (3rd district)	November 1, 1906	51	Brain cancer	Worcester, Massachusetts	Rural Cemetery, Worcester, Massachusetts	Charles G. Washburn	March 4, 1905	October 24, 1855	Worcester, Massachusetts	59th (1905–1907)
John H. Ketcham	Republican	New York (21st district)	November 4, 1906	73	Apoplexy	New York City, New York	Valley View Cemetery, Dover Plains, New York	Samuel McMillan	March 4, 1897 (previously served March 4, 1865 – March 3, 1873 and March 4, 1877 – March 3, 1893)	December 21, 1832	Dover Plains, New York	59th (1905–1907)
Russell A. Alger	Republican	Michigan (Senator)	January 24, 1907	70	Pulmonary edema	Washington, D.C.	Elmwood Cemetery, Detroit, Michigan	William A. Smith	September 27, 1902	February 27, 1836	Lafayette Township, Medina County, Ohio	59th (1905–1907)
William H. Flack	Republican	New York (26th district)	February 2, 1907	45	Unspecified prolonged illness	Malone, New York	Morningside Cemetery, Malone, New York	George R. Malby	March 4, 1903	March 22, 1861	Franklin Falls, New York	59th (1905–1907)
John Franklin Rixey	Democratic	Virginia (8th district)	February 8, 1907	52	Tuberculosis	Washington, D.C.	Fairview Cemetery, Culpeper, Virginia	Charles C. Carlin	March 4, 1897	August 1, 1854	Culpeper County, Virginia	59th (1905–1907)
John T. Morgan	Democratic	Alabama (Senator)	June 11, 1907	82	Heart attack	Washington, D.C.	Live Oak Cemetery, Selma, Alabama	John H. Bankhead	March 4, 1877	June 20, 1824	Athens, Tennessee	60th (1907–1909)
Edmund Pettus	Democratic	Alabama (Senator)	July 27, 1907	86	Apoplexy	Hot Springs, North Carolina	Live Oak Cemetery, Selma, Alabama	Joseph F. Johnston	March 4, 1897	July 6, 1821	Athens, Alabama	60th (1907–1909)
Campbell Slemp	Republican	Virginia (9th district)	October 13, 1907	67	Coronary heart disease	Big Stone Gap, Virginia	Family cemetery, Lee County, Virginia	C. Bascom Slemp	March 4, 1903	December 2, 1839	Turkey Cove, Virginia	60th (1907–1909)
George W. Smith	Republican	Illinois (25th district)	November 30, 1907	61	Typhoid fever, malaria	Murphysboro, Illinois	City Cemetery, Murphysboro, Illinois	Napoleon B. Thistlewood	March 4, 1889	August 18, 1846	Putnam County, Ohio	60th (1907–1909)
Stephen R. Mallory, Jr.	Democratic	Florida (Senator)	December 23, 1907	59	Unspecified prolonged illness	Pensacola, Florida	St. Michael's Cemetery, Pensacola, Florida	William J. Bryan	May 15, 1897 (U.S. House tenure March 4, 1891 – March 3, 1895)	November 2, 1848	Columbia, South Carolina	60th (1907–1909)
Asbury Latimer	Democratic	South Carolina (Senator)	February 20, 1908	56	Peritonitis caused by surgery complications	Washington, D.C.	Belton Cemetery, Belton, South Carolina	Frank B. Gary	March 4, 1903 (U.S. House tenure March 4, 1893 – March 3, 1903)	July 31, 1851	Lowndesville, South Carolina	60th (1907–1909)
Redfield Proctor	Republican	Vermont (Senator)	March 4, 1908	76	Pneumonia, heart failure	Washington, D.C.	South Street Cemetery, Proctor, Vermont	John W. Stewart	November 2, 1891	June 1, 1831	Proctorsville, Vermont	60th (1907–1909)
Adolph Meyer	Democratic	Louisiana (1st district)	March 8, 1908	65	Heart failure after long illness	New Orleans, Louisiana	Metairie Cemetery, New Orleans, Louisiana	Albert Estopinal	March 4, 1891	October 19, 1842	Natchez, Mississippi	60th (1907–1909)
William P. Whyte	Democratic	Maryland (Senator)	March 17, 1908	83	Erysipelas	Baltimore, Maryland	Green Mount Cemetery, Baltimore, Maryland	John W. Smith	June 8, 1906 (previously served July 13, 1868 – March 3, 1869 and March 4, 1875 – March 3, 1881)	August 9, 1824	Baltimore, Maryland	60th (1907–1909)
William J. Bryan	Democratic	Florida (Senator)	March 22, 1908	31	Typhoid fever	Washington, D.C.	Evergreen Cemetery, Jacksonville, Florida	William H. Milton	December 26, 1907	October 10, 1876	Orange County (now Lake County), Florida	60th (1907–1909)
Abraham L. Brick	Republican	Indiana (13th district)	April 7, 1908	47	Nephritis	Indianapolis, Indiana	Riverview Cemetery, South Bend, Indiana	Henry A. Barnhart	March 4, 1899	May 27, 1860	South Bend, Indiana	60th (1907–1909)
Charles T. Dunwell	Republican	New York (3rd district)	June 12, 1908	56	Nephritis	Brooklyn, New York	Cemetery of the Evergreens, Brooklyn, New York	Otto G. Foelker	March 4, 1903	February 13, 1852	Newark, New York	60th (1907–1909)
Ariosto A. Wiley	Democratic	Alabama (2nd district)	June 17, 1908	59	Rheumatoid arthritis	Hot Springs, Virginia	Oakwood Cemetery, Montgomery, Alabama	Oliver C. Wiley	March 4, 1901	November 6, 1848	Clayton, Alabama	60th (1907–1909)
William H. Parker	Republican	South Dakota (at-large)	June 26, 1908	61	Hepatic cirrhosis	Deadwood, South Dakota	Arlington National Cemetery, Arlington, Virginia	Eben Martin	March 4, 1907	May 5, 1847	Keene, New Hampshire	60th (1907–1909)
Llewellyn Powers	Republican	Maine (4th district)	July 28, 1908	71	Valvular heart disease, nephritis	Houlton, Maine	West Pittsfield Cemetery, Pittsfield, Maine	Frank E. Guernsey	April 8, 1901 (previously served March 4, 1877 – March 3, 1879)	October 14, 1836	Pittsfield, Maine	60th (1907–1909)
William B. Allison	Republican	Iowa (Senator)	August 4, 1908	79	Heart disease	Dubuque, Iowa	Linwood Cemetery, Dubuque, Iowa	Albert B. Cummins	March 4, 1873 (U.S. House tenure March 4, 1863 – March 3, 1871)	March 2, 1829	Perry, Ohio	60th (1907–1909)
Robert C. Davey	Democratic	Louisiana (2nd district)	December 26, 1908	55	Apoplexy	New Orleans, Louisiana	Metairie Cemetery, New Orleans, Louisiana	Samuel L. Gilmore	March 4, 1897 (previously served March 4, 1893 – March 3, 1895)	October 22, 1853	New Orleans, Louisiana	60th (1907–1909)
Daniel L. D. Granger	Democratic	Rhode Island (1st district)	February 14, 1909	56	Heart failure	Washington, D.C.	Swan Point Cemetery, Providence, Rhode Island	William P. Sheffield, Jr.	March 4, 1903	May 30, 1852	Providence, Rhode Island	60th (1907–1909)
Francis W. Cushman	Republican	Washington (at-large)	July 6, 1909	42	Pneumonia	New York City, New York	Tacoma Cemetery, Tacoma, Washington	N/A	March 4, 1899	May 8, 1867	Brighton, Iowa	61st (1909–1911)
Martin N. Johnson	Republican	North Dakota (Senator)	October 21, 1909	59	Nephritis	Fargo, North Dakota	City Cemetery, Petersburg, North Dakota	Fountain L. Thompson	March 4, 1909 (U.S. House tenure March 4, 1891 – March 3, 1899)	March 3, 1850	Racine County, Wisconsin	61st (1909–1911)
Francis R. Lassiter	Democratic	Virginia (4th district)	October 31, 1909	43	Heart failure	Petersburg, Virginia	Blanford Cemetery, Petersburg, Virginia	Robert Turnbull	March 4, 1907 (previously served April 19, 1900 – March 3, 1903)	February 18, 1866	Petersburg, Virginia	61st (1909–1911)
David A. De Armond	Democratic	Missouri (6th district)	November 23, 1909	65	House fire	Butler, Missouri	Oak Hill Cemetery, Butler, Missouri	Clement C. Dickinson	March 4, 1891	March 18, 1844	Blair County, Pennsylvania	61st (1909–1911)
Anselm J. McLaurin	Democratic	Mississippi (Senator)	December 22, 1909	61	Heart disease	Brandon, Mississippi	Brandon, Mississippi	James Gordon	March 4, 1901 (previously served February 7, 1894 – March 3, 1895)	March 26, 1848	Brandon, Mississippi	61st (1909–1911)

== 1910s ==
Member	Party	State (district)	Date of death	Age at death (years)	Cause	Place of death	Place of burial	Successor	Serving since (in the House/Senate)	Date of birth	Place of birth	U.S. Congress
James M. Griggs	Democratic	Georgia (2nd district)	January 5, 1910	48	Heart failure	Dawson, Georgia	Cedar Hill Cemetery, Dawson, Georgia	Seaborn Roddenberry	March 4, 1897	March 29, 1861	Lagrange, Georgia	61st (1909–1911)
William C. Lovering	Republican	Massachusetts (14th district)	February 4, 1910	74	Pneumonia	Washington, D.C.	Mount Pleasant Cemetery, Taunton, Massachusetts	Eugene Foss	March 4, 1897	February 25, 1835	Woonsocket, Rhode Island	61st (1909–1911)
James Breck Perkins	Republican	New York (32nd district)	March 11, 1910	62	Unspecified intestinal illness	Washington, D.C.	Mount Hope Cemetery (Rochester), Rochester, New York	James S. Havens	March 4, 1901	November 4, 1847	St. Croix Falls, Wisconsin	61st (1909–1911)
Samuel D. McEnery	Democratic	Louisiana (Senator)	June 28, 1910	73	Heart failure	New Orleans, Louisiana U.S.	Metairie Cemetery, New Orleans, Louisiana	John Thornton	March 4, 1897	May 28, 1837	Monroe, Louisiana	61st (1909–1911)
John W. Daniel	Democratic	Virginia (Senator)	June 29, 1910	67	Intracerebral hemorrhage	Lynchburg, Virginia U.S.	Spring Hill Cemetery, Lynchburg, Virginia	Claude A. Swanson	March 4, 1887 (U.S. House tenure March 4, 1885 – March 3, 1887)	September 5, 1842	Lynchburg, Virginia	61st (1909–1911)
Walter P. Brownlow	Republican	Tennessee (1st district)	July 8, 1910	59	Nephritis	Johnson City, Tennessee U.S.	Mountain Home National Cemetery, Johnson City, Tennessee	Zachary D. Massey	March 4, 1897	March 27, 1851	Abingdon, Virginia	61st (1909–1911)
Samuel L. Gilmore	Democratic	Louisiana (2nd district)	July 18, 1910	50	Unspecified prolonged illness	Abita Springs, Louisiana	Metairie Cemetery, New Orleans, Louisiana	H. Garland Dupré	March 30, 1909	July 30, 1859	New Orleans, Louisiana	61st (1909–1911)
Charles Q. Tirrell	Republican	Massachusetts (4th district)	July 31, 1910	65	Intracerebral hemorrhage, arteriosclerosis	Natick, Massachusetts	Dell Park Cemetery, Natick, Massachusetts	John Joseph Mitchell	March 4, 1901	December 10, 1844	Sharon, Massachusetts	61st (1909–1911)
Jonathan P. Dolliver	Republican	Iowa (Senator)	October 15, 1910	52	Heart disease	Fort Dodge, Iowa	Oakland Cemetery, Fort Dodge, Iowa	Lafayette Young	August 22, 1900 (U.S. House tenure March 4, 1889 – August 22, 1900)	February 6, 1858	Kingwood, Virginia	61st (1909–1911)
Alexander S. Clay	Democratic	Georgia (Senator)	November 13, 1910	57	Dilated cardiomyopathy	Atlanta, Georgia	City Cemetery, Marietta, Georgia	Joseph M. Terrell	March 4, 1897	September 25, 1853	Powder Springs, Georgia	61st (1909–1911)
William Walker Foulkrod	Republican	Pennsylvania (5th district)	November 13, 1910	63	Myocarditis	Frankford, Philadelphia, Pennsylvania	Cedar Hill Cemetery, Philadelphia, Pennsylvania	Michael Donohoe	March 4, 1907	November 22, 1846	Frankford, Pennsylvania	61st (1909–1911)
Joel Cook	Republican	Pennsylvania (2nd district)	December 15, 1910	68	Cerebral embolism, atheroma	Philadelphia, Pennsylvania	Laurel Hill Cemetery, Philadelphia, Pennsylvania	William S. Reyburn	November 5, 1907	March 20, 1842	Philadelphia, Pennsylvania	61st (1909–1911)
Stephen Benton Elkins	Republican	West Virginia (Senator)	January 4, 1911	69	Sepsis	Washington, D.C.	Maplewood Cemetery, Elkins, West Virginia	Davis Elkins	March 4, 1895 (U.S. House tenure as a delegate March 4, 1873 – March 3, 1877)	September 26, 1841	New Lexington, Ohio	61st (1909–1911)
Charles J. Hughes Jr.	Democratic	Colorado (Senator)	January 11, 1911	57	"General breakdown", goiter, paralysis	Denver, Colorado	Fairmount Cemetery, Denver, Colorado	Charles S. Thomas	March 4, 1909	February 16, 1853	Kingston, Missouri	61st (1909–1911)
Amos L. Allen	Republican	Maine (1st district)	February 20, 1911	73	Pneumonia	Washington, D.C.	Evergreen Cemetery, Alfred, Maine	Asher C. Hinds	November 6, 1899	March 17, 1837	Waterboro, Maine	61st (1909–1911)
Alexander C. Mitchell	Republican	Kansas (2nd district)	July 7, 1911	50	Stomach cancer	Lawrence, Kansas	Oak Hill Cemetery, Lawrence, Kansas	Joseph Taggart	March 4, 1911	October 11, 1860	Cincinnati, Ohio	62nd (1911–1913)
George Washington Kipp	Republican	Pennsylvania (14th district)	July 24, 1911	64	"Acute indigestion"	Vancouver Island, British Columbia, Canada	Oak Hill Cemetery, Towanda, Pennsylvania	William D.B. Ainey	March 4, 1911 (previously served March 4, 1907 – March 3, 1909)	March 28, 1847	Greene Township, Pike County, Pennsylvania	62nd (1911–1913)
William P. Frye	Republican	Maine (Senator)	August 8, 1911	80	"General breakdown"	Lewiston, Maine	Riverside Cemetery, Lewiston, Maine	Obadiah Gardner	March 18, 1881 (U.S. House tenure March 4, 1871 – March 18, 1881)	September 2, 1830	Lewiston, Maine	62nd (1911–1913)
George W. Gordon	Democratic	Tennessee (10th district)	August 9, 1911	74	Unspecified kidney issues	Memphis, Tennessee	Elmwood Cemetery, Memphis, Tennessee	Kenneth McKellar	March 4, 1907	October 5, 1836	Pulaski, Tennessee	62nd (1911–1913)
Henry C. Loudenslager	Republican	New Jersey (1st district)	August 12, 1911	59	Typhoid fever	Paulsboro, New Jersey	Eglington Cemetery, Clarksboro, New Jersey	William J. Browning	March 4, 1893	May 22, 1852	Mauricetown, New Jersey	62nd (1911–1913)
James P. Latta	Democratic	Nebraska (3rd district)	September 11, 1911	66	Unspecified surgery complications	Rochester, Minnesota	Tekamah Cemetery, Rochester, Minnesota	Dan V. Stephens	March 4, 1909	October 31, 1844	Ashland, Ohio	62nd (1911–1913)
Edmond H. Madison	Republican	Kansas (7th district)	September 18, 1911	45	Heart disease	Dodge City, Kansas	Maple Grove Cemetery, Dodge City, Kansas	George Neeley	March 4, 1907	December 18, 1865	Plymouth, Illinois	62nd (1911–1913)
David J. Foster	Republican	Vermont (1st district)	March 21, 1912	54	Influenza, unspecified liver issues	Washington, D.C.	Lakeview Cemetery, Burlington, Vermont	Frank L. Greene	March 4, 1901	June 27, 1857	Barnet, Vermont	62nd (1911–1913)
Henry H. Bingham	Republican	Pennsylvania (1st district)	March 22, 1912	70	Unspecified heart and kidney issues	Philadelphia, Pennsylvania	Laurel Hill Cemetery, Pennsylvania	William S. Vare	March 4, 1879	December 4, 1841	Philadelphia, Pennsylvania	62nd (1911–1913)
Robert Love Taylor	Democratic	Tennessee (Senator)	March 31, 1912	61	Gallstone surgery complications	Washington, D.C.	Monte Vista Memorial Park, Johnson City, Tennessee	Newell Sanders	March 4, 1907 (U.S. House tenure March 4, 1879 – March 3, 1881)	July 31, 1850	Carter County, Tennessee	62nd (1911–1913)
Elbert H. Hubbard	Republican	Iowa (11th district)	June 4, 1912	62	Heart disease	Washington, D.C.	Floyd Cemetery, Sioux City, Indiana	George Cromwell Scott	March 4, 1905	August 19, 1849	Rushville, Indiana	62nd (1911–1913)
George S. Nixon	Republican	Nevada (Senator)	June 5, 1912	52	Meningitis caused by surgery complications	Washington, D.C.	Masonic Cemetery, Reno, Nevada	William A. Massey	March 4, 1905	April 2, 1860	Newcastle, California	62nd (1911–1913)
Robert Charles Wickliffe	Democratic	Louisiana (6th district)	June 11, 1912	38	Hit by train	Washington, D.C.	Cave Hill Cemetery, Louisville, Kentucky	Lewis Lovering Morgan	March 4, 1909	May 1, 1874	Bardstown, Kentucky	62nd (1911–1913)
George R. Malby	Republican	New York (26th district)	July 5, 1912	54	Unspecified heart issues	New York City, New York	Ogdensburg Cemetery, Ogdensburg, New York	Edwin A. Merritt	March 4, 1907	September 16, 1857	Canton, New York	62nd (1911–1913)
Carl C. Anderson	Democratic	Ohio (13th district)	October 1, 1912	34	Car crash	Fostoria, Ohio	Oakwood Cemetery, Fremont, Ohio	John A. Key	March 4, 1909	December 2, 1877	Bluffton, Ohio	62nd (1911–1913)
Weldon Brinton Heyburn	Republican	Idaho (Senator)	October 17, 1912	60	Unspecified heart and kidney issues	Washington, D.C.	Birmingham-Lafayette Cemetery, Birmingham Township, Chester County, Pennsylvania	Kirtland I. Perky	March 4, 1903	May 23, 1852	Chadds Ford, Pennsylvania	62nd (1911–1913)
Richard E. Connell	Democratic	New York (21st district)	October 30, 1912	54	Heart disease	Poughkeepsie, New York	St. Peter's Cemetery, Poughkeepsie, New York	Henry George Jr.	March 4, 1911	November 6, 1857	Poughkeepsie, New York	62nd (1911–1913)
George H. Utter	Republican	Rhode Island (2nd district)	November 3, 1912	58	Liver cancer	Westerly, Rhode Island	Riverbend Cemetery, Westerly, Rhode Island	Peter G. Gerry	March 4, 1911	July 24, 1854	Plainfield, New Jersey	62nd (1911–1913)
Isidor Rayner	Democratic	Maryland (Senator)	November 25, 1912	62	Neuritis	Washington, D.C.	Rock Creek Cemetery, Washington, D.C.	William P. Jackson	March 4, 1905 (U.S. House tenure March 4, 1887 – March 3, 1889 and March 4, 1891 – March 3, 1895)	April 11, 1850	Baltimore, Maryland	62nd (1911–1913)
John Geiser McHenry	Democratic	Pennsylvania (16th district)	December 27, 1912	44	Apoplexy	Benton, Pennsylvania	Benton Cemetery, Benton, Pennsylvania	John V. Lesher	March 4, 1907	April 26, 1868	Benton Township, Columbia County, Pennsylvania	62nd (1911–1913)
William Wedemeyer	Republican	Michigan (2nd district)	January 2, 1913	39	Drowning/Suicide	Colón, Panama	Panama	Samuel Beakes	March 4, 1911	March 22, 1873	Washtenaw County, Michigan	62nd (1911–1913)
Jeff Davis	Democratic	Arkansas (Senator)	January 3, 1913	50	Apoplexy	Little Rock, Arkansas	Mount Holly Cemetery, Little Rock, Arkansas	John N. Heiskell	March 4, 1907	May 6, 1862	Rocky Comfort, Arkansas	62nd (1911–1913)
Sylvester C. Smith	Republican	California (8th district)	January 26, 1913	54	Heart failure	Los Angeles, California	Union Cemetery, Los Angeles, California	Everis A. Hayes	March 4, 1905	August 26, 1858	Mount Pleasant, Iowa	62nd (1911–1913)
George Swinton Legare	Democratic	South Carolina (1st district)	January 31, 1913	43	Unspecified prolonged illness	St. Andrews, South Carolina	Magnolia Cemetery, Charleston, South Carolina	Richard S. Whaley	March 4, 1903	November 11, 1869	Rockville, South Carolina	62nd (1911–1913)
Lewis J. Martin	Democratic	New Jersey (6th district)	May 5, 1913	69	Apoplexy	Washington, D.C.	Newton Cemetery, Newton, New Jersey	Archibald C. Hart	March 4, 1913	February 22, 1844	Deckertown, New Jersey	63rd (1913–1915)
Forrest Goodwin	Republican	Maine (3rd district)	May 28, 1913	50	Cirrhosis of the liver	Portland, Maine	South Side Cemetery, Skowhegan, Maine	John A. Peters	March 4, 1913	June 14, 1862	Skowhegan, Maine	63rd (1913–1915)
George Konig	Democratic	Maryland (3rd district)	May 31, 1913	57	Pneumonia	Baltimore, Maryland	Baltimore Cemetery, Baltimore, Maryland	Charles Pearce Coady	March 4, 1911	January 28, 1856	Maryland	63rd (1913–1915)
Joseph F. Johnston	Democratic	Alabama (Senator)	August 8, 1913	70	Pneumonia	Washington, D.C.	Elmwood Cemetery, Birmingham, Alabama	Francis S. White	August 6, 1907	March 23, 1843	Lincoln County, North Carolina	63rd (1913–1915)
Timothy Sullivan	Democratic	New York (13th district)	August 31, 1913	51	Hit by train	Bronx, New York	Calvary Cemetery, Queens, New York	Daniel J. Riordan	March 4, 1913 (previously served March 4, 1903 – July 27, 1906)	July 23, 1862	Manhattan, New York	63rd (1913–1915)
William Wilder	Republican	Massachusetts (3rd district)	September 11, 1913	58	Nephritis	Washington, D.C.	Crystal Lake Cemetery, Gardner, Massachusetts	Calvin D. Paige	March 4, 1911	May 14, 1855	Belfast, Maine	63rd (1913–1915)
Seaborn Roddenbery	Democratic	Georgia (2nd district)	September 25, 1913	43	Head and neck cancer	Thomasville, Georgia	Laurel Hill Cemetery, Thomasville, Georgia	Frank Park	February 6, 1910	January 12, 1870	Decatur County, Georgia	63rd (1913–1915)
Irvin S. Pepper	Democratic	Iowa (2nd district)	December 22, 1913	37	Surgery complications	Clinton County, Iowa	Shaul Cemetery, Ottumwa, Iowa	Henry Vollmer	March 4, 1911	June 10, 1876	Davis County, Iowa	63rd (1913–1915)
Robert G. Bremner	Democratic	New Jersey (7th district)	February 5, 1914	39	Head and neck cancer	Baltimore, Maryland	Laurel Grove Memorial Park, Totowa, New Jersey	Dow H. Drukker	March 4, 1913	December 17, 1874	Reiss, Scotland, U.K.	63rd (1913–1915)
Augustus Octavius Bacon	Democratic	Georgia (Senator)	February 14, 1914	74	Coronary occlusion	Washington, D.C.	Rose Hill Cemetery, Macon, Georgia	William S. West	March 4, 1895	October 20, 1839	Bryan County, Georgia	63rd (1913–1915)
William N. Richardson	Democratic	Alabama (8th district)	March 31, 1914	74	Arteriosclerosis	Atlantic City, New Jersey	Maple Hill Cemetery, Huntsville, Alabama	Christopher C. Harris	August 6, 1900	May 8, 1839	Athens, Alabama	63rd (1913–1915)
William O'Connell Bradley	Republican	Kentucky (Senator)	May 23, 1914	67	Uremia caused by complications from streetcar fall	Washington, D.C.	Frankfort Cemetery, Frankfort, Kentucky	Johnson N. Camden Jr.	March 4, 1909	March 18, 1847	Garrard County, Kentucky	63rd (1913–1915)
Edwin Albert Merritt	Republican	New York (31st district)	December 4, 1914	54	Unknown	Potsdam, New York	Pierrepont Hill Cemetery, Pierrepont, New York	Bertrand H. Snell	November 5, 1912	July 25, 1860	Pierrepont, New York	63rd (1913–1915)
Sereno E. Payne	Republican	New York (36th district)	December 10, 1914	71	Heart failure	Washington, D.C.	Fort Hill Cemetery, Auburn, New York	Norman J. Gould	December 2, 1889 (previously served March 4, 1883 – March 3, 1887)	June 26, 1843	Hamilton, New York	63rd (1913–1915)
Joseph A. Goulden	Democratic	New York (23rd district)	May 3, 1915	70	Unknown	Philadelphia, Pennsylvania	St. Joseph's Cemetery, Taneytown, Maryland	William S. Bennet	March 4, 1913 (previously served March 4, 1903 – March 3, 1911)	August 1, 1844	Littlestown, Pennsylvania	64th (1915–1917)
Samuel Andrew Witherspoon	Democratic	Mississippi (5th district)	November 24, 1915	60	Dyspepsia heart complications	Meridian, Mississippi	Rose Hill Cemetery, Meridian, Mississippi	William W. Venable	March 4, 1911	May 4, 1855	Columbus, Mississippi	64th (1915–1917)
William Gay Brown Jr.	Democratic	West Virginia (1st district)	March 9, 1916	59	Stroke	Washington, D.C.	Kingwood Cemetery, Kingwood, West Virginia	George Meade Bowers	March 4, 1911	April 7, 1856	Kingwood, Virginia	64th (1915–1917)
Benjamin F. Shively	Democratic	Indiana (Senator)	March 14, 1916	58	Head and neck cancer	Washington, D.C.	Brookville Cemetery, Brookville, Pennsylvania	Thomas Taggart	March 4, 1909 (U.S. House tenure December 1, 1884 – March 3, 1885 and March 4, 1887 – March 3, 1893)	March 20, 1857	Osceola, Indiana	64th (1915–1917)
Edwin C. Burleigh	Republican	Maine (Senator)	June 16, 1916	72	Dyspepsia	Augusta, Maine	Forest Grove Cemetery, Augusta, Maine	Bert M. Fernald	March 4, 1913 (U.S. House tenure June 21, 1897 – March 3, 1911)	November 27, 1843	Linneus, Maine	64th (1915–1917)
Hunter Holmes Moss Jr.	Republican	West Virginia (4th district)	July 15, 1916	42	Stomach cancer	Atlantic City, New Jersey	Odd Fellows Cemetery, Parkersburg, West Virginia	Harry C. Woodyard	March 4, 1913	May 26, 1874	Parkersburg, West Virginia	64th (1915–1917)
James Paul Clarke	Democratic	Arkansas (Senator)	October 1, 1916	62	Apoplexy	Little Rock, Arkansas	Oakland Cemetery, Little Rock, Arkansas	William F. Kirby	March 4, 1903	August 18, 1854	Yazoo City, Mississippi	64th (1915–1917)
Luis Muñoz Rivera	Unionist	Puerto Rico (Resident Commissioner)	November 15, 1916	57	Following operation for "acute liver trouble"	San Juan, Puerto Rico	San Antonio De Paduas Cemetery, Barranquitas, Puerto Rico	Félix Córdova Dávila	March 4, 1911	July 17, 1859	Barranquitas, Puerto Rico	64th (1915–1917)
Samuel Joelah Tribble	Democratic	Georgia (8th district)	December 8, 1916	47	Apoplexy	Washington, D.C.	Oconee Hill Cemetery, Athens, Georgia	Tinsley W. Rucker Jr.	March 4, 1911	November 15, 1869	Carnesville, Georgia	64th (1915–1917)
David E. Finley	Democratic	South Carolina (5th district)	January 26, 1917	55	Pneumonia, unspecified kidney issues	Charlotte, North Carolina	Rose Hill Cemetery, York, South Carolina	Paul G. McCorkle	March 4, 1899	February 28, 1861	Trenton, Arkansas	64th (1915–1917)
Michael F. Conry	Democratic	New York (15th district)	March 2, 1917	46	Heart and kidney diseases	Washington, D.C.	Calvary Cemetery, Queens, New York	Thomas F. Smith	March 4, 1909	April 2, 1870	Shenandoah, Pennsylvania	64th (1915–1917)
Cyrus A. Sulloway	Republican	New Hampshire (1st district)	March 11, 1917	77	Pneumonia	Washington, D.C.	Franklin Cemetery, Franklin, New Hampshire	Sherman E. Burroughs	March 4, 1915 (previously served March 4, 1895 – March 3, 1913)	June 8, 1839	Grafton, New Hampshire	65th (1917–1919)
Henry Thomas Helgesen	Republican	North Dakota (1st district)	April 10, 1917	59	Surgery complications	Washington, D.C.	Phelps Cemetery, Decorah, Iowa	John Miller Baer	March 4, 1911	June 26, 1857	Decorah, Iowa	65th (1917–1919)
Daniel Webster Comstock	Republican	Indiana (6th district)	May 19, 1917	76	Pneumonia	Washington, D.C.	Earlham Cemetery, Richmond, Indiana	Richard N. Elliott	March 4, 1917	December 16, 1840	Germantown, Ohio	65th (1917–1919)
Harry Lane	Democratic	Oregon (Senator)	May 23, 1917	61	Stroke	San Francisco, California	Lone Fir Cemetery, Portland, Oregon	Charles L. McNary	March 4, 1913	August 28, 1855	Corvallis, Oregon	65th (1917–1919)
Ebenezer J. Hill	Republican	Connecticut (4th district)	September 27, 1917	72	Unspecified illness, heat stroke	Norwalk, Connecticut	Riverside Cemetery, Norwalk, Connecticut	Schuyler Merritt	March 4, 1915 (previously served March 4, 1895 – March 3, 1913)	August 4, 1845	Redding, Connecticut	65th (1917–1919)
Paul O. Husting	Democratic	Wisconsin (Senator)	October 21, 1917	51	Hunting shooting accident	Rush Lake, Wisconsin	Graceland Cemetery, Mayville, Wisconsin	Irvine Lenroot	March 4, 1915	April 25, 1866	Fond du Lac, Wisconsin	65th (1917–1919)
Charles Martin	Democratic	Illinois (4th district)	October 28, 1917	61	Peritonitis and unspecified stomach issues	Chicago, Illinois	Mount Olivet Cemetery, Chicago, Illinois	John W. Rainey	March 4, 1917	May 20, 1856	Ogdensburg, New York	65th (1917–1919)
Ellsworth Raymond Bathrick	Democratic	Ohio (14th district)	December 23, 1917	54	Unknown	Akron, Ohio	Glendale Cemetery, Akron, Ohio	Martin Luther Davey	March 4, 1917 (previously served March 4, 1911 – March 3, 1915)	January 6, 1863	Pontiac, Michigan	65th (1917–1919)
Francis G. Newlands	Democratic	Nevada (Senator)	December 24, 1917	71	Heart failure	Washington, D.C.	Oak Hill Cemetery, Washington, D.C.	Charles B. Henderson	March 4, 1903 (U.S. House tenure March 4, 1893 – March 3, 1903)	August 28, 1846	Natchez, Mississippi	65th (1917–1919)
James H. Brady	Republican	Idaho (Senator)	January 13, 1918	55	Heart attack	Washington, D.C.	James H. Brady Memorial Chapel, Pocatello, Idaho	John F. Nugent	February 6, 1913	June 12, 1862	Indiana County, Pennsylvania	65th (1917–1919)
William Hughes	Democratic	New Jersey (Senator)	January 30, 1918	45	Pneumonia	Trenton, New Jersey	Cedar Lawn Cemetery, Paterson, New Jersey	David Baird	March 4, 1913 (U.S. House tenure March 4, 1903 – March 3, 1905 and March 4, 1907 – September 27, 1912)	April 3, 1872	Drogheda, Ireland, U.K.	65th (1917–1919)
John H. Capstick	Republican	New Jersey (5th district)	March 17, 1918	61	Heart disease	Montville, New Jersey	Greenwood Cemetery, Boonton, New Jersey	William F. Birch	March 4, 1915	September 2, 1856	Lawrence, Massachusetts	65th (1917–1919)
Robert F. Broussard	Democratic	Louisiana (Senator)	April 12, 1918	53	Unknown	New Iberia, Louisiana	Catholic Cemetery, Louisiana	Walter Guion	March 4, 1915 (U.S. House tenure March 4, 1897 – March 3, 1915)	August 17, 1864	New Iberia, Louisiana	65th (1917–1919)
William J. Stone	Democratic	Missouri (Senator)	April 14, 1918	69	Paralysis	Washington, D.C.	Nevada, Missouri	Xenophon P. Wilfley	March 4, 1903 (U.S. House tenure March 4, 1885 – March 3, 1891)	May 7, 1848	Madison County, Kentucky	65th (1917–1919)
William A. Jones	Democratic	Virginia (1st district)	April 17, 1918	69	Paralysis	Washington, D.C.	St. John's Episcopal Church Cemetery, Warsaw, Virginia	S. Otis Bland	March 4, 1891	March 21, 1849	Warsaw, Virginia	65th (1917–1919)
Benjamin Tillman	Democratic	South Carolina (Senator)	July 3, 1918	70	Intracerebral hemorrhage	Washington, D.C.	Ebenezer Cemetery, Trenton, South Carolina	Christie Benet	March 4, 1895	August 11, 1847	Trenton, South Carolina	65th (1917–1919)
James H. Davidson	Republican	Wisconsin (6th district)	August 6, 1918	60	Heart disease	Washington, D.C.	Riverside Cemetery, Oshkosh, Wisconsin	Florian Lampert	March 4, 1917 (previously served March 4, 1897 – March 3, 1913)	June 18, 1858	Colchester, New York	65th (1917–1919)
Jacob H. Gallinger	Republican	New Hampshire (Senator)	August 17, 1918	81	Arteriosclerosis	Franklin, New Hampshire	Blossom Hill Cemetery, Concord, New Hampshire	Irving W. Drew	March 4, 1891 (U.S. House tenure March 4, 1885 – March 3, 1889)	March 28, 1837	Cornwall, Ontario, Canada	65th (1917–1919)
Ollie M. James	Democratic	Kentucky (Senator)	August 28, 1918	47	Nephritis	Baltimore, Maryland	Mapleview Cemetery, Marion, Kentucky	George B. Martin	March 4, 1913 (U.S. House tenure March 4, 1903 – March 3, 1913)	July 27, 1871	Marion, Kentucky	65th (1917–1919)
Joshua Frederick Cockey Talbott	Democratic	Maryland (2nd district)	October 5, 1918	75	Uremia	Lutherville, Maryland	Sherwood Cemetery, Cockeysville, Maryland	Carville D. Benson	March 4, 1903 (previously served March 4, 1879 – March 3, 1885 and March 4, 1893 – March 3, 1895)	July 29, 1843	Lutherville, Maryland	65th (1917–1919)
Jacob Edwin Meeker	Republican	Missouri (10th district)	October 16, 1918	40	H1N1 Influenza (Spanish Flu)	St. Louis, Missouri	Union Cemetery, Attica, Indiana	Frederick Essen	March 4, 1915	October 7, 1878	Attica, Indiana	65th (1917–1919)
John Allen Sterling	Republican	Illinois (17th district)	October 17, 1918	61	Car crash	Pontiac, Illinois	Park Hill Cemetery, Bloomington, Illinois	Frank L. Smith	March 4, 1915 (previously served March 4, 1903 – March 3, 1913)	February 1, 1857	Le Roy, Illinois	65th (1917–1919)
Edward Everett Robbins	Republican	Pennsylvania (22nd district)	January 25, 1919	58	H1N1 Influenza (Spanish Flu)	Somerset, Pennsylvania	Saint Clair Cemetery, Greensburg, Pennsylvania	John Haden Wilson	March 4, 1917 (previously served March 4, 1897 – March 3, 1899)	September 27, 1860	Westmoreland County, Pennsylvania	65th (1917–1919)
William Patterson Borland	Democratic	Missouri (5th district)	February 20, 1919	51	Pneumonia	Koblenz, Germany	Elmwood Cemetery, Kansas City, Missouri	William T. Bland	March 4, 1909	October 14, 1867	Leavenworth, Kansas	65th (1917–1919)
Harvey Helm	Democratic	Kentucky (8th district)	March 3, 1919	53	"Acute indigestion"	Columbus, Mississippi	Buffalo Spring Cemetery, Stanford, Kentucky	King Swope	March 4, 1907	December 2, 1865	Danville, Kentucky	65th (1917–1919)
Charles August Sulzer	Democratic	Alaska (Delegate)	April 15, 1919	40	Unspecified stomach issues	Sulzer, Alaska Territory	Evergreen Cemetery, Hillside, New Jersey	George B. Grigsby	March 4, 1919 (previously served March 4, 1917 – January 7, 1919)	February 24, 1879	Roselle, New Jersey	66th (1919–1921)
Albert Estopinal	Democratic	Louisiana (1st district)	April 28, 1919	74	Unspecified heart issues	St. Bernard Parish, Louisiana	Saint Louis Cemetery III, New Orleans, Louisiana	James O'Connor	November 3, 1908	January 30, 1845	St. Bernard Parish, Louisiana	66th (1919–1921)
John L. Burnett	Democratic	Alabama (7th district)	May 13, 1919	65	Heart failure	Gadsden, Alabama	Forest Cemetery, Gadsden, Alabama	Lilius Bratton Rainey	March 4, 1899	January 20, 1854	Cedar Bluff, Alabama	66th (1919–1921)
Carl Van Dyke	Democratic	Minnesota (4th district)	May 20, 1919	38	Gastrointestinal bleeding	Washington, D.C.	Forest Cemetery, St. Paul, Minnesota	Oscar Keller	March 4, 1915	February 18, 1881	Alexandria, Minnesota	66th (1919–1921)
J. Willard Ragsdale	Democratic	South Carolina (6th district)	July 23, 1919	46	Dilated cardiomyopathy	Washington, D.C.	Mount Hope Cemetery, Florence, South Carolina	Philip H. Stoll	March 4, 1913	December 14, 1872	Timmonsville, South Carolina	66th (1919–1921)
Joseph Bryan Thompson	Democratic	Oklahoma (5th district)	September 18, 1919	48	Nephritis	Martinsburg, West Virginia	Mount Olivet Cemetery, Pauls Valley, Oklahoma	John W. Harreld	March 4, 1913	April 29, 1871	Sherman, Texas	66th (1919–1921)
Thomas S. Martin	Democratic	Virginia (Senator)	November 12, 1919	72	Leaking mitral heart valve	Charlottesville, Virginia	University of Virginia Cemetery, Charlottesville, Virginia	Carter Glass	March 4, 1895	July 29, 1847	Scottsville, Virginia	66th (1919–1921)
Walter Allen Watson	Democratic	Virginia (4th district)	December 24, 1919	52	Mastoiditis	Washington, D.C.	Family cemetery, Nottoway County, Virginia	Patrick H. Drewry	March 4, 1913	November 25, 1867	Nottoway County, Virginia	66th (1919–1921)

== 1920s ==
Member	Party	State (district)	Date of death	Age at death (years)	Cause	Place of death	Place of burial	Successor	Serving since (in the House/Senate)	Date of birth	Place of birth	U.S. Congress
John H. Bankhead	Democratic	Alabama (Senator)	March 1, 1920	77	Myocarditis, influenza	Washington, D.C.	Oak Hill Cemetery, Jasper, Alabama	B. B. Comer	June 11, 1907 (U.S. House tenure March 4, 1887 – March 3, 1907)	September 13, 1842	Marion County, Alabama	66th (1919–1921)
William J. Browning	Republican	New Jersey (1st district)	March 24, 1920	69	Heart disease	Washington, D.C.	Harleigh Cemetery, Camden, New Jersey	Francis F. Patterson Jr.	November 7, 1911	April 11, 1850	Camden, New Jersey	66th (1919–1921)
Charles Archibald Nichols	Republican	Michigan (13th district)	April 25, 1920	43	Heart failure	Washington, D.C.	Grand Lawn Cemetery, Detroit, Michigan	Clarence McLeod	March 4, 1915	August 25, 1876	Boyne City, Michigan	66th (1919–1921)
Dick Thompson Morgan	Republican	Oklahoma (8th district)	July 4, 1920	66	Pneumonia	Danville, Illinois	Rose Hill Burial Park, Oklahoma City, Oklahoma	Charles Swindall	March 4, 1909	December 6, 1853	Prairie Creek, Indiana	66th (1919–1921)
Mahlon Morris Garland	Republican	Pennsylvania (at-large)	November 19, 1920	64	Heart disease	Washington, D.C.	Woodlawn Cemetery, Pittsburgh, Pennsylvania	Thomas S. Crago	March 4, 1915	May 4, 1856	Pittsburgh, Pennsylvania	66th (1919–1921)
Charles F. Booher	Democratic	Missouri (4th district)	January 21, 1921	72	Unknown	Savannah, Missouri	City Cemetery, Savannah, Missouri	Charles L. Faust	March 4, 1907 (previously served February 19, 1889 – March 3, 1889)	January 31, 1848	East Groveland, New York	66th (1919–1921)
Fred L. Blackmon	Democratic	Alabama (4th district)	February 8, 1921	47	Heart disease	Bartow, Florida	Hillside Cemetery, Anniston, Alabama	Lamar Jeffers	March 4, 1911	September 15, 1873	Lime Branch, Georgia	66th (1919–1921)
Champ Clark	Democratic	Missouri (9th district)	March 2, 1921	70	Pleurisy and unspecified stomach issues	Washington, D.C.	Bowling Green City Cemetery, Bowling Green, Missouri	Theodore W. Hukriede	March 4, 1897 (previously served March 4, 1893 – March 3, 1895)	March 7, 1850	Lawrenceburg, Kentucky	66th (1919–1921)
William H. Frankhauser	Republican	Michigan (3rd district)	May 9, 1921	58	Suicide	Battle Creek, Michigan	Oak Grove Cemetery, Hillsdale, Michigan	John M. C. Smith	March 4, 1921	March 5, 1863	Wood County, Ohio	67th (1921–1923)
William E. Mason	Republican	Illinois (at-large)	June 16, 1921	70	Heart disease	Washington, D.C.	Oakwood Cemetery, Waukegan, Illinois	Winnifred S. M. Huck	March 4, 1917 (previously served March 4, 1887 – March 3, 1891/U.S. Senate tenure March 4, 1897 – March 3, 1903)	July 7, 1850	Franklinville, New York	67th (1921–1923)
Rorer A. James	Democratic	Virginia (5th district)	August 6, 1921	62	Heart attack	Danville, Virginia	Green Hill Cemetery, Danville, Virginia	J. Murray Hooker	June 1, 1920	March 1, 1859	Brosville, Virginia	67th (1921–1923)
Samuel M. Taylor	Democratic	Arkansas (6th district)	September 13, 1921	69	Pleurisy, pneumonia	Washington, D.C.	Bellewood Cemetery, Pine Bluff, Arkansas	Chester W. Taylor	January 15, 1913	May 25, 1852	Fulton, Mississippi	67th (1921–1923)
Philander C. Knox	Republican	Pennsylvania (Senator)	October 12, 1921	68	Apoplexy	Washington, D.C.	Washington Memorial Cemetery, Valley Forge, Pennsylvania, U.S	William E. Crow	March 4, 1917 (previously served June 10, 1904 – March 3, 1909)	May 6, 1853	Brownsville, Pennsylvania	67th (1921–1923)
Henry D. Flood	Democratic	Virginia (10th district)	December 8, 1921	56	Heart failure, bronchitis	Washington, D.C.	Appomattox, Virginia	Henry S. Tucker III	March 4, 1901	September 2, 1865	Appomattox County, Virginia	67th (1921–1923)
John A. Elston	Republican	California (6th district)	December 15, 1921	47	Suicide	Washington, D.C.	Chapel of the Chimes, Oakland, California, U.S	James H. MacLafferty	March 4, 1915	February 10, 1874	Woodland, California	67th (1921–1923)
Boies Penrose	Republican	Pennsylvania (Senator)	December 31, 1921	61	Pulmonary thrombosis	Washington, D.C.	Laurel Hill Cemetery, Philadelphia, Pennsylvania	George Pepper	March 4, 1897	November 1, 1860	Philadelphia, Pennsylvania	67th (1921–1923)
Jonah Kūhiō Kalanianaʻole	Republican	Hawaii (Delegate)	January 7, 1922	50	Heart failure	Waikīkī, Oʻahu, Territory of Hawaii	Mauna ʻAla Royal Mausoleum	Henry Alexander Baldwin	March 4, 1903	March 26, 1871	Kukui‘ula, Kōloa, Kauaʻi, Kingdom of Hawaii	67th (1921–1923)
Lucian W. Parrish	Democratic	Texas (13th district)	March 27, 1922	44	Car crash	Wichita Falls, Texas	Hope Cemetery, Henrietta, Texas	Guinn Williams	March 4, 1919	January 10, 1878	Van Alstyne, Texas	67th (1921–1923)
Samuel M. Brinson	Democratic	North Carolina (3rd district)	April 13, 1922	52	Liver cancer	New Bern, North Carolina	Cedar Grove Cemetery, New Bern, North Carolina	Charles L. Abernethy	March 4, 1919	March 20, 1870	New Bern, North Carolina	67th (1921–1923)
Moses P. Kinkaid	Republican	Nebraska (6th district)	July 6, 1922	66	Heart disease	Washington D.C.	Prospect Hill Cemetery, O'Neill, Nebraska	Augustin Reed Humphrey	March 4, 1903	January 24, 1856	Morgantown, Virginia	67th (1921–1923)
William E. Crow	Republican	Pennsylvania (Senator)	August 2, 1922	52	Pernicious anemia	Uniontown, Pennsylvania	Uniontown Cemetery, Uniontown, Pennsylvania	David Reed	October 24, 1921	March 10, 1870	German Township, Pennsylvania	67th (1921–1923)
Lemuel P. Padgett	Democratic	Tennessee (7th district)	August 2, 1922	66	Unknown	Washington, D.C.	Rose Hill Cemetery, Columbia, Tennessee	Clarence W. Turner	March 4, 1901	November 28, 1855	Columbia, Tennessee	67th (1921–1923)
Charles Robert Connell	Republican	Pennsylvania (10th district)	September 26, 1922	58	Pleural effusion	Scranton, Pennsylvania	Forest Hill Cemetery, Dunmore, Pennsylvania	William W. Griest	March 4, 1921	September 22, 1864	Scranton, Pennsylvania	67th (1921–1923)
Thomas E. Watson	Democratic	Georgia (Senator)	September 26, 1922	66	Intracerebral hemorrhage	Washington, D.C.	Thomson City Cemetery, Thomson, Georgia	Rebecca L. Felton	March 4, 1921 (U.S. House tenure March 4, 1891 – March 3, 1893)	September 5, 1856	Thomson, Georgia	67th (1921–1923)
John I. Nolan	Republican	California (5th district)	November 18, 1922	48	Stomach ulceration	San Francisco, California	Holy Cross Cemetery, Colma, California	Mae E. Nolan	March 4, 1913	January 14, 1874	San Francisco, California	67th (1921–1923)
James R. Mann	Republican	Illinois (2nd district)	November 30, 1922	66	Pneumonia	Washington, D.C.	Oak Woods Cemetery, Chicago, Illinois	Morton D. Hull	March 4, 1897	October 20, 1856	Bloomington, Illinois	67th (1921–1923)
Nestor Montoya	Republican	New Mexico (at-large)	January 13, 1923	60	Unknown	Washington, D.C.	Santa Barbara Cemetery, Albuquerque, New Mexico	John Morrow	March 4, 1921	April 14, 1862	Albuquerque, New Mexico	67th (1921–1923)
Sherman Everett Burroughs	Republican	New Hampshire (1st district)	January 27, 1923	52	Unspecified lung affliction, influenza	Washington, D.C.	Pine Grove Cemetery, Manchester, New Hampshire	William Nathaniel Rogers	May 29, 1917	February 6, 1870	Dunbarton, New Hampshire	67th (1921–1923)
Henry Z. Osborne	Republican	California (10th district)	February 8, 1923	74	Unspecified heart issues	Los Angeles, California	Angelus-Rosedale Cemetery, Los Angeles, California	John D. Fredericks	March 4, 1917	October 4, 1848	New Lebanon, New York	67th (1921–1923)
William Bourke Cockran	Democratic	New York (16th district)	March 1, 1923	69	Apoplexy	Washington, D.C.	Gate of Heaven Cemetery, Hawthorne, New York	John J. O'Connor	March 4, 1921 (previously served March 4, 1887 – March 3, 1889; November 3, 1891 – March 3, 1895; and February 23, 1904 – March 3, 1909)	February 28, 1854	County Sligo, Ireland, U.K.	67th (1921–1923)
Samuel D. Nicholson	Republican	Colorado (Senator)	March 24, 1923	64	Liver cancer	Denver, Colorado	Fairmount Cemetery, Denver, Colorado	Alva B. Adams	March 4, 1921	February 22, 1859	Springfield, Prince Edward Island, Canada	68th (1923–1925)
John R. Tyson	Democratic	Alabama (2nd district)	March 27, 1923	66	Unknown	Montgomery, Alabama	Oakwood Cemetery, Montgomery, Alabama	J. Lister Hill	March 4, 1921	November 28, 1856	Lowndes County, Alabama	68th (1923–1925)
John M. C. Smith	Republican	Michigan (3rd district)	March 30, 1923	70	Angina pectoris	Charlotte, Michigan	Maple Hill Cemetery, Charlotte, Michigan	Arthur B. Williams	June 28, 1921 (previously served March 4, 1911 – March 3, 1921)	February 6, 1853	Belfast, Ireland, U.K.	68th (1923–1925)
Knute Nelson	Republican	Minnesota (Senator)	April 28, 1923	80	Unspecified heart issues, influenza	Timonium, Maryland	Kinkead Cemetery, Alexandria, Minnesota	Magnus Johnson	March 4, 1895 (U.S. House tenure March 4, 1883 – March 3, 1889)	February 2, 1843	Voss, Norway	68th (1923–1925)
Daniel J. Riordan	Democratic	New York (11th district)	April 28, 1923	52	Heart attack	Washington, D.C.	Calvary Cemetery, Queens, New York	Anning Smith Prall	November 6, 1906 (previously served March 4, 1899 - March 3, 1901)	July 7, 1870	New York City, New York	68th (1923–1925)
John W. Rainey	Democratic	Illinois (4th district)	May 4, 1923	42	Pneumonia	Chicago, Illinois	Calvary Cemetery, Evanston, Illinois	Thomas A. Doyle	April 2, 1918	December 21, 1880	Chicago, Illinois	68th (1923–1925)
Lewis E. Sawyer	Democratic	Arkansas (6th district)	May 5, 1923	55	Dilated cardiomyopathy	Hot Springs, Arkansas	Hollywood Cemetery, Hot Springs, Arkansas	James B. Reed	March 4, 1923	June 24, 1867	Shelby County, Alabama	68th (1923–1925)
Claude Kitchin	Democratic	North Carolina (2nd district)	May 31, 1923	54	Paralysis, unspecified stomach issues	Wilson, North Carolina	Baptist Cemetery, Scotland Neck, North Carolina	John H. Kerr	March 4, 1901	March 24, 1869	Scotland Neck, North Carolina	68th (1923–1925)
Luther W. Mott	Republican	New York (32nd district)	July 10, 1923	48	Unspecified digestion issues	Oswego, New York	Riverside Cemetery, Oswego, New York	Thaddeus C. Sweet	March 4, 1911	November 30, 1874	Oswego, New York	68th (1923–1925)
William P. Dillingham	Republican	Vermont (Senator)	July 12, 1923	79	Gall bladder surgery complications	Montpelier, Vermont	Hope Cemetery, Waterbury, Vermont	Porter H. Dale	October 18, 1900	December 12, 1843	Waterbury, Vermont	68th (1923–1925)
J. Campbell Cantrill	Democratic	Kentucky (7th district)	September 2, 1923	53	Peritonitis	Louisville, Kentucky	Georgetown Cemetery, Georgetown, Kentucky	Joseph W. Morris	March 4, 1909	July 9, 1870	Georgetown, Kentucky	68th (1923–1925)
James V. Ganly	Democratic	New York (24th district)	September 7, 1923	44	Car crash	New York City, New York	St. Raymond's Cemetery, The Bronx, New York	Benjamin L. Fairchild	March 4, 1923 (previously served March 4, 1919 – March 3, 1921)	September 13, 1878	New York City, New York	68th (1923–1925)
Benjamin G. Humphreys II	Democratic	Mississippi (3rd district)	October 16, 1923	58	Heart attack	Greenville, Mississippi	Greenville Cemetery, Greenville, Mississippi	William Y. Humphreys	March 4, 1903	August 17, 1865	Claiborne County, Mississippi	68th (1923–1925)
H. Garland Dupré	Democratic	Louisiana (2nd district)	February 21, 1924	50	Apoplexy	Washington, D.C.	Catholic Cemetery, Opelousas, Louisiana	James Z. Spearing	November 8, 1910	July 28, 1873	Opelousas, Louisiana	68th (1923–1925)
Edward C. Little	Republican	Kansas (2nd district)	June 27, 1924	65	Paralysis	Washington, D.C.	City Cemetery, Abilene, Kansas	U. S. Guyer	March 4, 1917	December 14, 1858	Newark, Ohio	68th (1923–1925)
LeBaron B. Colt	Republican	Rhode Island (Senator)	August 18, 1924	78	Nephritis, unspecified heart issues	Bristol, Rhode Island	Juniper Hill Cemetery, Bristol, Rhode Island	Jesse H. Metcalf	March 4, 1913	June 25, 1846	Dedham, Massachusetts	68th (1923–1925)
William S. Greene	Republican	Massachusetts (15th district)	September 22, 1924	83	Unknown	Fall River, Massachusetts	Oak Grove Cemetery, Fall River, Massachusetts	Robert M. Leach	May 31, 1898	April 28, 1841	Tremont, Illinois	68th (1923–1925)
Sydney Emanuel Mudd II	Republican	Maryland (5th district)	October 11, 1924	39	Bowel obstruction	Baltimore, Maryland	St. Ignatius Catholic Church Cemetery, Baltimore, Maryland	Stephen W. Gambrill	March 4, 1915	June 20, 1885	Charles County, Maryland	68th (1923–1925)
Frank B. Brandegee	Republican	Connecticut (Senator)	October 14, 1924	60	Suicide	Washington, D.C.	Cedar Grove Cemetery, New London, Connecticut	Hiram Bingham III	May 10, 1905 (U.S. House tenure November 4, 1902 – May 10, 1905)	July 8, 1864	New London, Connecticut	68th (1923–1925)
Henry Cabot Lodge	Republican	Massachusetts (Senator)	November 9, 1924	74	Stroke	Cambridge, Massachusetts	Mount Auburn Cemetery, Cambridge, Massachusetts	William M. Butler	March 4, 1893 (U.S. House tenure March 4, 1887 – March 3, 1893)	May 12, 1850	Beverly, Massachusetts	68th (1923–1925)
Julius Kahn	Republican	California (4th district)	December 18, 1924	63	Unspecified heart issues, intracerebral hemorrhage, kidney disease, foot infection	San Francisco, California	Home of Peace Cemetery, Colma, California	Florence Prag Kahn	March 4, 1905 (previously served March 4, 1899 – March 3, 1903)	February 28, 1861	Kuppenheim, Germany	68th (1923–1925)
Medill McCormick	Republican	Illinois (Senator)	February 25, 1925	47	Suicide	Washington, D.C.	Middle Creek Cemetery, Byron, Illinois	Charles S. Deneen	March 4, 1919 (U.S. House tenure March 4, 1917 – March 3, 1919)	May 16, 1877	Chicago, Illinois	68th (1923–1925)
John Jacob Rogers	Republican	Massachusetts (5th district)	March 28, 1925	43	Appendicitis	Washington, D.C.	Lowell Cemetery, Lowell, Massachusetts	Edith Nourse Rogers	March 4, 1913	August 18, 1881	Lowell, Massachusetts	69th (1925–1927)
Arthur B. Williams	Republican	Michigan (3rd district)	May 1, 1925	53	Blood clot	Baltimore, Maryland	Maple Hill Cemetery, Charlotte, Michigan	Joseph L. Hooper	June 19, 1923	January 27, 1872	Ashland, Ohio	69th (1925–1927)
Selden P. Spencer	Republican	Missouri (Senator)	May 16, 1925	62	Hernia surgery complications	Washington, D.C.	Bellefontaine Cemetery, St. Louis, Missouri	George H. Williams	November 6, 1918	September 16, 1862	Erie, Pennsylvania	69th (1925–1927)
Robert M. La Follette	Progressive	Wisconsin (Senator)	June 18, 1925	70	Cardiovascular disease	Washington, D.C.	Forest Hill Cemetery, Madison, Wisconsin	Robert M. La Follette Jr.	January 2, 1906 (U.S. House tenure March 4, 1885 – March 3, 1891)	June 14, 1855	Primrose, Wisconsin	69th (1925–1927)
Edwin F. Ladd	Republican	North Dakota (Senator)	June 22, 1925	65	Unspecified kidney issues, nephritis	Baltimore, Maryland	Glenwood Cemetery, Washington, D.C.	Gerald Nye	March 4, 1921	December 13, 1859	Starks, Maine	69th (1925–1927)
George B. Churchill	Republican	Massachusetts (2nd district)	July 1, 1925	58	Unknown	Amherst, Massachusetts	Wildwood Cemetery, Amherst, Massachusetts	Henry L. Bowles	March 4, 1925	October 24, 1866	Worcester, Massachusetts	69th (1925–1927)
Robert Y. Thomas Jr.	Democratic	Kentucky (3rd district)	September 3, 1925	70	Unspecified liver issues	Red Boiling Springs, Tennessee	Evergreen Cemetery, Greenville, Kentucky	John William Moore	March 4, 1909	July 13, 1855	Logan County, Kentucky	69th (1925–1927)
Samuel M. Ralston	Democratic	Indiana (Senator)	October 14, 1925	67	Nephritis	Indianapolis, Indiana	Oak Hill Cemetery, Lebanon, Indiana	Arthur Raymond Robinson	March 4, 1923	December 1, 1857	New Cumberland, Ohio	69th (1925–1927)
John E. Raker	Democratic	California (2nd district)	January 22, 1926	62	Stomach surgery complications	Washington, D.C.	Susanville Cemetery, Susanville, California	Harry Lane Englebright	March 4, 1911	February 22, 1863	Knox County, Illinois	69th (1925–1927)
Harry Irving Thayer	Republican	Massachusetts (8th district)	March 10, 1926	56	Unknown	Wakefield, Massachusetts	Lakeside Cemetery, Wakefield, Massachusetts	Frederick Dallinger	March 4, 1925	September 10, 1869	Pembroke, Massachusetts	69th (1925–1927)
Lawrence J. Flaherty	Republican	California (5th district)	June 13, 1926	47	Unknown	New York City, New York	Holy Cross Cemetery, San Mateo, California	Richard J. Welch	March 4, 1925	July 4, 1878	San Mateo, California	69th (1925–1927)
Charles E. Fuller	Republican	Illinois (12th district)	June 25, 1926	77	Unknown	Rochester, Minnesota	Belvidere Cemetery, Belvidere, Illinois	John T. Buckbee	March 4, 1915 (previously served March 4, 1903 – March 3, 1913)	March 31, 1849	Belvidere, Illinois	69th (1925–1927)
Albert B. Cummins	Republican	Iowa (Senator)	July 30, 1926	76	Heart failure	Des Moines, Iowa	Woodland Cemetery, Des Moines, Iowa	David W. Stewart	November 24, 1908	February 15, 1850	Carmichaels, Pennsylvania	69th (1925–1927)
Bert M. Fernald	Republican	Maine (Senator)	August 23, 1926	68	Heart disease	Poland, Maine	Highland Cemetery, Poland, Maine	Arthur R. Gould	September 12, 1916	April 3, 1858	Poland, Maine	69th (1925–1927)
William B. McKinley	Republican	Illinois (Senator)	December 7, 1926	70	Prostate cancer	Martinsville, Indiana	Mount Hope Cemetery, Champaign, Illinois	Otis F. Glenn	March 4, 1921 (U.S. House tenure March 4, 1905 – March 3, 1913 and March 4, 1915 – March 3, 1921)	September 5, 1856	Petersburg, Illinois	69th (1925–1927)
Ambrose E. B. Stephens	Republican	Ohio (2nd district)	February 12, 1927	64	Unknown	North Bend, Ohio	Maple Grove Cemetery, Cleves, Ohio	Charles Tatgenhorst Jr.	March 4, 1919	June 3, 1862	Crosby Township, Ohio	69th (1925–1927)
Ladislas Lazaro	Democratic	Louisiana (7th district)	March 30, 1927	54	Abdominal abscesses	Washington, D.C.	Old City Cemetery, Ville Platte, Louisiana	Vacant	March 4, 1913	June 5, 1872	Ville Platte, Louisiana	70th (1927–1929)
Walter W. Magee	Republican	New York (35th district)	May 25, 1927	66	Dilated cardiomyopathy	Syracuse, New York	Oakwood Cemetery, Syracuse, New York	Clarence E. Hancock	March 4, 1915	May 23, 1861	Groveland, New York	70th (1927–1929)
William N. Vaile	Republican	Colorado (1st district)	July 2, 1927	51	Heart attack	Grand Lake, Colorado	Fairmount Cemetery, Denver, Colorado	S. Harrison White	March 4, 1919	June 22, 1876	Kokomo, Indiana	70th (1927–1929)
Maurice E. Crumpacker	Republican	Oregon (3rd district)	July 24, 1927	40	Drowning	San Francisco, California	River View Cemetery, Portland, Oregon	Franklin F. Korell	March 4, 1925	December 19, 1886	Valparaiso, Indiana	70th (1927–1929)
Andrieus A. Jones	Democratic	New Mexico (Senator)	December 20, 1927	65	Coronary heart disease	Washington, D.C.	Masonic Cemetery, Las Vegas, Nevada	Bronson M. Cutting	March 4, 1917	May 16, 1862	Union City, Tennessee	70th (1927–1929)
Woodbridge N. Ferris	Democratic	Michigan (Senator)	March 23, 1928	75	Pneumonia	Washington, D.C.	Highlandview Cemetery, Big Rapids, Michigan	Arthur H. Vandenberg	March 4, 1923	January 6, 1853	Spencer, New York	70th (1927–1929)
Frank B. Willis	Republican	Ohio (Senator)	March 30, 1928	56	Intracerebral hemorrhage	Delaware, Ohio	Oak Grove Cemetery, Delaware, Ohio	Cyrus Locher	January 14, 1921 (U.S. House tenure March 4, 1911 – January 9, 1915)	December 28, 1871	Lewis Center, Ohio	70th (1927–1929)
James A. Gallivan	Democratic	Massachusetts (12th district)	April 3, 1928	61	Atherosclerosis	Arlington, Massachusetts	St. Joseph Cemetery, West Roxbury, Massachusetts	John W. McCormack	April 7, 1914	October 28, 1866	South Boston, Massachusetts	70th (1927–1929)
Martin B. Madden	Republican	Illinois (1st district)	April 27, 1928	73	Heart attack	Washington, D.C.	Fairview Cemetery, Hinsdale, Illinois	Oscar S. De Priest	March 4, 1905	March 21, 1855	Wolviston, County Durham, U.K.	70th (1927–1929)
Thaddeus C. Sweet	Republican	New York (32nd district)	May 1, 1928	55	Plane accident	Whitney Point, New York	Rural Cemetery, Phoenix, New York	Francis D. Culkin	November 6, 1923	November 16, 1872	Phoenix, New York	70th (1927–1929)
Thomas S. Butler	Republican	Pennsylvania (8th district)	May 26, 1928	72	Heart attack	Washington, D.C.	Oaklands Cemetery, West Chester, Pennsylvania	James Wolfenden	March 4, 1897	November 4, 1855	Uwchlan Township, Pennsylvania	70th (1927–1929)
Frank R. Gooding	Republican	Idaho (Senator)	June 24, 1928	68	Unspecified intestinal cancer	Gooding, Idaho	Elmwood Cemetery, Gooding, Idaho	John Thomas	January 15, 1921	September 16, 1859	Tiverton, Devon, England, U.K.	70th (1927–1929)
Henry R. Rathbone	Republican	Illinois (at-large)	July 15, 1928	58	Unknown	Chicago, Illinois	Rosehill Cemetery, Chicago, Illinois	Ruth Hanna McCormick	March 4, 1923	February 12, 1870	Washington, D.C.	70th (1927–1929)
Louis A. Frothingham	Republican	Massachusetts (14th district)	August 23, 1928	57	Unknown	North Haven, Maine	Village Cemetery, North Easton, Massachusetts	Richard B. Wigglesworth	March 4, 1921	July 13, 1871	Jamaica Plain, Boston, Massachusetts	70th (1927–1929)
Thomas L. Rubey	Democratic	Missouri (16th district)	November 2, 1928	66	Arteriosclerosis	Lebanon, Missouri	Lebanon Cemetery, Lebanon, Missouri	Rowland L. Johnston	March 4, 1923 (previously served March 4, 1911 – March 3, 1921)	September 27, 1862	Lebanon, Missouri	70th (1927–1929)
William Allan Oldfield	Democratic	Arkansas (2nd district)	November 19, 1928	54	Gall bladder surgery complications	Washington, D.C.	Oak Lawn Cemetery, Batesville, Arkansas	Pearl P. Oldfield	March 4, 1909	February 4, 1874	Franklin, Arkansas	70th (1927–1929)
Charles L. Faust	Republican	Missouri (4th district)	December 17, 1928	49	Apoplexy	Washington, D.C.	Highland Cemetery, Highland, Kansas	David W. Hopkins	March 4, 1921	April 24, 1879	Bellefontaine, Ohio	70th (1927–1929)
Edward J. King	Republican	Illinois (15th district)	February 17, 1929	61	Heart disease	Washington, D.C.	Hope Cemetery, Galesburg, Illinois	Burnett M. Chiperfield	March 4, 1915	July 1, 1867	Springfield, Massachusetts	70th (1927–1929)
Royal H. Weller	Democratic	New York (21st district)	March 1, 1929	47	Pneumonia	New York City, New York	Woodlawn Cemetery, New York City, New York	Joseph A. Gavagan	March 4, 1923	July 2, 1881	New York City, New York	70th (1927–1929)
Charles W. Roark	Republican	Kentucky (3rd district)	April 5, 1929	52	Bowel obstruction	Louisville, Kentucky	Evergreen Cemetery, Greenville, Kentucky	John W. Moore	March 4, 1929	January 22, 1877	Greenville, Kentucky	71st (1929–1931)
Whitmell P. Martin	Democratic	Louisiana (3rd district)	April 6, 1929	61	Stomach surgery complications	Washington, D.C.	St. John's Episcopal Cemetery, Thibodaux, Louisiana	Numa F. Montet	March 4, 1915	August 12, 1867	Napoleonville, Louisiana	71st (1929–1931)
John J. Casey	Democratic	Pennsylvania (12th district)	May 5, 1929	53	Stroke	Balboa, Canal Zone	St. Mary's Cemetery, Hanover Township, Luzerne County, Pennsylvania	Charles Murray Turpin	March 4, 1927 (previously served March 4, 1913 – March 3, 1917; March 4, 1919 – March 3, 1921; and March 4, 1923 – March 3, 1925)	May 26, 1875	Wilkes-Barre, Pennsylvania	71st (1929–1931)
Leslie J. Steele	Democratic	Georgia (5th district)	July 24, 1929	60	Gallstone surgery complications	Decatur, Georgia	Decatur Cemetery, Decatur, Georgia	Robert Ramspeck	March 4, 1927	November 21, 1868	Decatur, Georgia	71st (1929–1931)
Lawrence D. Tyson	Democratic	Tennessee (Senator)	August 24, 1929	68	Cerebral thrombosis	Strafford, Pennsylvania	Old Gray Cemetery, Knoxville, Tennessee	William Emerson Brock	March 4, 1925	July 4, 1861	Pitt County, North Carolina	71st (1929–1931)
Ole J. Kvale	Farmer–Labor	Minnesota (7th district)	September 11, 1929	60	Fire accident	Otter Tail Lake, Minnesota	Benson Cemetery, Benson, Minnesota	Paul John Kvale	March 4, 1923	February 6, 1869	Winneshiek County, Iowa	71st (1929–1931)
Theodore E. Burton	Republican	Ohio (Senator)	October 28, 1929	77	Influenza	Washington, D.C.	Lake View Cemetery, Cleveland, Ohio	Roscoe C. McCulloch	December 15, 1928 (U.S. House tenure March 4, 1889 – March 3, 1891; March 4, 1895 – March 3, 1909; and March 4, 1921 – December 15, 1928/previously served March 4, 1909 – March 3, 1915)	December 20, 1851	Jefferson, Ohio	71st (1929–1931)
Francis E. Warren	Republican	Wyoming (Senator)	November 24, 1929	85	Pneumonia, bronchitis	Washington, D.C.	Lakeview Cemetery, Cheyenne, Wyoming	Patrick J. Sullivan	March 4, 1895 (previously served November 24, 1890 – March 3, 1893)	June 20, 1844	Hinsdale, Massachusetts	71st (1929–1931)
William W. Griest	Republican	Pennsylvania (10th district)	December 5, 1929	71	Pneumonia	Mount Clemens, Michigan	Woodward Hill Cemetery, Lancaster, Pennsylvania	J. Roland Kinzer	March 4, 1909	September 22, 1858	Christiana, Pennsylvania	71st (1929–1931)
William K. Kaynor	Republican	Massachusetts (2nd district)	December 20, 1929	45	Plane accident	Washington, D.C.	Oak Grove Cemetery, Springfield, Massachusetts	William J. Granfield	March 4, 1929	November 29, 1884	Sanborn, Iowa	71st (1929–1931)
Elmer O. Leatherwood	Republican	Utah (2nd district)	December 24, 1929	57	Heart disease	Washington, D.C.	Mount Olivet Cemetery, Salt Lake City, Utah	Frederick C. Loofbourow	March 4, 1921	September 4, 1872	Waverly, Ohio	71st (1929–1931)

== 1930s ==
Member	Party	State (district)	Date of death	Age at death (years)	Cause	Place of death	Place of burial	Successor	Serving since (in the House/Senate)	Date of birth	Place of birth	U.S. Congress
James A. Hughes	Republican	West Virginia (4th district)	March 2, 1930	69	Heart disease	Marion, Ohio	Spring Hill Cemetery, Huntington, West Virginia	Robert Lynn Hogg	March 4, 1927 (previously served March 4, 1901 – March 3, 1915)	February 27, 1861	Corunna, Ontario, Canada	71st (1929–1931)
James P. Glynn	Republican	Connecticut (5th district)	March 6, 1930	62	Unknown	Washington, D.C.	St. Joseph Cemetery, Winsted, Connecticut	Edward W. Goss	March 4, 1925 (previously served March 4, 1915 – March 3, 1923)	November 12, 1867	Winsted, Connecticut	71st (1929–1931)
Robert Quincy Lee	Democratic	Texas (17th district)	April 18, 1930	61	Stroke	Washington, D.C.	Oakwood Cemetery, Cisco, Texas	Thomas L. Blanton	March 4, 1929	January 12, 1869	Coldwater, Mississippi	71st (1929–1931)
Stephen G. Porter	Republican	Pennsylvania (32nd district)	June 27, 1930	61	Cirrhosis	Pittsburgh, Pennsylvania	Highwood Cemetery, Pittsburgh, Pennsylvania	Edmund F. Erk	March 4, 1911	May 18, 1869	Salem, Ohio	71st (1929–1931)
Florian Lampert	Republican	Wisconsin (6th district)	July 18, 1930	67	Car accident	Fond du Lac, Wisconsin	Riverside Cemetery, Oshkosh, Wisconsin	Michael Reilly	November 5, 1918	July 8, 1863	West Bend, Wisconsin	71st (1929–1931)
Edgar Raymond Kiess	Republican	Pennsylvania (16th district)	July 20, 1930	54	Coronary thrombosis	Eagles Mere, Pennsylvania	Wildwood Cemetery, Williamsport, Pennsylvania	Robert F. Rich	March 4, 1913	August 26, 1875	Warrensville, Pennsylvania	71st (1929–1931)
Charles Manly Stedman	Democratic	North Carolina (5th district)	September 23, 1930	89	Apoplexy	Washington, D.C.	Cross Creek Cemetery, Fayetteville, North Carolina	Franklin W. Hancock Jr.	March 4, 1911	January 29, 1841	Pittsboro, North Carolina	71st (1929–1931)
William C. Hammer	Democratic	North Carolina (7th district)	September 26, 1930	65	Chronic myocarditis	Asheboro, North Carolina	City Cemetery, Asheboro, North Carolina	Hinton James	March 4, 1921	March 24, 1865	Randolph County, North Carolina	71st (1929–1931)
Charles F. Curry	Republican	California (3rd district)	October 10, 1930	72	Unknown	Washington, D.C.	National Memorial Park, Falls Church, Virginia	Charles F. Curry Jr.	March 4, 1913	March 14, 1858	Naperville, Illinois	71st (1929–1931)
Otis Wingo	Democratic	Arkansas (4th district)	October 21, 1930	53	Gall bladder surgery complications	Baltimore, Maryland	Rock Creek Cemetery, Washington, D.C.	Effiegene Wingo	March 4, 1913	June 18, 1877	Weakley County, Tennessee	71st (1929–1931)
John F. Quayle	Democratic	New York (7th district)	November 27, 1930	61	Pneumonia	Brooklyn, New York	St. John Cemetery, Queens, New York	John J. Delaney	March 4, 1923	December 1, 1868	Brooklyn, New York	71st (1929–1931)
Lee Slater Overman	Democratic	North Carolina (Senator)	December 12, 1930	76	Stomach hemorrhage	Washington, D.C.	Chestnut Hill Cemetery, Salisbury, North Carolina	Cameron A. Morrison	March 4, 1903	January 3, 1854	Salisbury, North Carolina	71st (1929–1931)
Frank L. Greene	Republican	Vermont (Senator)	December 17, 1930	60	Hernia surgery complications	St. Albans, Vermont	Greenwood Cemetery, St. Albans, Vermont	Frank C. Partridge	March 4, 1923 (U.S. House tenure July 30, 1912 – March 3, 1923)	February 10, 1870	St. Albans, Vermont	71st (1929–1931)
David J. O'Connell	Democratic	New York (9th district)	December 29, 1930	62	Unknown	New York City, New York	St. John's Cemetery, Brooklyn, New York	Stephen A. Rudd	March 4, 1923 (previously served March 4, 1919 – March 3, 1921)	December 25, 1868	New York City, New York	71st (1929–1931)
Henry Allen Cooper	Republican	Wisconsin (1st district)	March 1, 1931	80	Unspecified digestion issues	Washington, D.C.	Mound Cemetery, Racine, Wisconsin	Thomas Ryum Amlie	March 4, 1921 (previously served March 4, 1893 – March 3, 1919)	September 8, 1850	Spring Prairie, Wisconsin	71st (1929–1931)
James Benjamin Aswell	Democratic	Louisiana (8th district)	March 16, 1931	61	Heart attack	Washington, D.C.	Rock Creek Cemetery, Washington, D.C.	John H. Overton	March 4, 1913	December 23, 1869	Vernon, Louisiana	72nd (1931–1933)
Nicholas Longworth	Republican	Ohio (1st district)	April 9, 1931	61	Pneumonia	Aiken, South Carolina	Spring Grove Cemetery, Cincinnati, Ohio	John B. Hollister	March 4, 1915 (previously served March 4, 1903 – March 3, 1913)	November 5, 1869	Cincinnati, Ohio	72nd (1931–1933)
Charles A. Mooney	Democratic	Ohio (20th district)	May 29, 1931	52	Lobar pneumonia	Cleveland, Ohio	Gethsemane Cemetery, St. Marys, Ohio	Martin L. Sweeney	March 4, 1923 (previously served March 4, 1919 – March 3, 1921)	January 5, 1879	St. Marys, Ohio	72nd (1931–1933)
George S. Graham	Republican	Pennsylvania (2nd district)	July 4, 1931	80	Paralysis	Islip, New York	Woodlawn Cemetery, New York City, New York	Edward Stokes	March 4, 1913	September 13, 1850	Philadelphia, Pennsylvania	72nd (1931–1933)
Charles Gordon Edwards	Democratic	Georgia (1st district)	July 13, 1931	53	Heart attack	Atlanta, Georgia	Bonaventure Cemetery, Savannah, Georgia	Homer C. Parker	March 4, 1925 (previously served March 4, 1907 – March 3, 1917)	July 2, 1878	Daisy, Georgia	72nd (1931–1933)
Bird J. Vincent	Republican	Michigan (8th district)	July 18, 1931	51	Unspecified heart disease	USS Henderson	Forest Lawn Cemetery, Saginaw, Michigan	Michael J. Hart	March 4, 1923	March 6, 1880	Brandon Township, Michigan	72nd (1931–1933)
Samuel C. Major	Democratic	Missouri (7th district)	July 28, 1931	62	Cerebral hemorrhage	Fayette, Missouri	Fayette City Cemetery, Fayette, Missouri	Robert D. Johnson	March 4, 1931 (previously served March 4, 1919 – March 3, 1921 and March 4, 1923 – March 3, 1929)	July 2, 1869	Fayette, Missouri	72nd (1931–1933)
Dwight Morrow	Republican	New Jersey (Senator)	October 5, 1931	58	Cerebral hemorrhage	Englewood, New Jersey	Brookside Cemetery, Englewood, New Jersey	William W. Barbour	December 3, 1930	January 11, 1873	Huntington, West Virginia	72nd (1931–1933)
Ernest Robinson Ackerman	Republican	New Jersey (5th district)	October 18, 1931	68	Unspecified heart disease	Plainfield, New Jersey	Hillside Cemetery, Scotch Plains, New Jersey	Percy Hamilton Stewart	March 4, 1919	June 17, 1863	New York City, New York	72nd (1931–1933)
Fletcher Hale	Republican	New Hampshire (1st district)	October 22, 1931	48	Pneumonia, cerebral embolism	Brooklyn, New York	Union Cemetery, Laconia, New Hampshire	William Nathaniel Rogers	March 4, 1925	January 22, 1883	Portland, Maine	72nd (1931–1933)
Thaddeus H. Caraway	Democratic	Arkansas (Senator)	November 6, 1931	60	Coronary thrombosis following kidney stone surgery	Little Rock, Arkansas	Oaklawn Cemetery, Jonesboro, Arkansas	Hattie Caraway	March 4, 1921 (U.S. House tenure March 4, 1913 – March 3, 1921)	October 17, 1871	Springhill, Missouri	72nd (1931–1933)
Harry M. Wurzbach	Republican	Texas (14th district)	November 6, 1931	57	Appendectomy surgery complications	Seguin, Texas	San Antonio National Cemetery, San Antonio, Texas	Richard M. Kleberg	February 10, 1930 (previously served March 4, 1921 – March 3, 1929)	May 19, 1874	San Antonio, Texas	72nd (1931–1933)
Percy Quin	Democratic	Mississippi (7th district)	February 4, 1932	59	Heart attack	Washington, D.C.	City Cemetery, Natchez, Mississippi	Lawrence R. Ellzey	March 4, 1913	October 30, 1872	Liberty, Mississippi	72nd (1931–1933)
Samuel Rutherford	Democratic	Georgia (6th district)	February 4, 1932	61	Heart attack	Washington, D.C.	Oakland Cemetery, Forsyth, Georgia	Carlton Mobley	March 4, 1925	March 15, 1870	Culloden, Georgia	72nd (1931–1933)
Albert Henry Vestal	Republican	Indiana (8th district)	April 1, 1932	57	Heart attack	Washington, D.C.	East Maplewood Cemetery, Anderson, Indiana	John W. Boehne Jr.	March 4, 1917	January 18, 1875	Frankton, Indiana	72nd (1931–1933)
William J. Harris	Democratic	Georgia (Senator)	April 18, 1932	64	Heart attack	Washington, D.C.	Greenwood Cemetery, Cedartown, Georgia	John S. Cohen	March 4, 1919	February 3, 1868	Cedartown, Georgia	72nd (1931–1933)
Edward M. Beers	Republican	Pennsylvania (18th district)	April 21, 1932	54	Influenza	Washington, D.C.	Odd Fellows' Cemetery, Mount Union, Pennsylvania	Joseph F. Biddle	March 4, 1923	May 27, 1877	Nossville, Pennsylvania	72nd (1931–1933)
Edward E. Eslick	Democratic	Tennessee (7th district)	June 14, 1932	60	Heart attack	Washington, D.C.	Maplewood Cemetery, Pulaski, Tennessee	Willa Eslick	March 4, 1925	April 19, 1872	Giles County, Tennessee	72nd (1931–1933)
Henry St. George Tucker	Democratic	Virginia (10th district)	July 23, 1932	79	Coronary occlusion, uremia	Lexington, Virginia	Presbyterian Cemetery	Joel W. Flood	March 21, 1922 (previously served March 4, 1889 – March 3, 1897)	April 5, 1853	Winchester, Virginia	72nd (1931–1933)
Charles W. Waterman	Republican	Colorado (Senator)	August 27, 1932	70	Unknown	Washington, D.C.	Cedar Hill Cemetery, Suitland, Maryland	Walter Walker	March 4, 1927	November 2, 1861	Waitsfield, Vermont	72nd (1931–1933)
John Charles Linthicum	Democratic	Maryland (4th district)	October 5, 1932	64	Abscess surgery complications	Linthicum, Maryland	Druid Ridge Cemetery, Baltimore, Maryland	Ambrose Jerome Kennedy	March 4, 1911	November 26, 1867	Baltimore, Maryland	72nd (1931–1933)
Charles A. Karch	Democratic	Illinois (22nd district)	November 6, 1932	57	Lobar pneumonia, gall stones	St. Louis, Missouri	Mount Hope Cemetery, Belleville, Illinois	Edwin M. Schaefer	March 4, 1931	March 17, 1875	Engelmann Township, St. Clair County, Illinois	72nd (1931–1933)
Wesley Livsey Jones	Republican	Washington (Senator)	November 19, 1932	69	Unspecified heart issues related to kidney issues	Seattle, Washington	Bonney–Watson Mortuary, Seattle, Washington	Elijah S. Grammer	March 4, 1909 (U.S. House tenure March 4, 1899 – March 3, 1909)	October 9, 1863	Bethany, Illinois	72nd (1931–1933)
James C. McLaughlin	Republican	Michigan (9th district)	November 29, 1932	74	Heart failure	Marion, Virginia	Evergreen Cemetery, Muskegon, Michigan	Harry W. Musselwhite	March 4, 1907	January 26, 1858	Beardstown, Illinois	72nd (1931–1933)
Daniel E. Garrett	Democratic	Texas (8th district)	December 13, 1932	63	Heart disease	Washington, D.C.	Forest Park Cemetery, Houston, Texas	Joe H. Eagle	March 4, 1921 (previously served March 4, 1913 – March 3, 1915 and March 4, 1917 – March 3, 1919)	April 28, 1869	Springfield, Tennessee	72nd (1931–1933)
Robert R. Butler	Republican	Oregon (2nd district)	January 7, 1933	51	Heart failure	Washington, D.C.	Odd Fellows Cemetery, The Dalles, Oregon	Walter M. Pierce	November 6, 1928	September 24, 1881	Butler, Tennessee	72nd (1931–1933)
Samuel A. Kendall	Republican	Pennsylvania (24th district)	January 8, 1933	73	Self-inflicted gunshot wound	Washington, D.C.	Hochstetler Cemetery, Greenville Township, Somerset County, Pennsylvania	J. Buell Snyder	March 4, 1919	November 1, 1859	Greenville Township, Somerset County, Pennsylvania	72nd (1931–1933)
Godfrey G. Goodwin	Republican	Minnesota (10th district)	February 16, 1933	60	Fall from hotel window	Washington, D.C.	Lakewood Cemetery, Minneapolis, Minnesota	District abolished	March 4, 1925	January 11, 1873	St. Peter, Minnesota	72nd (1931–1933)
Thomas J. Walsh	Democratic	Montana (Senator)	March 2, 1933	73	Heart attack	Wilson, North Carolina	Resurrection Cemetery, Helena, Montana	John E. Erickson	March 4, 1913	June 12, 1859	Two Rivers, Wisconsin	72nd (1931–1933)
Robert B. Howell	Republican	Nebraska (Senator)	March 11, 1933	69	Pneumonia	Washington, D.C.	Forest Lawn Memorial Park, Omaha, Nebraska	William H. Thompson	March 4, 1923	January 21, 1864	Adrian, Michigan	73rd (1933–1935)
Clay Stone Briggs	Democratic	Texas (7th district)	April 29, 1933	57	Heart attack	Washington D.C.	Oakwood Cemetery, Syracuse, New York	Clark W. Thompson	March 4, 1919	January 8, 1876	Galveston, Texas	73rd (1933–1935)
Charles Hillyer Brand	Democratic	Georgia (10th district)	May 17, 1933	72	Unknown	Athens, Georgia	Shadow Lawn Cemetery, Lawrenceville, Georgia	Paul Brown	March 4, 1917	April 20, 1861	Loganville, Georgia	73rd (1933–1935)
Bolivar E. Kemp	Democratic	Louisiana (6th district)	June 19, 1933	61	Heart attack	Amite, Louisiana	Amite Cemetery, Amite, Louisiana	Jared Y. Sanders Jr.	March 4, 1925	December 28, 1871	St. Helena Parish, Louisiana	73rd (1933–1935)
Edward B. Almon	Democratic	Alabama (8th district)	June 22, 1933	73	Heart attack	Washington, D.C.	Oakwood Cemetery, Tuscumbia, Alabama	Archibald Hill Carmichael	March 4, 1915	April 18, 1860	Moulton, Alabama	73rd (1933–1935)
Henry Winfield Watson	Republican	Pennsylvania (9th district)	August 27, 1933	77	Chronic endocarditis	Langhorne, Pennsylvania	Wilmington and Brandywine Cemetery, Wilmington, Delaware	Oliver W. Frey	March 4, 1915	June 24, 1856	Bucks County, Pennsylvania	73rd (1933–1935)
Lynn Hornor	Democratic	West Virginia (3rd district)	September 23, 1933	58	Unspecified heart issues	Washington, D.C.	Odd Fellows Cemetery, Clarksburg, West Virginia	Andrew Edmiston Jr.	March 4, 1931	November 3, 1874	Clarksburg, West Virginia	73rd (1933–1935)
Porter H. Dale	Republican	Vermont (Senator)	October 6, 1933	66	Myocarditis	Westmore, Vermont	Lakeside Cemetery, Island Pond, Vermont	Ernest W. Gibson	November 7, 1923 (U.S. House tenure March 4, 1915 – August 11, 1923)	March 1, 1867	Island Pond, Vermont	73rd (1933–1935)
John B. Kendrick	Democratic	Wyoming (Senator)	November 3, 1933	76	Unknown	Sheridan, Wyoming	Mount Hope Cemetery, Sheridan, Wyoming	Joseph C. O'Mahoney	March 4, 1917	September 6, 1857	Rusk, Texas	73rd (1933–1935)
John D. Clarke	Republican	New York (34th district)	November 5, 1933	60	Car accident	Delhi, New York	Locust Hill Cemetery, Hobart, New York	Marian W. Clarke	March 4, 1927 (previously served March 4, 1921 – March 3, 1925)	January 15, 1873	Hobart, New York	73rd (1933–1935)
James S. Parker	Republican	New York (29th district)	December 19, 1933	66	Paralysis	Washington, D.C.	Evergreen Cemetery, Salem, New York	William D. Thomas	March 4, 1913	June 3, 1867	Great Barrington, Massachusetts	73rd (1933–1935)
Joseph L. Hooper	Republican	Michigan (3rd district)	February 22, 1934	56	Heart attack	Washington, D.C.	Oak Hill Cemetery, Battle Creek, Michigan	Henry M. Kimball	August 18, 1925	December 22, 1877	Cleveland, Ohio	73rd (1933–1935)
Edward W. Pou	Democratic	North Carolina (4th district)	April 1, 1934	70	Heart attack, preceded by influenza	Washington, D.C.	Riverside Cemetery, Smithfield, North Carolina	Harold D. Cooley	March 4, 1901	September 9, 1863	Tuskegee, Alabama	73rd (1933–1935)
George F. Brumm	Republican	Pennsylvania (13th district)	May 29, 1934	54	Chronic myocarditis, chronic nephritis, hypertension	Philadelphia, Pennsylvania	Charles Baber Cemetery, Pottsville, Pennsylvania	James H. Gildea	March 4, 1929 (previously served March 4, 1923 – March 3, 1927)	January 24, 1880	Minersville, Pennsylvania	73rd (1933–1935)
Thomas C. Coffin	Democratic	Idaho (2nd district)	June 8, 1934	46	Car accident	Washington, D.C.	Mountain View Cemetery, Pottsville, Pennsylvania	D. Worth Clark	March 4, 1933	October 25, 1887	Caldwell, Idaho Territory	73rd (1933–1935)
Henry Thomas Rainey	Democratic	Illinois (20th district)	August 19, 1934	73	Heart attack	St. Louis, Missouri	Carrollton City Cemetery, Carrollton, Illinois	Scott W. Lucas	March 4, 1923 (previously served March 4, 1903 – March 3, 1921)	August 20, 1860	Carrollton, Illinois	73rd (1933–1935)
Anthony J. Griffin	Democratic	New York (22nd district)	January 13, 1935	68	Unknown	New York City, New York	Arlington National Cemetery, Arlington, Virginia	Edward W. Curley	March 5, 1918	April 1, 1866	New York City, New York	74th (1935–1937)
Bronson M. Cutting	Republican	New Mexico (Senator)	May 6, 1935	46	Plane crash	New York City, New York	Greenwood Cemetery, Brooklyn, New York	Dennis Chavez	March 4, 1929 (previously served December 29, 1927 – December 6, 1928)	June 23, 1888	Great River, New York	74th (1935–1937)
Cap R. Carden	Democratic	Kentucky (4th district)	June 13, 1935	68	Pneumonia	Louisville, Kentucky	Munfordville Cemetery, Munfordville, Kentucky	Edward W. Creal	March 4, 1931	December 17, 1866	Munfordville, Kentucky	74th (1935–1937)
Charles V. Truax	Democratic	Ohio (at-large)	August 9, 1935	48	Heart attack	Washington, D.C.	Pleasant View Cemetery, Sycamore, Ohio	Daniel S. Earhart	March 4, 1933	February 1, 1887	Sycamore, Ohio	74th (1935–1937)
Henry M. Kimball	Republican	Michigan (3rd district)	October 19, 1935	57	Apoplexy	Kalamazoo, Michigan	Cremated	Verner Main	January 3, 1935	August 27, 1878	Winnfield, Louisiana	74th (1935–1937)
Thomas D. Schall	Republican	Minnesota (Senator)	December 22, 1935	57	Car accident	Washington, D.C.	Lakewood Cemetery, Minneapolis, Minnesota	Elmer Austin Benson	March 4, 1925 (U.S. House tenure March 4, 1915 – March 3, 1925)	June 4, 1878	Reed City, Michigan	74th (1935–1937)
Wesley Lloyd	Democratic	Washington (6th district)	January 10, 1936	52	Heart attack	Washington, D.C.	Tacoma Cemetery, Tacoma, Washington	John M. Coffee	March 4, 1933	July 24, 1883	Arvonia, Kansas	74th (1935–1937)
Stephen A. Rudd	Democratic	New York (9th district)	March 31, 1936	61	Heart disease	Brooklyn, New York	Evergreen Cemetery, Brooklyn, New York	Eugene J. Keogh	February 17, 1931	December 11, 1874	Brooklyn, New York	74th (1935–1937)
John T. Buckbee	Republican	Illinois (12th district)	April 23, 1936	64	Heart disease	Rockford, Illinois	Greenwood Cemetery, Rockford, Illinois	Noah M. Mason	March 4, 1927	August 1, 1871	Rockford, Illinois	74th (1935–1937)
Park Trammell	Democratic	Florida (Senator)	May 8, 1936	60	Cerebral hemorrhage	Washington, D.C.	Roselawn Cemetery, Lakeland, Florida	Scott M. Loftin	March 4, 1917	April 9, 1876	Macon County, Alabama	74th (1935–1937)
William D. Thomas	Republican	New York (29th district)	May 17, 1936	56	Unspecified heart issues	Washington, D.C.	Maple Grove Cemetery, Hoosick Falls, New York	E. Harold Cluett	January 30, 1934	March 22, 1880	Granville, New York	74th (1935–1937)
Randolph Perkins	Republican	New Jersey (7th district)	May 25, 1936	64	Unspecified kidney infection	Washington, D.C.	Fairview Cemetery, Staten Island, New York	J. Parnell Thomas	March 4, 1921	November 30, 1871	Dunellen, New Jersey	74th (1935–1937)
A. Piatt Andrew	Republican	Massachusetts (6th district)	June 3, 1936	63	Influenza	Gloucester, Massachusetts	Cremated	George J. Bates	September 27, 1921	February 12, 1873	La Porte, Indiana	74th (1935–1937)
Joseph W. Byrns Sr.	Democratic	Tennessee (5th district)	June 4, 1936	66	Cerebral hemorrhage	Washington, D.C.	Mount Olivet Cemetery, Nashville, Tennessee	Richard Merrill Atkinson	March 4, 1909	July 20, 1869	Cedar Hill, Tennessee	74th (1935–1937)
Duncan U. Fletcher	Democratic	Florida (Senator)	June 17, 1936	77	Heart attack	Washington, D.C.	Evergreen Cemetery, Jacksonville, Florida	William Luther Hill	March 4, 1909	January 6, 1859	Americus, Georgia	74th (1935–1937)
Bernhard M. Jacobsen	Democratic	Iowa (2nd district)	June 30, 1936	74	Unknown	Rochester, Minnesota	Springdale Cemetery, Clinton, Iowa	William S. Jacobsen	March 4, 1931	March 26, 1862	Tonder, New York	74th (1935–1937)
Warren J. Duffey	Democratic	Ohio (9th district)	July 7, 1936	50	Unspecified liver issues	Toledo, Ohio	Calvary Cemetery, Ohio	John F. Hunter	March 4, 1933	January 24, 1886	Toledo, Ohio	74th (1935–1937)
Richard L. Murphy	Democratic	Iowa (Senator)	July 16, 1936	60	Car accident	Chippewa Falls, Wisconsin	Mount Olivet Cemetery, Key West, Iowa	Guy Gillette	March 4, 1933	November 6, 1875	Dubuque, Iowa	74th (1935–1937)
John J. McSwain	Democratic	South Carolina (4th district)	August 6, 1936	61	Coronary occlusion	Cross Hill, South Carolina	Springwood Cemetery, Greenville, South Carolina	Gabriel H. Mahon Jr.	March 4, 1921	May 1, 1875	Cross Hill, South Carolina	74th (1935–1937)
Marion Zioncheck	Democratic	Washington (1st district)	August 7, 1936	34	Suicide by jumping out a window	Seattle, Washington	Evergreen Cemetery, Seattle, Washington	Warren G. Magnuson	March 4, 1933	December 5, 1901	Boston, Massachusetts	74th (1935–1937)
William Voris Gregory	Democratic	Kentucky (1st district)	October 10, 1936	58	Unspecified kidney issues	Washington, D.C.	Maplewood Cemetery, Mayfield, Kentucky	Noble Jones Gregory	March 4, 1927	October 21, 1877	Graves County, Kentucky	74th (1935–1937)
James J. Couzens	Republican	Michigan (Senator)	October 22, 1936	64	Heart attack	Detroit, Michigan	Woodlawn Cemetery, Detroit, Michigan	Prentiss M. Brown	November 29, 1922	August 26, 1872	Chatham, Ontario, Canada	74th (1935–1937)
Glover H. Cary	Democratic	Kentucky (2nd district)	December 5, 1936	51	Pneumonia	Cincinnati, Ohio	Calhoun Cemetery, Calhoun, Kentucky	Beverly M. Vincent	March 4, 1931	May 1, 1885	Calhoun, Kentucky	74th (1935–1937)
Peter Norbeck	Republican	South Dakota (Senator)	December 20, 1936	66	Unspecified cancer	Redfield, South Dakota	Calhoun Cemetery, Calhoun, Kentucky	Herbert E. Hitchcock	March 4, 1921	August 27, 1870	Clay County, South Dakota	74th (1935–1937)
Andrew Jackson Montague	Democratic	Virginia (3rd district)	January 24, 1937	74	Heart attack	Urbanna, Virginia	Christ Church Episcopal Cemetery, Urbanna, Virginia	Dave E. Satterfield Jr.	March 4, 1913	October 3, 1862	Campbell County, Virginia	75th (1937–1939)
James P. Buchanan	Democratic	Texas (10th district)	February 22, 1937	69	Heart attack	Washington, D.C.	Prairie Lea Cemetery, Brenham, Texas	Lyndon B. Johnson	April 15, 1913	April 30, 1867	Midway, South Carolina	75th (1937–1939)
Henry E. Stubbs	Democratic	California (10th district)	February 28, 1937	55	Pneumonia	Washington, D.C.	Santa Maria Cemetery, Santa Maria, California	Alfred J. Elliott	March 4, 1933	March 4, 1881	Nampa, Texas	75th (1937–1939)
Benjamin K. Focht	Republican	Pennsylvania (18th district)	March 27, 1937	74	Angina pectoris	Washington, D.C.	Lewisburg Cemetery, Lewisburg, Pennsylvania	Richard M. Simpson	March 4, 1933 (previously served March 4, 1907 – March 3, 1913 and March 4, 1915 – March 3, 1923)	March 12, 1863	New Bloomfield, Pennsylvania	75th (1937–1939)
Nathan L. Bachman	Democratic	Tennessee (Senator)	April 23, 1937	58	Unspecified cancer	Washington, D.C.	Forest Hills Cemetery, Chattanooga, Tennessee	George L. Berry	March 4, 1933	August 2, 1878	Chattanooga, Tennessee	75th (1937–1939)
Philip A. Goodwin	Republican	New York (27th district)	June 6, 1937	55	Unknown	Coxsackie, New York	Riverside Cemetery, Coxsackie, New York	Lewis K. Rockefeller	March 4, 1933	January 20, 1882	Athens, New York	75th (1937–1939)
William P. Connery Jr.	Democratic	Massachusetts (7th district)	June 15, 1937	48	Unspecified food poisoning	Washington, D.C.	St. Mary's Cemetery, Lynn, New York	Lawrence J. Connery	March 4, 1923	August 24, 1888	Lynn, Massachusetts	75th (1937–1939)
Joseph Taylor Robinson	Democratic	Arkansas (Senator)	July 14, 1937	64	Cancer	Washington, D.C.	Roselawn Cemetery, Little Rock, Arkansas	Samuel M. Taylor	March 10, 1913 (U.S. House tenure March 4, 1903 - January 14, 1913)	August 26, 1872	Lonoke, Arkansas	75th (1937–1939)
Theodore A. Peyser	Democratic	New York (17th district)	August 8, 1937	64	Unknown	New York City, New York	United Cemetery, Cincinnati, Ohio	Bruce Fairchild Barton	March 4, 1933	February 18, 1873	Charleston, West Virginia	75th (1937–1939)
Robert P. Hill	Democratic	Oklahoma (5th district)	October 29, 1937	63	Unknown	Oklahoma City, Oklahoma	Memorial Park Cemetery, Oklahoma City, Oklahoma	Gomer G. Smith	January 3, 1937 (previously served March 4, 1913 – March 3, 1915)	April 18, 1874	Ewing, Illinois	75th (1937–1939)
Edward Aloysius Kenney	Democratic	New Jersey (9th district)	January 27, 1938	53	Fall from window	Washington, D.C.	St. John's Cemetery, Clinton, Massachusetts	Frank C. Osmers Jr.	March 4, 1933	August 11, 1884	Clinton, Massachusetts	75th (1937–1939)
Charles J. Colden	Democratic	California (17th district)	April 15, 1938	67	Unspecified cancer	Washington, D.C.	Green Hills Memorial Park, Los Angeles, California	Lee E. Geyer	March 4, 1933	August 24, 1870	Peoria County, Illinois	75th (1937–1939)
Royal S. Copeland	Democratic	New York (Senator)	June 17, 1938	69	Unspecified cancer	Washington, D.C.	Mahwah Cemetery, Mahwah, New Jersey	James M. Mead	March 4, 1923	November 7, 1868	Dexter, Michigan	75th (1937–1939)
Allard H. Gasque	Democratic	South Carolina (6th district)	June 17, 1938	65	Unspecified heart issues	Washington, D.C.	Mount Hope Cemetery, Florence, South Carolina	Elizabeth Hawley Gasque	March 4, 1923	March 8, 1873	Hyman, South Carolina	75th (1937–1939)
Robert L. Bacon	Republican	New York (1st district)	September 12, 1938	54	Heart attack	Lake Success, New York	Arlington National Cemetery, Arlington, Virginia	Leonard W. Hall	March 4, 1923	July 23, 1884	Boston, Massachusetts	75th (1937–1939)
John J. Boylan	Democratic	New York (15th district)	October 5, 1938	60	Unknown	New York City, New York	Calvary Cemetery, Queens, New York	Michael J. Kennedy	March 4, 1923	September 20, 1878	New York City, New York	75th (1937–1939)
Stephen Warfield Gambrill	Democratic	Maryland (5th district)	December 19, 1938	65	Heart attack	Washington, D.C.	Cedar Hill Cemetery, Washington, D.C.	Lansdale Ghiselin Sasscer	November 4, 1924	October 2, 1873	Savage, Maryland	75th (1937–1939)
William B. Cravens	Democratic	Arkansas (4th district)	January 13, 1939	66	Unknown	Washington, D.C.	Oak Cemetery, Fort Smith, Arkansas	William F. Cravens	March 4, 1933 (previously served March 4, 1907 – March 3, 1913)	January 17, 1872	Savage, Maryland	76th (1939–1941)
J. Burrwood Daly	Democratic	Pennsylvania (4th district)	March 12, 1939	67	Bronchial pneumonia; Unspecified chronic heart disease, "congestive failure"	Philadelphia, Pennsylvania	St. Denis Cemetery, South Ardmore, Pennsylvania	John E. Sheridan	January 3, 1935	February 13, 1872	Philadelphia, Pennsylvania	76th (1939–1941)
Clarence W. Turner	Democratic	Tennessee (6th district)	March 23, 1939	72	Heart attack	Washington, D.C.	Marable Cemetery, Waverly, Tennessee	W. Wirt Courtney	March 4, 1933 (previously served November 7, 1922 – March 3, 1923)	October 22, 1866	Humphreys County, Tennessee	76th (1939–1941)
J. Hamilton Lewis	Democratic	Illinois (Senator)	April 9, 1939	75	Cardiac asthma	Washington, D.C.	Fort Lincoln Cemetery, Brentwood, Maryland	James M. Slattery	March 4, 1931 (U.S. House tenure March 4, 1897 – March 3, 1899/previously served March 26, 1913 – March 3, 1919)	May 18, 1863	Danville, Virginia	76th (1939–1941)
Bert Lord	Republican	New York (34th district)	May 24, 1939	69	Heart attack	Washington, D.C.	Glenwood Cemetery, Afton, New York	Edwin Arthur Hall	January 3, 1935	December 4, 1869	Sanford, New York	76th (1939–1941)
Emmett Marshall Owen	Democratic	Georgia (4th district)	June 21, 1939	61	Heart attack	Washington, D.C.	East View Cemetery, Zebulon, Georgia	A. Sidney Camp	March 4, 1933	October 19, 1877	Hollonville, Georgia	76th (1939–1941)
Harry W. Griswold	Republican	Wisconsin (3rd district)	July 4, 1939	53	Heart attack	Washington, D.C.	Hamilton Cemetery, West Salem, Wisconsin	William H. Stevenson	January 3, 1939	May 19, 1886	West Salem, Wisconsin	76th (1939–1941)
Samuel Davis McReynolds	Democratic	Tennessee (3rd district)	July 11, 1939	67	Unspecified heart disease	Washington, D.C.	U.S.	Estes Kefauver	March 4, 1923	April 16, 1872	Pikeville, Tennessee	76th (1939–1941)
Thomas M. Eaton	Republican	California (18th district)	September 16, 1939	43	Pleurisy, unspecific liver condition	Long Beach, California	U.S.	William Ward Johnson	January 3, 1939	August 3, 1896	Edwardsville, Illinois	76th (1939–1941)
Thomas S. McMillan	Democratic	South Carolina (1st district)	September 29, 1939	50	Coronary occlusion	Charleston, South Carolina	U.S.	Clara Gooding McMillan	March 4, 1925	November 27, 1888	Ulmer, South Carolina	76th (1939–1941)
M. M. Logan	Democratic	Kentucky (Senator)	October 3, 1939	65	Unspecified heart issues	Washington, D.C.	U.S.	Happy Chandler	March 4, 1931	January 7, 1874	Brownsville, Kentucky	76th (1939–1941)
Chester C. Bolton	Republican	Ohio (22nd district)	October 29, 1939	57	Unspecified heart issues	Cleveland, Ohio	U.S.	Frances P. Bolton	January 3, 1939 (previously served March 4, 1929 – January 3, 1937)	September 5, 1882	Cleveland, Ohio	76th (1939–1941)
J. Will Taylor	Republican	Tennessee (2nd district)	November 14, 1939	59	Heart attack	La Follette, Tennessee	U.S.	John Jennings Jr.	March 4, 1919	August 28, 1880	Union County, Tennessee	76th (1939–1941)
Santiago Iglesias	Socialist	Puerto Rico (Resident Commissioner)	December 5, 1939	67	Unknown	Washington, D.C.	Santa Maria Magdalena de Pazzis Cemetery, San Juan, Puerto Rico	Bolívar Pagán	March 4, 1933	February 22, 1872	A Coruña, Galicia, Spain	76th (1939–1941)
Carl E. Mapes	Republican	Michigan (5th district)	December 12, 1939	64	Heart attack	New Orleans, Louisiana	U.S.	Bartel J. Jonkman	March 4, 1913	December 26, 1874	Kalamo, Michigan	76th (1939–1941)
William I. Sirovich	Democratic	New York (14th district)	December 17, 1939	57	Heart attack	New York City, New York	U.S.	Morris Michael Edelstein	March 4, 1927	March 18, 1882	York County, Pennsylvania	76th (1939–1941)
John Andrew Martin	Democratic	Colorado (3rd district)	December 23, 1939	71	Heart attack	Washington, D.C.	U.S.	William E. Burney	March 4, 1933 (previously served March 4, 1909 – March 3, 1913)	April 10, 1868	Cincinnati, Ohio	76th (1939–1941)

== 1940s ==
Member	Party	State (district)	Date of death	Age at death (years)	Cause	Place of death	Place of burial	Successor	Serving since (in the House/Senate)	Date of birth	Place of birth	U.S. Congress
William A. Ashbrook	Democratic	Ohio (17th district)	January 1, 1940	72	paralytic stroke	Washington, D.C.	U.S.	J. Harry McGregor	January 3, 1935 (previously served March 4, 1907 – March 3, 1921)	July 1, 1867	Johnstown, Ohio	76th (1939–1941)
George H. Heinke	Republican	Nebraska (1st district)	January 2, 1940	57	fatal car crash	Morrilton, Arkansas	U.S.	John Hyde Sweet	January 3, 1939	July 22, 1882	Dunbar, Nebraska	76th (1939–1941)
Wallace E. Pierce	Republican	New York (31st district)	January 3, 1940	58	Heart attack	Washington, D.C.	U.S.	Clarence E. Kilburn	January 3, 1939	December 9, 1881	Black Brook, New York	76th (1939–1941)
Edward W. Curley	Democratic	New York (22nd district)	January 6, 1940	66	Heart attack	New York City, New York	U.S.	Walter A. Lynch	November 5, 1935	May 23, 1873	Easton, Pennsylvania	76th (1939–1941)
William E. Borah	Republican	Idaho (Senator)	January 19, 1940	74	cerebral hemorrhage	Washington, D.C.	U.S.	John Thomas	March 4, 1907	June 29, 1865	Fairfield, Illinois	76th (1939–1941)
Cassius C. Dowell	Republican	Iowa (6th district)	February 4, 1940	75	heart disease	Washington, D.C.	U.S.	Robert K. Goodwin	January 3, 1937 (previously served March 4, 1915 – January 3, 1935)	February 29, 1864	Summerset, Iowa	76th (1939–1941)
Clyde H. Smith	Republican	Maine (2nd district)	April 8, 1940	63	coronary thrombosis	Washington, D.C.	U.S.	Margaret Chase Smith	January 3, 1937	June 9, 1876	Somerset, Maine	76th (1939–1941)
Ernest W. Gibson	Republican	Vermont (Senator)	June 20, 1940	67	pneumonia and heart ailment	Washington, D.C.	U.S.	Ernest W. Gibson Jr.	November 21, 1933 (U.S. House tenure November 6, 1923 – October 19, 1933)	December 29, 1872	Londonderry, Vermont	76th (1939–1941)
W. Benjamin Gibbs	Democratic	Georgia (8th district)	August 7, 1940	51	Stroke	Washington, D.C.	U.S.	Florence R. Gibbs	January 3, 1939	April 15, 1889	Dupont, Georgia	76th (1939–1941)
George N. Seger	Republican	New Jersey (8th district)	August 26, 1940	74	heart ailment	Washington, D.C.	U.S.	Gordon Canfield	March 4, 1923	January 4, 1866	New York City, New York	76th (1939–1941)
Ernest Lundeen	Republican	Minnesota (Senator)	August 31, 1940	62	plane crash	Lovettsville, Virginia	U.S.	Joseph H. Ball	January 3, 1937 (U.S. House tenure March 4, 1917 – March 3, 1919 and March 4, 1933 – January 3, 1937)	August 4, 1878	Beresford, South Dakota	76th (1939–1941)
William B. Bankhead	Democratic	Alabama (7th district)	September 15, 1940	66	"ruptured artery in the abdomen"	Washington, D.C.	U.S.	Zadoc L. Weatherford	March 4, 1917	April 12, 1874	Lamar County, Alabama	76th (1939–1941)
Key Pittman	Democratic	Nevada (Senator)	November 10, 1940	68	heart attack	Reno, Nevada	U.S.	Berkeley L. Bunker	January 29, 1913	September 18, 1872	Vicksburg, Mississippi	76th (1939–1941)
Sam C. Massingale	Democratic	Oklahoma (7th district)	January 17, 1941	70	"heart failure precipitated by grippe"	Washington, D.C.	U.S.	Victor Wickersham	January 3, 1935	August 2, 1870	Quitman, Mississippi	77th (1941–1943)
Kenneth F. Simpson	Republican	New York (17th district)	January 25, 1941	45	heart attack	New York City, New York	U.S.	Joseph C. Baldwin	January 3, 1941	May 4, 1895	New York City, New York	77th (1941–1943)
William D. Byron	Democratic	Maryland (6th district)	February 27, 1941	45	plane crash	Atlanta, Georgia	U.S.	Katharine Byron	January 3, 1939	May 15, 1895	Danville, Virginia	77th (1941–1943)
Pius Schwert	Democratic	New York (42nd district)	March 11, 1941	48	heart attack	Washington, D.C.	U.S.	John Cornelius Butler	January 3, 1939	November 22, 1892	Angola, New York	77th (1941–1943)
Morris Sheppard	Democratic	Texas (Senator)	April 9, 1941	65	brain hemorrhage	Washington, D.C.	U.S.	Andrew J. Houston	February 3, 1913 (U.S. House tenure November 15, 1902 – February 3, 1913)	May 28, 1875	Morris County, Texas	77th (1941–1943)
Alonzo D. Folger	Democratic	North Carolina (5th district)	April 30, 1941	52	car accident	Mount Airy, North Carolina	U.S.	John H. Folger	January 3, 1939	July 9, 1888	Dobson, North Carolina	77th (1941–1943)
Morris M. Edelstein	Democratic	New York (14th district)	June 4, 1941	53	heart attack	Washington, D.C.	U.S.	Arthur G. Klein	February 6, 1940	February 5, 1888	New York City, New York, US	77th (1941–1943)
Pat Harrison	Democratic	Mississippi (Senator)	June 22, 1941	59	"from exhaustion following a major intestinal operation"	Washington, D.C.	U.S.	James Eastland	March 5, 1919 (U.S. House tenure March 4, 1911 – March 3, 1919)	August 29, 1881	Crystal Springs, Mississippi	77th (1941–1943)
Andrew J. Houston	Democratic	Texas (Senator)	June 26, 1941	87	"followed an operation for stomach ailment"	Baltimore, Maryland	U.S.	W. Lee O'Daniel	April 21, 1941	June 21, 1854	Independence, Texas	77th (1941–1943)
Stephen Bolles	Republican	Wisconsin (1st district)	July 8, 1941	75	heart ailment	Washington, D.C.	U.S.	Lawrence H. Smith	January 3, 1939	June 25, 1866	Springboro, Pennsylvania	77th (1941–1943)
Alva M. Lumpkin	Democratic	South Carolina (Senator)	August 1, 1941	54	gastric hemorrhage	Washington, D.C.	U.S.	Roger C. Peace	July 22, 1941	November 13, 1886	Milledgeville, Georgia	77th (1941–1943)
Albert G. Rutherford	Republican	Pennsylvania (15th district)	August 10, 1941	62	heart attack	Washington, D.C.	U.S.	Wilson D. Gillette	January 3, 1937	January 3, 1879	Watford, Ontario, Canada	77th (1941–1943)
Edward T. Taylor	Democratic	Colorado (4th district)	September 3, 1941	83	heart attack	Denver, Colorado	U.S.	Robert F. Rockwell	March 4, 1909	June 19, 1858	Metamora, Illinois	77th (1941–1943)
Lee E. Geyer	Democratic	California (17th district)	October 11, 1941	53	Bronchial pneumonia	Washington, D.C.	U.S.	Cecil R. King	January 3, 1939	September 9, 1888	Wetmore, Kansas	77th (1941–1943)
Lawrence J. Connery	Democratic	Massachusetts (7th district)	October 19, 1941	46	Heart attack	Arlington, Virginia	U.S.	Thomas J. Lane	September 28, 1937	October 17, 1895	Lynn, Massachusetts	77th (1941–1943)
Alva B. Adams	Democratic	Colorado (Senator)	December 1, 1941	66	myocardial infarction	Washington, D.C.	U.S.	Eugene D. Millikin	March 4, 1933 (previously served May 17, 1923 – November 30, 1924)	October 29, 1875	Del Norte, Colorado	77th (1941–1943)
Patrick J. Boland	Democratic	Pennsylvania (11th district)	May 18, 1942	62	coronary thrombosis (2 days) due to atherosclerosis (2 years)	Scranton, Pennsylvania	U.S.	Veronica Grace Boland	March 4, 1931	January 6, 1880	Scranton, Pennsylvania	77th (1941–1943)
Frank H. Buck	Democratic	California (3rd district)	September 17, 1942	54	Stroke	Washington, D.C.	U.S.	Justin L. Johnson	March 4, 1933	September 23, 1887	Vacaville, California	77th (1941–1943)
Philip Allen Bennett	Republican	Missouri (6th district)	December 7, 1942	61	heart attack	Washington, D.C.	U.S.	Marion T. Bennett	January 3, 1941	March 5, 1881	Buffalo, Missouri	77th (1941–1943)
Harry L. Englebright	Republican	California (2nd district)	May 13, 1943	59	heart disease	Bethesda, Maryland	U.S.	Clair Engle	August 31, 1926	January 2, 1884	Nevada City, California	78th (1943–1945)
Ulysses S. Guyer	Republican	Kansas (2nd district)	June 5, 1943	74	Unknown, undetermined, unavailable to public, or yet to be researched (as of April 19, 2019)	Bethesda, Maryland	U.S.	Errett P. Scrivner	March 4, 1927 (previously served November 4, 1924 – March 3, 1925)	December 13, 1868	Paw Paw, Illinois	78th (1943–1945)
Francis D. Culkin	Republican	New York (32nd district)	August 4, 1943	68	histoplasmosis	Oswego, New York	U.S.	Hadwen Carlton Fuller	November 6, 1928	November 10, 1874	Oswego, New York	78th (1943–1945)
Edward W. Creal	Democratic	Kentucky (4th district)	October 13, 1943	59	Stroke	Hodgenville, Kentucky	U.S.	Chester Carrier	November 5, 1935	November 20, 1883	LaRue County, Kentucky	78th (1943–1945)
J. William Ditter	Republican	Pennsylvania (17th district)	November 21, 1943	55	plane crash	Columbia, Pennsylvania	U.S.	Samuel K. McConnell Jr.	March 4, 1933	September 5, 1888	Philadelphia, Pennsylvania	78th (1943–1945)
William Warren Barbour	Republican	New Jersey (Senator)	November 22, 1943	55	cerebral hemorrhage	Washington, D.C.	U.S.	Arthur Walsh	November 9, 1938 (previously served December 1, 1931 – January 3, 1937)	July 31, 1888	Monmouth Beach, New Jersey	78th (1943–1945)
Henry B. Steagall	Democratic	Alabama (3rd district)	November 22, 1943	70	Unknown, undetermined, unavailable to public, or yet to be researched (as of April 19, 2019)	Washington, D.C.	U.S.	George W. Andrews	March 4, 1915	May 19, 1873	Clopton, Alabama	78th (1943–1945)
Lawrence Lewis	Democratic	Colorado (1st district)	December 9, 1943	64	Unknown, undetermined, unavailable to public, or yet to be researched (as of April 19, 2019)	Washington, D.C.	U.S.	Dean M. Gillespie	March 4, 1933	June 22, 1879	St. Louis, Missouri	78th (1943–1945)
William H. Wheat	Republican	Illinois (19th district)	January 16, 1944	64	Unknown, undetermined, unavailable to public, or yet to be researched (as of April 19, 2019)	Washington, D.C.	U.S.	Rolla C. McMillen	January 3, 1939	February 19, 1879	Kahoka, Missouri	78th (1943–1945)
Frederick Van Nuys	Democratic	Indiana (Senator)	January 25, 1944	69	Unknown, undetermined, unavailable to public, or yet to be researched (as of April 19, 2019)	Vienna, Virginia	U.S.	Samuel D. Jackson	March 4, 1933	April 16, 1874	Falmouth, Indiana	78th (1943–1945)
Leonard W. Schuetz	Democratic	Illinois (7th district)	February 13, 1944	56	Unknown, undetermined, unavailable to public, or yet to be researched (as of April 19, 2019)	Washington, D.C.	U.S.	William W. Link	March 4, 1931	November 16, 1887	Posen, Kentucky, US	78th (1943–1945)
Charles L. McNary	Republican	Oregon (Senator)	February 25, 1944	69	brain tumor	Fort Lauderdale, Florida	U.S.	Guy Cordon	December 18, 1918 (previously served May 29, 1917 – November 5, 1918)	June 12, 1874	Salem, Oregon	78th (1943–1945)
Thomas H. Cullen	Democratic	New York (4th district)	March 1, 1944	75	Unknown, undetermined, unavailable to public, or yet to be researched (as of April 19, 2019)	Washington, D.C.	U.S.	John J. Rooney	March 4, 1919	March 29, 1868	Brooklyn, New York	78th (1943–1945)
James A. O'Leary	Democratic	New York (11th district)	March 16, 1944	54	Unknown, undetermined, unavailable to public, or yet to be researched (as of April 19, 2019)	Staten Island, New York	U.S.	Ellsworth B. Buck	January 3, 1935	April 23, 1889	Staten Island, New York	78th (1943–1945)
Hampton P. Fulmer	Democratic	South Carolina (2nd district)	October 19, 1944	69	Unknown, undetermined, unavailable to public, or yet to be researched (as of April 19, 2019)	Washington, D.C.	U.S.	Willa L. Fulmer	March 4, 1921	February 3, 1875	Springfield, South Carolina	78th (1943–1945)
Ellison D. Smith	Democratic	South Carolina (Senator)	November 17, 1944	80	Unknown, undetermined, unavailable to public, or yet to be researched (as of April 19, 2019)	Lynchburg, South Carolina	U.S.	Wilton E. Hall	March 4, 1909	August 1, 1864	Lynchburg, South Carolina	78th (1943–1945)
James F. O'Connor	Democratic	Montana (2nd district)	January 15, 1945	66	Unknown, undetermined, unavailable to public, or yet to be researched (as of April 19, 2019)	Washington, D.C.	U.S.	Wesley A. D'Ewart	January 3, 1937	May 7, 1878	California Junction, Iowa	79th (1945–1947)
Francis T. Maloney	Democratic	Connecticut (Senator)	January 16, 1945	50	Unknown, undetermined, unavailable to public, or yet to be researched (as of April 19, 2019)	Meriden, Connecticut	U.S.	Thomas C. Hart	January 3, 1935 (U.S. House tenure March 4, 1933 – January 3, 1935)	March 31, 1894	Meriden, Connecticut	79th (1945–1947)
John Moses	Democratic	North Dakota (Senator)	March 3, 1945	59	died during open heart surgery	Rochester, Minnesota	U.S.	Milton Young	January 3, 1945	June 12, 1885	Strand, Minnesota, US	79th (1945–1947)
James V. Heidinger	Democratic	Illinois (24th district)	March 22, 1945	62	pulmonary fibrosis	Phoenix, Arizona	U.S.	Roy Clippinger	January 3, 1941	July 17, 1882	Mount Erie, Illinois	79th (1945–1947)
James G. Scrugham	Democratic	Nevada (Senator)	June 23, 1945	65	Unknown, undetermined, unavailable to public, or yet to be researched (as of April 19, 2019)	San Diego, California	U.S.	Edward P. Carville	December 7, 1942 (U.S. House tenure March 4, 1933 – December 7, 1942)	January 19, 1880	Lexington, Kentucky	79th (1945–1947)
Hiram Johnson	Republican	California (Senator)	August 6, 1945	78	Unknown, undetermined, unavailable to public, or yet to be researched (as of April 19, 2019)	Bethesda, Maryland	U.S.	William F. Knowland	March 16, 1917	September 2, 1866	Sacramento, California	79th (1945–1947)
John Thomas	Republican	Idaho (Senator)	November 10, 1945	71	cerebral hemorrhage	Washington, D.C.	U.S.	Charles C. Gossett	January 27, 1940 (previously served June 30, 1928 – March 3, 1933)	January 4, 1874	Phillips County, Kansas	79th (1945–1947)
James W. Mott	Republican	Oregon (1st district)	November 12, 1945	62	Unknown, undetermined, unavailable to public, or yet to be researched (as of April 19, 2019)	Bethesda, Maryland	U.S.	A. Walter Norblad	March 4, 1933	November 12, 1883	New Washington, Pennsylvania	79th (1945–1947)
Joseph W. Ervin	Democratic	North Carolina (10th district)	December 25, 1945	44	committed suicide	Washington, D.C.	U.S.	Sam Ervin	January 3, 1945	March 3, 1901	Morganton, North Carolina	79th (1945–1947)
J. Buell Snyder	Democratic	Pennsylvania (23rd district)	February 24, 1946	69	Unknown, undetermined, unavailable to public, or yet to be researched (as of April 19, 2019)	Pittsburgh, Pennsylvania	U.S.	Carl H. Hoffman	March 4, 1933	July 30, 1877	Upper Turkeyfoot Township, Pennsylvania	79th (1945–1947)
William O. Burgin	Democratic	North Carolina (8th district)	April 11, 1946	69	Unknown, undetermined, unavailable to public, or yet to be researched (as of April 19, 2019)	Washington, D.C.	U.S.	Eliza Pratt	January 3, 1939	July 28, 1877	Marion, North Carolina	79th (1945–1947)
Carter Glass	Democratic	Virginia (Senator)	May 28, 1946	88	congestive heart failure	Washington, D.C.	U.S.	Thomas G. Burch	February 20, 1920 (U.S. House tenure November 4, 1902 – December 16, 1918)	January 4, 1858	Lynchburg, Virginia	79th (1945–1947)
John H. Bankhead II	Democratic	Alabama (Senator)	June 12, 1946	73	stroke	Bethesda, Maryland	U.S.	George R. Swift	March 4, 1931	July 8, 1872	Old Moscow, Alabama	79th (1945–1947)
William Gallagher	Democratic	Minnesota (3rd district)	August 13, 1946	71	liver ailment	Rochester, Minnesota	U.S.	George MacKinnon	January 3, 1945	May 13, 1875	Minneapolis, Minnesota	79th (1945–1947)
Charles O. Andrews	Democratic	Florida (Senator)	September 18, 1946	69	"acute heart attack"	Washington, D.C.	U.S.	Spessard Holland	November 4, 1936	March 7, 1877	Ponce de Leon, Florida	79th (1945–1947)
William B. Barry	Democratic	New York (4th district)	October 20, 1946	44	pneumonia	Queens, New York	U.S.	Gregory McMahon	November 5, 1935	July 21, 1902	Concord, New Hampshire	79th (1945–1947)
Robert K. Henry	Republican	Wisconsin (2nd district)	November 20, 1946	56	Unknown, undetermined, unavailable to public, or yet to be researched (as of April 19, 2019)	Madison, Wisconsin	U.S.	Glenn Robert Davis	January 3, 1945	February 9, 1890	Jefferson, Wisconsin	79th (1945–1947)
Josiah Bailey	Democratic	North Carolina (Senator)	December 15, 1946	73	cerebral hemorrhage, due to arterial hypertension and arterial sclerosis	Raleigh, North Carolina	U.S.	William B. Umstead	March 4, 1931	September 14, 1873	Warrenton, North Carolina	79th (1945–1947)
Fred B. Norman	Republican	Washington (3rd district)	April 18, 1947	65	heart attack	Washington, D.C.	U.S.	Russell Vernon Mack	January 3, 1947 (previously served January 3, 1943 – January 3, 1945)	March 21, 1882	Martinsville, Illinois	80th (1947–1949)
Charles L. Gerlach	Republican	Pennsylvania (8th district)	May 5, 1947	51	immediate: congestive heart failure, coronary thrombosis; due to coronary sclerosis	Allentown, Pennsylvania	U.S.	Franklin H. Lichtenwalter	January 3, 1939	September 14, 1895	Bethlehem, Pennsylvania	80th (1947–1949)
Frederick Van Ness Bradley	Republican	Michigan (11th district)	May 24, 1947	49	heart attack	New London, Connecticut	U.S.	Charles E. Potter	January 3, 1939	April 12, 1898	Chicago, Illinois	80th (1947–1949)
Joseph J. Mansfield	Democratic	Texas (9th district)	July 12, 1947	86	arteriosclerosis	Bethesda, Maryland	U.S.	Clark W. Thompson	March 4, 1917	February 9, 1861	Wayne, West Virginia	80th (1947–1949)
Theodore G. Bilbo	Democratic	Mississippi (Senator)	August 21, 1947	69	cancer of the mouth, later "complicated by inflammation of the nerves, partial paralysis and a blood clot on the lung"	New Orleans, Louisiana	U.S.	John C. Stennis	January 3, 1935	October 13, 1877	Pearl River County, Mississippi	80th (1947–1949)
Charles L. Gifford	Republican	Massachusetts (9th district)	August 23, 1947	76	Unknown, undetermined, unavailable to public, or yet to be researched (as of April 19, 2019)	Cotuit, Massachusetts	U.S.	Donald W. Nicholson	November 7, 1922	March 15, 1871	Cotuit, Massachusetts	80th (1947–1949)
Raymond S. Springer	Republican	Indiana (10th district)	August 28, 1947	65	myocardial failure due to coronary thrombosis	Connersville, Indiana	U.S.	Ralph Harvey	January 3, 1939	April 26, 1882	Indianapolis, Indiana	80th (1947–1949)
Patrick H. Drewry	Democratic	Virginia (4th district)	December 21, 1947	72	acute congestive heart failure	Petersburg, Virginia	U.S.	Watkins M. Abbitt	April 27, 1920	May 24, 1875	Petersburg, Virginia	80th (1947–1949)
John M. Robsion	Republican	Kentucky (9th district)	February 17, 1948	75	coronary occlusion due to coronary sclerosis and generalized arteriosclerosis; influenza four days	Barbourville, Kentucky	U.S.	William Lewis	January 3, 1935 (previously served March 4, 1919 – January 10, 1930/U.S. Senate tenure January 11, 1930 – November 30, 1930)	January 2, 1873	Berlin, Kentucky	80th (1947–1949)
Orville Zimmerman	Democratic	Missouri (10th district)	April 7, 1948	67	heart attack	Washington, D.C.	U.S.	Paul C. Jones	January 3, 1935	December 31, 1880	Glenallen, Missouri	80th (1947–1949)
John H. Overton	Democratic	Louisiana (Senator)	May 14, 1948	72	following abdominal operation	Bethesda, Maryland	U.S.	William C. Feazel	March 4, 1933 (U.S. House tenure May 12, 1931 – March 3, 1933)	September 17, 1875	Marksville, Louisiana	80th (1947–1949)
Thomas L. Owens	Republican	Illinois (7th district)	June 7, 1948	50	Heart attack	Bethesda, Maryland	U.S.	Adolph J. Sabath	January 3, 1947	December 21, 1897	Chicago, Illinois	80th (1947–1949)
Harlan J. Bushfield	Republican	South Dakota (Senator)	September 27, 1948	66	cerebral hemorrhage	Miller, South Dakota	U.S.	Vera C. Bushfield	January 3, 1943	August 6, 1882	Atlantic, Iowa	80th (1947–1949)
Milton H. West	Democratic	Texas (15th district)	October 28, 1948	60	lymphoma	Washington, D.C.	U.S.	Lloyd Bentsen	April 23, 1933	June 30, 1888	Gonzales, Texas	80th (1947–1949)
John J. Delaney	Democratic	New York (7th district)	November 18, 1948	70	Unknown, undetermined, unavailable to public, or yet to be researched (as of April 19, 2019)	Brooklyn, New York	U.S.	Louis B. Heller	November 3, 1931 (previously served March 5, 1918 – March 3, 1919)	August 21, 1878	Brooklyn, New York	80th (1947–1949)
J. Melville Broughton	Democratic	North Carolina (Senator)	March 6, 1949	60	heart attack	Washington, D.C.	U.S.	Frank P. Graham	December 31, 1948	November 17, 1888	Raleigh, North Carolina	81st (1949–1951)
Sol Bloom	Democratic	New York (20th district)	March 7, 1949	78	heart attack	Washington, D.C.	U.S.	Franklin D. Roosevelt Jr.	March 4, 1923	March 9, 1870	Pekin, Illinois	81st (1949–1951)
Andrew L. Somers	Democratic	New York (10th district)	April 6, 1949	54	liver ailment	Queens, New York	U.S.	Edna F. Kelly	March 4, 1925	March 21, 1895	Brooklyn, New York	81st (1949–1951)
Robert L. Coffey	Democratic	Pennsylvania (26th district)	April 20, 1949	30	plane crash	Albuquerque, New Mexico	U.S.	John P. Saylor	January 3, 1949	October 21, 1918	Chattanooga, Tennessee	81st (1949–1951)
Richard J. Welch	Republican	California (5th district)	September 10, 1949	80	coronary occlusion	Needles, California	U.S.	John F. Shelley	August 31, 1926	February 13, 1869	Monroe County, New York	81st (1949–1951)
Bert H. Miller	Democratic	Idaho (Senator)	October 8, 1949	69	heart attack	Washington, D.C.	U.S.	Henry Dworshak	January 3, 1949	December 15, 1879	St. George, Utah Territory	81st (1949–1951)
George J. Bates	Republican	Massachusetts (6th district)	November 1, 1949	58	plane crash	Washington, D.C.	U.S.	William H. Bates	January 3, 1937	February 25, 1891	Salem, Massachusetts	81st (1949–1951)
Clyde M. Reed	Republican	Kansas (Senator)	November 8, 1949	78	heart attack	Parsons, Kansas	U.S.	Harry Darby	January 3, 1939	October 19, 1871	Champaign County, Illinois	81st (1949–1951)
Martin Gorski	Democratic	Illinois (5th district)	December 4, 1949	63	heart attack	Chicago, Illinois	U.S.	John C. Kluczynski	January 3, 1943	October 30, 1886	Poland	81st (1949–1951)

== See also ==
- List of members of the United States Congress who died in office (1790–1899)
- List of members of the United States Congress who died in office (1950–1999)
- List of members of the United States Congress who died in office (2000–present)
