= Charles W. Roark =

American politician

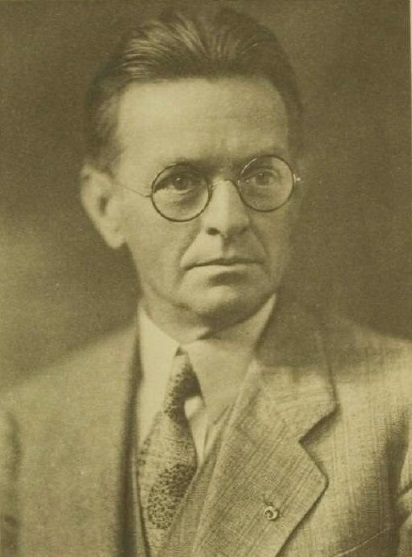
- Frontispiece of 1930's Charles W. Roark, late a Representative

Member of the U.S. House of Representatives from Kentucky's 3rd district
- In office March 4, 1929 – April 5, 1929
- Preceded by: John W. Moore
- Succeeded by: John W. Moore

Mayor of Greenville, Kentucky
- In office 1918–1922

Personal details
- Born: January 22, 1877 Greenville, Kentucky, U.S.
- Died: April 5, 1929 (aged 52) Louisville, Kentucky, U.S.
- Party: Republican

Charles Wickliffe Roark (January 22, 1877 – April 5, 1929) was a U.S. representative from Kentucky.

Born in Greenville, Kentucky, Roark attended the public schools and the Greenville Seminary. He was founder and president of the Greenville Milling Co. He served as president of the Kentucky Retail Lumbermen in 1908 and of the Tri-State Lumber Dealers' Association in 1909.

Roark was elected mayor of Greenville and served from 1918 to 1922.

Roark was elected as a Republican to the Seventy-first Congress and served from March 4, 1929, until his death, before the convening of Congress. He died in Louisville, Kentucky, April 5, 1929 and was interred in the family lot in Evergreen Cemetery in Greenville.

== See also ==
- List of members of the United States Congress who died in office (1900–1949)

U.S. House of Representatives
Preceded by John W. Moore	United States Representative, Kentucky's 3rd district March 4, 1929 – April 5, 1929	Succeeded by John W. Moore
