= John William Moore =

American politician (1877–1941)

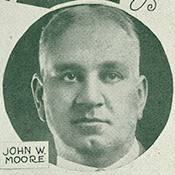
- John William Moore c. 1930s

Member of the U.S. House of Representatives from Kentucky's 3rd district
- In office June 1, 1929 – March 3, 1933
- Preceded by: Charles W. Roark
- Succeeded by: Emmet O'Neal
- In office December 26, 1925 – March 3, 1929
- Preceded by: Robert Y. Thomas Jr.
- Succeeded by: Charles W. Roark

Personal details
- Born: June 9, 1877 Morgantown, Kentucky, U.S.
- Died: December 11, 1941 (aged 64) Washington, D.C., U.S.
- Resting place: Morgantown Cemetery, Morgantown, Kentucky, U.S.
- Party: Democratic
- Profession: Politician

John William Moore (June 9, 1877 – December 11, 1941) was a U.S. representative from Kentucky.

Born in Morgantown, Kentucky, Moore attended the public schools and completed a commercial course at Bryant and Stratton College at Louisville in 1897. He became a clerk with the Morgantown Deposit Bank in 1898. He engaged in the timber business 1899–1919. Cashier for the Morgantown Deposit Bank 1920–1925.

Moore was elected as a Democrat to the Sixty-ninth Congress in a special election, to fill the vacancy caused by the death of United States Representative Robert Y. Thomas, Jr. and reelected to the succeeding Congress (December 26, 1925 – March 3, 1929). He was an unsuccessful candidate for reelection to the Seventy-first Congress in 1928.

Moore was elected as a Democrat to the Seventy-first Congress in a special election, to fill the vacancy caused by the death of United States Representative Charles W. Roark, and reelected to the succeeding Congress (June 1, 1929 – March 3, 1933). He was not a candidate for renomination to the Seventy-third Congress in 1932. He resumed his former business pursuits. He was employed in the Federal Housing Administration at Washington, D.C., as an assistant comptroller 1935–1941. He died in Washington, D.C., December 11, 1941. He was interred in Morgantown Cemetery, Morgantown, Kentucky.

U.S. House of Representatives
Preceded by Robert Y. Thomas, Jr.	United States Representative, Kentucky's 3rd district December 26, 1925 – March 3, 1929	Succeeded by Charles W. Roark
Preceded by Charles W. Roark	United States Representative, Kentucky's 3rd district June 1, 1929 – March 3, 1933	Succeeded by Emmet O'Neal
