= 1936 New Jersey Republican presidential primary =

1936 New Jersey Republican presidential primaries
- May 19, 1936
- Presidential delegate primary

32 Republican National Convention delegates

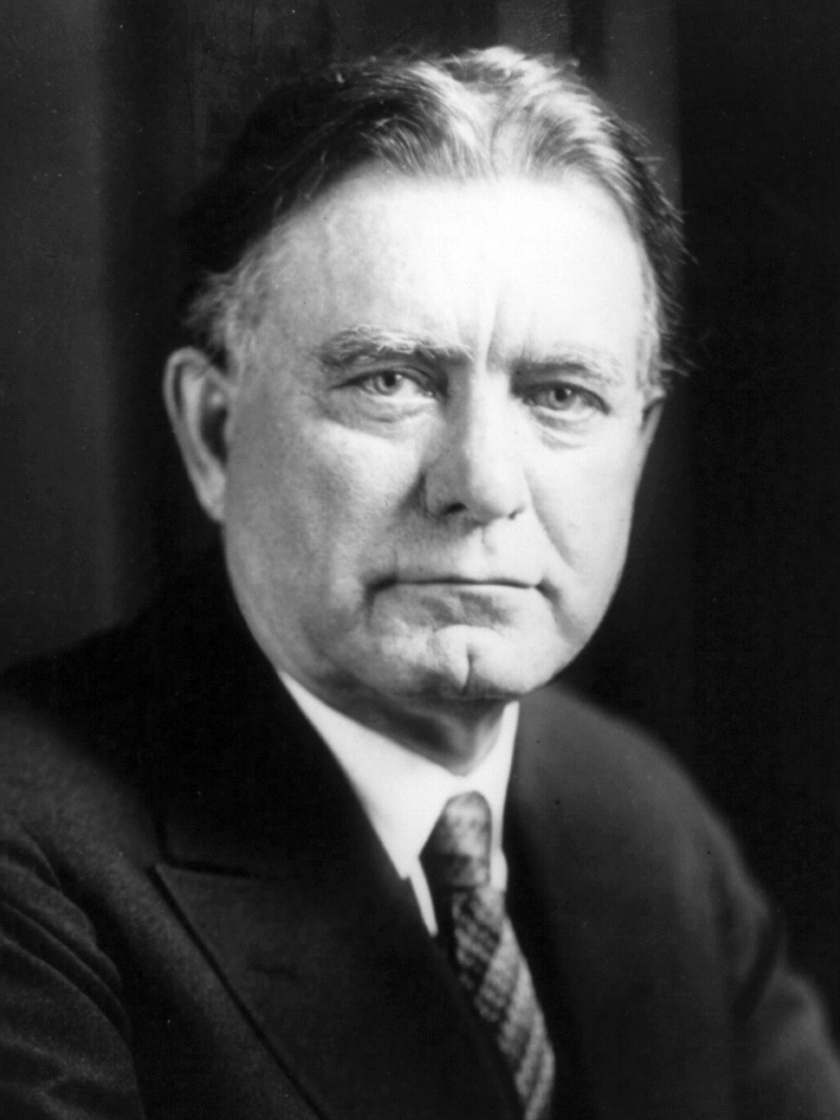
| Candidate | Alf Landon | Uncommitted | William Borah |
| Home state | Kansas | | Idaho |
| Delegate count | 24 | 8 | 0 |
| Popular vote | 552,548 | 124,211 | 112,121 |
| Percentage | 70.0% | 15.7% | 14.2% |
- Presidential preference primary (non-binding)

No Republican National Convention delegates

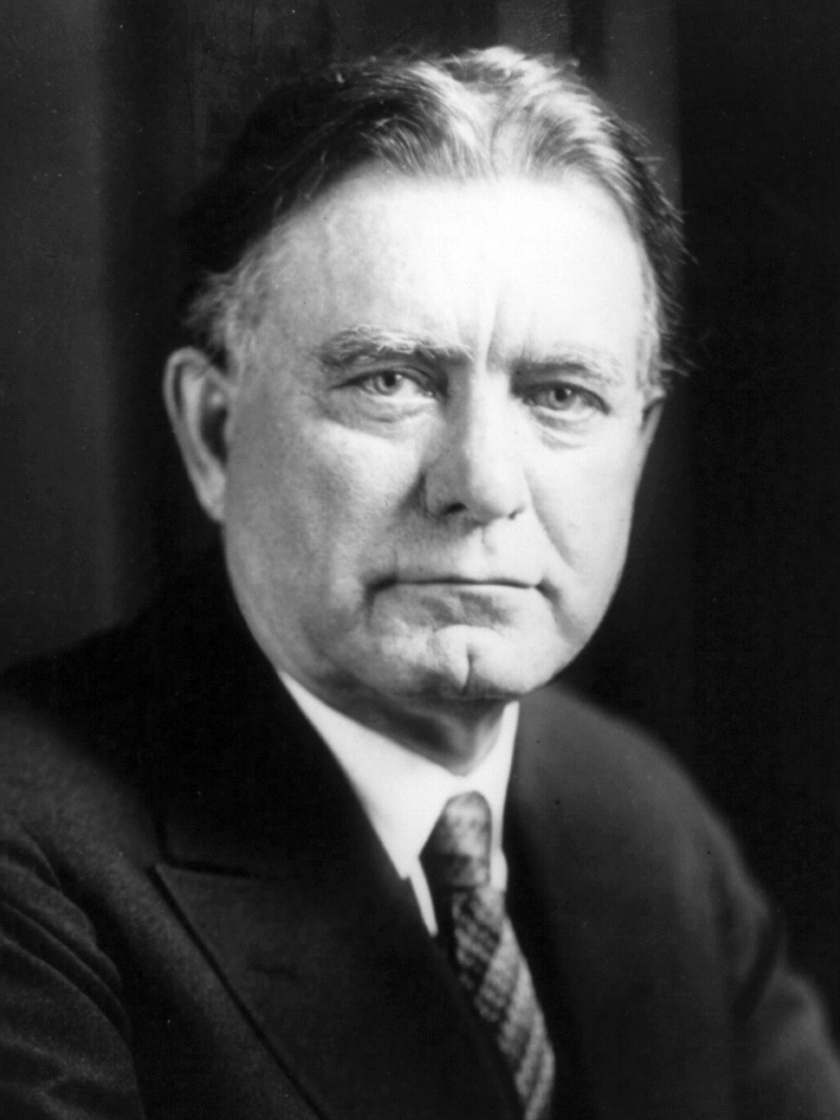
| Candidate | Alf Landon | William Borah |
| Home state | Kansas | Idaho |
| Popular vote | 347,142 | 91,052 |
| Percentage | 79.2% | 20.8% |

The 1936 New Jersey Republican presidential primary was held on May 19, 1936, in New Jersey as one of the Republican Party's statewide nomination contests ahead of the 1936 United States presidential election. Delegates to the 1936 Republican National Convention were elected from each of the state's congressional districts, along with four delegates at-large.

Kansas governor Alf Landon won in a landslide, sweeping a majority of delegates, and defeating Idaho senator William Borah. Landon would go on to win the nomination at the national convention nearly unanimously.

== Background ==
=== Procedure ===
In 1936, New Jersey was allocated 32 total delegates to the Republican National Convention. Four delegates were elected at-large, and two delegates were elected from each of the state's fourteen congressional districts, along with two alternates. Delegates were given the choice of pledging support to a particular candidate or running as uncommitted delegates.

The state also held a non-binding presidential preference primary, in order for voters to directly express their preference for a candidate. Landon defeated Borah in a landslide.

== Candidates ==
- William Borah, United States senator from Idaho
- Alf Landon, Governor of Kansas

== Endorsements ==
William Borah

Individuals

- C. Dan Coskey, candidate for U.S. senator (ran for district delegate)
- James Hetherington, founder of the Passaic County Taxpayers League and candidate for mayor of Paterson in 1931 and 1933 (ran for district delegate)
- Max J. Jelin, New Brunswick theatre operator (ran for district delegate)
Alf Landon

State legislators

- Lester H. Clee, state senator for Essex County (ran for district delegate)
- Charles E. Loizeaux, state senator for Union County and former mayor of Plainfield (ran for district delegate)

Local officials

- Harry Huelsenbeck, former Essex County Sheriff (ran for district alternate)
- Alexander MacLeod, Passaic County judge (ran for district delegate)
- Joshua McCarthy, former member of the Teaneck Town Committee (ran for district delegate)
- George S. Mills, mayor of Leonia (ran for district delegate)
- William B. Ross, Kearny town clerk (ran for district alternate)
- Reeve Schley, former mayor of Far Hills and Chase National Bank executive (ran for district delegate)
- C. Benton Wigton, former mayor of Plainfield (ran for district delegate)
- Henry G. Wilkens, former mayor of Dumont (ran for district delegate)
- Elwood J. Wilson, mayor of Montvale (ran for district alternate)

Individuals

- Hendon Chubb, banker and philanthropist (ran for district delegate)
- Robert Kean, banker and son of former U.S. senator Hamilton Fish Kean (ran for district delegate)
- Gloanna W. MacCarthy, former president of the Woman's Club of Maplewood (ran for district alternate)
- Oliver Macdonald, Paterson dentist and former Olympic gold medalist (ran for district delegate)
- Paul Moore Sr., businessman and son of W.H. Moore (ran for district delegate)
- Henry Spence, former president of the New Jersey State Board of Health (ran for district delegate)
- Arthur T. Vanderbilt, Short Hills attorney and reformer (ran for district delegate)
- William J. Wells, former Macy's and Bamberger's executive (ran for district alternate)
Uncommitted

State executive branch officials

- William T. Read, former New Jersey Treasurer and state senator for Camden County (ran for district delegate)

State legislators

- John M. Summerill Jr., former assemblyman from Salem County (ran for district alternate)
- Emerson Lewis Richards, state senator for Atlantic County (ran for district delegate)

Individuals

- Stephen J. Stoll, president of the New Jersey State Council of Carpenters (ran for district delegate)

== Campaign ==
In several districts, competing slates of Landon delegates faced off with Borah delegates in a distant third place.

== Results ==
=== Preference primary results ===
1936 New Jersey Republican presidential preference primary
| Party | Candidate | Votes | % |
|---|---|---|---|
| Republican | Alf Landon | 347,142 | 79.18% |
| Republican | William Borah | 91,052 | 20.77% |
| Democratic | Franklin D. Roosevelt (inc.; write-in) | 148 | 0.03% |
| Republican | Herbert Hoover (write-in) | 74 | 0.02% |
| Total votes | | 438,416 | 100.00% |

=== Delegate primary results ===
| Delegate slate | Candidate | Delegate candidates | | Delegates | | Aggregate votes | |
| Delegate slate | Candidate | Statewide | District | Total | Of total (%) | Total | Of total (%) |
|---|---|---|---|---|---|---|---|
| Alfred E. Landon | Alf Landon | 0 | 38 | 24 | 75.00 | | |
| Uncommitted | —N/a | 10 | 14 | 8 | 25.00 | | |
| William E. Borah | William Borah | 0 | 21 | 0 | 0.00 | | |
| Total | | 7 | 73 | 32 | 100.0 | | 100.00 |
| Registered voters, and turnout | | | | | | | |

==== Delegate primary results by contest ====
1936 New Jersey Republican primary
| Contest | Delegates and popular vote | | | | |
| Contest | Landon | Uncommitted | Borah | Other | Total |
|---|---|---|---|---|---|
| At-large | – | 4; 1,632,594 (100.00%) | – | – | 1,632,594 |
| 1st district | – | 2; 47,647 (62.38%) | 28,732 (37.62%) | – | 76,379 |
| 2nd district | 17,253 (25.34%) | 2; 38,636 (56.75%) | 12,190 (17.91%) | – | 68,079 |
| 3rd district | 2; 51,975 (82.04%) | – | 11,377 (17.96%) | – | 63,352 |
| 4th district | 2; 47,276 (72.43%) | – | 17,991 (27.47%) | – | 65,267 |
| 5th district | 2; 52,354 (80.94%) | – | 12,327 (19.06%) | – | 64,681 |
| 6th district | 2; 49,126 (92.05%) | – | 4,242 (7.95%) | – | 53,368 |
| 7th district | 2; 52,113 (87.22%) | – | 7,633 (12.78%) | – | 59,746 |
| 8th district | 2; 38,213 (78.22%) | – | 10,638 (21.78%) | – | 48,851 |
| 9th district | 2; 55,114 (93.29%) | | 3,967 (6.71%) | – | 59,081 |
| 10th district | 2; 54,163 (88.44%) | 7,080 (11.56%) | – | – | 61,243 |
| 11th district | 2; 42,314 (77.39%) | 12,365 (22.61%) | – | – | 54,679 |
| 12th district | 2; 55,773 (75.11%) | 18,483 (24.89%) | – | – | 74,256 |
| 13th district | 2; 23,427 (95.13%) | – | 1,200 (4.87%) | – | 24,627 |
| 14th district | 2; 13,447 (88.06%) | – | 1,824 (11.94%) | – | 15,271 |
| District totals | 24 552,548 (70.04%) | 8 124,211 (15.75%) | 112,121 (14.21%) | – | 788,880 |

== Aftermath ==
Ultimately, the New Jersey delegation unanimously supported Landon at the 1936 Republican National Convention.
