= 1936 Republican Party presidential primaries =

Selection of Republican US presidential candidate

- March 10 to May 19, 1936

1,003 delegates to the Republican National Convention 502 (majority) votes needed to win
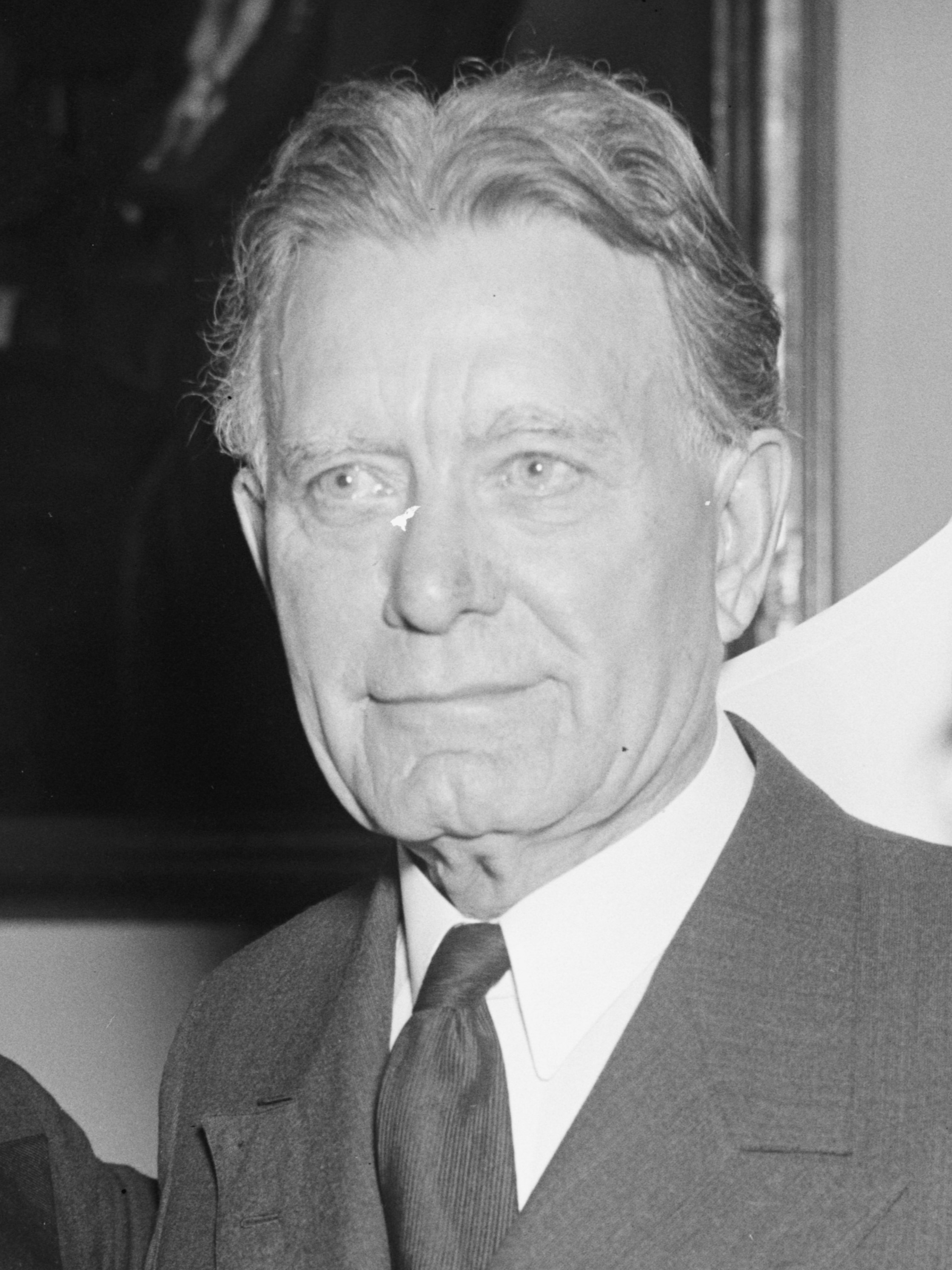

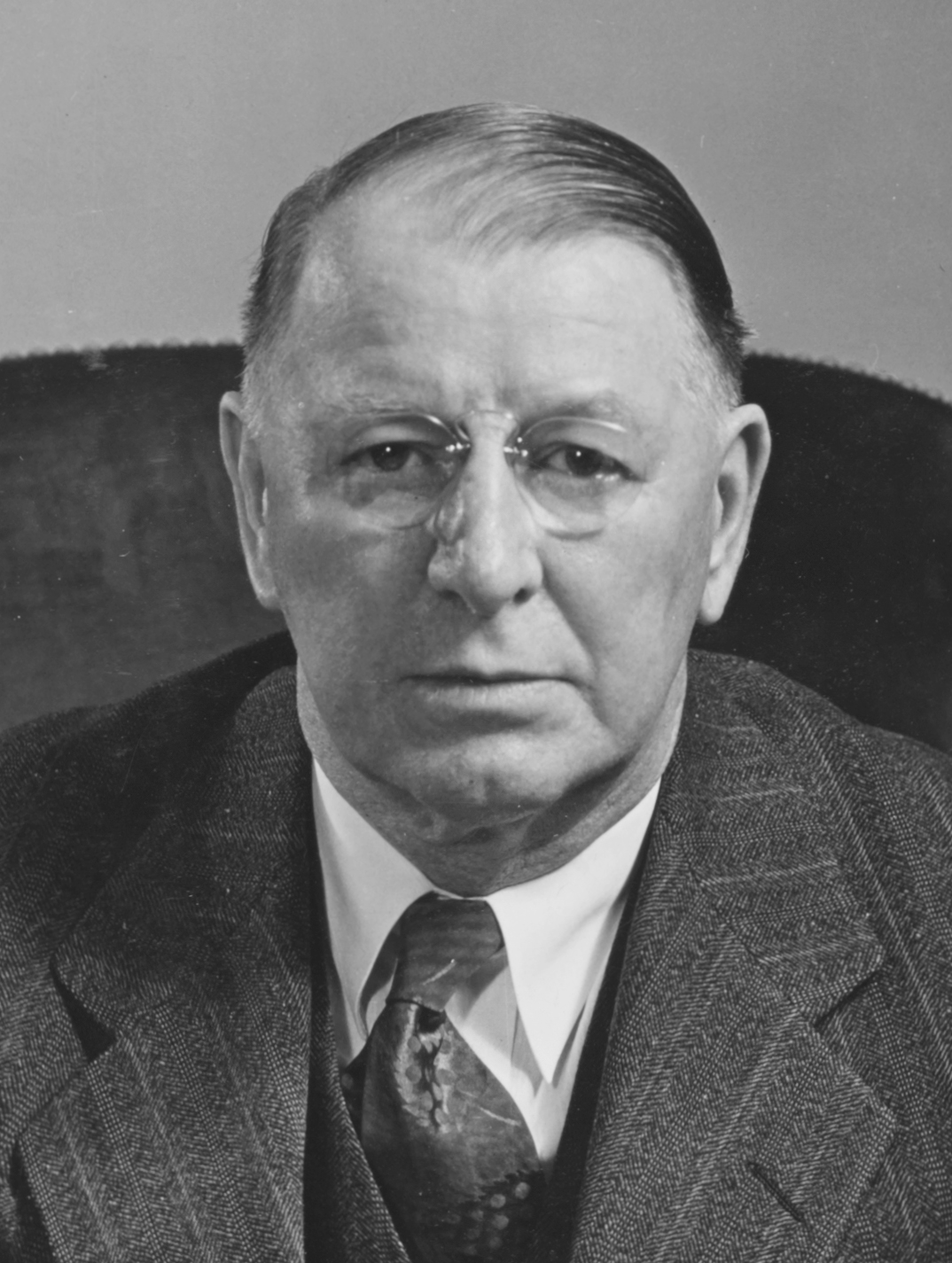
| Candidate | William Borah | Alf Landon | Frank Knox |
| Home state | Idaho | Kansas | Illinois |
| Contests won | 5 | 3 | 1 |
| Popular vote | 1,478,676 | 729,908 | 527,054 |
| Percentage | 44.5% | 21.9% | 15.8% |
First place finishes by popular vote
William Borah (5)
Alfred Landon (3)
Frank Knox (1)
Earl Warren (1)
Stephen A. Day (1)
Warren E. Green (1)
Previous Republican nominee
Herbert Hoover
Republican nominee
Alf Landon

From March 10 to May 19, 1936, voters of the Republican Party chose its nominee for president in the 1936 United States presidential election. The nominee was selected through a series of primary elections and caucuses culminating in the 1936 Republican National Convention held from June 9 to June 12, 1936, in Cleveland, Ohio.

Although many candidates sought the Republican nomination, only two, Governor Alfred Landon and Senator William Borah, were considered to be serious candidates.

While favorite sons County Attorney Earl Warren of California, Governor Warren E. Green of South Dakota, and Stephen A. Day of Ohio won their respective primaries, the 70-year-old Borah, a well-known progressive and "insurgent," carried the Wisconsin, Nebraska, Pennsylvania, West Virginia, and Oregon primaries, while also performing quite strongly in Knox's Illinois and Green's South Dakota. However, the party machinery almost uniformly backed Landon, a wealthy businessman and centrist, who won primaries in Massachusetts and New Jersey and dominated in the caucuses and at state party conventions.

== Schedule and results ==
| Date | Delegates | Primary | William Borah | Alfred Landon | Herbert Hoover | Arthur Vandenberg | Frank Knox | Others | Uncommitted |
|---|---|---|---|---|---|---|---|---|---|
| March 10 | | New Hampshire | 0% | 0% | | | | | |
| April 7 | | Wisconsin | 98% | 0% | | | | | |
| April 14 | | Illinois | 54% | 0% | | | | | |
| April 14 | | Nebraska | 74% | 25% | | | | | |
| April 28 | | Massachusetts preference primary 95,616 | 4,259 (4.45%) | 76,862 (80.39%) | 7,276 (7.61%) | 2,104 (2.20%) | 1,987 (2.08%) | 3,128 (Note: 1,334 votes for Franklin D. Roosevelt, 259 votes for Charles Coughlin, 105 votes for Francis E. Townsend, 89 votes for John W. Haigis, 85 votes for Al Smith, 71 votes for Lester J. Dickinson, and 1,185 votes for all other candidates.) (3.27%) | – |
| April 28 | | Pennsylvania | 60% | 0% | | | | | |
| May 5 | | California | 0% | 43% | | | | | |
| May 5 | | South Dakota | 50% | 0% | | | | | |
| May 12 | | Ohio | 3% | 6% | | | | | |
| May 12 | | West Virginia | 85% | 0% | | | | | |
| May 15 | | Oregon | 90% | 4% | | | | | |
| May 19 | 32 | New Jersey delegate primary 788,880 | 112,121 (14.21%) | 24 552,548 (70.04%) | – | – | – | – | 8 124,211 (15.75%) |
| May 19 | 0 | New Jersey preference primary 438,416 | 91,052 (20.77%) | 347,142 (79.18%) | 74 (0.02%) | – | – | 148 (0.03%) (Note: All votes for Franklin D. Roosevelt.) | – |

== Candidates ==
=== Nominee ===
| Candidate | Experience | Home state | Campaign | Popular vote | Contests won | Running mate |
|---|---|---|---|---|---|---|
| Alf Landon | Governor of Kansas (1933–1937) Chairman of the Kansas Republican Party (1928–1930) | Kansas | (Campaign) Secured nomination: June 9, 1936 | 869,602 (36.0%) | 3 | Frank Knox |

=== Withdrew at convention ===
These candidates participated in multiple state primaries or were included in multiple major national polls and withdrew their candidacy at the Republican National Convention.

| Candidate | Experience | Home state | Campaign | Popular vote | Contests won |
|---|---|---|---|---|---|
| William Borah | U.S. Senator from Idaho (1907–1940) | Idaho | (Campaign); Withdrew at convention | 1,478,676 (44.5%) | 5 |

=== Withdrew prior to convention ===
These candidates participated in multiple state primaries or were included in multiple major national polls and withdrew their candidacy prior to the start of the RNC.

| Candidate | Experience | Home state | Campaign | Popular vote | Contests won |
|---|---|---|---|---|---|
| Frank Knox | Publisher of the Chicago Daily News | Illinois | Withdrew before convention | 527,054 (17.8%) | 1 |

=== Favorite sons ===
The following candidates ran only in their home state's primary or caucus for the purpose of controlling its delegate slate at the convention and did not appear to be considered national candidates by the media.

| Candidate | Experience | Home state | Campaign | Popular vote | Contests won |
|---|---|---|---|---|---|
| Stephen A. Day | Special counsel to the Comptroller of the Currency (1926-1928) | Illinois | Withdrew before convention | 527,054 (17.8%) | 1 |
| Warren Green | Governor of South Dakota (1931-1933) | South Dakota | [data missing] | [data missing] | 1 |
| Earl Warren | District Attorney of Alameda County (1925 -1939) | California | [data missing] | [data missing] | 1 |

=== Declined to run ===
The following persons were listed in two or more major national polls or were the subject of media speculation surrounding their potential candidacy, but declined to actively seek the nomination.

- Former Vice President Charles G. Dawes of Illinois
- Senator Lester J. Dickinson of Iowa (ran for re-election instead)
- Former President Herbert Hoover of California
- Former Governor Frank Lowden of Illinois
- Senator Charles L. McNary of Oregon
- Senator Arthur Vandenberg of Michigan

== Polling ==
Graph of opinion polls conducted View source data.

=== National polling ===
| Poll source | Publication | William Borah | Lester Dickinson | Herbert Hoover | Frank Knox | Alf Landon | Arthur Vandenberg |
|---|---|---|---|---|---|---|---|
| Gallup | Oct. 1935 | 26% | 1% | 12% | 8% | 33% | 3% |
| Gallup | Jan. 1936 | 28% | 1% | 17% | 7% | 43% | 4% |
| Gallup | March 1936 | 20% | 1% | 14% | 5% | 56% | 4% |
| Gallup | Apr. 1936 | 19% | 1% | 14% | 5% | 56% | 5% |
| Gallup | Apr. 1936 | 18% | 1% | 14% | 6% | 55% | 6% |

== Convention ==
With Knox's candidacy withdrawing in order to become Landon's selection for vice president, and Day, Green, and Warren releasing their delegates, Landon's victory was assured.

| Ballot | Alfred Landon | William Borah | VP Ballot | Frank Knox |
|---|---|---|---|---|
| First | 984 | 19 | First | 1,003 |

== See also ==
- 1936 Democratic Party presidential primaries
