= Fillmore Condit =

American inventor and politician (1855-1939)

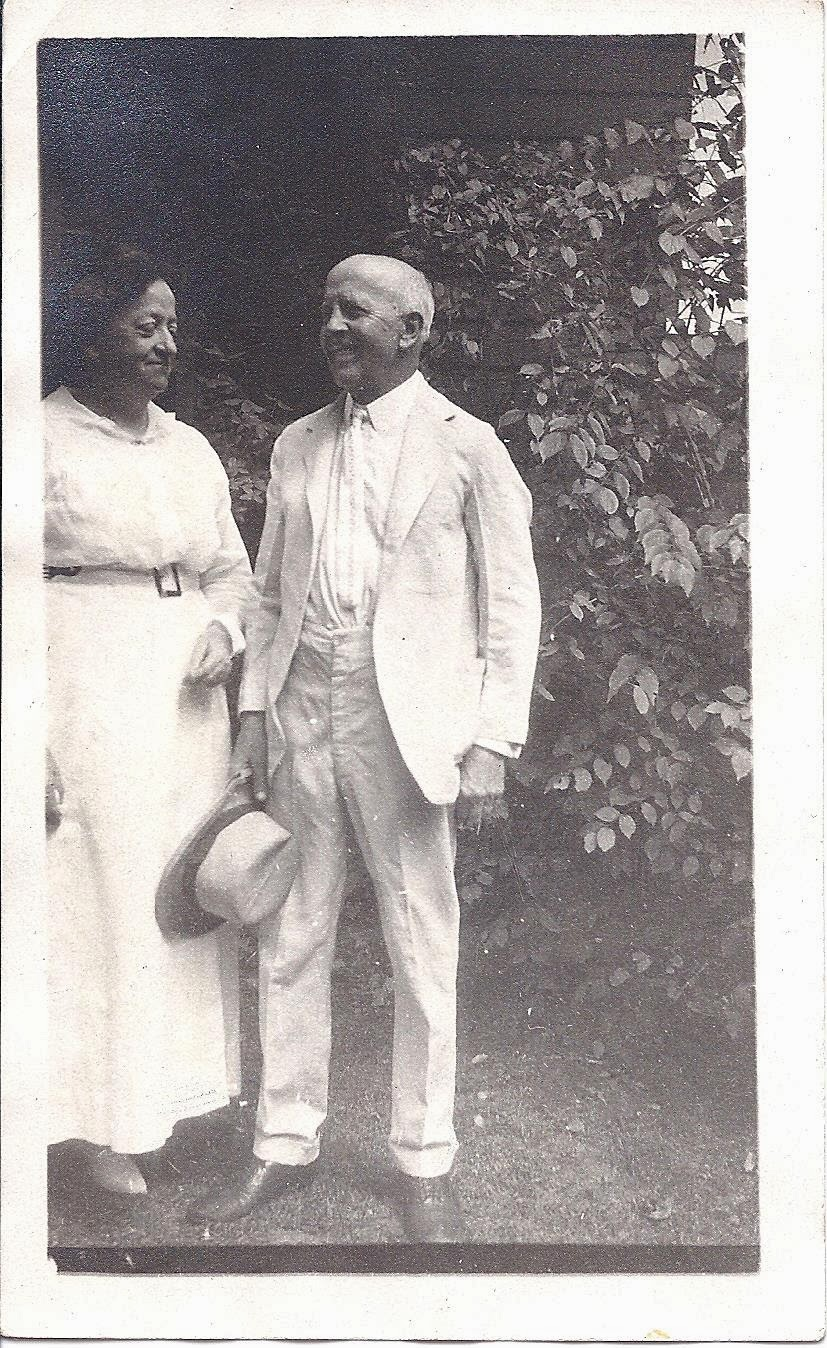
- Fillmore Condit with Ida in Long Beach circa 1920

Chairman of the Anti-Saloon League
- In office 1913–1921

Mayor of Long Beach, California
- In office 1926–1927
- Preceded by: Ray R. Clark
- Succeeded by: Oscar Hauge

Member of the Essex County, New Jersey Board of Chosen Freeholders

Personal details
- Born: September 4, 1855 Roseland, New Jersey, US
- Died: January 6, 1939 (aged 83) Long Beach, California, US
- Party: Prohibition

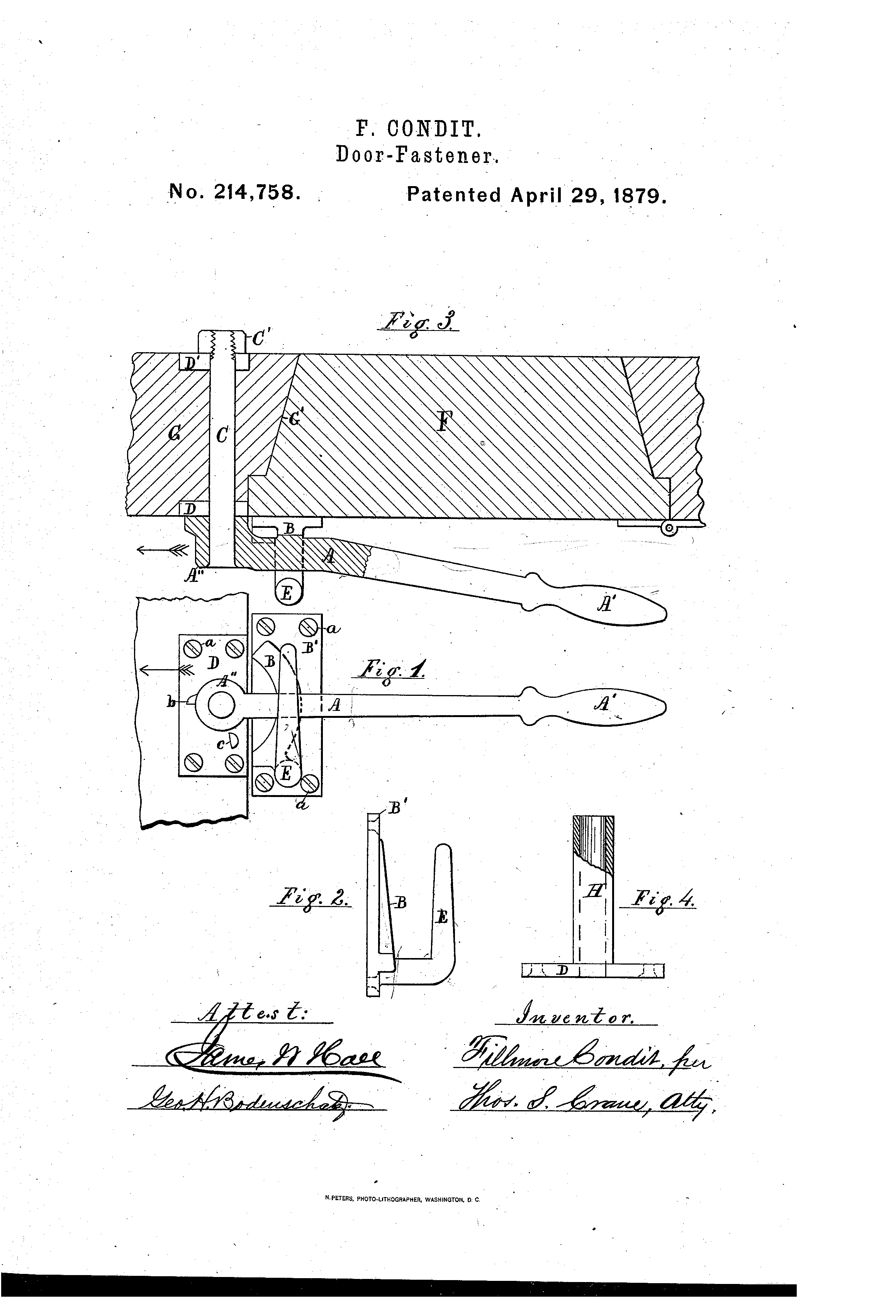
Fillmore Condit door latch design US214758-drawings-page-1

Fillmore Condit (September 4, 1855 – January 6, 1939) was an American inventor, oil executive, and Prohibition Party politician from New Jersey. He was an activist for temperance and women's suffrage and a major financial supporter of these causes.

From 1913 to 1921, he chaired the national executive committee of the Anti-Saloon League, the leading prohibitionist lobbying organization in the United States. In 1919, the League nominated him for governor of New Jersey, but he withdrew after extracting concessions from the Republican Party.

After moving to California, he was also elected to local office in Long Beach.

== Biography ==
Fillmore Condit was born on September 4, 1855 in Roseland, New Jersey to Stephen J. and Catherine (née Laffan) Condit. His father was a descendant of the Newark colonist John Condit, through whom the family was related to American revolutionary John Condit, U.S. representative Silas Condit, and Rutgers University president Ira Condict.

As a young man, Fillmore Condit began working at his father's farm in Roseland and the village general store. He also worked at a saw mill and in the meat business. In 1879, he invented a refrigerator door fastener for use in his own meat market and patented it for manufacture and resale.

In 1890, Condit moved his family to Verona, New Jersey, where he soon participated in local politics, serving on the Essex County board of chosen freeholders. In 1899, the family relocated briefly to California, where Fillmore became interested in the oil industry. They returned to New Jersey in 1901, where he was placed in charge of the Eastern District of the Union Oil Company of California.

=== Temperance movement and Prohibition ===
Condit first became involved in the American temperance movement as a young man, being elected president of a young men's temperance organization before the age of twenty. He joined the Prohibition Party and was a leading supporter of Clinton B. Fisk in the 1886 New Jersey gubernatorial election. He filled various party positions and advocated for the party in the press and on the campaign stump, as well as fundraising for its cause.

On returning to New Jersey, Condit joined the Anti-Saloon League. He became a member of its New Jersey Committee in 1904, quickly rising to become its president in 1905. From 1913 to 1921, he was the chairman of the organization's national executive committee. He also served as chairman of the board of the American Issue Publishing Company, which published his popular anti-alcohol tract The Relation of Saloons to Insanity in 1910.

In 1913, Condit testified to a grand jury investigating James Kennedy McGuire, which later indicted McGuire on charges of soliciting a campaign contribution from a corporation. In addition to temperance, Condit spoke out in support of women's suffrage and was a featured speaker at a National Suffrage Day meeting in Montclair. He was also one of the speakers during the 1915 tour of the "Torch of Victory," circulated under the auspices of the Women's Political Union.

Condit was nominated by the Anti-Saloon League for governor of New Jersey in 1919, but he withdrew after obtaining concessions from the Republican Party to support Prohibition.

=== Return to California ===
Condit and his family decided to return to California and settled in Long Beach, where he entered into city politics, serving as a councilman and mayor, and succeeded in founding a city hospital there.

== Personal life and death ==
Condit was a long-standing member of the Methodist Episcopal Church of Verona. After moving to California permanently, he became president of the Long Beach Methodist Union.

During the 1880s, he became involved in the Hospital for Women and Children at Newark, and he maintained his involvement for over thirty years, rising to become its governor and president. Similarly, he organized the Long Beach Community Hospital Association after relocating to California. An article analyzing his hospital policies appeared in the journal California and Western Medicine.

=== Marriages and children ===
According to Condit's own biography, he met his wife Ida Rafter as a customer in his store. They were married on March 30, 1881 in Newark. He built a new home for his family in Verona on a large plot of land. Although he later subdivided the property and sold lots for new homes on its periphery, he maintained a large, central plot of greenspace for his son Everett, who had tuberculosis. After his son's death in 1911, he relocated to Essex Fells and deeded the land to the township of Verona, and the property became the site of Everett Park.

In July 1912, his wife purchased a mansion next to their home in Essex Fells, New Jersey, to keep it from being converted into a "negro sanitarium." Mrs. Condit was quoted as saying that she "knew all of our homes would be ruined, especially mine, which is just next door."

After Ida died in 1921, Fillmore married Helen Mackinnon on December 5, 1922.

He adopted at least one homeless child before 1924.

=== Death ===
He died in Long Beach on January 6, 1939.

== See also ==
- List of mayors of Long Beach, California
