= 1934 United States Senate election in New Jersey =

- November 6, 1934
- Turnout: 71% (▼13pp)
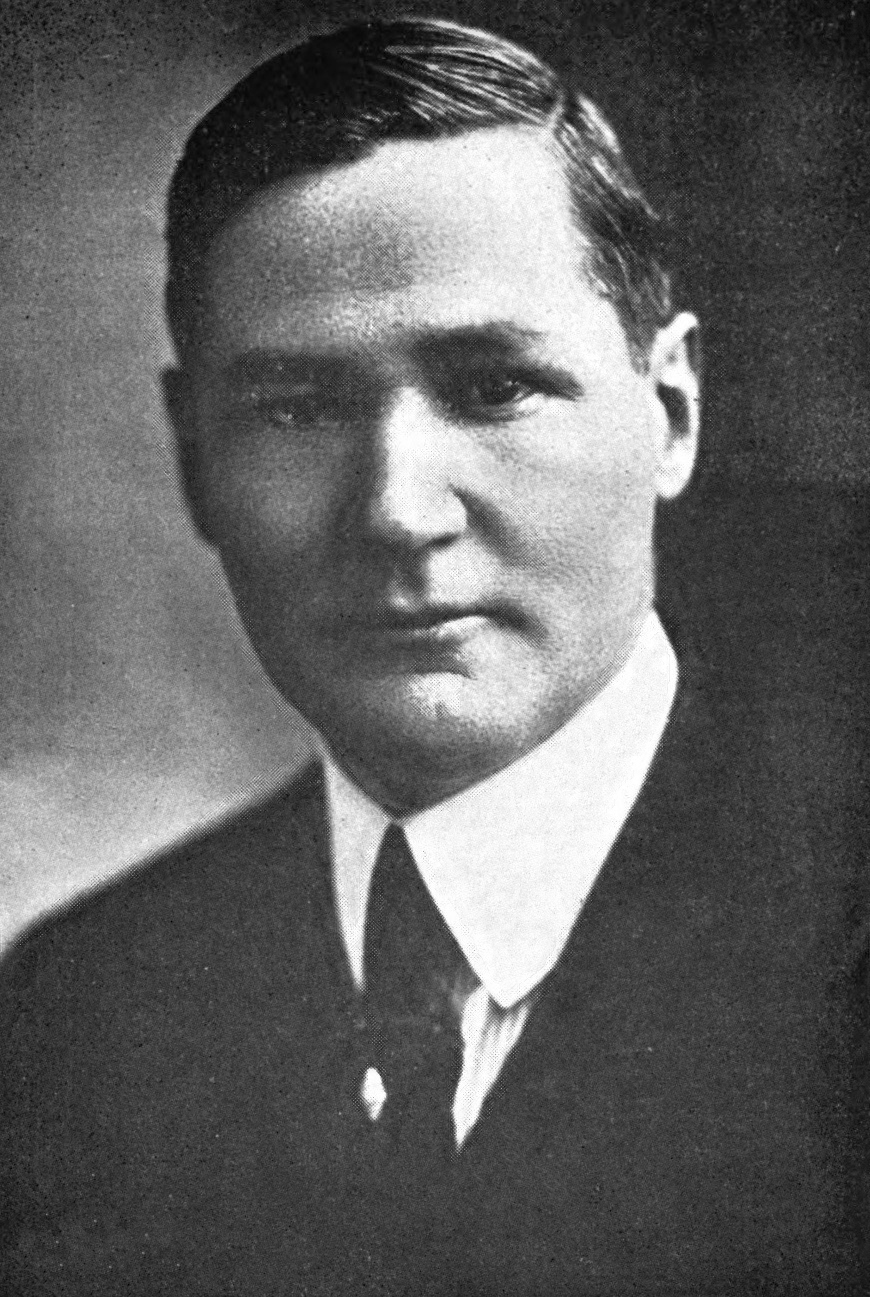

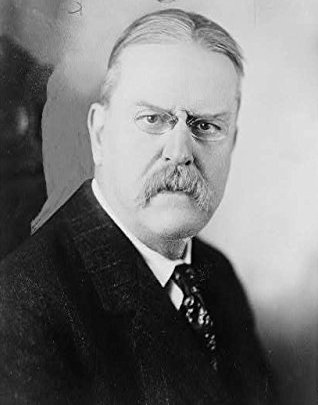
| Nominee | A. Harry Moore | Hamilton Fish Kean |
| Party | Democratic | Republican |
| Popular vote | 785,971 | 554,483 |
| Percentage | 57.90% | 40.85% |
- County results Moore: 40–50% 50–60% 60–70% 70–80% Kean: 50–60%
U.S. senator before election
Hamilton Fish Kean
Republican
Elected U.S. senator
A. Harry Moore
Democratic

The United States Senate election of 1934 in New Jersey was held on November 6, 1934.

Incumbent Republican Senator Hamilton Fish Kean ran for re-election to a second term in office, but was defeated by Governor of New Jersey A. Harry Moore in a landslide.

This was among the nine seats Democrats gained in this year's elections.

This election also marks the end of a streak of four straight elections in which the incumbents were defeated, beginning in 1916.

== Republican primary ==
=== Candidates ===
- James Blauvelt, former Assemblyman from Ridgewood
- Hamilton Fish Kean, incumbent Senator since 1929

=== Campaign ===
Senator Kean was challenged by former Assemblyman James Blauvelt, who opposed what he called Kean's "Wall Street viewpoint." The opposition came as a surprise to the Senator and most Republicans. He ran on a ticket named "Public Ownership; Against Wall St. Domination."

=== Results ===
1934 Republican U.S. Senate primary
| Party | Candidate | Votes | % |
|---|---|---|---|
| Republican | Hamilton Fish Kean (inc.) | 321,890 | 73.36% |
| Republican | James Blauvelt | 116,886 | 26.64% |
| Total votes | | 438,776 | 100.00% |

== Democratic primary ==
=== Candidates ===
- A. Harry Moore, Governor of New Jersey

=== Results ===
Governor Moore was unopposed for the Democratic nomination.

1934 Democratic U.S. Senate primary
| Party | Candidate | Votes | % |
|---|---|---|---|
| Democratic | A. Harry Moore | 294,960 | 100.00% |
| Total votes | | 294,960 | 100.00% |

== General election ==
=== Candidates ===
- John C. Butterworth (Socialist Labor)
- William L. Detmering (Independent Voters)
- Rebecca Grecht (Communist)
- Elwood Hollingsworth (Prohibition)
- Hamilton Fish Kean (Republican), incumbent Senator
- John S. Martin (Socialist)
- A. Harry Moore (Democratic), Governor of New Jersey

=== Results ===
1934 United States Senate election in New Jersey
| Party | Candidate | Votes | % |
|---|---|---|---|
| Democratic | A. Harry Moore | 785,971 | 57.90% |
| Republican | Hamilton Fish Kean (incumbent) | 554,483 | 40.85% |
| Socialist | John S. Martin | 9,721 | 0.72% |
| Communist | Rebecca Grecht | 2,874 | 0.21% |
| Prohibition | Elwood Hollingshead | 2,072 | 0.15% |
| Socialist Labor | John C. Butterworth | 1,640 | 0.12% |
| Independent Veteran | William L. Detmering | 648 | 0.05% |
| Majority | | 231,488 | 17.05% |
| Turnout | | 1,357,409 | |
| Democratic gain from Republican | | | |

== See also ==
- 1934 United States Senate elections
