= 1928 United States Senate election in New Jersey =

- November 6, 1928
- Turnout: 84%
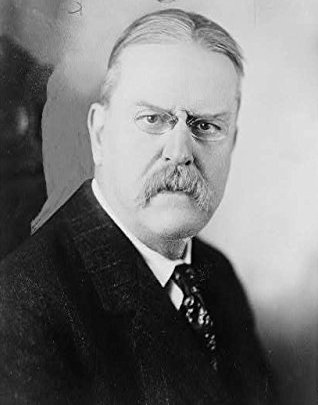

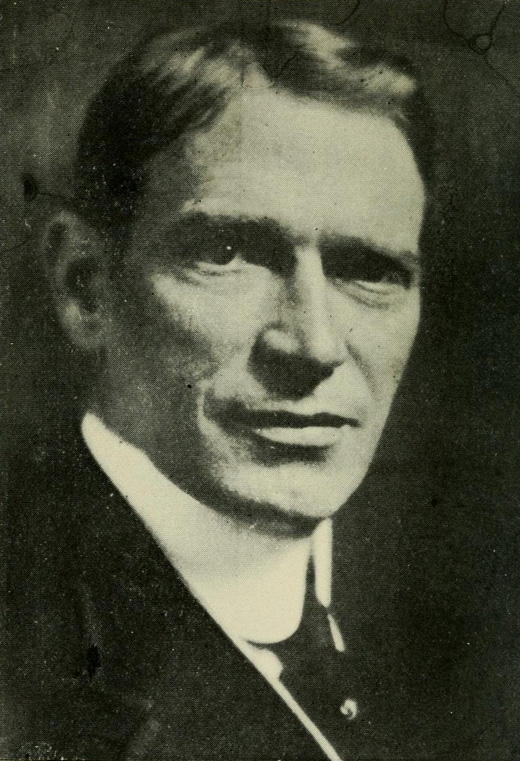
Nominee	Hamilton Fish Kean	Edward I. Edwards
Party	Republican	Democratic
Popular vote	841,752	608,623
Percentage	57.87%	41.84%
- County results Kean: 50–60% 60–70% 70–80% Edwards: 60–70%
Senator before election
Edward I. Edwards
Democratic
Elected Senator
Hamilton Fish Kean
Republican

The United States Senate election of 1928 in New Jersey was held on November 6, 1928. Incumbent Democratic Senator Edward I. Edwards ran for re-election to a second term in office, but was defeated by Hamilton Fish Kean in a landslide. This was the third of four straight elections to this seat in which the incumbents were defeated.

== Democratic primary ==
=== Candidates ===
- Edward I. Edwards, incumbent Senator since 1923

=== Results ===
Senator Edwards was unopposed for the re-nomination.

1928 Democratic U.S. Senate primary
Party	Candidate	Votes	%
Democratic	Edward I. Edwards (incumbent)	153,528	100.0%
Total votes		153,528	100.0%

== Republican primary ==
=== Candidates ===
- Lillian Feickert, suffragette, former vice-chair of the New Jersey Republican Party, and prohibition activist
- Joseph Frelinghuysen, former U.S. Senator (1917–23)
- Edward W. Gray, former U.S. Representative from Jersey City (1915–19)
- Hamilton Fish Kean, member of the Republican National Committee and candidate for Senate in 1924
- Edward C. Stokes, former Governor of New Jersey (1905–08)

=== Campaign ===
In June 1924, former Senator Joseph Frelinghuysen declined to run for the U.S. Senate and announced his intention to run in this election instead.

In June 1927, party chair and former Governor Edward C. Stokes entered the race after failing to convince Frelinghuysen and Hamilton Fish Kean to step aside for a compromise candidate. Frelinghuysen derided Stokes for having no particular candidate in mind.

Kean formally announced his entry into the race on January 19, claiming that President Calvin Coolidge had advised him to run.

Lillian Feickert and Edward W. Gray ran peripheral campaigns focused on the issue of prohibition; Feickert supported prohibition and Gray was opposed. Feickert ran as the sole "dry" candidate.

=== Endorsements ===
Joseph Frelinghuysen
- Clarence Case, New Jersey Senator for Somerset County
- Somerset County Republican Party
Hamilton Fish Kean
- Enoch L. Johnson
Edward C. Stokes
- Walter Evans Edge, United States Senator from New Jersey

=== Campaign spending ===
In February, Frelinghuysen claimed that other candidates were spending too freely and risking an investigation by James Reed's Senate committee on campaign spending, which had begun investigations into the elections of William Scott Vare and Frank L. Smith. (Both would ultimately be expelled.) Most observers took this as an attack on Kean.

Kean, Frelinghuysen, and Stokes were all called to testify before the Reed committee in early June. Both Kean and Frelinghuysen testified that they donated the maximum $50,000 to their campaigns and did not accept outside funding; Kean repudiated charges from the committee that he had issued a "blank check."

Kean claimed $49,366.30 in spending. Frelinghuysen claimed $48,774.97. Stokes testified that he had raised 16,355, of which he contributed $3,000 personally. He claimed to have spent only $14,609.

=== Results ===
1928 Republican U.S. Senate primary
Party	Candidate	Votes	%
Republican	Hamilton Fish Kean	167,029	33.57%
Republican	Edward C. Stokes	142,123	28.56%
Republican	Joseph S. Frelinghuysen	137,440	27.62%
Republican	Lillian Feickert	26,029	5.23%
Republican	Edward W. Gray	24,959	5.02%
Total votes		497,580	100.0%

On election night, the results were too close to call.

Robert Carey, a reformist Jersey City judge who lost the Republican nomination for Governor to Morgan F. Larson, quickly alleged that many Hudson County Democrats had voted in the Republican primary for Larson and Stokes as part of a deal with Democratic boss Frank Hague. Carey demanded an investigation by the state Attorney General, which Kean and Frelinghuysen seconded.

==== Results by county ====
County	Kean	%	Stokes	%	Frelinghuysen	%	Feickert	%	Gray	%	Total
Atlantic	22,672	70%	5,258	16%	2,600	8%	954	3%	906	3%	32,390
Bergen	13,107	31%	5,566	13%	17,355	41%	2,560	6%	3,349	8%	41,937
Burlington	5,125	27%	6,198	33%	5,088	27%	1,568	8%	1,051	6%	19,030
Camden	27,095	52%	9,416	18%	11,066	21%	2,610	5%	1,873	4%	52,060
Cape May	4,021	55%	1,678	23%	948	13%	480	7%	237	3%	7,364
Cumberland	1,468	9%	10,254	62%	3,314	20%	1,063	6%	417	3%	16,516
Essex	22,274	29%	19,926	26%	26,559	34%	3,272	4%	5,806	7%	77,837
Gloucester	3,801	25%	3,105	20%	7,495	49%	658	4%	358	2%	15,417
Hudson	9,049	19%	26,373	54%	9,808	20%	1,415	3%	2,070	4%	48,715
Hunterdon	707	18%	1,274	32%	1,599	40%	301	8%	107	3%	3,988
Mercer	1,753	8%	14,966	71%	2,966	14%	911	4%	625	3%	21,221
Middlesex	5,650	27%	7,448	35%	5,972	28%	1,247	6%	814	4%	21,131
Monmouth	8,091	43%	4,088	22%	4,547	24%	1,162	6%	881	5%	18,769
Morris	3,754	22%	5,502	33%	7,591	45%	1,588	9%	1,029	6%	16,847
Ocean	3,040	40%	1,372	18%	2,116	28%	340	5%	660	9%	7,528
Passaic	16,267	44%	7,807	21%	9,461	26%	1,234	3%	1,834	5%	36,603
Salem	1,258	25%	1,896	37%	1,258	25%	585	11%	109	2%	5,106
Somerset	1,093	12%	1,257	13%	5,764	62%	870	9%	339	4%	9,323
Sussex	536	21%	747	29%	892	34%	237	9%	184	7%	2,596
Union	15,409	42%	6,253	17%	9,933	27%	2,614	7%	2,141	6%	36,350
Warren	859	20%	1,739	41%	1,108	26%	360	9%	169	4%	4,235

=== Aftermath ===
The primary left a lasting rift in the state Republican Party. At the party convention weeks later, Stokes denounced "payroll politicians" and unsuccessfully called for a resolution to bar candidates from spending except on specific items, which he claimed would prevent the nomination from being "purchased." Frelinghuysen also demanded an investigation of Carey's charges against Hague, denouncing "those who pretended to be loyal Republicans but who traded with the Democratic bosses."

Frelinghuysen finally endorsed Kean in September, citing his friendship with Herbert Hoover and his support for the "progressive policies" of the Coolidge administration. He ran for Senate again in 1930 but finished a distant third in the primary to Dwight Morrow.

== General election ==
=== Candidates ===
- Charlotte L. Bohlin (Socialist)
- Edward I. Edwards (Democrat), incumbent Senator
- Hamilton Fish Kean (Republican), banker and member of the Republican National Committee
- Will D. Martin (Prohibition)
- Frank Sanders (Socialist Labor)
- Albert Weisbord (Workers)

=== Results ===
1928 United States Senate election in New Jersey
Party	Candidate	Votes	%
Republican	Hamilton Fish Kean	841,752	57.87%
Democratic	Edward I. Edwards (incumbent)	608,623	41.84%
Socialist	Charlotte L. Bohlin	2,267	0.16%
Workers	Albert Weisbrod	1,333	0.09%
Prohibition	Will D. Martin	372	0.03%
Socialist Labor	Frank Sanders	280	0.02%
Majority		232,129	16.03%
Turnout		1,454,627	
Republican gain from Democratic			

== See also ==
- 1928 United States Senate elections
