= Edward I. Edwards =

American politician (1863–1931)

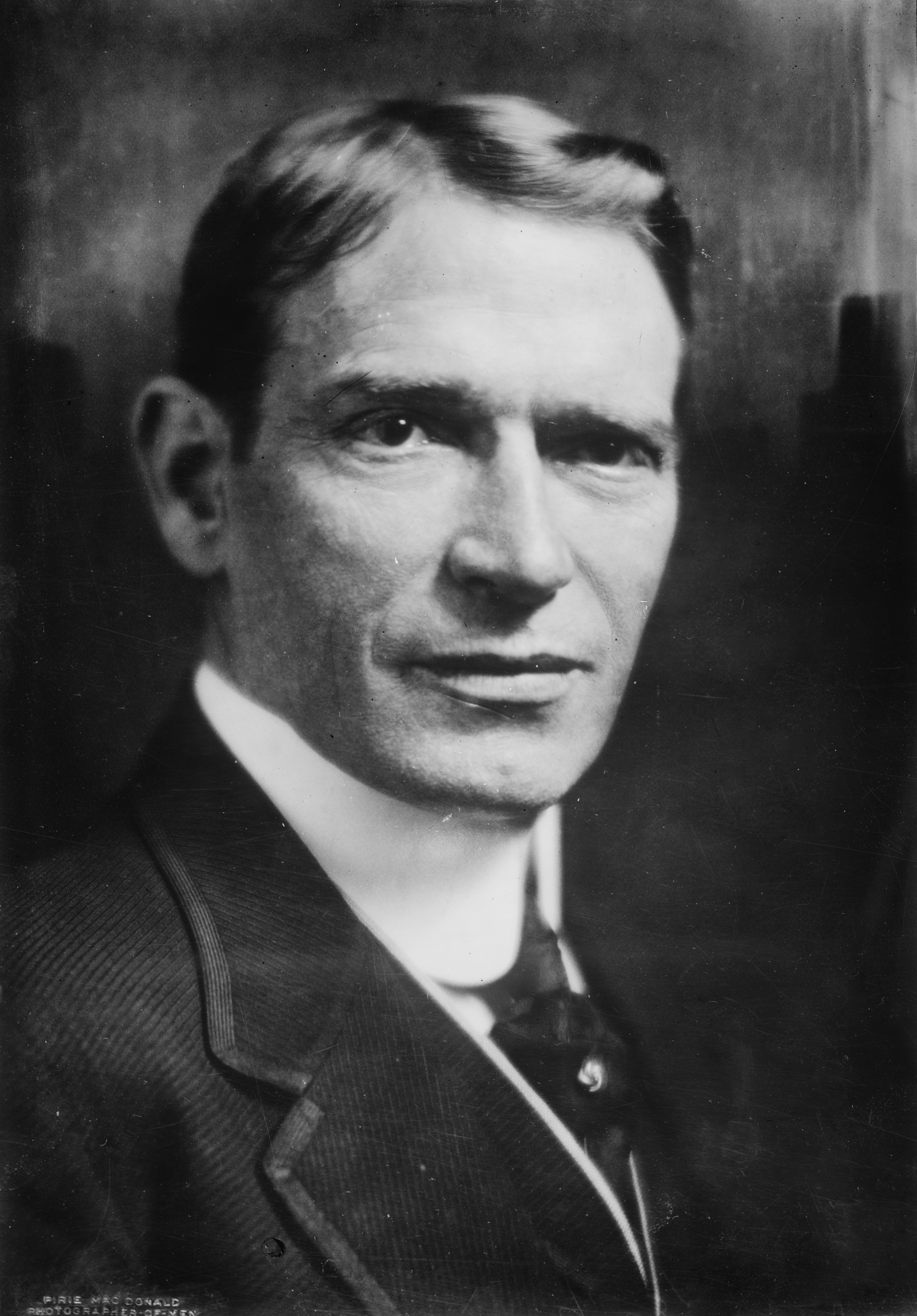
- Edwards c. 1918

United States Senator from New Jersey
- In office March 4, 1923 – March 3, 1929
- Preceded by: Joseph S. Frelinghuysen
- Succeeded by: Hamilton Fish Kean

37th Governor of New Jersey
- In office January 20, 1920 – January 15, 1923
- Preceded by: Clarence Edward Case (acting)
- Succeeded by: George Sebastian Silzer

Member of the New Jersey Senate from Hudson County
- In office January 1, 1919 – January 20, 1920

Personal details
- Born: Edward Irving Edwards; December 1, 1863 Jersey City, New Jersey, U.S.
- Died: January 26, 1931 (aged 67) Jersey City, New Jersey, U.S.
- Party: Democratic
- Spouse: Blanche Smith (1888-1928; her death)
- Children: 2
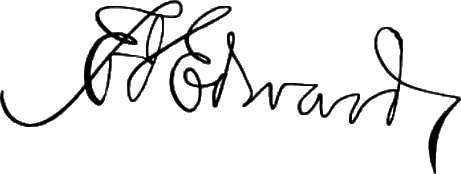
- Signature

Edward Irving Edwards (December 1, 1863 – January 26, 1931) was an American attorney, banker, and Democratic Party politician who served as the 37th governor of New Jersey from 1920 to 1923 and represented the state in the United States Senate from 1923 to 1929. He was a leading critic of Prohibition.

== Early life and career ==
Edwards was born on December 1, 1863, in Jersey City, New Jersey, the son of Emma J. (Nation) and William W. Edwards.

Edwards attended Jersey City High School (since renamed as William L. Dickinson High School) and attended New York University from 1880 to 1882. He later studied law in the office of his brother, William David Edwards, who also represented Hudson County in the State Senate from 1887 to 1889.

He engaged in banking and in the general contracting business. He later became president and chairman of the board of directors of the First National Bank of Jersey City. As a businessman with an interest in politics and a State Senator for a brother, he attracted the attention of the powerful Hudson County Democratic machine.

Edwards served as state comptroller from 1911 to 1917 and was elected to the New Jersey Senate in 1918. He became a friend and close political ally of Mayor Frank Hague, the boss of the Democratic machine.

== Governor of New Jersey (1920–23) ==
=== 1919 election ===
In the Democratic primary, his opponent was James R. Nugent, chair of the Essex County party and former state party boss. The campaign became a proxy for Frank Hague's struggle with Nugent for state power, and Edwards emerged victorious with 53.6 percent of the vote. He carried fifteen counties and a huge majority in Hudson County; Hague emerged as the undisputed leader of the New Jersey Democratic Party, which he would dominate through the late 1940s.

In the general election, Edwards faced Newton A.K. Bugbee. Despite Republican victories throughout the northeast in reaction to Wilson's unpopularity, nationwide labor and racial unrest, and anarchist terrorism, Edwards prevailed narrowly. With the exception of a Camden trolly strike, the New Jersey campaign focused on the single issue of the prohibition of alcohol, following the ratification of the Eighteenth Amendment to the United States Constitution in January 1919 and the passage of the Volstead Act over President Woodrow Wilson's veto on October 28. An Elizabeth daily newspaper dubbed Edwards's campaign the "Applejack Campaign," because although Edwards personally did not drink alcohol, he ran as an avowed "wet" opponent of prohibition. His victory was attributed to an urban political revolt by Catholic and ethnic immigrants, overcoming those groups' dissatisfaction with Wilson's proposal for the League of Nations. Historian Warren E. Stickle has referred to the election as the "Edwards Revolution," as it significantly reshaped New Jersey politics for the twentieth century and served a prelude to the New Deal coalition.

=== Term in office ===
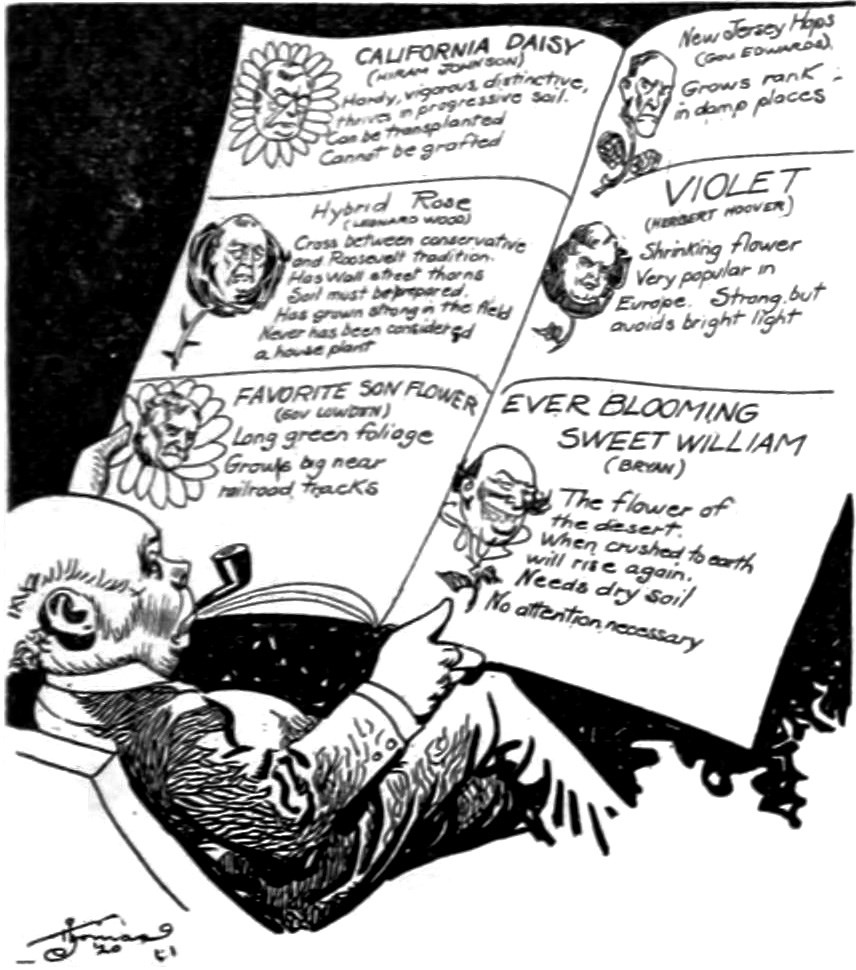
A June 1920 political cartoon satirizing the various contenders for the presidency as varieties of plant seed. Edwards is listed as "New Jersey Hops," a reference to his opposition to prohibition.

Edwards's time in office was defined by Republican domination of the state legislature; the State Senate, which then apportioned one vote per county, was dominated by rural and small-town interests which increasingly aligned with Republicans and against Edwards's urban base. Following the 1920 Republican landslide, the General Assembly was also dominated by Republicans—only one Democratic member was elected to serve in the legislature of 1921–22. Thus, Edwards played only a minor role in legislation as Governor; the Republican majorities frustrated much of his own program and repeatedly passed their own legislation over his veto, including the establishment of the Port Authority (which Edwards later supported) and the New Jersey State Police.

On prohibition, Edwards did briefly succeed in passing a bill which permitted the sale and manufacture of beverages with less than 3.5 percent alcohol content, which he signed on March 2, 1920; it was repealed in January 1921 and laws for the enforcement of prohibition were passed over Edwards's veto. With his legislative power cut off, Edwards instead exercised executive power by joining the state as a plaintiff in Rhode Island v. Palma, a challenge to the constitutionality of prohibition policies. He also called on Congress to modify the Volstead Act to permit the sale of light wines and beer. Because of his aggressive public stance against Prohibition, his name was entered in the Illinois and New Jersey presidential preference primaries in 1920; he won both.

Edwards also used his appointments power to fire the members of the Public Utility Commission as part of a fight for reduced rates, but the Republican legislature established a new commission over his veto. He also opposed blue laws which restricted activity on Sundays and supported the arrangement of boxing matches in the state against moral objections.

== United States Senator (1923–29) ==
With his term in office expiring in 1923, Edwards spent his final year as Governor running for the United States Senate against incumbent Senator Joseph S. Frelinghuysen. Running on a slogan of "Wine, Women, and Song," Edwards ran against the Republican platform of "100-percent Americanism, blue laws, Sunday closing laws, compulsory English lessons, immigration restriction, and prohibition." He carried the race over Frelinghuysen by a convincing margin, dramatically reversing President Harding's landslide victory by re-establishing and enlarging his 1919 coalition. His victory also further established Frank Hague's domination over the party.

In 1928, Edwards ran for re-election to the Senate, continuing to emphasize his opposition to Prohibition. His opponent, Hamilton Fish Kean, however, came out publicly for modification of the Volstead Act and, in early October, declared himself as opposed to Prohibition as Edwards. Though the Anti-Saloon League revoked its endorsement of Kean, he won in a landslide, helped by a general feeling of prosperity associated with Republican President Calvin Coolidge and rural opposition to the more urban Democratic coalition.

== Personal life ==
Edwards married Blanche Smith on November 14, 1888. They had two children, Edward Irving Jr. and Elizabeth Jule. She died in 1928.

He was a member of the Episcopal Church and a Freemason.

== Later life and death ==
Following his wife's death and his departure from office in March 1929, Edwards's fortunes continued to decline. He went broke in the Wall Street Crash of 1929 and was implicated in an electoral fraud scandal. Politically, he broke with Frank Hague and threatened to join the reform coalition against Hague in the 1930 election. He initially sought to run for Governor in 1931, but found himself blocked by Hague's preferred choice, A. Harry Moore.

Edwards was diagnosed with skin cancer and shot himself dead in his apartment at 131 Kensington Avenue in Jersey City, New Jersey on January 26, 1931. He was 67 years old. He was buried in Bayview – New York Bay Cemetery in the plot of his older brother, William David Edwards, who died in 1916.

== See also ==
- List of governors of New Jersey

Political offices
Preceded by Clarence Edward Case; Acting Governor	Governor of New Jersey; January 20, 1920 – January 15, 1923	Succeeded by George Sebastian Silzer
U.S. Senate
Preceded by Joseph S. Frelinghuysen	U.S. Senator (Class 1) from New Jersey; March 4, 1923 – March 4, 1929	Succeeded by Hamilton Fish Kean
Party political offices
Preceded by H. Otto Wittpenn	Democratic Nominee for Governor of New Jersey; 1919	Succeeded by George Sebastian Silzer
Preceded by James E. Martine	Democratic Nominee for the U.S. Senate (Class 1) from New Jersey; 1922, 1928	Succeeded by A. Harry Moore
