= Newton A.K. Bugbee =

American politician and businessman

Newton Albert Kendall Bugbee
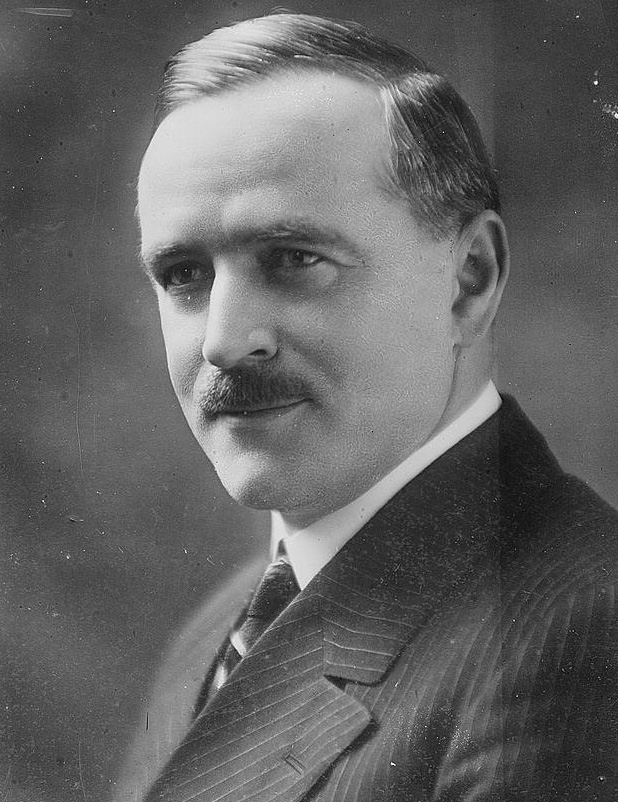

Chair of the New Jersey Republican State Committee
- In office 1913–1917

Personal details
- Born: April 21, 1876 Minneapolis, Minnesota, U.S.
- Died: June 1, 1965 (aged 89) Trenton, New Jersey, U.S.
- Parent(s): Alvin Newton Bugbee; Lucy Kendall Davis

Newton Albert Kendall Bugbee (April 21, 1876 – June 1965) was an American businessman and Republican Party politician who served as New Jersey State Comptroller and Chairman of the New Jersey Republican State Committee. He was also the Republican candidate for Governor of New Jersey in 1919.

== Early life ==
Bugbee was born on April 21, 1876 in Minneapolis, Minnesota to Alvin Newton Bugbee and Lucy Kendall Davis. He was raised in Templeton, Massachusetts and graduated from high school there. At an early age he went to work for the Edge Moor Bridge Works of Wilmington, Delaware, joining their engineering department and remaining there for two years. He then settled in Trenton, New Jersey, working as a draftsman for the New Jersey Steel and Iron Company, which was acquired by the American Bridge Company in 1900. He remained with this company until 1903, when he resigned and formed his own engineering and contracting firm, N.A.K. Bugbee and Company. The firm specialized in structural steel developments in buildings and bridges. He married Florence Hancock Toms on October 9, 1900.

As a young man newly arrived in Trenton, Bugbee played for the Trenton Basketball Team (1896-1897), now recognized as the first professional basketball team. They played their first game on November 7, 1896 against the Brooklyn YMCA, winning 16-1. Bugbee played "side center" and scored the first field goal.

== Political career ==
Bugbee was active in Trenton civic life and New Jersey Republican politics. He became Chairman of the New Jersey Republican State Committee in 1913 after the death of Frank Obadiah Briggs. In 1917, in the administration of Governor Walter Evans Edge, Bugbee was named State Comptroller, a position he would hold for twelve years.

Bugbee resigned from the party chairmanship to run for Governor of New Jersey in 1919. The paramount issue in that election year was Prohibition, since the Eighteenth Amendment had already been ratified but would not be enforced until the beginning of 1920. In the Republican primary Bugbee faced William Nelson Runyon, who had served as Acting Governor following Edge's election to the United States Senate, and Thomas L. Raymond, mayor of Newark. Runyon ran as a "dry" (supporting Prohibition), Raymond ran as a "wet" (opposing Prohibition), while Bugbee took a middle position. With the support of local party machinery, particularly in southern counties, Bugbee defeated Runyon and Raymond by a margin of 38%-34%-23%, with the remaining 4% going to Warren C. King, a relative unknown from Middlesex County.

The general election campaign against Democratic candidate Edward I. Edwards would continue to focus on the polarizing issue of Prohibition, so much so that it was known as "The Applejack Campaign." (Applejack is an alcoholic drink made from hard cider, long associated with New Jersey.) Edwards was strongly anti-Prohibition, proclaiming himself "as wet as the Atlantic Ocean." Though he was a social drinker who occasionally drank beer in public, Bugbee maintained that Prohibition must be enforced at the risk of lawlessness, even going so far as to label Edwards a Bolshevik and an anarchist. Edwards defeated Bugbee by a 49%-46% margin, as urban residents and immigrant groups shifted to the Democratic Party as a result of the Prohibition issue.

Bugbee served as Comptroller until the end of his term in 1929. He continued his business career with his engineering firm in Trenton, also becoming the director of the Trenton Savings Fund Society and the first president of the Hanover Trust Company of Trenton.

His wife died in 1937. He died in June 1965 at the age of 89 in Trenton, New Jersey.

Party political offices
Preceded by Frank O. Briggs	Chairman of the New Jersey Republican State Committee; 1913–1919	Succeeded by Edward C. Stokes
Preceded by Walter Evans Edge	Republican Nominee for Governor of New Jersey; 1919	Succeeded by William Nelson Runyon
