= Grover Cleveland Park =

Park in New Jersey, United States

Coordinates: 40°50′4″N 74°16′58″W

Grover Cleveland Park in the winter

Grover Cleveland Park, the seventh-largest park in the Essex County, New Jersey, USA, county-park system, is a heavily wooded park covering 41.48 acres (167,900 m^{2}) in the western section of Essex County along the Caldwell-Essex Fells border.

The park was conceived with a formal design with manicured lawns, well-spaced large trees, and 3 acres (12,000 m^{2}) of waterways, including Pine Brook Creek, which runs through the park feeding a small pond at the lower end. A small footbridge at the far end of the pond was the location of a one-time sawmill. Several foot bridges connect the two areas of the park divided by the stream.

The park was acquired between 1913 and 1916 and is named after President Grover Cleveland who was born in Caldwell, and was the 22nd and 24th President of the United States.

The Olmsted Brothers were asked to create a plan for recreation use of most of the park area. By the summer of 1914, development of recreation facilities — including tennis courts, baseball fields, a playground, sand court, wading pool, and a shelter house to service these facilities — was underway, with improvements completed for public use by 1916.

Park features include lighted tennis courts, shuffleboard courts, horseshoe pitches, fieldhouse, baseball field, summer concert activities, playground, fishing, jogging walkways, picnic grove, and ice skating.

The tennis and pickleball courts at Grover Cleveland Park were reopened in July 2023, providing the community with enhanced recreational opportunities.
