= 1919 New Jersey gubernatorial election =

- November 4, 1919
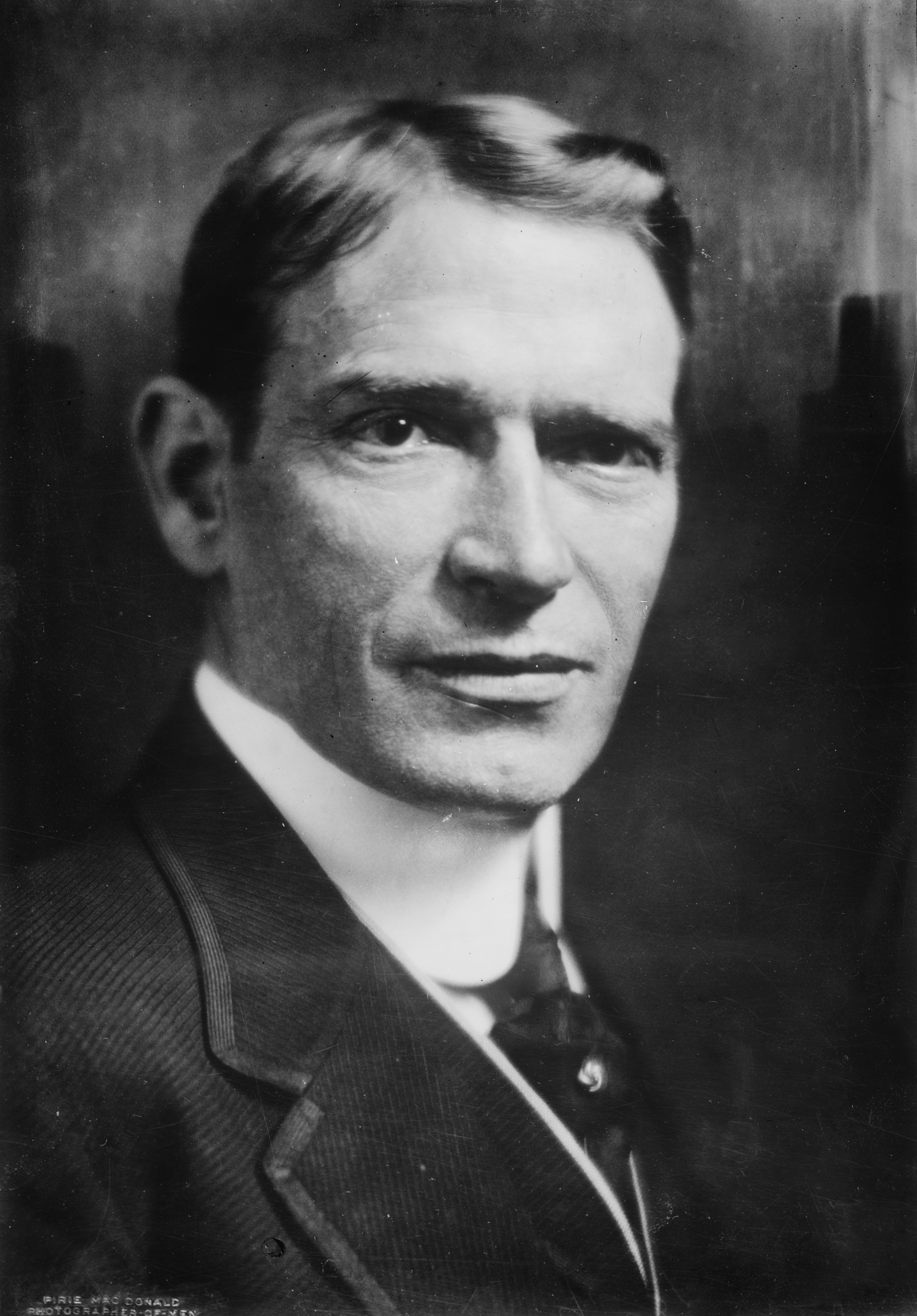

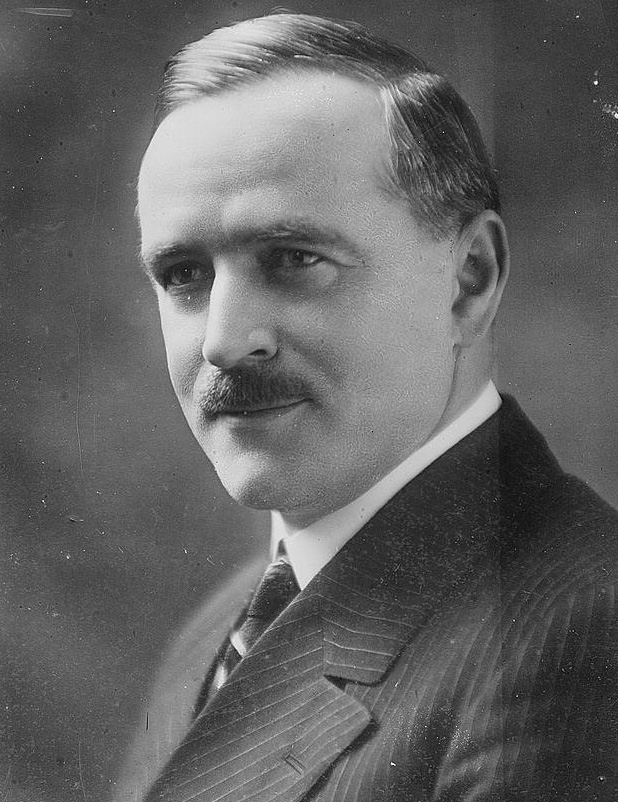
Nominee	Edward I. Edwards	Newton A.K. Bugbee
Party	Democratic	Republican
Popular vote	217,486	202,976
Percentage	49.20%	45.92%
- County results Edwards: 40–50% 50–60% 60–70% Bugbee: 40–50% 50–60% 60–70%
Governor before election
Clarence E. Case (acting)
Republican
Elected Governor
Edward I. Edwards
Democratic

The 1919 New Jersey gubernatorial election was held on November 4, 1919. Democratic nominee Edward I. Edwards defeated Republican nominee Newton A.K. Bugbee with 49.20% of the vote.

== Republican primary ==
=== Candidates ===
- Newton A.K. Bugbee, New Jersey comptroller and former chair of the New Jersey Republican Party
- Warren C. King, businessman and president of the New Jersey Manufacturers' Council
- Thomas Lynch Raymond, former mayor of Newark
- William N. Runyon, state senator from Union County and acting governor

=== Results ===
Republican primary results
Party	Candidate	Votes	%
Republican	Newton A.K. Bugbee	64,245	38.07%
Republican	William N. Runyon (incumbent)	57,876	34.29%
Republican	Thomas Lynch Raymond	39,373	23.33%
Republican	Warren C. King	7,276	4.31%
Total votes		168,770	100.00

== Democratic primary ==
=== Candidates ===
- Edward I. Edwards, state senator from Hudson County and former New Jersey comptroller
- Frank M. McDermitt, attorney and perennial candidate from Newark
- James R. Nugent, city counsel for Newark, chair of the Essex County Democratic organization, and former chair of the New Jersey Democratic Party

=== Results ===
Republican primary results
Party	Candidate	Votes	%
Democratic	Edward I. Edwards	56,261	53.60%
Democratic	James R. Nugent	43,612	41.55%
Democratic	Frank M. McDermitt	5,095	4.85%
Total votes		104,968	100.00

== General election ==
=== Candidates ===
- Newton A.K. Bugbee, New Jersey comptroller and former chair of the New Jersey Republican Party (Republican)
- John C. Butterworth (Socialist Labor)
- Mark M. Denterfass (Single Tax)
- Edward I. Edwards, state senator from Hudson County and former New Jersey comptroller (Democratic)
- Albert Farr (Socialist)
- Charles E. Lane (Prohibition)

==== Withdrew ====
- Fillmore Condit, former Essex County freeholder (Anti-Saloon League) (endorsed Bugbee)

=== Results ===
New Jersey gubernatorial election, 1919
Party	Candidate	Votes	%	±%
Democratic	Edward I. Edwards	217,486	49.20%	
Republican	Newton A.K. Bugbee	202,976	45.92%	
Socialist	Albert Farr	11,014	2.49%	
Prohibition	Charles E. Lane	6,089	1.38%	
Socialist Labor	John C. Butterworth	3,243	0.73%	
Independent	Mark M. Denterfass	1,246	0.28%	
Majority				
Turnout				
Democratic gain from Republican		Swing		
