= Hamilton F. Kean =

American politician

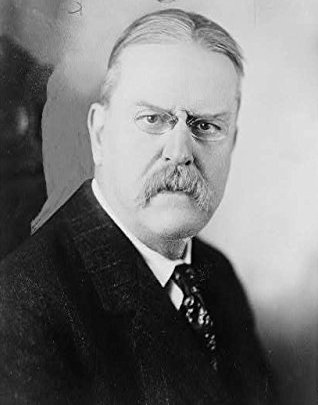

United States Senator from New Jersey
- In office March 4, 1929 – January 3, 1935
- Preceded by: Edward I. Edwards
- Succeeded by: A. Harry Moore

Personal details
- Born: Hamilton Fish Kean; February 27, 1862 Elizabeth, New Jersey, US
- Died: December 27, 1941 (aged 79) New York City, US
- Party: Republican
- Spouse: Katharine Taylor Winthrop (m. 1888)
- Relations: Caleb O. Halsted (grandfather); John Kean (brother)
- Children: John Kean; Robert Winthrop Kean
- Parent(s): John Kean; Lucinetta Halsted
- Education: St. Paul's School

Hamilton Fish Kean (February 27, 1862 – December 27, 1941) was a U.S. senator from New Jersey.

== Early life ==
Kean was the son of Lucy (née Halsted) and Col. John Kean. He was related to several prominent American politicians including his great-grandfather John Kean (1756–1795), who served in Congress under the Articles of Confederation, and his brother, fellow U.S. Senator John Kean (1852–1914). His maternal grandfather was Caleb O. Halsted, president of the Bank of the Manhattan Company. He was named after his great-uncle, U.S. Senator and future U.S. Secretary of State Hamilton Fish.

Kean was born at "Ursino", his ancestral estate near Elizabeth, New Jersey. He attended the public schools of Elizabeth, graduated from St. Paul's School, Concord, New Hampshire.

== Career ==
Kean engaged in banking and agricultural pursuits. In 1893, along with Robert V. Van Cortlandt he formed the investment firm of Kean & Van Cortlandt, which later became Kean, Taylor & Co.

From 1919 to 1928, Kean was a member of the Republican National Committee. He was an unsuccessful candidate for the Republican nomination for United States Senator in 1924 and was elected to the Senate in 1928, serving a single six-year term before a failed re-election bid, losing to Governor A. Harry Moore.

After his political career, he worked in banking until his death in 1941. Kean was elected to the Board of Directors of the National Commercial Title and Mortgage Guarantee Company, the Associated Company, the Lawyers Title Guarantee Company of New Jersey, and the Plainfield-Union Water Company

== Personal life ==
On January 12, 1888, Kean was married to Katharine Taylor Winthrop (1866–1943). Katharine was the daughter of banker Robert Winthrop and Katherine (née Taylor) Winthrop and the sister of Beekman Winthrop, who served as Asst. Secretary of the Navy and Asst. Secretary of the Treasury. The Winthrops were descendants of John Winthrop, the Puritan lawyer and one of the leading figures in the founding of the Massachusetts Bay Colony. Together, they were the parents of:

- John Kean (1888–1949)
- Robert Winthrop Kean (1893–1980), who married Elizabeth Stuyvesant Howard (1898–1988).

Kean died on December 27, 1941, at St. Luke's Hospital in New York City. After a funeral at Grace Church in New York, he was interred in Green-Wood Cemetery in Brooklyn.

U.S. Senate
| Preceded by Edward I. Edwards | U.S. Senator (Class 1) from New Jersey; 1929–1935 | Succeeded by A. Harry Moore |
Party political offices
| Preceded by Joseph Sherman Frelinghuysen, Sr. | Republican Nominee for the U.S. Senate (Class 1) from New Jersey; 1928, 1934 | Succeeded by W. Warren Barbour |
