= Frank Knox =

47th Secretary of the Navy of the United States (1874–1944)

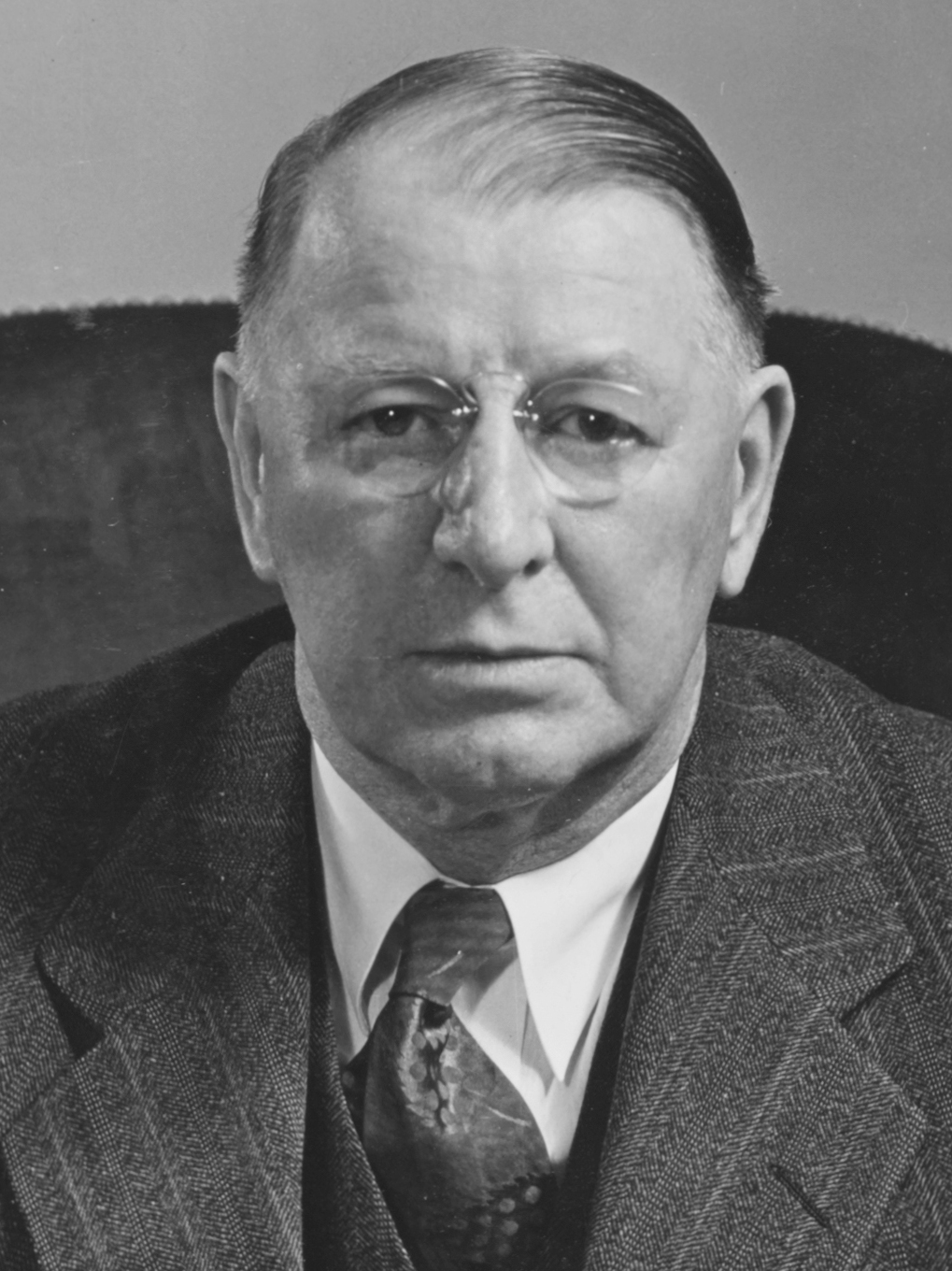
- Knox, c. 1943

47th United States Secretary of the Navy
- In office July 11, 1940 – April 28, 1944
- President: Franklin D. Roosevelt
- Preceded by: Charles Edison
- Succeeded by: James Forrestal

Chair of the Michigan Republican Party
- In office 1910–1912
- Preceded by: Gerrit J. Diekema
- Succeeded by: Alex J. Groesbeck

Personal details
- Born: William Franklin Knox; January 1, 1874 Boston, Massachusetts, U.S.
- Died: April 28, 1944 (aged 70) Washington, D.C., U.S.
- Resting place: Arlington National Cemetery
- Party: Republican
- Spouse: Annie Reid
- Education: Alma College (BA)

Military service
- Allegiance: United States
- Branch/service: United States Army
- Years of service: 1898; 1917–1919
- Rank: Colonel
- Battles/wars: Spanish–American War • Battle of Las Guasimas • Battle of San Juan Hill; World War I

William Franklin Knox (January 1, 1874 – April 28, 1944) was an American politician, soldier, newspaper editor, and publisher. He was the Republican vice presidential candidate in 1936 and Secretary of the Navy under Franklin D. Roosevelt during most of World War II.

Born in Boston, he attended Alma College and was a member of Troop K with the Rough Riders during the Spanish–American War. After the war, he became a newspaper editor in Grand Rapids, Michigan, and state chairman of the Republican Party. He was a leading supporter of Theodore Roosevelt, the Progressive candidate for president in 1912. He advocated U.S. entrance into World War I and served as an artillery officer in France. The 1936 Republican National Convention nominated a ticket of Alf Landon and Knox, and they were defeated by Roosevelt and John Nance Garner in the 1936 election.

After World War II broke out in 1939, Knox supported aid to the Allies. In 1940, Roosevelt appointed him as Secretary of the Navy in hopes of building bipartisan support. Knox brought in James Forrestal as the under secretary. They presided over a massive naval buildup but were dissatisfied by the confused chain of command in Hawaii. After the attack on Pearl Harbor, Knox brought in a much more aggressive admiral, Ernest J. King. Roosevelt worked closely with King and largely neglected Knox. During the war, Knox continued his supervision of the Chicago Daily News, while Forrestal expanded his role and supervised the nonmilitary aspects of the department in terms of contracts and recruitment. Knox served as secretary of the Navy until his death in 1944, when Forrestal replaced him.

== Early life ==
William Franklin Knox was born in Boston, Massachusetts. His parents were both Canadian; his mother, Sarah C. (Barnard), was from Charlottetown, Prince Edward Island, and his father, William Edwin Knox, was from New Brunswick. When he was nine, his family moved to Grand Rapids, Michigan, where his father ran a grocery store. He attended Alma College in Michigan, where he was a member of the Zeta Sigma fraternity. He left in his senior year to join the US Army for the Spanish–American War. He later supplemented his studies with additional readings and coursework, and the college's board of trustees awarded him a Bachelor of Arts degree as a member of the class of 1898.

He served in Cuba with Theodore Roosevelt's famous Rough Riders, the 1st United States Volunteer Cavalry Regiment. He was a member of Troop D commanded by Captain Robert Huston. As a member of D Troop, Knox fought in Cuba at the Battle of Las Guasimas, and the Battle of San Juan Hill.

== Newspapers and politics ==
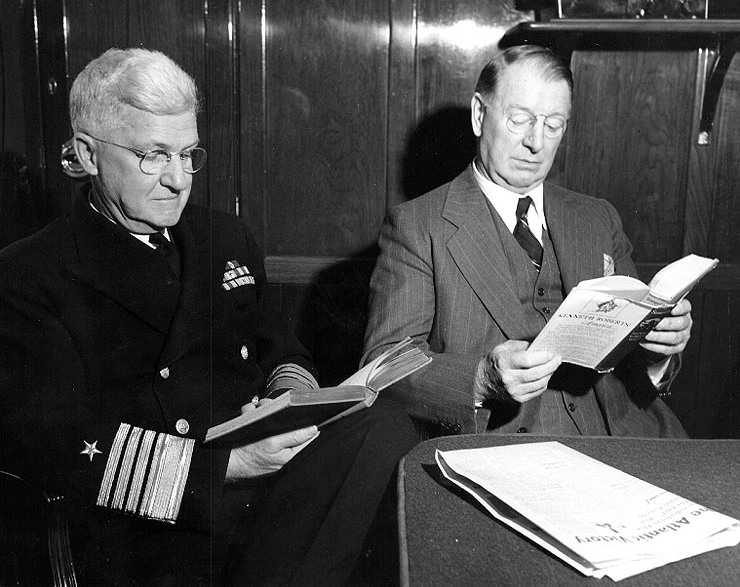
Admiral Harold R. Stark and Secretary Knox reading on a train in England in 1943

After the war, Knox became a newspaper reporter in Grand Rapids, which was the beginning of a career that included ownership of several papers. He changed his first name to Frank around 1900. He was state chairman of the Michigan Republican Party. In 1912, he was a key organizer for the presidential ambitions of Theodore Roosevelt.

In late 1912, Knox helped found the Manchester Leader in New Hampshire. It was financed by Governor Robert P. Bass, a member of the Progressive or Bull Moose Party). The newspaper was so successful that Knox bought out the Manchester Union. The two newspapers merged under the banner of the Union-Leader Corporation July 1913. Both papers espoused a moderate Republican, probusiness stance.

During World War I, Knox was an advocate of U.S. military preparedness and then of participation in the war. When the U.S. declared war on Germany in 1917, he rejoined the Army. He reached the rank of Colonel and served as an artillery officer in France. After the war he returned to the newspaper business.

In 1931, Frank Knox became publisher and part owner of the Chicago Daily News. In the 1936 election, he was the Republican nominee for vice president under Alf Landon. Landon, Knox, and former President Herbert Hoover were the only supporters of Theodore Roosevelt in 1912 who were later named to a Republican ticket. They lost in a landslide, winning just Maine and Vermont against the Democratic ticket of President Franklin D. Roosevelt and Vice President John Nance Garner.

== World War II ==
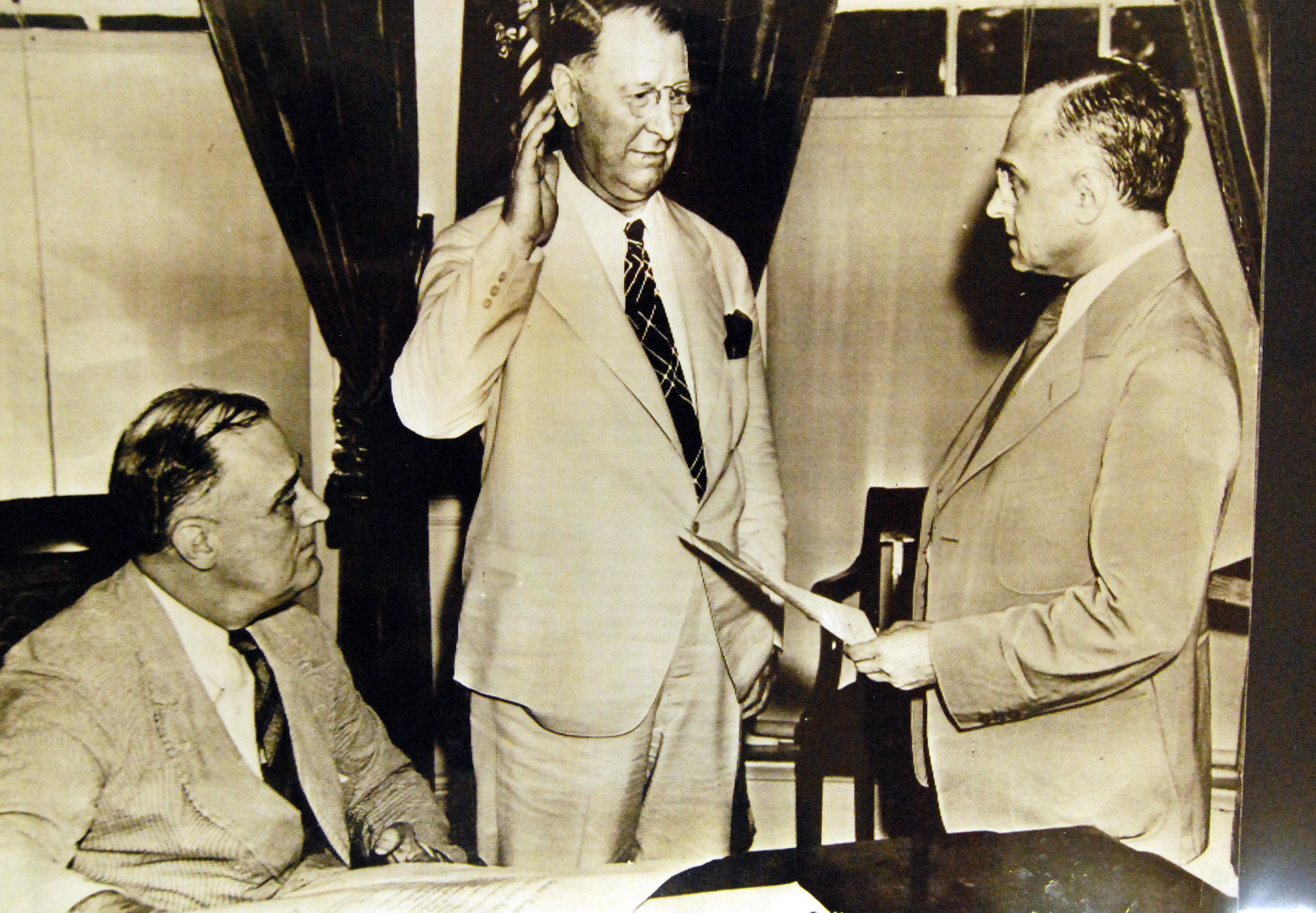
Supreme Court Justice Felix Frankfurter administers the oath of office to Knox as Secretary of the Navy at the White House, as President Franklin D. Roosevelt looks on (July 11, 1940).

During World War II, Knox again was an advocate of preparedness. As an internationalist, he supported aid to the Allies and opposed isolationism. In July 1940, he became secretary of the Navy under Roosevelt with Henry L. Stimson as Secretary of War, part of the Democratic president's effort to build bipartisan support for his foreign and defense policies following the defeat of France. Knox carried out Roosevelt's plan to expand the US Navy into a force capable of fighting in both the Atlantic and the Pacific oceans. Knox was mentioned by name in Adolf Hitler's speech of December 11, 1941, in which Hitler stated a German declaration of war against the United States.

When a new naval officer on Knox's staff told him, "I'm no New Dealer", Knox replied, "I fought the President with every resource at my command. But now I've squared my politics with my conscience and I'm proud to serve under such a great man. At that," Knox added, "it's a good thing to have a couple of fellows around here who aren't New Dealers!" He traveled extensively to Navy installations worldwide. Knox also supported the continued racial segregation in the United States Armed Forces.

=== Internment of Japanese Americans ===
Knox had called for the internment of Japanese Americans as early as 1933, and he continued to do so in his new position. Shortly after the attack on Pearl Harbor, he visited Hawaii to investigate the sabotage that he believed to have taken place there. Upon his return, he issued a public statement that "the most effective Fifth Column work of the entire war was done in Hawaii with the exception of Norway", and he accused Japanese Hawaiians of impeding US defense efforts in a report to the President. Although the FBI and military intelligence later disproved those claims, Knox continued to push for the internment of Japanese Americans and barred them from service in the Navy during the war.

== Death ==
Following a brief series of heart attacks, Secretary Knox died in Washington, D.C., on April 28, 1944, while in office. He was buried on May 1, 1944, at Arlington National Cemetery, in Arlington, Virginia.

== Posthumous honors and memorials ==
The Gearing-class destroyer USS Frank Knox (DD-742), commissioned in December 1944, was named in his honor.

On May 31, 1945, he received posthumously the Medal for Merit from President Harry S. Truman. He also received the Spanish Campaign Medal and the World War I Victory Medal for his previous military service.

In 1948, his widow, Annie Reid Knox (1875–1958) endowed the Frank Knox Memorial Fellowships, which allow scholars from Australia, Canada, New Zealand, the Union of South Africa, and the United Kingdom to pursue graduate study at Harvard University, or by recent graduates of Harvard to travel and research in the countries of the British Commonwealth of Nations.

Frank Knox School on the grounds of the Patuxent River Naval Air Station was named for him.

== See also ==
- List of U.S. political appointees who crossed party lines
- Ed J. Davenport, handled public relations for Frank Knox, 1929–32

== Sources ==
This article incorporates text in the public domain from the United States Department of the Navy.

- Beasley, Norman. Frank Knox, American: a short biography (1936) online
- Jordan, Jonathan W., American Warlords: How Roosevelt's High Command Led America to Victory in World War II (NAL/Caliber 2015).
- Lobdell, George H. "Frank Knox, 11 July 1940–28 April 1944." in Paolo E. Coletta, ed. American Secretaries of the Navy, Volume II, 1913–1972 (1980) pp. 677–728
- Lobdell, George Henry Jr. "A Biography of Frank Knox" (PhD dissertation, University of Illinois at Urbana-Champaign ProQuest Dissertations Publishing, 1954. 0009101).
- Mark, Steven Macdonald." An American Interventionist: Frank Knox and United States Foreign Relations' (PhD dissertation, University of Maryland, College Park ProQuest Dissertations Publishing, 1977. 7730543).
- O'Sullivan, Christopher D. "Frank Knox: Roughrider in FDR's War Cabinet" (2023) Palgrave-Macmillan Publishers.

Party political offices
Preceded by Charles Curtis	Republican nominee for Vice President of the United States; 1936	Succeeded by Charles L. McNary
Political offices
Preceded by Charles Edison	United States Secretary of the Navy; 1940–1944	Succeeded by James Forrestal
