= 1936 Republican National Convention =

American political convention

Coordinates: 41.504°N 81.693°W

- 1936 presidential election
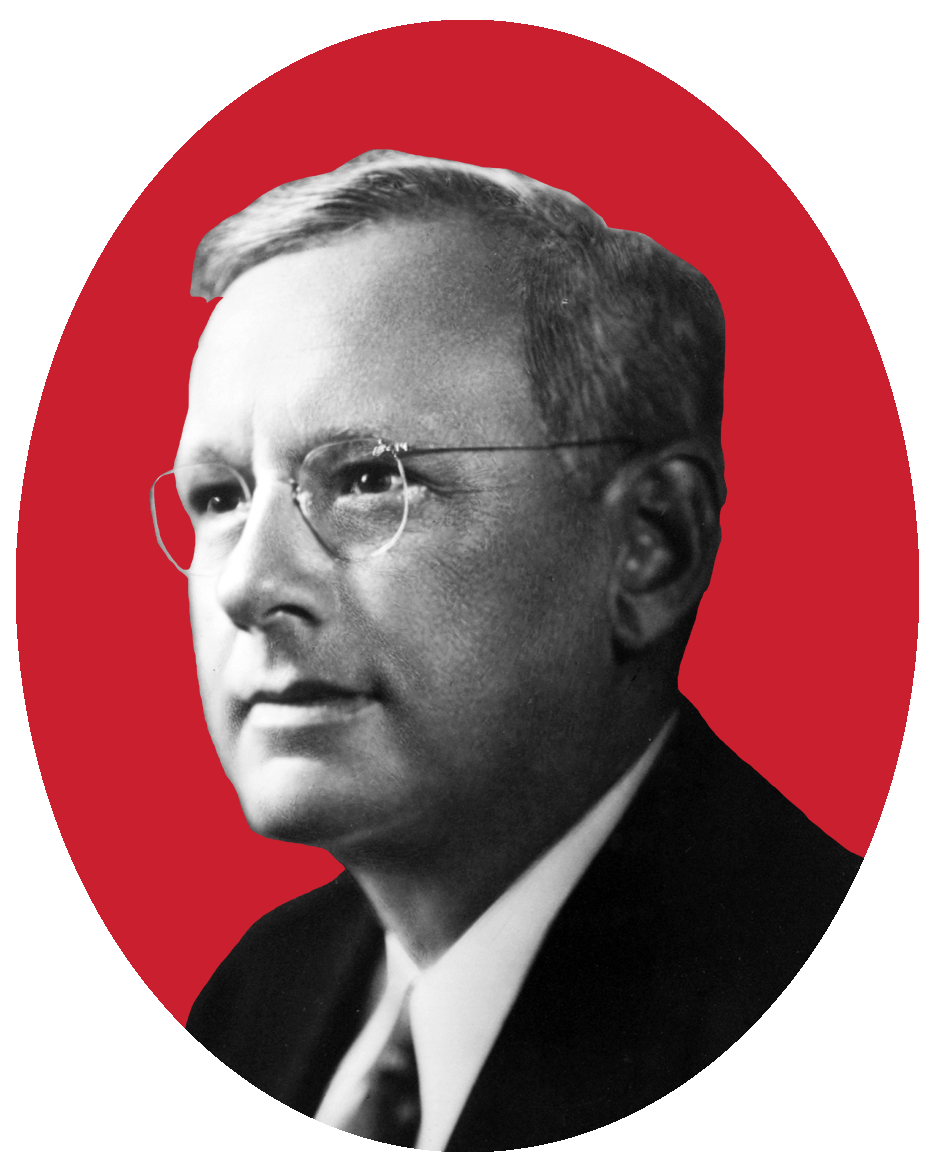
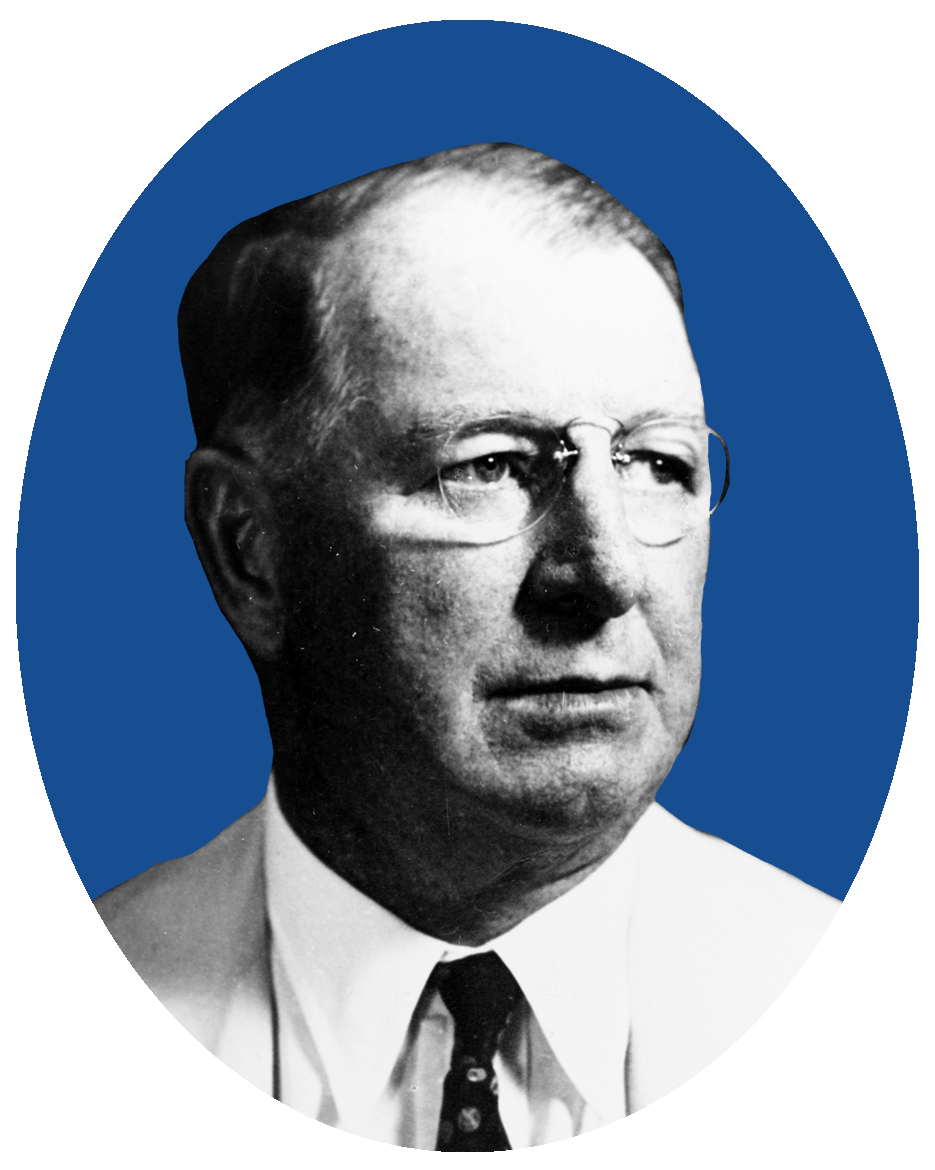
- Nominees; Landon and Knox

Convention
- Dates: June 9–12, 1936
- City: Cleveland, Ohio
- Venue: Public Auditorium
- Keynote speaker: Frederick Steiwer; U.S. Senator, Oregon

Candidates
- Presidential nominee: Alf Landon of Kansas
- Vice-presidential nominee: Frank Knox of Illinois
- Other candidates: William Borah of Idaho
- Results (president): Landon 984, Borah 19

The 1936 Republican National Convention was held June 9–12 at the Public Auditorium in Cleveland, Ohio. It nominated Governor Alfred Landon of Kansas for president and Frank Knox of Illinois for vice president.

The convention supported many New Deal programs, including Social Security. The keynote address was given on June 9 by Frederick Steiwer, U.S. Senator from Oregon.

== Background ==
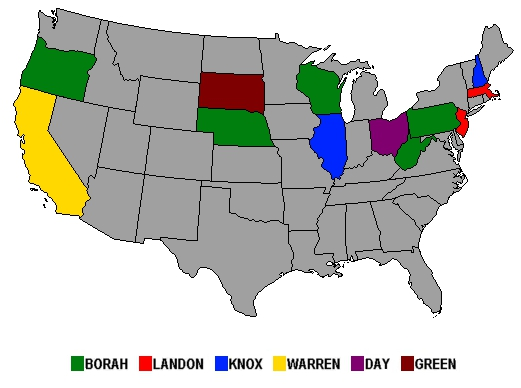
Republican primaries by state results

Although many candidates sought the Republican nomination, only two, Governor Landon and Senator William Borah of Idaho, were considered to be serious candidates. Although favorite sons County Attorney Earl Warren of California, Governor Warren E. Green of South Dakota, and Stephen A. Day of Ohio won their respective primaries, the 70-year-old Borah, a well-known progressive and "insurgent," carried the Wisconsin, Nebraska, Pennsylvania, West Virginia, and Oregon primaries, while also performing quite strongly in Knox's Illinois and Green's South Dakota. However, the party machinery almost uniformly backed Landon, a wealthy businessman and centrist, who won primaries in Massachusetts and New Jersey and dominated in the caucuses and at state party conventions.

Other potential candidates included Robert A. Taft, New York Representative James W. Wadsworth, Jr., Michigan Senator Arthur Vandenberg, Iowa Senator Lester Dickinson, New York Representative Hamilton Fish III, New Jersey Governor Harold Hoffman, Delaware Governor C. Douglass Buck, Supreme Court Justice Owen Roberts, Michigan auto magnate Henry Ford, aviator Charles Lindbergh, former President Herbert Hoover, Oregon Senator Frederick Steiwer, Senate Minority Leader Charles McNary, former Treasury Secretary Ogden L. Mills and Theodore Roosevelt, Jr., cousin of Democratic incumbent Franklin D. Roosevelt.

== Presidential nomination ==
=== Presidential candidates ===
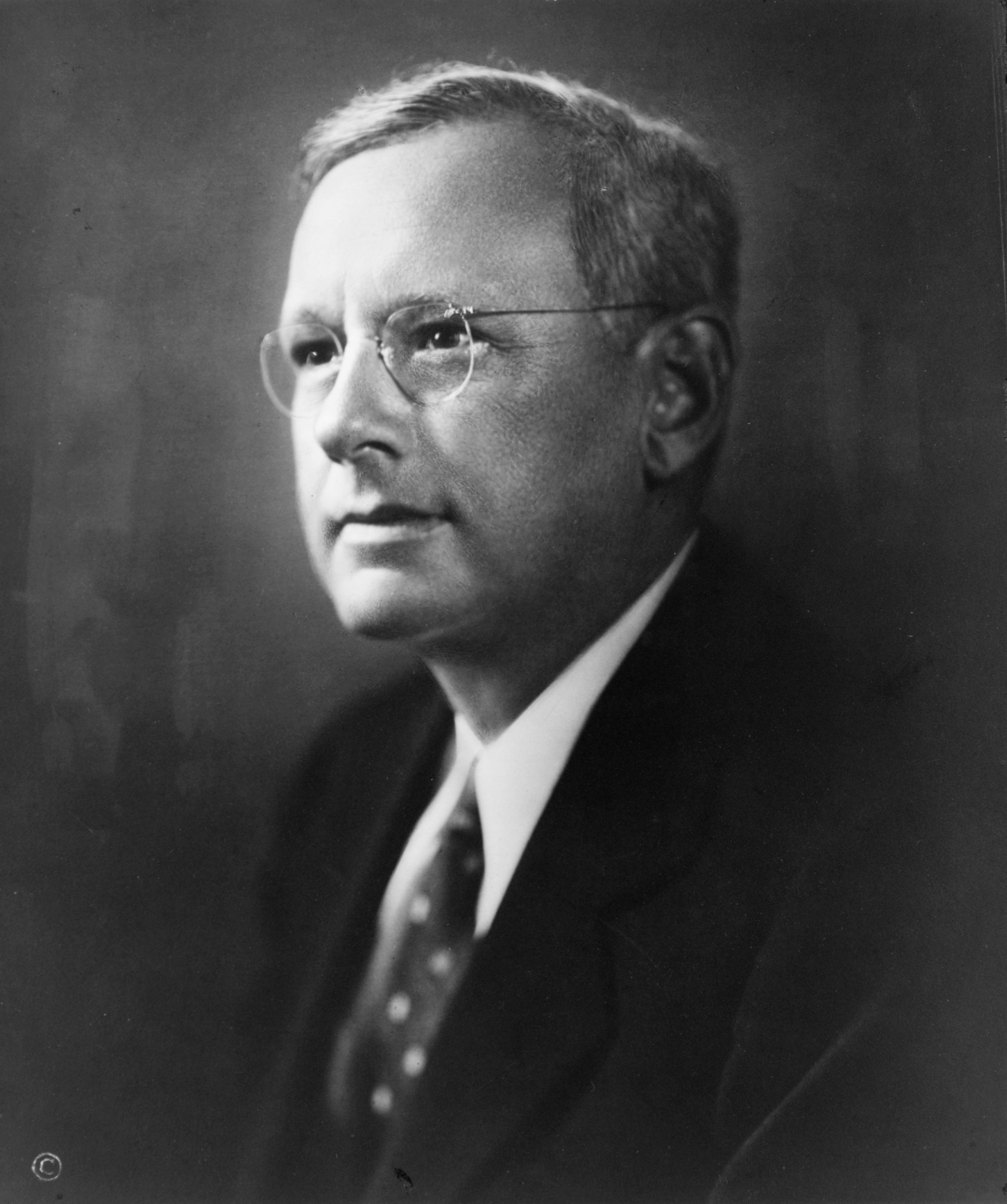
Governor
Alf Landon
of Kansas

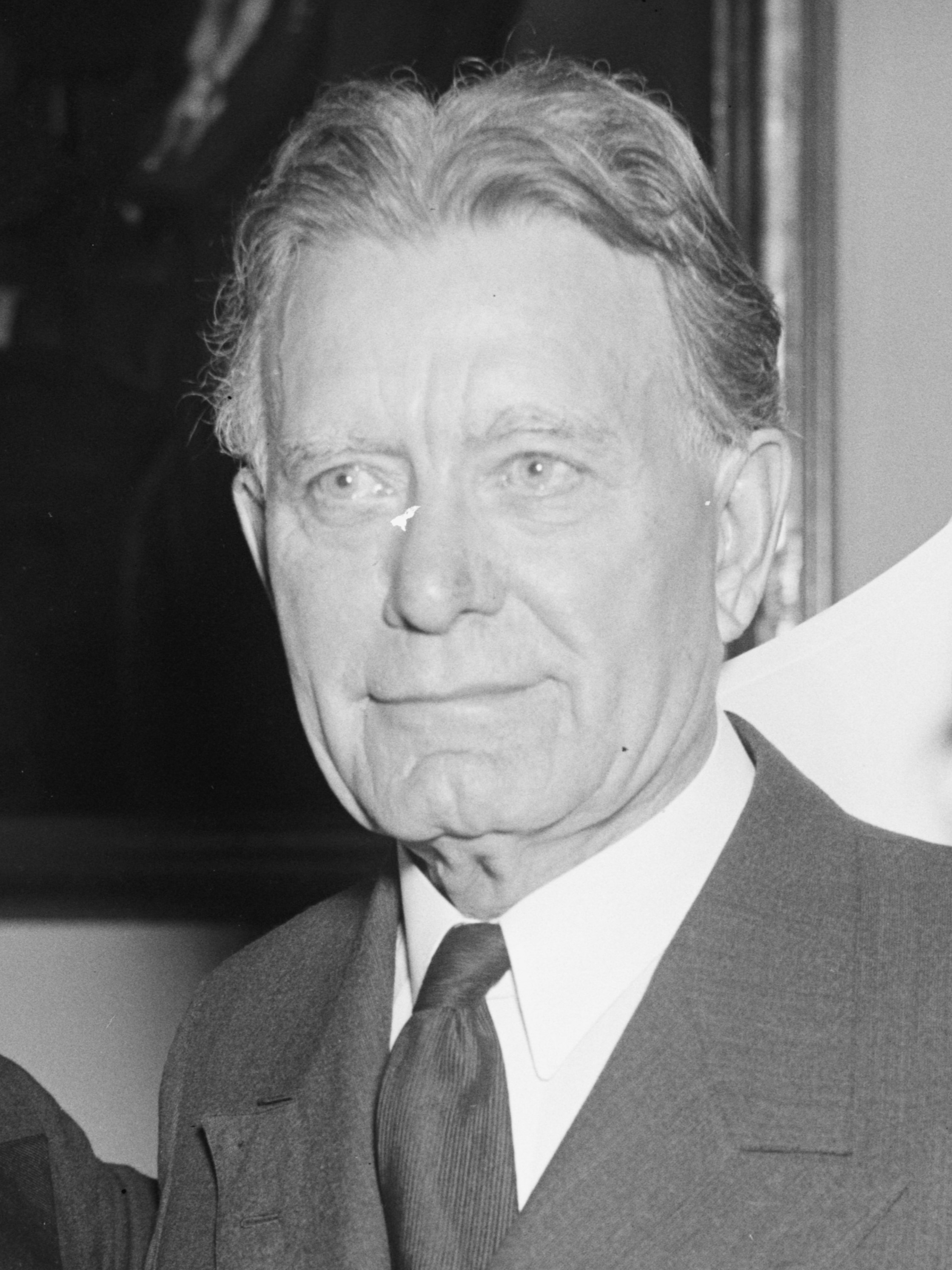
Senator
William Borah
of Idaho
(not nominated)

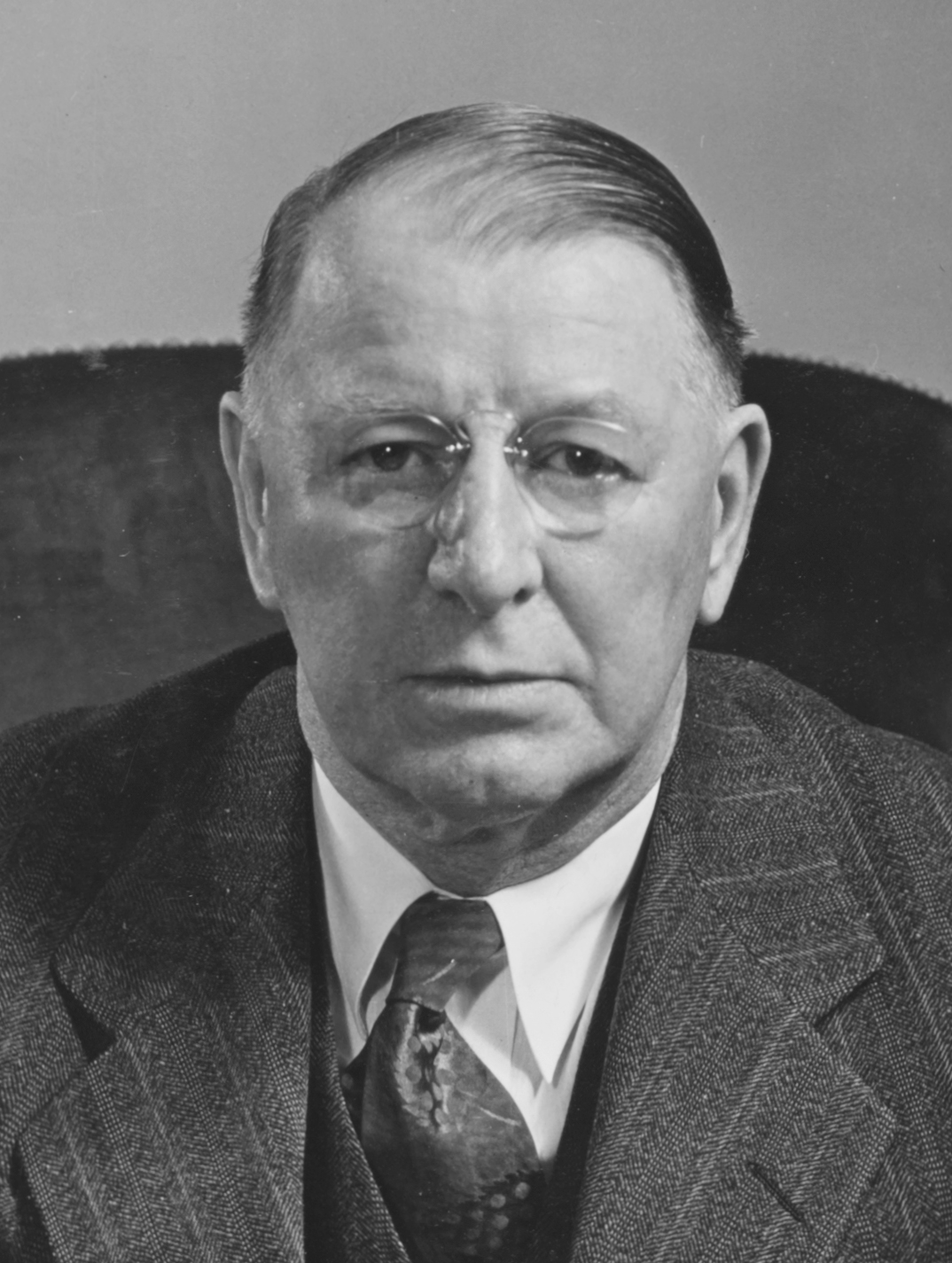
Newspaper Publisher
Frank Knox
of Illinois
(not nominated)

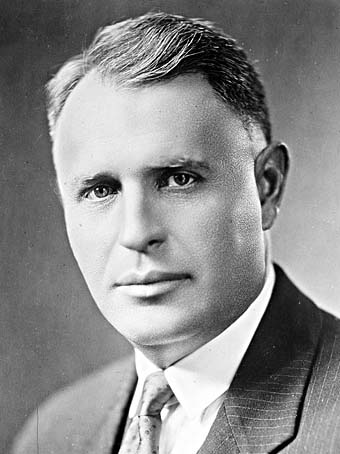
Senator
Frederick Steiwer
of Oregon
(not nominated)

Former President
Herbert Hoover
of California
(not nominated)

At the start of the convention, Landon looked like the likely nominee, but faced opposition from a coalition led by Michigan Senator Arthur Vandenberg, Idaho Senator William E. Borah, and newspaper publisher Frank Knox. However, the stop-Landon movement failed.

Presidential ballot
Candidate	1st
Landon	984
Borah	19

Presidential balloting / 3rd day of convention (June 11, 1936)

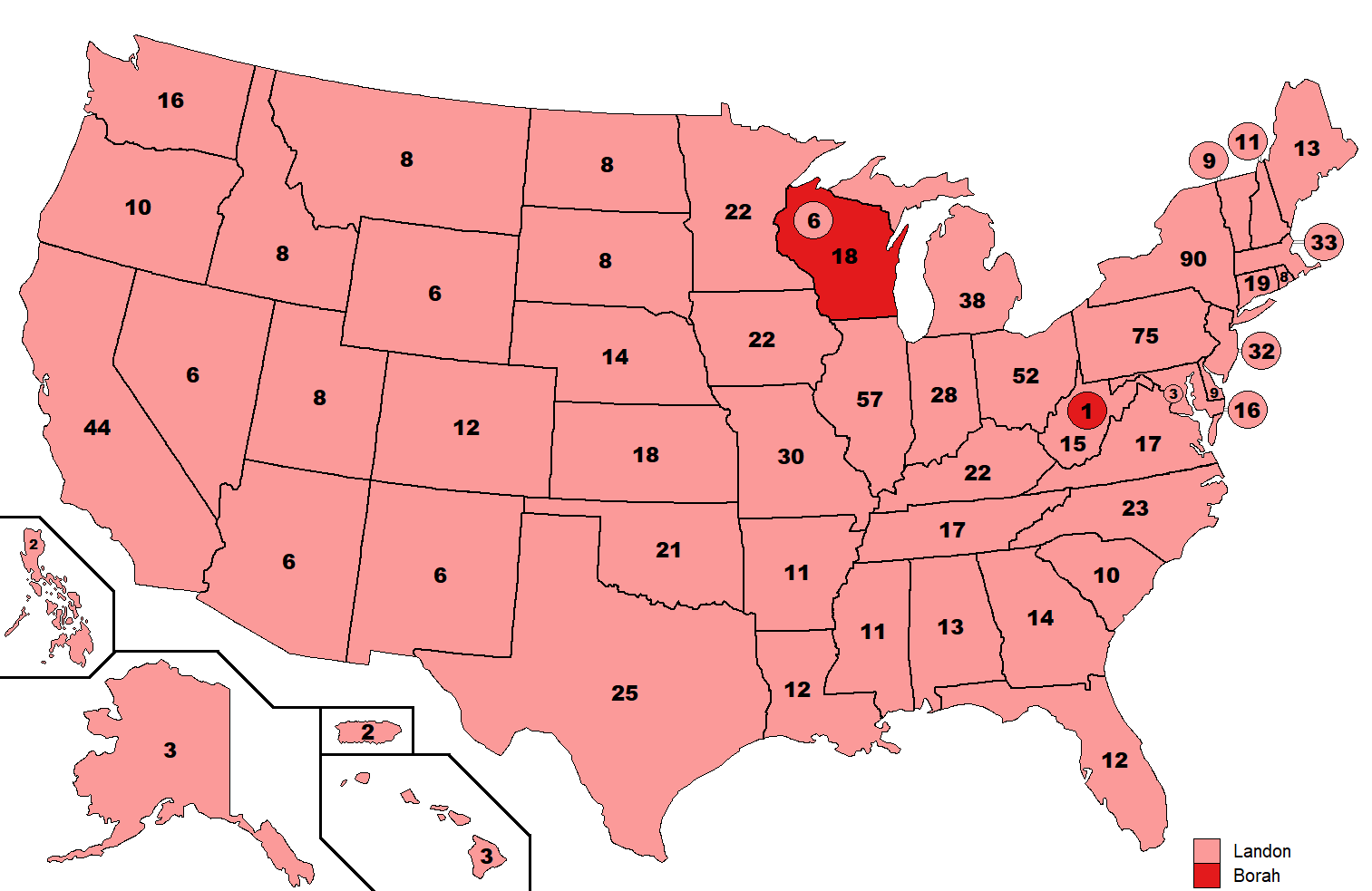
1st presidential ballot

== Vice-presidential nomination ==
=== Vice-presidential candidates ===
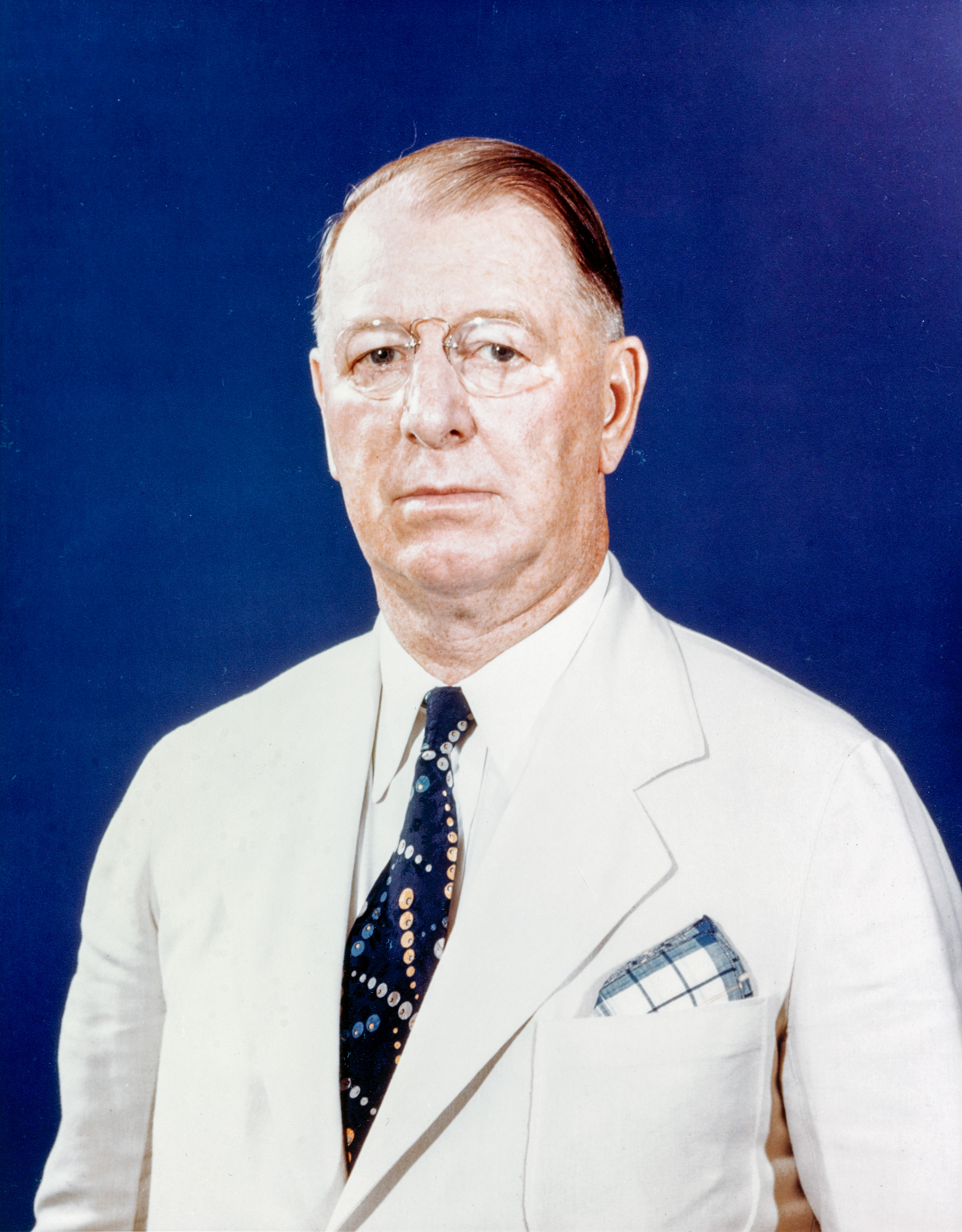
Newspaper Publisher
Frank Knox
of Illinois

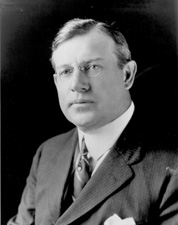
Former Ambassador
Walter Evans Edge
of New Jersey
(withdrawn)

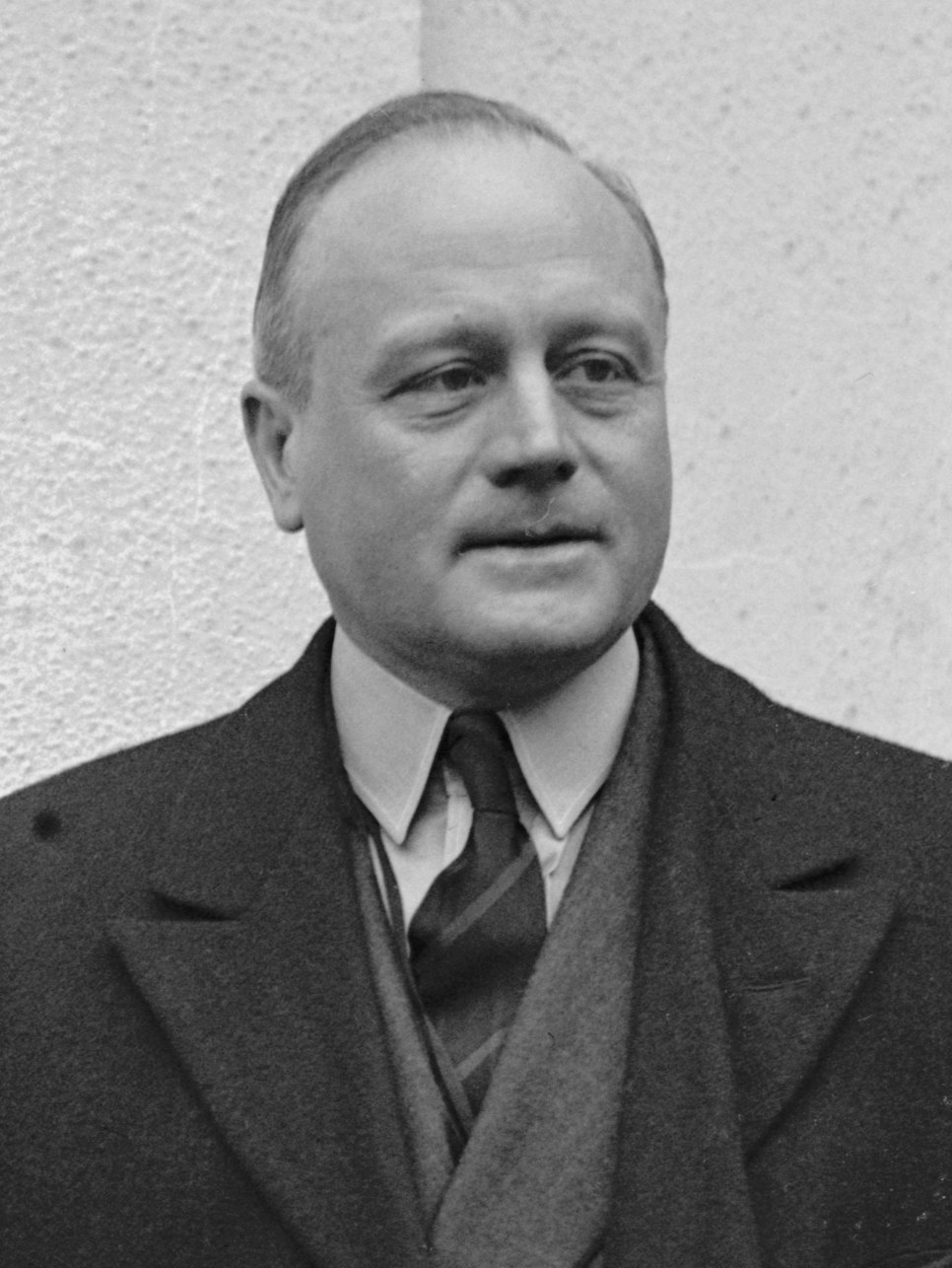
Publisher
Arthur W. Little
of New York
(withdrawn)

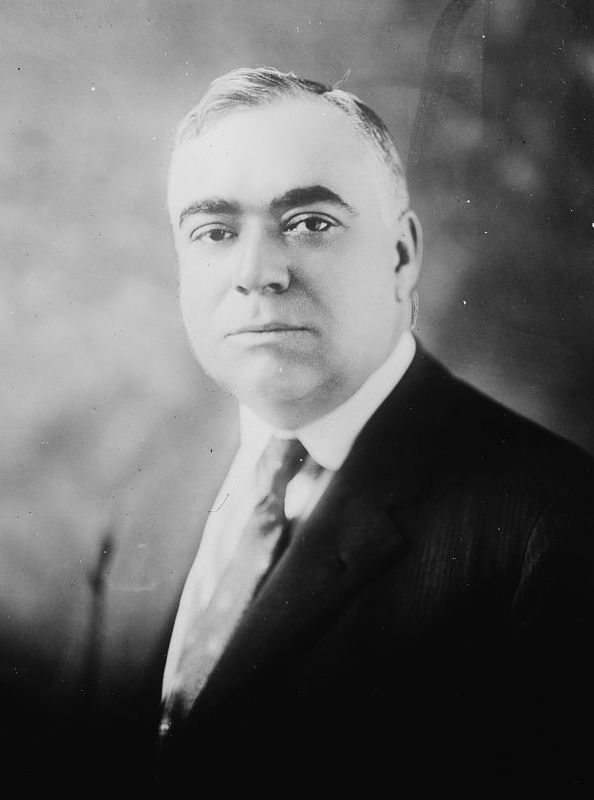
Governor
Harry Nice
of Maryland
(withdrawn)

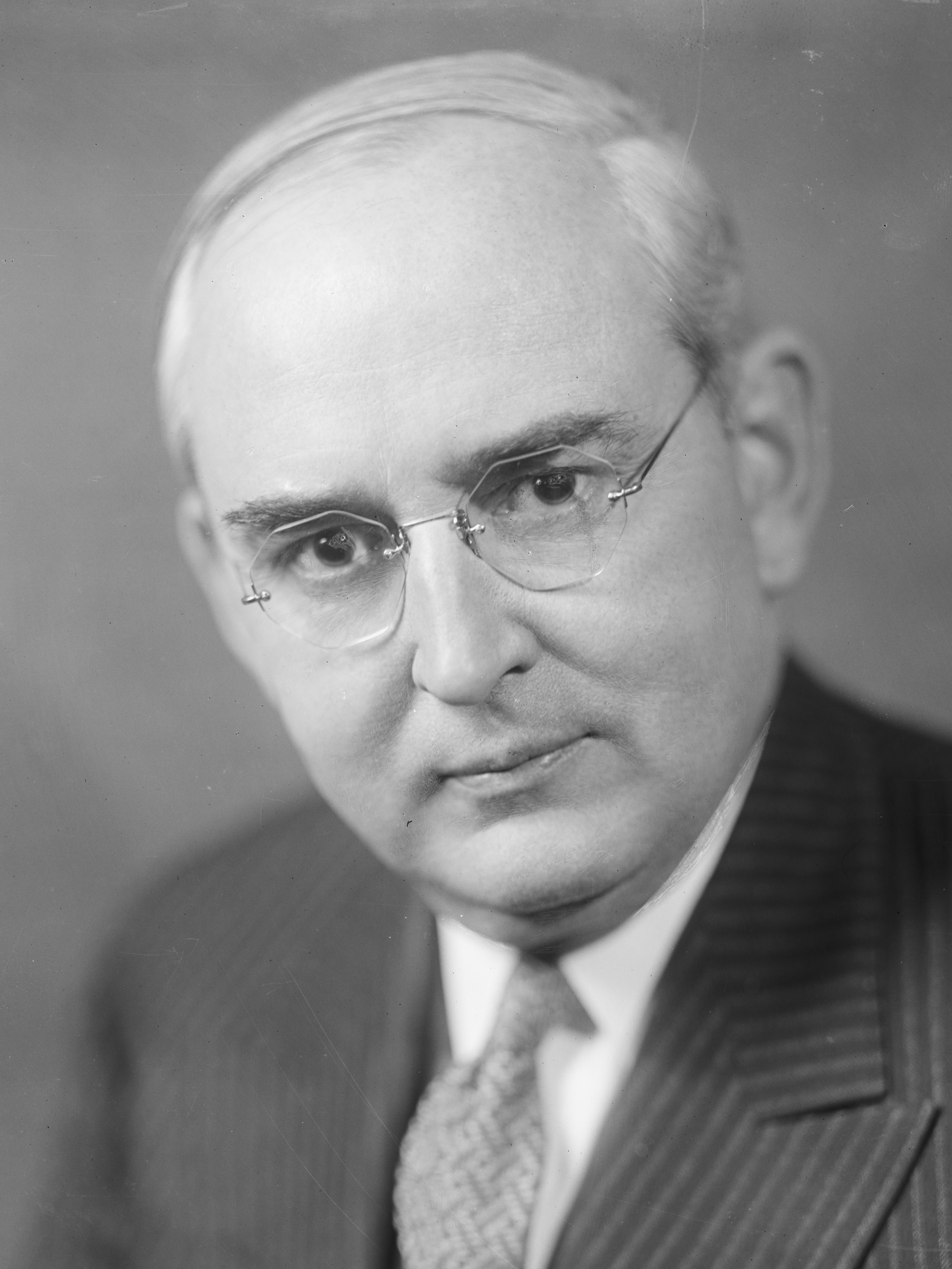
Senator
Arthur Vandenberg
of Michigan
(declined consideration)

The selection of a vice presidential candidate at the closing session presented some difficulties. The Landon people wanted Vandenberg but the Michigan senator refused repeatedly and firmly.

Colonel Knox, former Ambassador Edge, Colonel Little, and Governor Nice were placed in nomination. It soon became evident the choice of the convention would be Knox as state after state seconded his nomination. Edge, Little, and Nice withdrew their names and the Chicago publisher became the unanimous choice for second place on the ticket.

Vice-presidential ballot
Candidate	1st
Knox	1,003

Vice-presidential balloting / 4th day of convention (June 12, 1936)

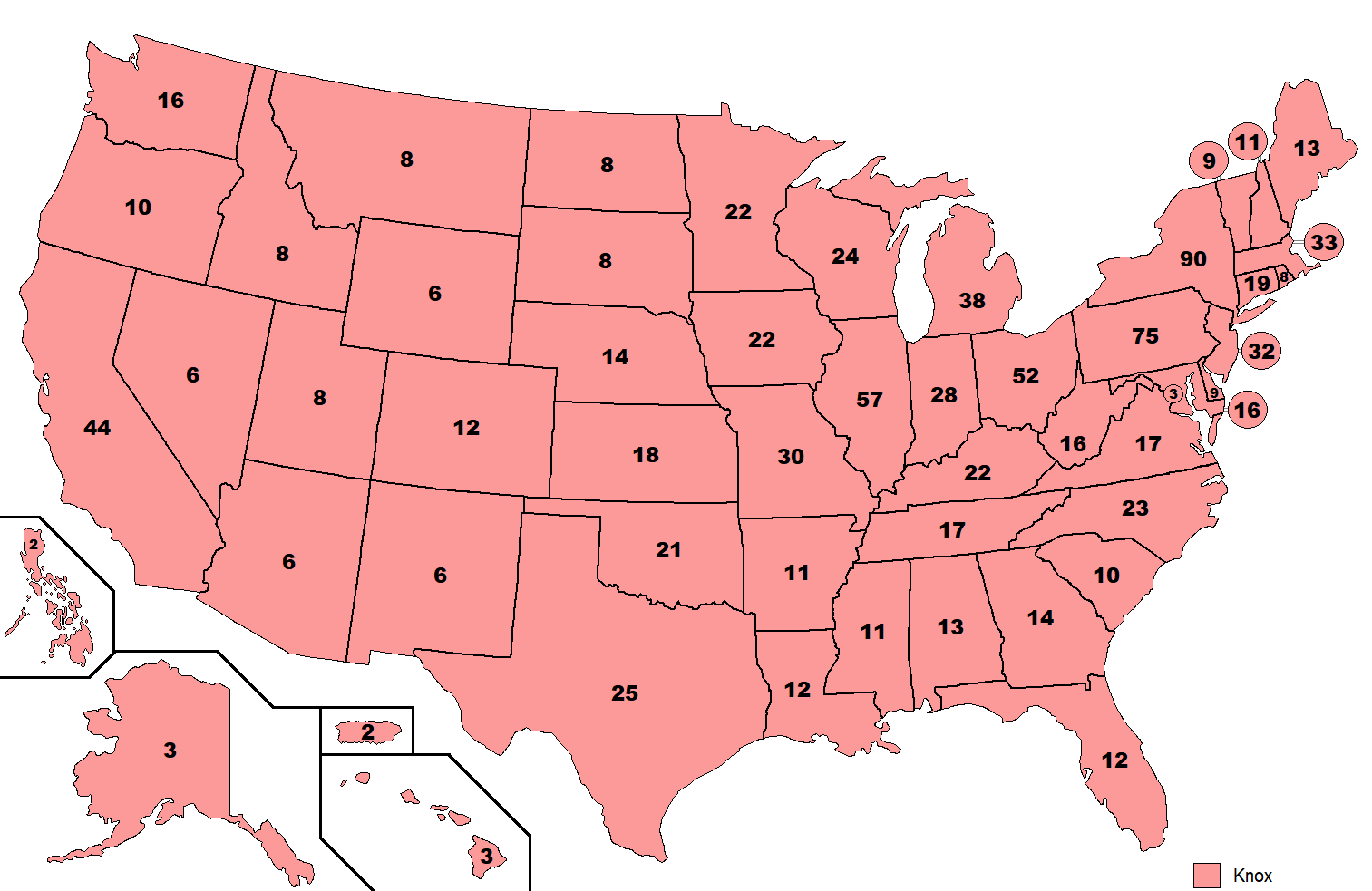
1st
Vice-presidential ballot

== See also ==
- History of the United States Republican Party
- List of Republican National Conventions
- List of presidential nominating conventions in the United States
- United States presidential nominating convention
- 1936 Republican Party presidential primaries
- 1936 United States presidential election
- 1936 Democratic National Convention

Preceded by 1932; Chicago	Republican National Conventions	Succeeded by 1940; Philadelphia
