= 70th United States Congress =

1927–1929 U.S. Congress

←	69th	71st	→
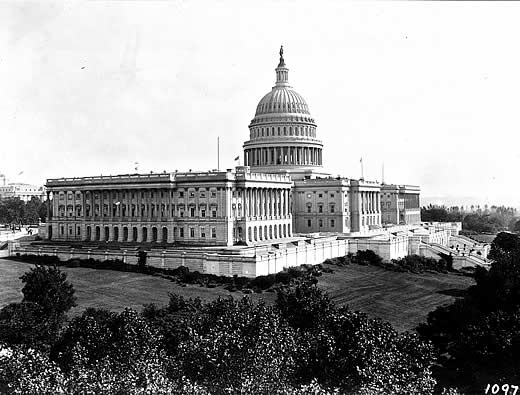
- United States Capitol (1906)

Overview
- Legislative body: United States Congress
- Jurisdiction: United States
- Term: March 4, 1927 – March 4, 1929

Senate
- Members: 96
- President: Charles G. Dawes (R)
- President pro tempore: George H. Moses (R)
- Party control: Republican (through VP tie-breaking majority starting at end of 1st month of 1st session)

House of Representatives
- Members: 435 representatives 5 non-voting delegates
- Speaker: Nicholas Longworth (R)
- Party control: Republican

Sessions
- 1st: December 5, 1927 – May 29, 1928
- 2nd: December 3, 1928 – March 3, 1929

The 70th United States Congress was a meeting of the legislative branch of the United States federal government, consisting of the United States Senate and the United States House of Representatives. It met in Washington, D.C., from March 4, 1927, to March 4, 1929, during the last two years of Calvin Coolidge's presidency. The apportionment of seats in the House of Representatives was based on the 1910 United States census.

Both chambers had a Republican majority - albeit reduced from the previous Congress - and along with President Coolidge, the Republicans maintained an overall federal government trifecta.

== Major events ==
- November 6, 1928: U.S. Senate elections and U.S. House elections

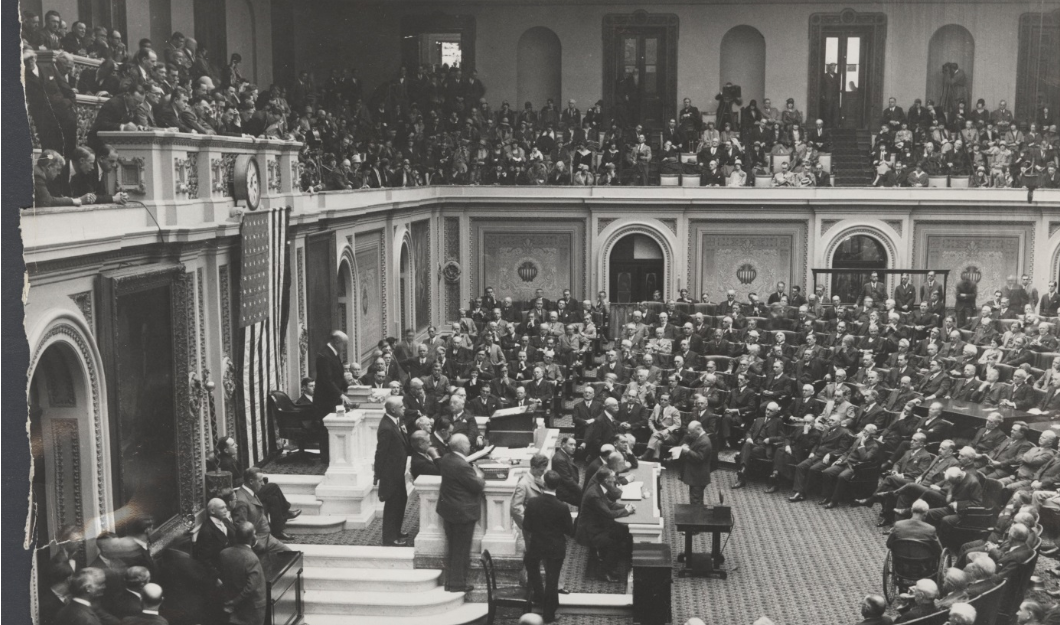
Opening of the 70th Congress

- This was the last Congress to be exclusively white and the last to not have a single black member of Congress in either chamber.

== Major legislation ==
- March 10, 1928: Settlement of War Claims Act
- May 15, 1928: Flood Control Act of 1928 (Jones–Reid Act)
- May 22, 1928: Merchant Marine Act of 1928 (Jones–White Act)
- May 22, 1928: Forest Research Act (McSweeney–McNary Act)
- May 22, 1928: Capper–Ketcham Act
- May 28, 1928: Welsh Act
- May 29, 1928: Revenue Act of 1928, ch. 852, 45 Stat. 791
- May 29, 1928: Reed–Jenkins Act
- December 21, 1928: Boulder Canyon Project Act (Hoover Dam)
- December 22, 1928: Color of Title Act
- January 19, 1929: Hawes–Cooper Act
- February 18, 1929: Migratory Bird Conservation Act (Norbeck–Anderson Act), ch. 257, 45 Stat. 1222
- February 25, 1929: Mount Rushmore National Memorial Act (Norbeck-Williamson Act of 1929)
- March 2, 1929: Increased Penalties Act (Jones–Stalker Act)

== Party summary ==
Senate composition by state 2 Democrats (19 states) 2 Republicans (18 states) 1 Democrat and 1 Republican (11 states) 1 Republican and 1 Farmer-Labor (1 state)

The count below identifies party affiliations at the beginning of the first session of this Congress, and includes members from vacancies and newly admitted states, when they were first seated. Changes resulting from subsequent replacements are shown below in the "Changes in membership" section.

=== Senate ===
At the end of the first month of the first session of Congress, Republicans gained control of the Senate through a VP-tie-breaking majority.

Affiliation	Party (Shading indicates majority caucus)			Total	
Affiliation	Democratic	Farmer- Labor	Republican	Total	Vacant
End of previous Congress	42	1	52	95	1
Begin	47	1	46	94	2
December 20, 1927	46	1	46	93	3
December 29, 1927	46	1	47	94	2
March 23, 1928	45	1	47	93	3
March 30, 1928	45	1	46	92	4
March 31, 1928	45	1	47	93	3
April 4, 1928	46	1	47	94	2
June 24, 1928	46	1	46	93	3
June 30, 1928	46	1	47	94	2
December 3, 1928	46	1	48	95	1
December 9, 1928	46	1	47	94	2
December 10, 1928	46	1	48	95	1
December 15, 1928	45	1	49	95	1
Final voting share	47.4%	1.1%	51.6%		
Beginning of the next Congress	39	1	54	94	2

=== House of Representatives ===
	Party (shading shows control)				Total	Vacant
	Democratic (D)	Farmer– Labor (FL)	Republican (R)	Socialist (S)	Total	Vacant
End of previous congress	182	3	246	2	433	2
Begin	194	2	237	1	434	1
End	193	2	232	1	428	7
Final voting share	45.1%	0.5%	54.2%	0.2%		
Beginning of next congress	164	1	268	0	433	2

== Leadership ==
Senate President

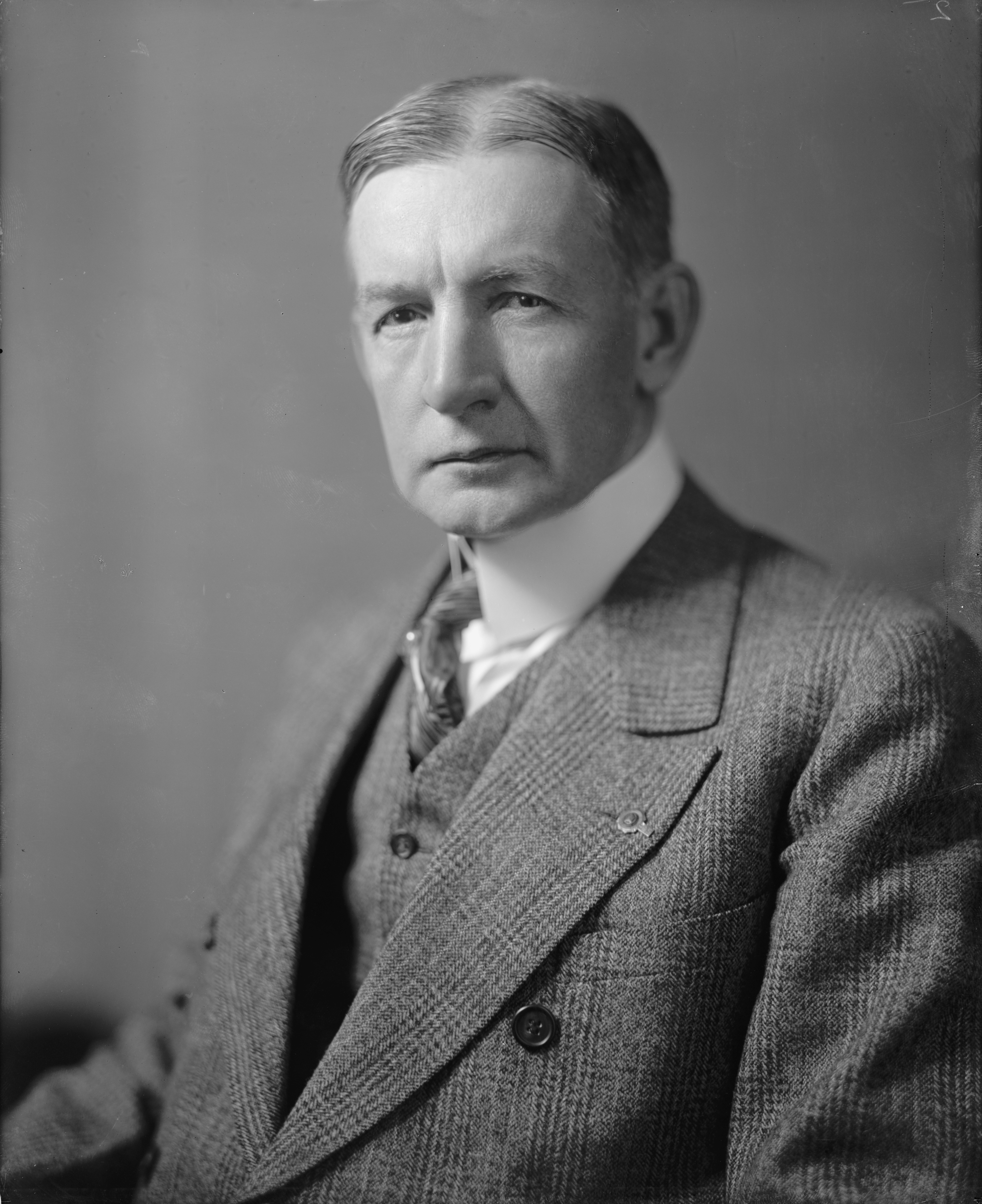
Charles G. Dawes (R)

Senate Presidents pro tempore

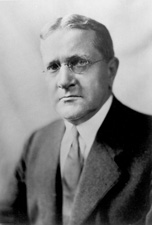
George H. Moses (R)

House Speaker

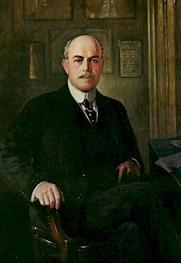
Nicholas Longworth (R)

=== Senate ===
- President: Charles G. Dawes (R)
- President pro tempore: George H. Moses (R)

==== Majority (Republican) leadership ====
- Majority Leader: Charles Curtis
- Majority Whip: Wesley L. Jones
- Republican Conference Secretary: Frederick Hale
- National Senatorial Committee Chair: Jesse H. Metcalf

==== Minority (Democratic) leadership ====
- Minority leader: Joseph T. Robinson
- Minority whip: Peter G. Gerry
- Democratic Caucus Secretary: Hugo Black

=== House of Representatives ===
- Speaker: Nicholas Longworth (R)

==== Majority (Republican) leadership ====
- Majority Leader: John Q. Tilson
- Majority Whip: Albert Vestal
- Republican Conference Chairman: Willis C. Hawley
- Republican Campaign Committee Chairman: William R. Wood

==== Minority (Democratic) leadership ====
- Minority Leader: Finis J. Garrett
- Minority Whip: William Allan Oldfield
- Democratic Caucus Chairman: Arthur H. Greenwood
- Democratic Campaign Committee Chairman: Joseph W. Byrns Sr.

== Members ==
This list is arranged by chamber, then by state.

=== Senate ===
Senators are listed by class. They were elected every two years, with one-third beginning new six-year terms with each Congress. Preceding the names in the list below are Senate class numbers, which indicate the cycle of their election. In this Congress, Class 1 meant their term ended with this Congress, requiring re-election in 1928; Class 2 meant their term began in the last Congress, requiring re-election in 1930; and Class 3 meant their term began with this Congress, requiring re-election in 1932.

==== Alabama ====
▌2. J. Thomas Heflin (D)
▌3. Hugo Black (D)

==== Arizona ====
▌1. Henry F. Ashurst (D)
▌3. Carl Hayden (D)

==== Arkansas ====
▌2. Joseph Taylor Robinson (D)
▌3. Thaddeus H. Caraway (D)

==== California ====
▌1. Hiram W. Johnson (R)
▌3. Samuel M. Shortridge (R)

==== Colorado ====
▌2. Lawrence C. Phipps (R)
▌3. Charles W. Waterman (R)

==== Connecticut ====
▌1. George P. McLean (R)
▌3. Hiram Bingham III (R)

==== Delaware ====
▌1. Thomas F. Bayard Jr. (D)
▌2. T. Coleman du Pont (R), until December 9, 1928

▌Daniel O. Hastings (R), from December 10, 1928

==== Florida ====
▌1. Park Trammell (D)
▌3. Duncan U. Fletcher (D)

==== Georgia ====
▌2. William J. Harris (D)
▌3. Walter F. George (D)

==== Idaho ====
▌2. William E. Borah (R)
▌3. Frank R. Gooding (R), until June 24, 1928

▌John Thomas (R), from June 30, 1928

==== Illinois ====
▌2. Charles S. Deneen (R)
3. Vacant until December 3, 1928 (Note: Frank L. Smith (R-IL) was elected to the Senate for the term starting March 4, 1927, but the Senate refused to qualify him due to charges of corruption concerning his election. He resigned February 9, 1928.)

▌Otis F. Glenn (R), from December 3, 1928

==== Indiana ====
▌1. Arthur R. Robinson (R)
▌3. James E. Watson (R)

==== Iowa ====
▌2. Daniel F. Steck (D)
▌3. Smith W. Brookhart (R)

==== Kansas ====
▌2. Arthur Capper (R)
▌3. Charles Curtis (R)

==== Kentucky ====
▌2. Frederic M. Sackett (R)
▌3. Alben W. Barkley (D)

==== Louisiana ====
▌2. Joseph E. Ransdell (D)
▌3. Edwin S. Broussard (D)

==== Maine ====
▌1. Frederick Hale (R)
▌2. Arthur R. Gould (R)

==== Maryland ====
▌1. William Cabell Bruce (D)
▌3. Millard Tydings (D)

==== Massachusetts ====
▌1. David I. Walsh (D)
▌2. Frederick H. Gillett (R)

==== Michigan ====
▌1. Woodbridge N. Ferris (D), until March 23, 1928

▌Arthur H. Vandenberg (R), from March 31, 1928

▌2. James J. Couzens (R)

==== Minnesota ====
▌1. Henrik Shipstead (FL)
▌2. Thomas D. Schall (R)

==== Mississippi ====
▌1. Hubert D. Stephens (D)
▌2. Pat Harrison (D)

==== Missouri ====
▌1. James A. Reed (D)
▌3. Harry B. Hawes (D)

==== Montana ====
▌1. Burton K. Wheeler (D)
▌2. Thomas J. Walsh (D)

==== Nebraska ====
▌1. Robert B. Howell (R)
▌2. George W. Norris (R)

==== Nevada ====
▌1. Key Pittman (D)
▌3. Tasker Oddie (R)

==== New Hampshire ====
▌2. Henry W. Keyes (R)
▌3. George H. Moses (R)

==== New Jersey ====
▌1. Edward I. Edwards (D)
▌2. Walter E. Edge (R)

==== New Mexico ====
▌1. Andrieus A. Jones (D), until December 20, 1927

▌Bronson M. Cutting (R), from December 29, 1927, until December 6, 1928
▌Octaviano A. Larrazolo (R), from December 7, 1928

▌2. Sam G. Bratton (D)

==== New York ====
▌1. Royal S. Copeland (D)
▌3. Robert F. Wagner (D)

==== North Carolina ====
▌2. Furnifold M. Simmons (D)
▌3. Lee S. Overman (D)

==== North Dakota ====
▌1. Lynn Frazier (R-NPL)
▌3. Gerald Nye (R)

==== Ohio ====
▌1. Simeon D. Fess (R)
▌3. Frank B. Willis (R), until March 30, 1928

▌Cyrus Locher (D), from April 4, 1928, until December 14, 1928
▌Theodore E. Burton (R), from December 15, 1928

==== Oklahoma ====
▌2. William B. Pine (R)
▌3. Elmer Thomas (D)

==== Oregon ====
▌2. Charles L. McNary (R)
▌3. Frederick Steiwer (R)

==== Pennsylvania ====
▌1. David A. Reed (R)
3. Vacant (Note: William S. Vare (R-PA) was elected to the Senate for the term starting March 4, 1927, but the Senate refused to qualify him due to charges of corruption and fraud concerning his election. In the next Congress, the Senate unseated him.)

==== Rhode Island ====
▌1. Peter G. Gerry (D)
▌2. Jesse H. Metcalf (R)

==== South Carolina ====
▌2. Coleman L. Blease (D)
▌3. Ellison D. Smith (D)

==== South Dakota ====
▌2. William H. McMaster (R)
▌3. Peter Norbeck (R)

==== Tennessee ====
▌1. Kenneth D. McKellar(D)
▌2. Lawrence Tyson (D)

==== Texas ====
▌1. Earle B. Mayfield (D)
▌2. Morris Sheppard (D)

==== Utah ====
▌1. William H. King (D)
▌3. Reed Smoot (R)

==== Vermont ====
▌1. Frank L. Greene (R)
▌3. Porter H. Dale (R)

==== Virginia ====
▌1. Claude A. Swanson (D)
▌2. Carter Glass (D)

==== Washington ====
▌1. Clarence Cleveland Dill (D)
▌3. Wesley L. Jones (R)

==== West Virginia ====
▌1. Matthew M. Neely (D)
▌2. Guy D. Goff (R)

==== Wisconsin ====
▌1. Robert M. La Follette Jr. (R)
▌3. John J. Blaine (R)

==== Wyoming ====
▌1. John B. Kendrick (D)
▌2. Francis E. Warren (R)

Senate majority leaders

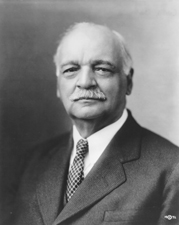
Republican Leader
Charles Curtis

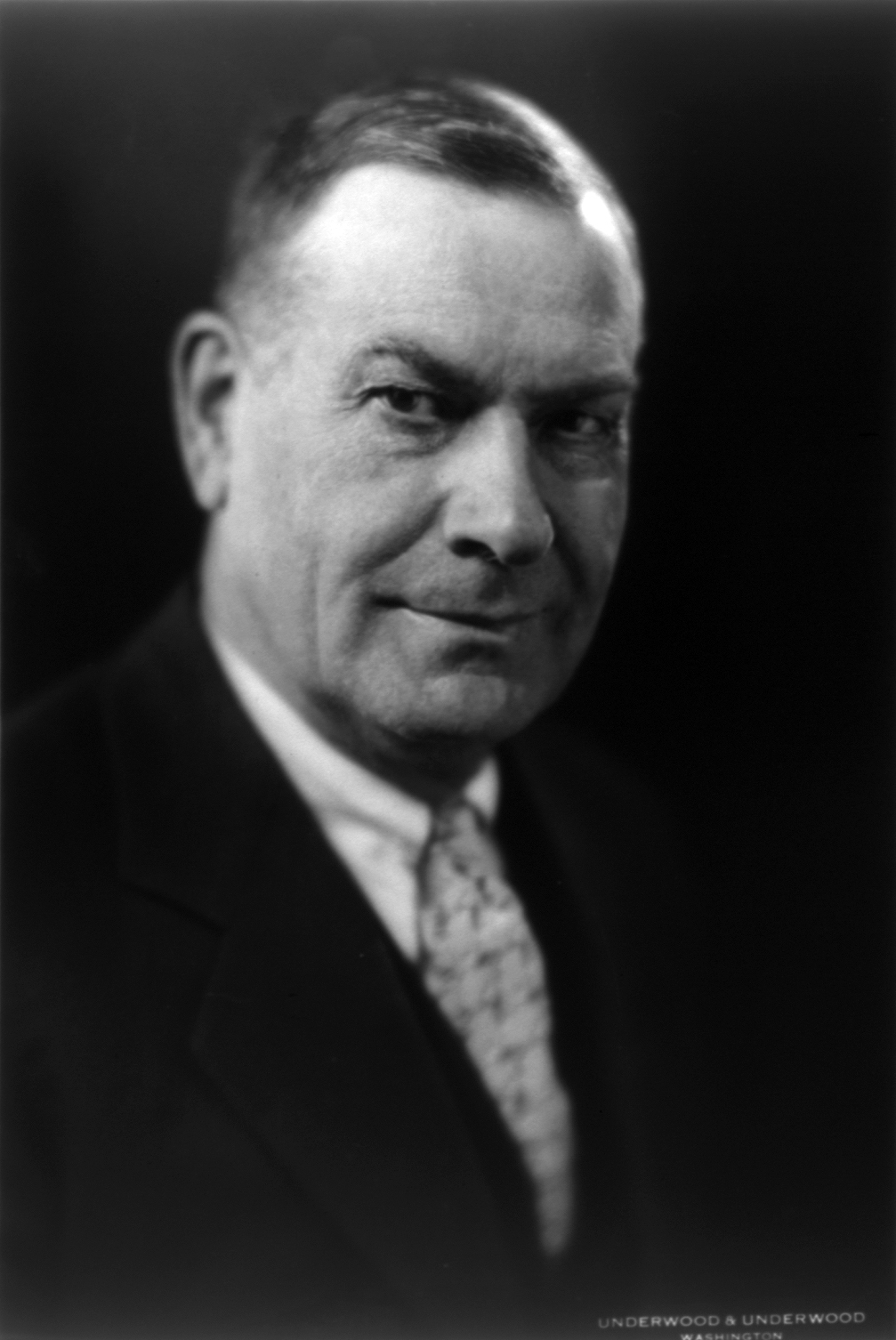
Republican Whip
Wesley Jones

Senate minority leaders

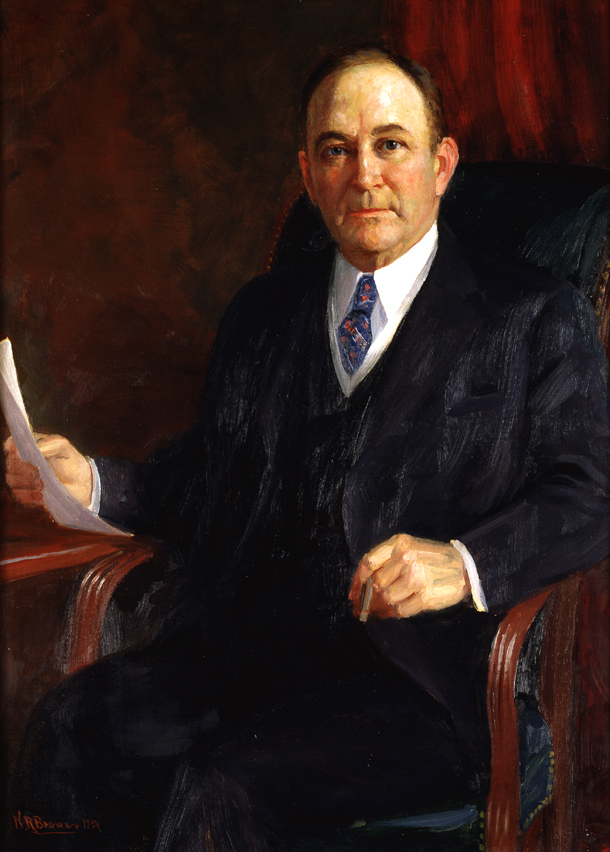
Democratic Leader
Joseph T. Robinson

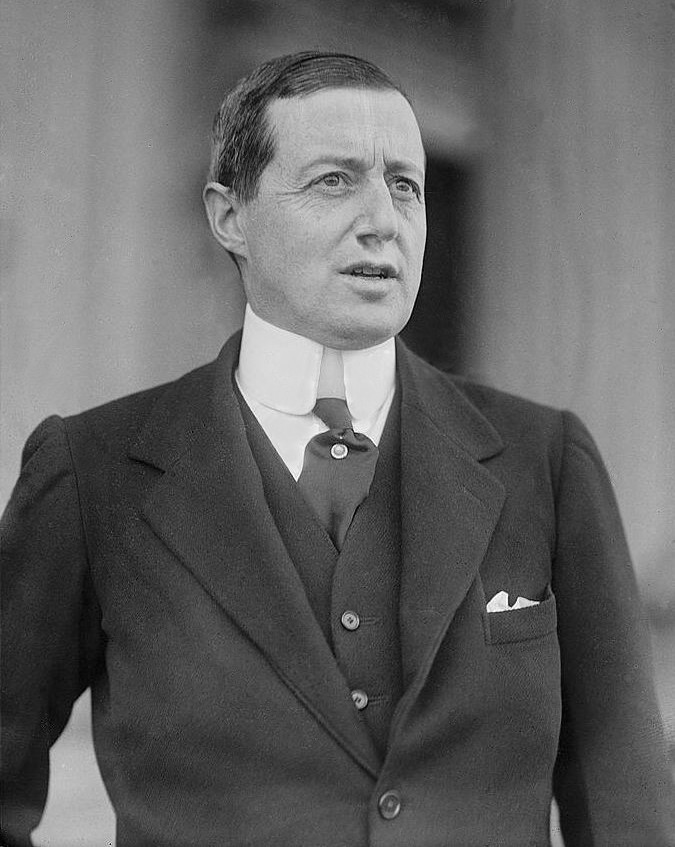
Democratic Whip
Peter G. Gerry

=== House of Representatives ===
Representatives are listed by district.

==== Alabama ====
▌1. John McDuffie (D)
▌2. J. Lister Hill (D)
▌3. Henry B. Steagall (D)
▌4. Lamar Jeffers (D)
▌5. William B. Bowling (D), until August 16, 1928

▌LaFayette L. Patterson (D), from November 6, 1928

▌6. William B. Oliver (D)
▌7. Miles C. Allgood (D)
▌8. Edward B. Almon (D)
▌9. George Huddleston (D)
▌10. William B. Bankhead (D)

==== Arizona ====
▌At-large. Lewis W. Douglas (D)

==== Arkansas ====
▌1. William J. Driver (D)
▌2. William A. Oldfield (D), until November 19, 1928

▌Pearl Peden Oldfield (D), from January 9, 1929

▌3. John N. Tillman (D)
▌4. Otis Wingo (D)
▌5. Heartsill Ragon (D)
▌6. James B. Reed (D)
▌7. Tilman B. Parks (D)

==== California ====
▌1. Clarence F. Lea (D)
▌2. Harry L. Englebright (R)
▌3. Charles F. Curry (R)
▌4. Florence P. Kahn (R)
▌5. Richard J. Welch (R)
▌6. Albert E. Carter (R)
▌7. Henry E. Barbour (R)
▌8. Arthur M. Free (R)
▌9. William E. Evans (R)
▌10. Joe Crail (R)
▌11. Philip D. Swing (R)

==== Colorado ====
▌1. William N. Vaile (R), until July 2, 1927

▌S. Harrison White (D), from November 15, 1927

▌2. Charles Bateman Timberlake (R)
▌3. Guy U. Hardy (R)
▌4. Edward T. Taylor (D)

==== Connecticut ====
▌1. E. Hart Fenn (R)
▌2. Richard P. Freeman (R)
▌3. John Q. Tilson (R)
▌4. Schuyler Merritt (R)
▌5. James P. Glynn (R)

==== Delaware ====
▌At-large. Robert G. Houston (R)

==== Florida ====
▌1. Herbert J. Drane (D)
▌2. Robert A. Green (D)
▌3. Tom A. Yon (D)
▌4. William J. Sears (D)

==== Georgia ====
▌1. Charles G. Edwards (D)
▌2. Edward E. Cox (D)
▌3. Charles R. Crisp (D)
▌4. William C. Wright (D)
▌5. Leslie J. Steele (D)
▌6. Samuel Rutherford (D)
▌7. Malcolm C. Tarver (D)
▌8. Charles H. Brand (D)
▌9. Thomas Montgomery Bell (D)
▌10. Carl Vinson (D)
▌11. William C. Lankford (D)
▌12. William W. Larsen (D)

==== Idaho ====
▌1. Burton L. French (R)
▌2. Addison T. Smith (R)

==== Illinois ====
▌1. Martin B. Madden (R), until April 27, 1928
▌2. Morton D. Hull (R)
▌3. Elliott W. Sproul (R)
▌4. Thomas A. Doyle (D)
▌5. Adolph J. Sabath (D)
▌6. James T. Igoe (D)
▌7. M. Alfred Michaelson (R)
▌8. Stanley H. Kunz (D)
▌9. Frederick A. Britten (R)
▌10. Carl R. Chindblom (R)
▌11. Frank R. Reid (R)
▌12. John T. Buckbee (R)
▌13. William R. Johnson (R)
▌14. John C. Allen (R)
▌15. Edward J. King (R), until February 17, 1929
▌16. William E. Hull (R)
▌17. Homer W. Hall (R)
▌18. William P. Holaday (R)
▌19. Charles Adkins (R)
▌20. Henry T. Rainey (D)
▌21. J. Earl Major (D)
▌22. Edward M. Irwin (R)
▌23. William W. Arnold (D)
▌24. Thomas S. Williams (R)
▌25. Edward E. Denison (R)
▌At-large. Henry R. Rathbone (R), until July 15, 1928
▌At-large. Richard Yates Jr. (R)

==== Indiana ====
▌1. Harry E. Rowbottom (R)
▌2. Arthur H. Greenwood (D)
▌3. Frank Gardner (D)
▌4. Harry C. Canfield (D)
▌5. Noble J. Johnson (R)
▌6. Richard N. Elliott (R)
▌7. Ralph E. Updike (R)
▌8. Albert H. Vestal (R)
▌9. Fred S. Purnell (R)
▌10. William R. Wood (R)
▌11. Albert R. Hall (R)
▌12. David Hogg (R)
▌13. Andrew J. Hickey (R)

==== Iowa ====
▌1. William F. Kopp (R)
▌2. F. Dickinson Letts (R)
▌3. Thomas J. B. Robinson (R)
▌4. Gilbert N. Haugen (R)
▌5. Cyrenus Cole (R)
▌6. C. William Ramseyer (R)
▌7. Cassius C. Dowell (R)
▌8. Lloyd Thurston (R)
▌9. William R. Green (R), until March 31, 1928

▌Earl W. Vincent (R), from June 4, 1928

▌10. Lester J. Dickinson (R)
▌11. William D. Boies (R)

==== Kansas ====
▌1. Daniel Read Anthony Jr. (R)
▌2. Ulysses S. Guyer (R)
▌3. William H. Sproul (R)
▌4. Homer Hoch (R)
▌5. James G. Strong (R)
▌6. Hays B. White (R)
▌7. Clifford R. Hope (R)
▌8. William A. Ayres (D)

==== Kentucky ====
▌1. William V. Gregory (D)
▌2. David Hayes Kincheloe (D)
▌3. John W. Moore (D)
▌4. Henry D. Moorman (D)
▌5. Maurice H. Thatcher (R)
▌6. Orie S. Ware (D)
▌7. Virgil Chapman (D)
▌8. Ralph W. E. Gilbert (D)
▌9. Fred M. Vinson (D)
▌10. Katherine G. Langley (R)
▌11. John M. Robsion (R)

==== Louisiana ====
▌1. James O'Connor (D)
▌2. J. Zach Spearing (D)
▌3. Whitmell P. Martin (D)
▌4. John N. Sandlin (D)
▌5. Riley Joseph Wilson (D)
▌6. Bolivar E. Kemp (D)
▌7. Ladislas Lazaro (D), until March 30, 1927

▌René L. De Rouen (D), from August 23, 1927

▌8. James Benjamin Aswell (D)

==== Maine ====
▌1. Carroll L. Beedy (R)
▌2. Wallace H. White Jr. (R)
▌3. John E. Nelson (R)
▌4. Ira G. Hersey (R)

==== Maryland ====
▌1. T. Alan Goldsborough (D)
▌2. William P. Cole Jr. (D)
▌3. Vincent L. Palmisano (D)
▌4. J. Charles Linthicum (D)
▌5. Stephen W. Gambrill (D)
▌6. Frederick N. Zihlman (R)

==== Massachusetts ====
▌1. Allen T. Treadway (R)
▌2. Henry L. Bowles (R)
▌3. Frank H. Foss (R)
▌4. George R. Stobbs (R)
▌5. Edith Nourse Rogers (R)
▌6. A. Piatt Andrew Jr. (R)
▌7. William P. Connery Jr. (D)
▌8. Frederick W. Dallinger (R)
▌9. Charles L. Underhill (R)
▌10. John J. Douglass (D)
▌11. George H. Tinkham (R)
▌12. James A. Gallivan (D), until April 3, 1928

▌John W. McCormack (D), from November 6, 1928

▌13. Robert Luce (R)
▌14. Louis A. Frothingham (R), until August 23, 1928

▌Richard B. Wigglesworth (R), from November 6, 1928

▌15. Joseph W. Martin Jr. (R)
▌16. Charles L. Gifford (R)

==== Michigan ====
▌1. Robert H. Clancy (R)
▌2. Earl C. Michener (R)
▌3. Joseph L. Hooper (R)
▌4. John C. Ketcham (R)
▌5. Carl Mapes (R)
▌6. Grant M. Hudson (R)
▌7. Louis C. Cramton (R)
▌8. Bird J. Vincent (R)
▌9. James C. McLaughlin (R)
▌10. Roy O. Woodruff (R)
▌11. Frank P. Bohn (R)
▌12. W. Frank James (R)
▌13. Clarence J. McLeod (R)

==== Minnesota ====
▌1. Allen J. Furlow (R)
▌2. Frank Clague (R)
▌3. August H. Andresen (R)
▌4. Melvin Maas (R)
▌5. Walter H. Newton (R)
▌6. Harold Knutson (R)
▌7. Ole J. Kvale (FL)
▌8. William L. Carss (FL)
▌9. Conrad Selvig (R)
▌10. Godfrey G. Goodwin (R)

==== Mississippi ====
▌1. John E. Rankin (D)
▌2. Bill G. Lowrey (D)
▌3. William M. Whittington (D)
▌4. T. Jefferson Busby (D)
▌5. Ross A. Collins (D)
▌6. T. Webber Wilson (D)
▌7. Percy E. Quin (D)
▌8. James W. Collier (D)

==== Missouri ====
▌1. Milton A. Romjue (D)
▌2. Ralph F. Lozier (D)
▌3. Jacob L. Milligan (D)
▌4. Charles L. Faust (R), until December 17, 1928

▌David W. Hopkins (R), from February 5, 1929

▌5. George H. Combs Jr. (D)
▌6. Clement C. Dickinson (D)
▌7. Samuel C. Major (D)
▌8. William L. Nelson (D)
▌9. Clarence Cannon (D)
▌10. Henry F. Niedringhaus (R)
▌11. John J. Cochran (D)
▌12. Leonidas C. Dyer (R)
▌13. Clyde Williams (D)
▌14. James F. Fulbright (D)
▌15. Joe J. Manlove (R)
▌16. Thomas L. Rubey (D), until November 2, 1928

==== Montana ====
▌1. John M. Evans (D)
▌2. Scott Leavitt (R)

==== Nebraska ====
▌1. John H. Morehead (D)
▌2. Willis G. Sears (R)
▌3. Edgar Howard (D)
▌4. John N. Norton (D)
▌5. Ashton C. Shallenberger (D)
▌6. Robert G. Simmons (R)

==== Nevada ====
▌At-large. Samuel S. Arentz (R)

==== New Hampshire ====
▌1. Fletcher Hale (R)
▌2. Edward H. Wason (R)

==== New Jersey ====
▌1. Charles A. Wolverton (R)
▌2. Isaac Bacharach (R)
▌3. Harold G. Hoffman (R)
▌4. Charles A. Eaton (R)
▌5. Ernest R. Ackerman (R)
▌6. Randolph Perkins (R)
▌7. George N. Seger (R)
▌8. Paul J. Moore (D)
▌9. Franklin W. Fort (R)
▌10. Frederick R. Lehlbach (R)
▌11. Oscar L. Auf der Heide (D)
▌12. Mary T. Norton (D)

==== New Mexico ====
▌At-large. John Morrow (D)

==== New York ====
▌1. Robert L. Bacon (R)
▌2. John J. Kindred (D)
▌3. George W. Lindsay (D)
▌4. Thomas H. Cullen (D)
▌5. Loring M. Black Jr. (D)
▌6. Andrew L. Somers (D)
▌7. John Quayle (D)
▌8. Patrick J. Carley (D)
▌9. David J. O'Connell (D)
▌10. Emanuel Celler (D)
▌11. Anning S. Prall (D)
▌12. Samuel Dickstein (D)
▌13. Christopher D. Sullivan (D)
▌14. William I. Sirovich (D)
▌15. John J. Boylan (D)
▌16. John J. O'Connor (D)
▌17. William W. Cohen (D)
▌18. John F. Carew (D)
▌19. Sol Bloom (D)
▌20. Fiorello H. LaGuardia (R)
▌21. Royal H. Weller (D), until March 1, 1929
▌22. Anthony J. Griffin (D)
▌23. Frank Oliver (D)
▌24. James M. Fitzpatrick (D)
▌25. J. Mayhew Wainwright (R)
▌26. Hamilton Fish III (R)
▌27. Harcourt J. Pratt (R)
▌28. Parker Corning (D)
▌29. James S. Parker (R)
▌30. Frank Crowther (R)
▌31. Bertrand H. Snell (R)
▌32. Thaddeus C. Sweet (R), until May 1, 1928

▌Francis D. Culkin (R), from November 6, 1928

▌33. Frederick M. Davenport (R)
▌34. John D. Clarke (R)
▌35. Walter W. Magee (R), until May 25, 1927

▌Clarence E. Hancock (R), from November 8, 1927

▌36. John Taber (R)
▌37. Gale H. Stalker (R)
▌38. Meyer Jacobstein (D)
▌39. Archie D. Sanders (R)
▌40. S. Wallace Dempsey (R)
▌41. Clarence MacGregor (R), until December 31, 1928
▌42. James M. Mead (D)
▌43. Daniel A. Reed (R)

==== North Carolina ====
▌1. Lindsay C. Warren (D)
▌2. John H. Kerr (D)
▌3. Charles L. Abernethy (D)
▌4. Edward W. Pou (D)
▌5. Charles M. Stedman (D)
▌6. Homer L. Lyon (D)
▌7. William C. Hammer (D)
▌8. Robert L. Doughton (D)
▌9. Alfred L. Bulwinkle (D)
▌10. Zebulon Weaver (D)

==== North Dakota ====
▌1. Olger B. Burtness (R)
▌2. Thomas Hall (R)
▌3. James H. Sinclair (R)

==== Ohio ====
▌1. Nicholas Longworth (R)
2. Vacant, until November 7, 1927

▌Charles J. Tatgenhorst Jr. (R), from November 8, 1927

▌3. Roy G. Fitzgerald (R)
▌4. William T. Fitzgerald (R)
▌5. Charles J. Thompson (R)
▌6. Charles C. Kearns (R)
▌7. Charles Brand (R)
▌8. Thomas B. Fletcher (D)
▌9. William W. Chalmers (R)
▌10. Thomas A. Jenkins (R)
▌11. Mell G. Underwood (D)
▌12. John C. Speaks (R)
▌13. James T. Begg (R)
▌14. Martin L. Davey (D)
▌15. C. Ellis Moore (R)
▌16. John McSweeney (D)
▌17. William M. Morgan (R)
▌18. B. Frank Murphy (R)
▌19. John G. Cooper (R)
▌20. Charles A. Mooney (D)
▌21. Robert Crosser (D)
▌22. Theodore E. Burton (R), until December 15, 1928

==== Oklahoma ====
▌1. Everette B. Howard (D)
▌2. William W. Hastings (D)
▌3. Wilburn Cartwright (D)
▌4. Tom D. McKeown (D)
▌5. Fletcher B. Swank (D)
▌6. Jed J. Johnson (D)
▌7. James V. McClintic (D)
▌8. Milton C. Garber (R)

==== Oregon ====
▌1. Willis C. Hawley (R)
▌2. Nicholas J. Sinnott (R), until May 31, 1928

▌Robert R. Butler (R), from November 6, 1928

▌3. Maurice E. Crumpacker (R), until July 24, 1927

▌Franklin F. Korell (R), from October 18, 1927

==== Pennsylvania ====
▌1. James M. Hazlett (R), until October 20, 1927

▌James M. Beck (R), from November 8, 1927

▌2. George S. Graham (R)
▌3. Harry C. Ransley (R)
▌4. Benjamin M. Golder (R)
▌5. James J. Connolly (R)
▌6. George A. Welsh (R)
▌7. George P. Darrow (R)
▌8. Thomas S. Butler (R), until May 26, 1928

▌James Wolfenden (R), from November 6, 1928

▌9. Henry W. Watson (R)
▌10. William W. Griest (R)
▌11. Laurence H. Watres (R)
▌12. John J. Casey (D)
▌13. Cyrus M. Palmer (R)
▌14. Robert G. Bushong (R)
▌15. Louis T. McFadden (R)
▌16. Edgar R. Kiess (R)
▌17. Frederick W. Magrady (R)
▌18. Edward M. Beers (R)
▌19. Isaac H. Doutrich (R)
▌20. James R. Leech (R)
▌21. J. Banks Kurtz (R)
▌22. Franklin Menges (R)
▌23. J. Mitchell Chase (R)
▌24. Samuel A. Kendall (R)
▌25. Henry W. Temple (R)
▌26. J. Howard Swick (R)
▌27. Nathan L. Strong (R)
▌28. Thomas C. Cochran (R)
▌29. Milton W. Shreve (R)
▌30. Everett Kent (D)
▌31. Adam M. Wyant (R)
▌32. Stephen G. Porter (R)
▌33. M. Clyde Kelly (R)
▌34. John M. Morin (R)
▌35. Harry A. Estep (R)
▌36. Guy E. Campbell (R)

==== Rhode Island ====
▌1. Clark Burdick (R)
▌2. Richard S. Aldrich (R)
▌3. Louis Monast (R)

==== South Carolina ====
▌1. Thomas S. McMillan (D)
▌2. Butler B. Hare (D)
▌3. Fred H. Dominick (D)
▌4. John J. McSwain (D)
▌5. William F. Stevenson (D)
▌6. Allard H. Gasque (D)
▌7. Hampton P. Fulmer (D)

==== South Dakota ====
▌1. Charles A. Christopherson (R)
▌2. Royal C. Johnson (R)
▌3. William Williamson (R)

==== Tennessee ====
▌1. B. Carroll Reece (R)
▌2. J. Will Taylor (R)
▌3. Samuel D. McReynolds (D)
▌4. Cordell Hull (D)
▌5. Ewin L. Davis (D)
▌6. Joseph W. Byrns (D)
▌7. Edward E. Eslick (D)
▌8. Gordon Browning (D)
▌9. Finis J. Garrett (D)
▌10. Hubert Fisher (D)

==== Texas ====
▌1. Eugene Black (D)
▌2. John C. Box (D)
▌3. Morgan G. Sanders (D)
▌4. Sam Rayburn (D)
▌5. Hatton W. Sumners (D)
▌6. Luther Alexander Johnson (D)
▌7. Clay Stone Briggs (D)
▌8. Daniel E. Garrett (D)
▌9. Joseph J. Mansfield (D)
▌10. James P. Buchanan (D)
▌11. Tom T. Connally (D)
▌12. Fritz G. Lanham (D)
▌13. Guinn Williams (D)
▌14. Harry M. Wurzbach (R)
▌15. John Nance Garner (D)
▌16. Claude B. Hudspeth (D)
▌17. Thomas L. Blanton (D)
▌18. John Marvin Jones (D)

==== Utah ====
▌1. Don B. Colton (R)
▌2. Elmer O. Leatherwood (R)

==== Vermont ====
▌1. Elbert S. Brigham (R)
▌2. Ernest Willard Gibson (R)

==== Virginia ====
▌1. S. Otis Bland (D)
▌2. Joseph T. Deal (D)
▌3. Andrew Jackson Montague (D)
▌4. Patrick H. Drewry (D)
▌5. Joseph Whitehead (D)
▌6. Clifton A. Woodrum (D)
▌7. Thomas W. Harrison (D)
▌8. R. Walton Moore (D)
▌9. George C. Peery (D)
▌10. Henry St. George Tucker III (D)

==== Washington ====
▌1. John F. Miller (R)
▌2. Lindley H. Hadley (R)
▌3. Albert Johnson (R)
▌4. John W. Summers (R)
▌5. Samuel B. Hill (D)

==== West Virginia ====
▌1. Carl G. Bachmann (R)
▌2. Frank L. Bowman (R)
▌3. William S. O'Brien (D)
▌4. James Anthony Hughes (R)
▌5. James F. Strother (R)
▌6. Edward T. England (R)

==== Wisconsin ====
▌1. Henry Allen Cooper (R)
▌2. Charles A. Kading (R)
▌3. John M. Nelson (R)
▌4. John C. Schafer (R)
▌5. Victor L. Berger (S)
▌6. Florian Lampert (R)
▌7. Joseph D. Beck (R)
▌8. Edward E. Browne (R)
▌9. George J. Schneider (R)
▌10. James A. Frear (R)
▌11. Hubert H. Peavey (R)

==== Wyoming ====
▌At-large. Charles E. Winter (R)

==== Non-voting members ====
▌Alaska Territory. Daniel Sutherland (R)
▌Hawaii Territory. Victor S. K. Houston (R)
▌Philippines. Isauro Gabaldón (Nac.), until July 16, 1928
▌Philippines. Pedro Guevara (Nac.)
▌Puerto Rico. Félix Córdova Dávila (UPR)

House seats by party holding plurality in state: Democratic; 100% 80–99% 70–79% 60–69% 51–59% 50% / Republican; 100% 80–99% 70–79% 60–69% 51–59% 50%

House majority leaders

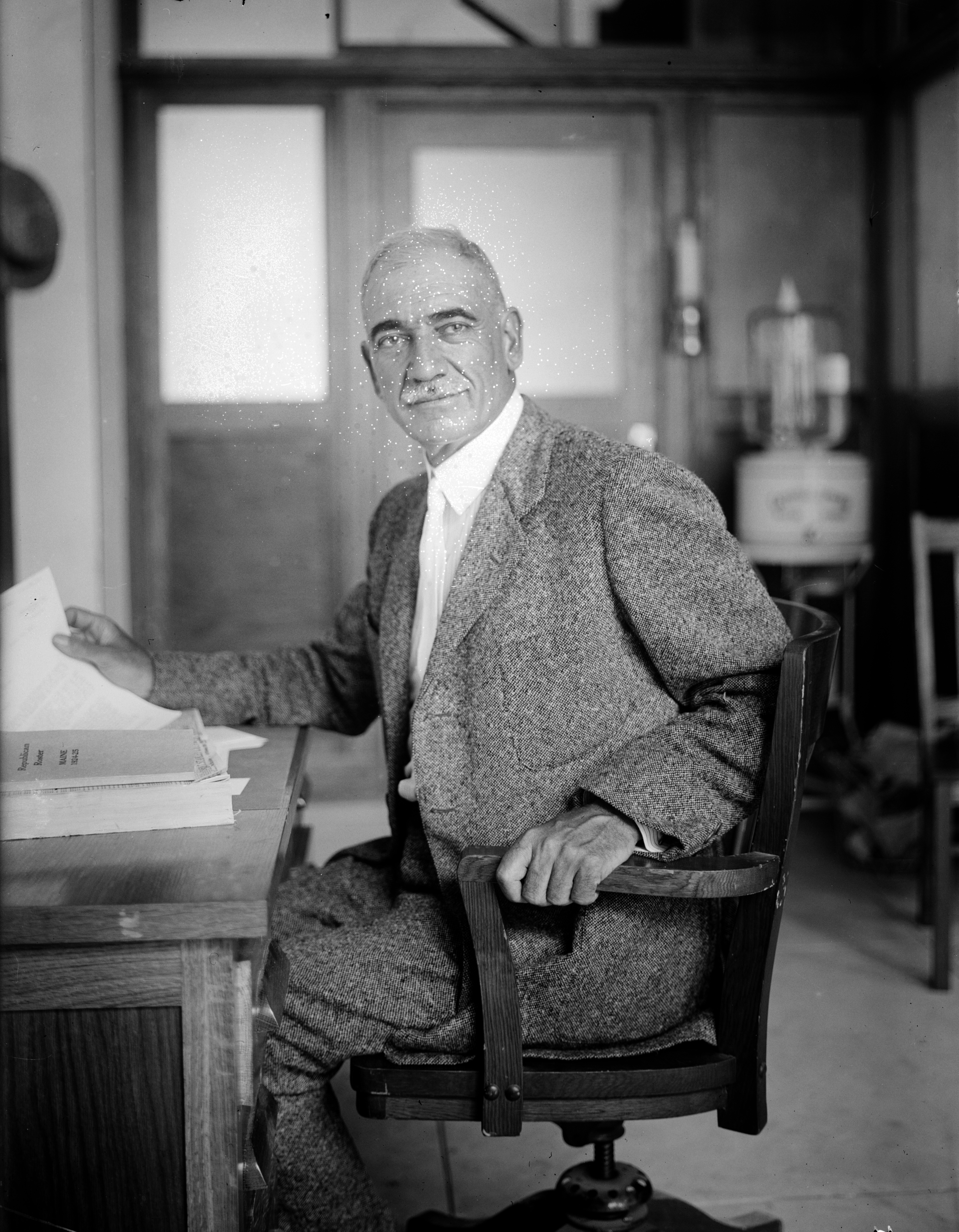
Republican Leader
John Tilson

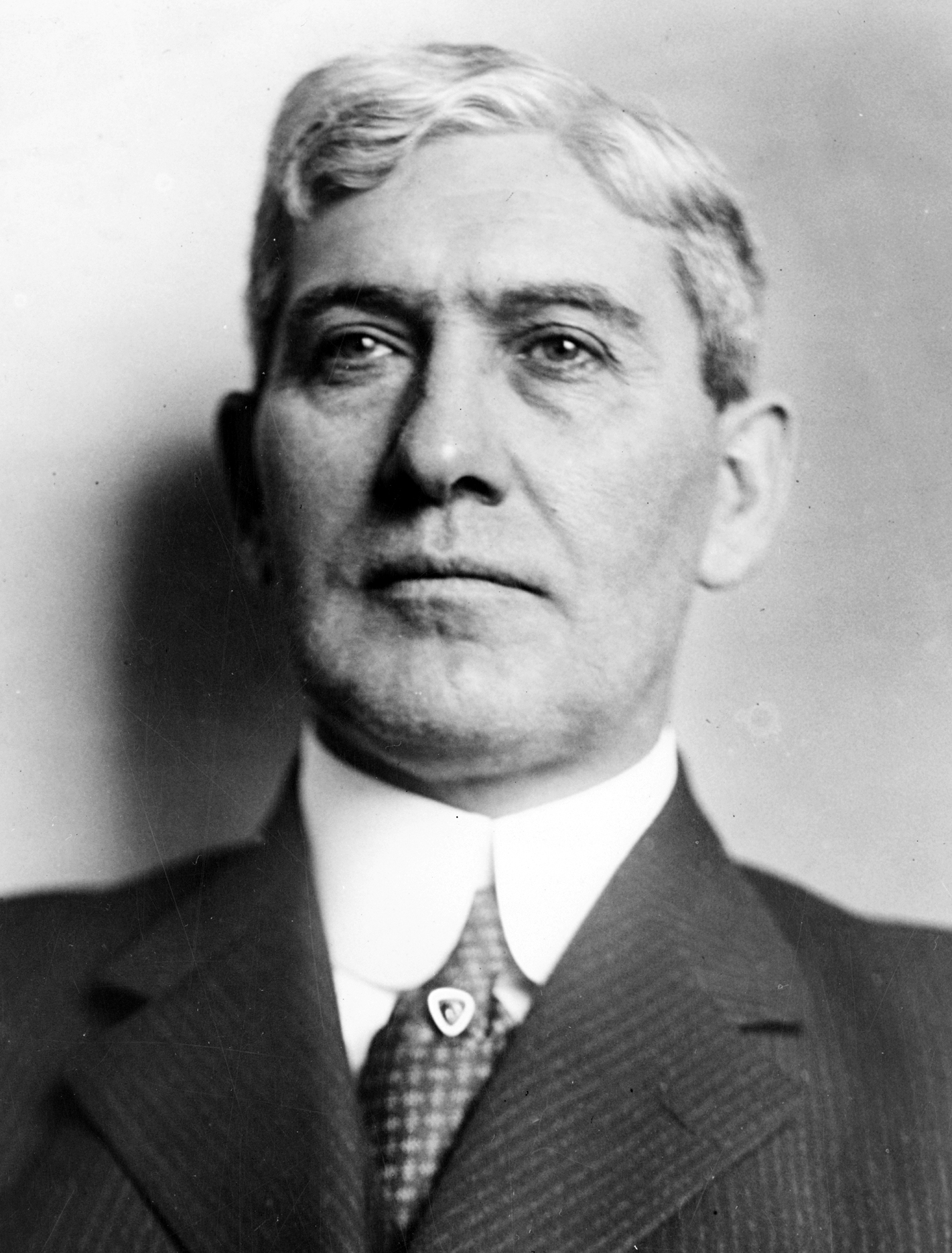
Republican Whip
Albert Vestal

House minority leaders

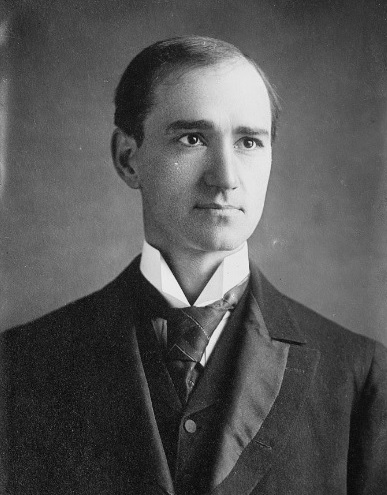
Democratic Leader
Finis Garrett

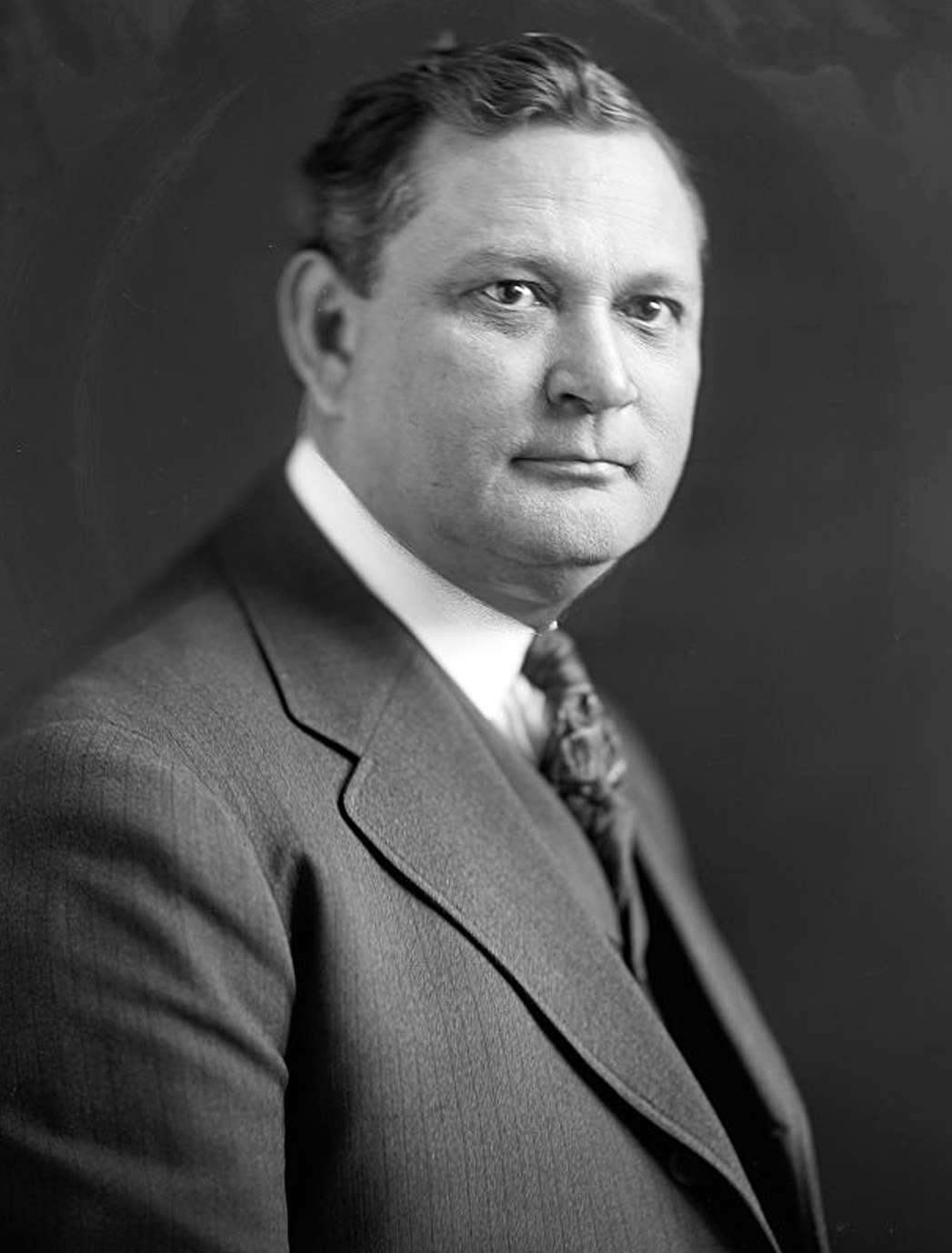
Democratic Whip
William Oldfield

== Changes in membership ==
The count below reflects changes from the beginning of the first session of this Congress.

=== Senate ===
Senate changes
State (class)	Vacated by	Reason for change	Successor	Date of successor's formal installation (Note: When seated or oath administered, not necessarily when service began.)
Pennsylvania (3)	Vacant	Election of William S. Vare was not certified by the governor and the Senate refused to seat him.	Vacant	Seat remained vacant until the next Congress.
Illinois (3)	Vacant	Senator-elect Frank L. Smith was not permitted to qualify and resigned February 9, 1928. Successor elected November 6, 1928.	Otis F. Glenn (R)	December 3, 1928
New Mexico (1)	Andrieus A. Jones (D)	Died December 20, 1927. Successor appointed December 29, 1927. Successor was later not elected to finish the term, see below.	Bronson M. Cutting (R)	December 29, 1927
Michigan (1)	Woodbridge N. Ferris (D)	Died March 23, 1928. Successor appointed March 31, 1928. Successor was then elected November 6, 1928, to finish the term.	Arthur H. Vandenberg (R)	March 31, 1928
Ohio (3)	Frank B. Willis (R)	Died March 30, 1928. Successor appointed April 4, 1928. Successor was later not elected to finish the term, see below.	Cyrus Locher (D)	April 4, 1928
Idaho (3)	Frank R. Gooding (R)	Died June 24, 1928. Successor was appointed to continue the term. Successor was then elected November 6, 1928, to finish the term.	John Thomas (R)	June 30, 1928
New Mexico (1)	Bronson M. Cutting (R)	Appointee did not run to finish the term. Successor elected November 6, 1928.	Octaviano A. Larrazolo (R)	December 7, 1928
Ohio (3)	Cyrus Locher (D)	Appointee lost nomination to finish term. Successor elected November 6, 1928.	Theodore E. Burton (R)	December 15, 1928
Delaware (2)	T. Coleman du Pont (R)	Resigned December 9, 1928. Successor appointed December 10, 1928, to finish the term.	Daniel O. Hastings (R)	December 10, 1928

=== House of Representatives ===
- Replacements: 15
  - Democratic: 1 seat net gain
  - Republican: 1 seat net loss
- Deaths: 16
- Resignations: 7
- Total seats with changes: 23

District	Vacated by	Reason for vacancy	Successor	Date of successor's installation
Ohio 2nd	Vacant	Rep. Ambrose E. B. Stephens died during previous congress	Charles Tatgenhorst Jr. (R)	November 8, 1927
Louisiana 7th	Ladislas Lazaro (D)	Died March 30, 1927	René L. De Rouen (D)	August 23, 1927
New York 35th	Walter W. Magee (R)	Died May 25, 1927	Clarence E. Hancock (R)	November 8, 1927
Colorado 1st	William N. Vaile (R)	Died July 2, 1927	S. Harrison White (D)	November 15, 1927
Oregon 3rd	Maurice E. Crumpacker (R)	Died July 24, 1927	Franklin F. Korell (R)	October 18, 1927
Pennsylvania 1st	James M. Hazlett (R)	Resigned October 20, 1927	James M. Beck (R)	November 8, 1927
Iowa 9th	William R. Green (R)	Resigned March 31, 1928, after being appointed to the United States Court of Claims	Earl W. Vincent (R)	June 4, 1928
Massachusetts 12th	James A. Gallivan (D)	Died April 3, 1928	John W. McCormack (D)	November 6, 1928
Illinois 1st	Martin B. Madden (R)	Died April 27, 1928	Seat remained vacant until next Congress	
New York 32nd	Thaddeus C. Sweet (R)	Died May 1, 1928	Francis D. Culkin (R)	November 6, 1928
Pennsylvania 8th	Thomas S. Butler (R)	Died May 26, 1928	James Wolfenden (R)	November 6, 1928
Oregon 2nd	Nicholas J. Sinnott (R)	Resigned May 31, 1928, after being appointed to the United States Court of Claims	Robert R. Butler (R)	November 6, 1928
Illinois at-large	Henry R. Rathbone (R)	Died July 15, 1928	Seat remained vacant until next Congress	
Philippines at-large	Isauro Gabaldon	Resigned July 16, 1928, after being nominated for election to the Philippine House of Representatives	Seat remained vacant until next Congress	
Alabama 5th	William B. Bowling (D)	Resigned August 16, 1928, after being appointed judge of the 5th Judicial Circuit of Alabama	LaFayette L. Patterson (D)	November 6, 1928
Massachusetts 14th	Louis A. Frothingham (R)	Died August 23, 1928	Richard B. Wigglesworth (R)	November 6, 1928
Missouri 16th	Thomas L. Rubey (D)	Died November 2, 1928	Seat remained vacant until next Congress	
Arkansas 2nd	William Allan Oldfield (D)	Died November 19, 1928	Pearl Peden Oldfield (D)	January 9, 1929
Ohio 22nd	Theodore E. Burton (R)	Resigned December 15, 1928, after winning special election to the U.S. Senate	Seat remained vacant until next Congress	
New York 41st	Clarence MacGregor (R)	Resigned December 28, 1928, after being appointed to the New York Supreme Court	Seat remained vacant until next Congress	
Missouri 4th	Charles L. Faust (R)	Died December 17, 1928	David W. Hopkins (R)	February 5, 1929
Illinois 15th	Edward J. King (R)	Died February 17, 1929	Seat remained vacant until next Congress	
New York 21st	Royal H. Weller (D)	Died March 1, 1929	Seat remained vacant until next Congress	

== Committees ==
Lists of committees and their party leaders for members of the House and Senate committees can be found through the Official Congressional Directory at the bottom of this article. The directory after the pages of terms of service lists committees of the Senate, House (Standing with Subcommittees, Select and Special) and Joint and, after that, House/Senate committee assignments. On the committees section of the House and Senate in the Official Congressional Directory, the committee's members on the first row on the left side shows the chairman of the committee and on the right side shows the ranking member of the committee.

=== Senate ===
- Agriculture and Forestry (Chairman: Charles L. McNary; Ranking Member: Ellison D. Smith)
- Appropriations (Chairman: Francis E. Warren; Ranking Member: Lee S. Overman)
- Audit and Control the Contingent Expenses of the Senate (Chairman: Charles S. Deneen; Ranking Member: Kenneth McKellar)
- Banking and Currency (Chairman: Peter Norbeck; Ranking Member: Duncan U. Fletcher)
- Civil Service (Chairman: Porter H. Dale; Ranking Member: Kenneth McKellar)
- Claims (Chairman: Robert B. Howell; Ranking Member: Park Trammell)
- Commerce (Chairman: Wesley L. Jones; Ranking Member: Duncan U. Fletcher)
- District of Columbia (Chairman: Arthur Capper; Ranking Member: William H. King)
- Education and Labor (Chairman: James Couzens; Ranking Member: Andrieus A. Jones)
- Enrolled Bills (Chairman: Frank L. Greene; Ranking Member: Coleman L. Blease)
- Expenditures in Executive Departments (Chairman: Frederic M. Sackett; Ranking Member: Claude A. Swanson)
- Finance (Chairman: Reed Smoot; Ranking Member: Furnifold M. Simmons)
- Foreign Relations (Chairman: William E. Borah; Ranking Member: Claude A. Swanson)
- Illegal Appointments in Civil Service (Select)
- Immigration (Chairman: Hiram W. Johnson; Ranking Member: William H. King)
- Indian Affairs (Chairman: Lynn J. Frazier; Ranking Member: Henry F. Ashurst)
- Interoceanic Canals (Chairman: Walter Evans Edge; Ranking Member: Thomas J. Walsh)
- Interstate Commerce (Chairman: James Eli Watson; Ranking Member: Ellison D. Smith)
- Irrigation and Reclamation (Chairman: Lawrence C. Phipps; Ranking Member: Morris Sheppard)
- Judiciary (Chairman: George W. Norris; Ranking Member: Lee S. Overman)
- Library (Chairman: Simeon D. Fess; Ranking Member: Kenneth McKellar)
- Manufactures (Chairman: George P. McLean; Ranking Member: Ellison D. Smith)
- Mexican Propaganda (Select)
- Military Affairs (Chairman: David A. Reed; Ranking Member: Duncan U. Fletcher)
- Mines and Mining (Chairman: Tasker L. Oddie; Ranking Member: Thomas J. Walsh)
- Naval Affairs (Chairman: Frederick Hale; Ranking Member: Claude A. Swanson)
- Patents (Chairman: Jesse H. Metcalf; Ranking Member: Ellison D. Smith)
- Pensions (Chairman: Arthur R. Robinson; Ranking Member: Peter Gerry)
- Post Office and Post Roads (Chairman: George H. Moses; Ranking Member: Kenneth McKellar)
- Presidential Campaign Expenditures (Special)
- Printing (Chairman: Hiram Bingham; Ranking Member: Duncan U. Fletcher)
- Privileges and Elections (Chairman: Samuel M. Shortridge; Ranking Member: William H. King)
- Propaganda or Money Alleged Used by Foreign Governments (Special)
- Public Buildings and Grounds (Chairman: Henry W. Keyes; Ranking Member: James A. Reed)
- Public Lands and Surveys (Chairman: Gerald P. Nye; Ranking Member: Key Pittman)
- Rules (Chairman: Charles Curtis; Ranking Member: Lee S. Overman)
- Senatorial Elections (Select)
- Tariff Commission (Select)
- Territories and Insular Possessions (Chairman: Frank B. Willis; Ranking Member: Key Pittman)
- Whole

=== House of Representatives ===
- Accounts (Chairman: Clarence MacGregor; Ranking Member: Ralph Waldo Emerson Gilbert)
- Agriculture (Chairman: Gilbert N. Haugen; Ranking Member: James B. Aswell)
- Alcoholic Liquor Traffic
- Appropriations (Chairman: Martin B. Madden; Ranking Member: Joseph W. Byrns)
- Banking and Currency (Chairman: Louis T. McFadden; Ranking Member: Otis Wingo)
- Census (Chairman: E. Hart Fenn; Ranking Member: John E. Rankin)
- Civil Service (Chairman: Frederick R. Lehlbach; Ranking Member: John C. Box)
- Claims (Chairman: Charles L. Underhill; Ranking Member: Lamar Jeffers)
- Coinage, Weights and Measures (Chairman: Randolph Perkins; Ranking Member: Bill G. Lowrey)
- Disposition of Executive Papers (Chairman: Edward H. Wason; Ranking Member: Robert A. Green)
- District of Columbia (Chairman: Frederick N. Zihlman; Ranking Member: Christopher D. Sullivan)
- Education (Chairman: Daniel A. Reed; Ranking Member: Bill G. Lowrey)
- Election of the President, Vice President and Representatives in Congress (Chairman: Hays B. White; Ranking Member: Lamar Jeffers)
- Elections No.#1 (Chairman: Don B. Colton; Ranking Member: Edward Eslick)
- Elections No.#2 (Chairman: Bird J. Vincent; Ranking Member: Gordon Browning)
- Elections No.#3 (Chairman: Charles L. Gifford; Ranking Member: Guinn Williams)
- Enrolled Bills (Chairman: Guy E. Campbell; Ranking Member: Thomas L. Blanton)
- Expenditures in the Executive Departments (Chairman: William Williamson; Ranking Member: Fritz G. Lanham)
- Flood Control (Chairman: Frank R. Reid; Ranking Member: Riley J. Wilson)
- Foreign Affairs (Chairman: Stephen G. Porter; Ranking Member: J. Charles Linthicum)
- Immigration and Naturalization (Chairman: Albert W. Johnson; Ranking Member: Adolph J. Sabath)
- Indian Affairs (Chairman: Scott Leavitt; Ranking Member: William J. Sears)
- Insular Affairs (Chairman: Edgar R. Kiess; Ranking Member: Christopher D. Sullivan)
- Interstate and Foreign Commerce (Chairman: James S. Parker; Ranking Member: Sam Rayburn)
- Invalid Pensions (Chairman: William T. Fitzgerald; Ranking Member: Mell G. Underwood)
- Irrigation and Reclamation (Chairman: Addison T. Smith; Ranking Member: C.B. Hudspeth)
- Judiciary (Chairman: George S. Graham; Ranking Member: Hatton W. Sumners)
- Labor (Chairman: William F. Kopp; Ranking Member: William P. Connery Jr.)
- Library (Chairman: Robert Luce; Ranking Member: Ralph Waldo Emerson Gilbert)
- Merchant Marine and Fisheries (Chairman: Wallace H. White Jr.; Ranking Member: Ewin L. Davis)
- Military Affairs (Chairman: John M. Morin; Ranking Member: Percy E. Quin)
- Mines and Mining (Chairman: John M. Robsion; Ranking Member: Arthur H. Greenwood)
- Naval Affairs (Chairman: Thomas S. Butler; Ranking Member: Carl Vinson)
- Patents (Chairman: Albert H. Vestal; Ranking Member: Fritz G. Lanham)
- Pensions (Chairman: Harold Knutson; Ranking Member: William C. Hammer)
- Post Office and Post Roads (Chairman: William W. Griest; Ranking Member: Thomas M. Bell)
- Printing (Chairman: Edward M. Beers; Ranking Member: William F. Stevenson)
- Public Buildings and Grounds (Chairman: Richard N. Elliott; Ranking Member: Fritz G. Lanham)
- Public Lands (Chairman: Nicholas J. Sinnott; Ranking Member: John M. Evans)
- Revision of Laws (Chairman: Roy G. Fitzgerald; Ranking Member: Alfred L. Bulwinkle)
- Rivers and Harbors (Chairman: S. Wallace Dempsey; Ranking Member: Joseph J. Mansfield)
- Roads (Chairman: Cassius C. Dowell; Ranking Member: Edward B. Almon)
- Rules (Chairman: Bertrand H. Snell; Ranking Member: Edward W. Pou)
- Standards of Official Conduct
- Territories (Chairman: Charles F. Curry; Ranking Member: William C. Lankford)
- War Claims (Chairman: James G. Strong; Ranking Member: Bill G. Lowrey)
- Ways and Means (Chairman: William R. Green; Ranking Member: John N. Garner)
- World War Veterans' Legislation (Chairman: Royal C. Johnson; Ranking Member: Alfred L. Bulwinkle)
- Whole

=== Joint committees ===
- Conditions of Indian Tribes (Special)
- Disposition of (Useless) Executive Papers
- Harriman Geographic Code System
- Investigation of Northern Pacific Railroad Land Grants
- Determine what Employment may be Furnished Federal Prisoners (Chairman: Rep. George S. Graham)
- Investigate Northern Pacific Lands (Chairman: Rep. Nicholas J. Sinnott)
- The Library (Chairman: Sen. Simeon D. Fess)
- Printing (Chairman: Sen. George H. Moses)
- Taxation (Chairman: Rep. William R. Green)
- To Investigate the Salaries of Officers and Employees of the Senate and the House

== Caucuses ==
- Democratic (House)
- Democratic (Senate)

== Officers ==
=== Legislative branch agency directors ===
- Architect of the Capitol: David Lynn
- Attending Physician of the United States Congress: George Calver, from 1928
- Comptroller General of the United States: John R. McCarl
- Librarian of Congress: Herbert Putnam
- Public Printer of the United States: George H. Carter

=== Senate ===
- Chaplain: John J. Muir, (Baptist), until December 5, 1927
  - ZeBarney T. Phillips (Episcopal), from December 5, 1927
- Secretary: Edwin P. Thayer
- Librarian: Edward C. Goodwin
- Sergeant at Arms: David S. Barry

=== House of Representatives ===
- Chaplain: James S. Montgomery (Methodist)
- Clerk: William T. Page
- Doorkeeper: Bert W. Kennedy
- Reading Clerks: Patrick Joseph Haltigan (D) and Alney E. Chaffee (R)
- Sergeant at Arms: Joseph G. Rodgers
- Parliamentarian: Lewis Deschler, from 1928
- Postmaster: Frank W. Collier

== See also ==
- 1926 United States elections (elections leading to this Congress)
  - 1926 United States Senate elections
  - 1926 United States House of Representatives elections
- 1928 United States elections (elections during this Congress, leading to the next Congress)
  - 1928 United States presidential election
  - 1928 United States Senate elections
  - 1928 United States House of Representatives elections
