= 1929 United States House of Representatives elections =

There were elections in 1929 to the United States House of Representatives:

== 70th Congress ==
District	Incumbent			This race	
District	Member	Party	First elected	Results	Candidates
Arkansas 2	William A. Oldfield	Democratic	1908	Incumbent died November 19, 1928. New member elected January 9, 1929 to finish her husband's term. Democratic hold.	▌ ✓ Pearl P. Oldfield (Democratic); Unopposed
Missouri 4	Charles L. Faust	Republican	1921 (special)	Incumbent died December 17, 1928. New member elected February 5, 1929. Republican hold.	▌ ✓ David W. Hopkins (Republican) 52.98%; ▌Louis V. Stigall (Democratic) 47.02%

== 71st Congress ==
Elections are listed by date and district.

District	Incumbent			This race	
District	Member	Party	First elected	Results	Candidates
Arkansas 2	William A. Oldfield	Democratic	1908	Incumbent died November 19, 1928. New member elected January 9, 1929. Democratic hold.	▌ ✓ Pearl P. Oldfield (Democratic) 53.01%; ▌R. Walter Tucker (Independent) 44.99%
Missouri 4	Charles L. Faust	Republican	1921 (special)	Incumbent died December 17, 1928. New member elected February 5, 1929. Republican hold.	▌ ✓ David W. Hopkins (Republican) 53.02%; ▌Louis V. Stigall (Democratic) 46.98%
Kentucky 3	Charles W. Roark	Republican	1928	Incumbent died April 5, 1929. New member elected June 1, 1929. Democratic gain.	▌ ✓ John W. Moore (Democratic) 52.93%; ▌Thurman B. Dixon (Republican) 47.07%
Pennsylvania 12	John J. Casey	Democratic	1912; 1916 (lost); 1918; 1920 (lost); 1922; 1924 (lost); 1926	Incumbent died May 5, 1929. New member elected June 1, 1929. Republican gain.	▌ ✓ C. Murray Turpin (Republican) 50.94%; ▌Sarah C. Casey (Democratic) 49.06%
Minnesota 5	Walter Newton	Republican	1918	Incumbent resigned June 30, 1929, after being appointed secretary to President Herbert Hoover. New member elected July 17, 1929. Republican hold.	▌ ✓ William I. Nolan (Republican) 46.57%; ▌Einar Hoidale (Democratic) 39.80%; ▌Ernest Lundeen (Farmer–Labor) 13.63%
Louisiana 3	Whitmell P. Martin	Democratic	1912	Incumbent died April 6, 1929. New member elected August 6, 1929. Democratic hold.	▌ ✓ Numa F. Montet (Democratic) 57.71%; ▌M. E. Norman (Republican) 42.29%
Georgia 5	Leslie J. Steele	Democratic	1926	Incumbent died July 24, 1929. New member elected October 2, 1929. Democratic hold.	▌ ✓ Robert Ramspeck (Democratic) 71.77%; ▌Hooper Alexander (Independent) 26.94%; ▌James H. Palmer (Independent) 1.28%
Minnesota 7	Ole J. Kvale	Farmer–Labor	1922	Incumbent died September 11, 1929. New member elected October 16, 1929. Farmer–Labor hold.	▌ ✓ Paul J. Kvale (Farmer–Labor) 73.17%; ▌J. C. Morrison (Republican) 26.83%
New York 21	Royal Hurlburt Weller	Democratic	1922	Incumbent died March 1, 1929. New member elected November 5, 1929. Democratic hold.	▌ ✓ Joseph A. Gavagan (Democratic) 74.98%; ▌Hubert T. Delany (Republican) 37.91%; ▌Frank R. Crosswaith (Socialist) 5.06%; ▌Richard B. Moore (Communist) 0.24%; ▌George H. Mann (Lincoln) 0.07%
