= 1928 United States Senate special election in Ohio =

- November 6, 1928
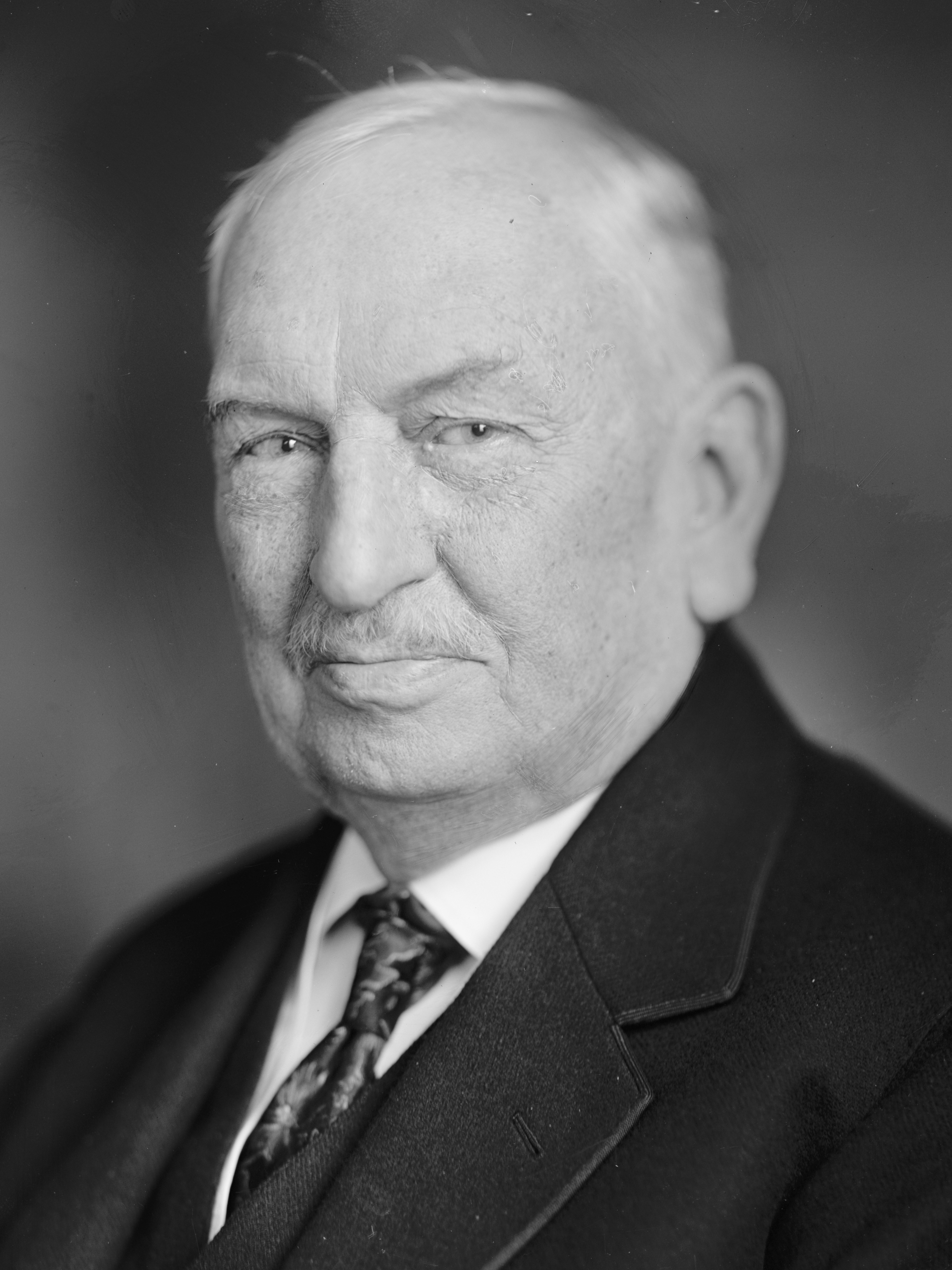

Nominee	Theodore E. Burton	Graham P. Hunt
Party	Republican	Democratic
Popular vote	1,429,554	856,807
Percentage	62.43%	37.42%
- County results Burton: 50–60% 60–70% 70–80% Hunt: 50–60% 60–70%
U.S. senator before election
Cyrus Locher
Democratic
Elected U.S. Senator
Theodore E. Burton
Republican

The 1928 United States Senate special election in Ohio was held on November 6, 1928, to elect a successor to Frank B. Willis, who died in office in March 1928. Republican U.S. Representative Theodore E. Burton, who previously held this seat from 1909 to 1915, won the open race to succeed him.

== Background ==
Incumbent Republican Senator Frank B. Willis died in office on March 30, 1928. Governor of Ohio Vic Donahey appointed Cyrus Locher to fill the vacant seat until a successor could be duly elected. The special election to fill the seat was scheduled for November 6, 1928, concurrent with the general election for President of the United States, Governor, and Ohio's other U.S. Senate seat.

== Democratic primary ==
=== Candidates ===
- Graham P. Hunt, Cincinnati resident
- Cyrus Locher, interim U.S. Senator

The primary was contested over the issue of Prohibition; Locher was an advocate of the policy, allied with the Anti-Saloon League, while Hunt was an opponent.

== Republican primary ==
=== Candidates ===
- Theodore E. Burton, U.S. Representative and former U.S. Senator (1909–1915)
- H.D. Cook
- Jacob S. Coxey Sr., former populist activist, welfare advocate, and perennial candidate
- Charles W. F. Dick, former U.S. Senator (1904–11)
- Carrington T. Marshall, Chief Justice of the Ohio Supreme Court

== General election ==
=== Candidates ===
- Israel Amter (Workers)
- Theodore E. Burton, U.S. Representative from Cleveland and former U.S. Senator (1909–1915)
- Graham P. Hunt (Democratic)
- Anna K. Storck (Socialist Labor)

=== Results ===
1928 U.S. Senate special election in Ohio
Party	Candidate	Votes	%	±%
Republican	Theodore E. Burton	1,429,554	62.43%	▲9.24
Democratic	Graham P. Hunt	856,807	37.42%	▼9.18
Communist	Israel Amter	2,062	0.09%	N/A
Socialist Labor	Anna K. Storck	1,389	0.06%	▼0.15
Total votes		2,289,812	100.00%	

== See also ==
- 1928 United States Senate elections
