= Iron City, Alabama =

- Unincorporated community
- Location within Alabama Location within the United States
- Coordinates: 33°40′04″N 85°39′51″W
- Country: United States
- State: Alabama
- County: Calhoun
- Elevation: 751 ft (229 m)
- Time zone: UTC-6 (Central (CST))
  - Summer (DST): UTC-5 (CDT)
- Area codes: 256 & 938
- GNIS feature ID: 159848

Iron City, also spelled Ironcity, is an unincorporated community in Calhoun County, Alabama, United States.

== History ==
Iron City was named after the iron ore found in the area. It was located on the Southern Railway route between Muscadine and Birmingham. A post office called Ironcity was established in 1889, and remained in operation until it was discontinued in 1935.

== Notable people ==
- William B. Bowling, U.S. Representative from 1920 to 1928
- Lloyd Greer, architect
