= LaFayette L. Patterson =

American politician

Member of the U.S. House of Representatives from Alabama's 5th district
- In office November 6, 1928 – March 3, 1933
- Preceded by: William B. Bowling
- Succeeded by: Miles C. Allgood

Personal details
- Born: LaFayette Lee Patterson; August 23, 1888 Delta, Alabama
- Died: March 3, 1987 (aged 98) Birmingham, Alabama
- Party: Democratic
- Education: Jacksonville State Teachers College, Birmingham-Southern College, Stanford University
- Profession: teacher

LaFayette Lee Patterson (August 23, 1888 – March 3, 1987) was a United States representative from Alabama. He served three terms in the U.S. Congress, from 1928 to 1933.

Born near Delta in Clay County, Alabama, Patterson attended rural schools. He worked in agriculture and as a teacher in the rural schools. He graduated from Jacksonville State Teachers College in 1922, from Birmingham-Southern College in 1924, and from Stanford University in 1927. From 1924 to 1926 he was the superintendent of education for Tallapoosa County, Alabama.

Patterson was elected as a Democrat to the 70th Congress to fill the vacancy caused by the resignation of William B. Bowling. He was reelected to the two succeeding Congresses and served from November 6, 1928, to March 3, 1933. He was an unsuccessful candidate for renomination in 1932.

Patterson moved to Gadsden, Alabama, in 1931. He worked as a field representative for the Agricultural Adjustment Administration from 1933 to 1943, as a special assistant to the War Food Administration from 1943 to 1945, and as a special adviser to the Secretary of Agriculture from 1945 to 1947. He remained active in his political party's affairs, serving as a liaison officer for the Democratic National Committee in 1948 and as a delegate-at-large to the 1952 Democratic National Convention.

From 1948 to 1951 he was an assistant professor of history at his alma mater, Jacksonville State College. He moved to Raleigh, North Carolina, in 1952 where he worked in the travel business. He returned to Alabama in 1965, living in Montgomery, and resumed his profession as a teacher. Patterson died in Birmingham on March 3, 1987, at age 98. He was buried at Bethlehem Cemetery in New Site, Alabama.

U.S. House of Representatives
Preceded by William B. Bowling	Member of the U.S. House of Representatives from Alabama's 5th congressional district 1928-1933	Succeeded by Miles C. Allgood
