= Delta, Alabama =

Delta
- Census-designated place
- Location of Delta in Clay County, Alabama.
- Coordinates: 33°26′49″N 85°40′29″W
- Country: United States
- State: Alabama
- County: Clay

Area
  - Total: 7.89 sq mi (20.44 km^{2})
  - Land: 7.79 sq mi (20.17 km^{2})
  - Water: 0.10 sq mi (0.27 km^{2})
- Elevation: 1,034 ft (315 m)

Population (2020)
  - Total: 260
  - Density: 33.4/sq mi (12.89/km^{2})
- Time zone: UTC-6 (CST)
  - Summer (DST): UTC-5 (CDT)
- Area codes: 256 & 938
- GNIS feature ID: 2582670

Delta is a census-designated place and unincorporated community in Clay County, Alabama, United States. Its population was 260 as of the 2020 census.

== Geography ==
=== Climate ===
The climate in Delta is characterized by hot, humid summers and generally mild to cool winters. According to the Köppen Climate Classification system, this area has a humid subtropical climate, abbreviated "Cfa" on climate maps.

Climate data for Anniston Regional Airport
Month	Jan	Feb	Mar	Apr	May	Jun	Jul	Aug	Sep	Oct	Nov	Dec	Year
Mean daily maximum °F (°C)	57 (14)	60 (16)	69 (21)	77 (25)	82 (28)	90 (32)	91 (33)	91 (33)	86 (30)	76 (24)	66 (19)	59 (15)	75 (24)
Daily mean °F (°C)	44 (7)	47 (8)	55 (13)	63 (17)	70 (21)	77 (25)	79 (26)	79 (26)	74 (23)	63 (17)	52 (11)	47 (8)	63 (17)
Mean daily minimum °F (°C)	34 (1)	36 (2)	44 (7)	51 (11)	59 (15)	67 (19)	70 (21)	70 (21)	64 (18)	52 (11)	41 (5)	38 (3)	52 (11)
Average precipitation inches (mm)	6.2 (160)	4.9 (120)	7 (180)	5.2 (130)	4.1 (100)	4.1 (100)	5.2 (130)	3.1 (79)	4.2 (110)	3.4 (86)	3.8 (97)	5.3 (130)	56.5 (1,422)
Average precipitation days	10	9	10	8	7	9	11	8	7	6	7	10	102
Mean daily daylight hours	10.7	11.5	12.4	13.5	14.4	14.8	14.6	13.8	12.8	11.7	10.9	10.4	12.6
Source 1: AreaVibes
Source 2: Weatherbase

== Demographics ==
Historical population
Census	Pop.	Note	%±
2010	197		—
2020	260		32.0%
U.S. Decennial Census

Delta was listed as a census designated place in the 2010 U.S. census.

Delta CDP, Alabama – Racial and ethnic composition Note: the US Census treats Hispanic/Latino as an ethnic category. This table excludes Latinos from the racial categories and assigns them to a separate category. Hispanics/Latinos may be of any race.
Race / Ethnicity (NH = Non-Hispanic)	Pop 2010	Pop 2020	% 2010	% 2020
White alone (NH)	190	242	96.45%	93.08%
Black or African American alone (NH)	0	8	0.00%	3.08%
Native American or Alaska Native alone (NH)	5	5	2.54%	1.92%
Asian alone (NH)	0	0	0.00%	0.00%
Native Hawaiian or Pacific Islander alone (NH)	0	0	0.00%	0.00%
Other race alone (NH)	0	2	0.00%	0.77%
Mixed race or Multiracial (NH)	1	2	0.51%	0.77%
Hispanic or Latino (any race)	1	1	0.51%	0.38%
Total	197	260	100.00%	100.00%

== Notable people ==
- LaFayette L. Patterson, United States Representative born in Delta
