= Norbeck-Williamson Act of 1929 =

U.S. Congress legislation

- Other short titles: Mount Rushmore National Memorial Commission Act; Mount Rushmore National Memorial Construction Act
- Long title: An Act creating the Mount Rushmore National Memorial Commission and defining its purposes and powers.
- Nicknames: Mount Rushmore National Memorial Act of 1929
- Enacted by: the 70th United States Congress
- Effective: February 25, 1929

Citations
- Public law: Pub. L. 70–805
- Statutes at Large: 45 Stat. 1300

Legislative history
- Introduced in the Senate as S. 3848 by Peter Norbeck (R–SD) on May 17, 1928; Passed the Senate on May 16, 1928 (Passed); Passed the House on May 28, 1928 (Passed); Reported by the joint conference committee on February 8, 1929; agreed to by the House on February 21, 1929 (Agreed) and by the Senate on February 22, 1929 (Agreed); Signed into law by President Calvin Coolidge on February 25, 1929

Norbeck-Williamson Act of 1929 or Mount Rushmore National Memorial Act of 1929 established the Mount Rushmore National Memorial Commission defining the powers and purpose of the twelve member committee. The Act of Congress authorized the Mount Harney Memorial Association of South Dakota to stone carve models of George Washington, Thomas Jefferson, Abraham Lincoln, and Theodore Roosevelt in the Harney National Forest encompassed by the Black Hills National Forest. The granite sculpture was to be created in accordance with the rock relief designs by Gutzon Borglum.

In 1928, the 70th Congressional session members Peter Norbeck and William Williamson formulated the code of law for the Mount Rushmore National Memorial Act. The Senate bill was passed by the United States Congressional session and enacted into law by the 30th President of the United States Calvin Coolidge on February 29, 1929.

== Clauses of the Act ==
The Mount Rushmore National Memorial Commission Act was drafted as six sections describing the purposes of the United States statute.

Sec. 1 - Commission Composition and Creation

Members allowance for expenses
Compensation for secretary

Sec. 2 - Organization

Selection of treasurer
Membership of executive committee

Sec. 3 - Completion of Memorial

Sec. 4 - Authority

Mount Harney Memorial Association property rights
Disbursement and receivables of funds
Employment of artists and sculptors
Other powers

Sec. 5 - Federal Contribution Limitation

Advance to treasurer of appropriated funds
Condition of funds to treasurer

Sec. 6 - Report to Congress

== Amendments to 1929 Act ==
U.S. Congressional amendments to the Mount Rushmore National Memorial Commission Act.

Date of Enactment	Public Law Number	U.S. Statute Citation	U.S. Legislative Bill	U.S. Presidential Administration
June 26, 1934	P.L. 73-471	48 Stat. 1223	S. 3533	Franklin D. Roosevelt
August 29, 1935	P.L. 74-393	49 Stat. 962	S. 3204	Franklin D. Roosevelt
June 15, 1938	P.L. 75-629	52 Stat. 694	H.R. 10462	Franklin D. Roosevelt
May 22, 1940	P.L. 76-519	54 Stat. 218	H.R. 8357	Franklin D. Roosevelt

== See also ==
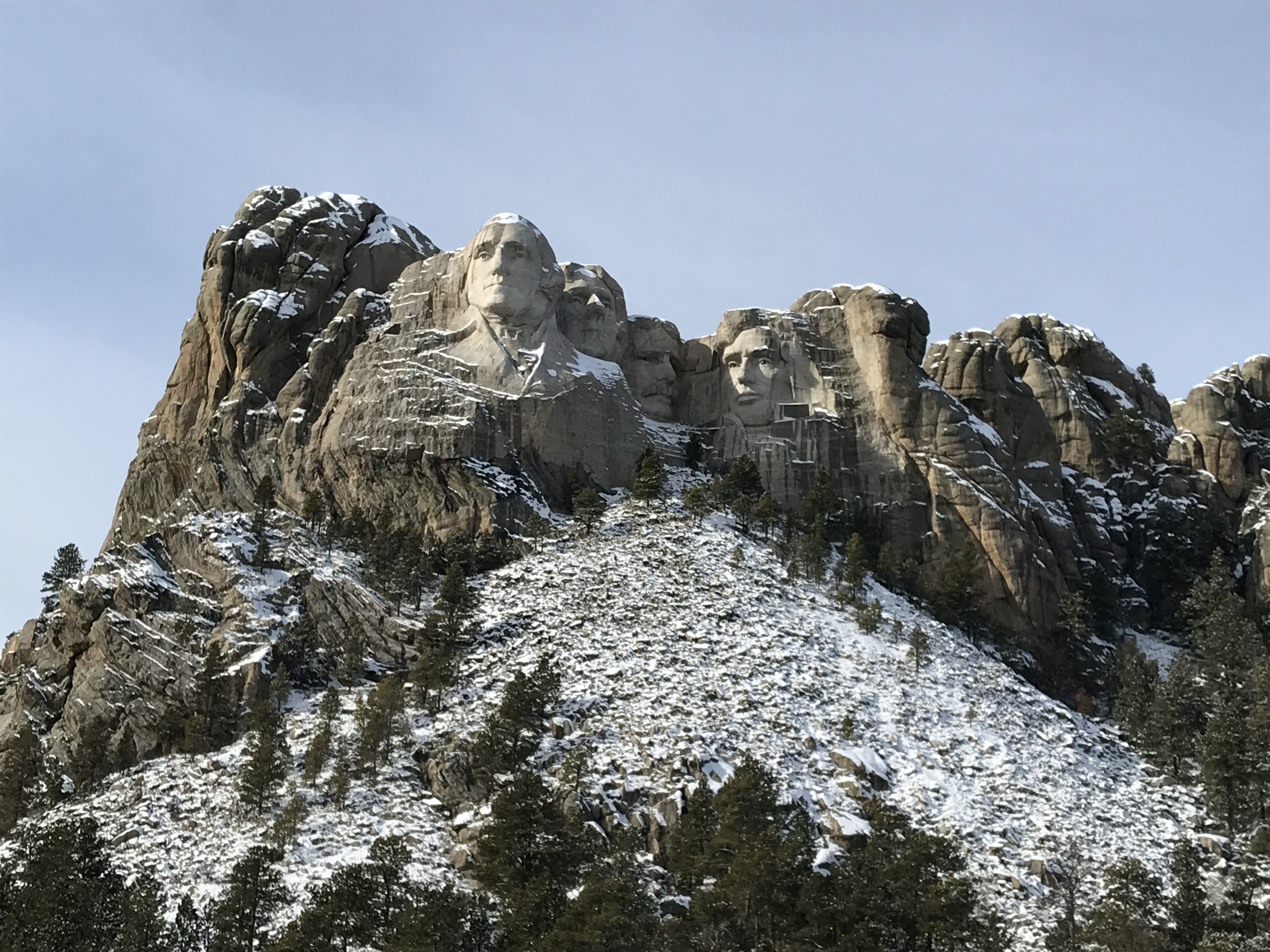
Mount Rushmore in Winter

Black Hills Gold Rush	Keystone, South Dakota
Carl Gunderson	Lincoln Borglum
Charles E. Rushmore	Lincoln Borglum Museum
Construction of Mount Rushmore	Lorado Taft
Custer, South Dakota	Needles Highway
Doane Robinson	Seated Lincoln
Gilbert Fite	Sheridan, South Dakota

== Documentary Film Bibliography ==
- Mount Rushmore - An Evolving Idea on YouTube
- Mount Rushmore - Telling America's Stories on YouTube
- Mount Rushmore Was Supposed to Look Very Different on YouTube
- Mount Rushmore - Who are the Faces on the Mountain? on YouTube
- Mount Rushmore - Winter at the Memorial on YouTube
- The Hall of Records, A Not So Secret Room on YouTube
- The Sculptor's Studio Talk at Mount Rushmore National Memorial on YouTube
