= William A. Oldfield =

American politician

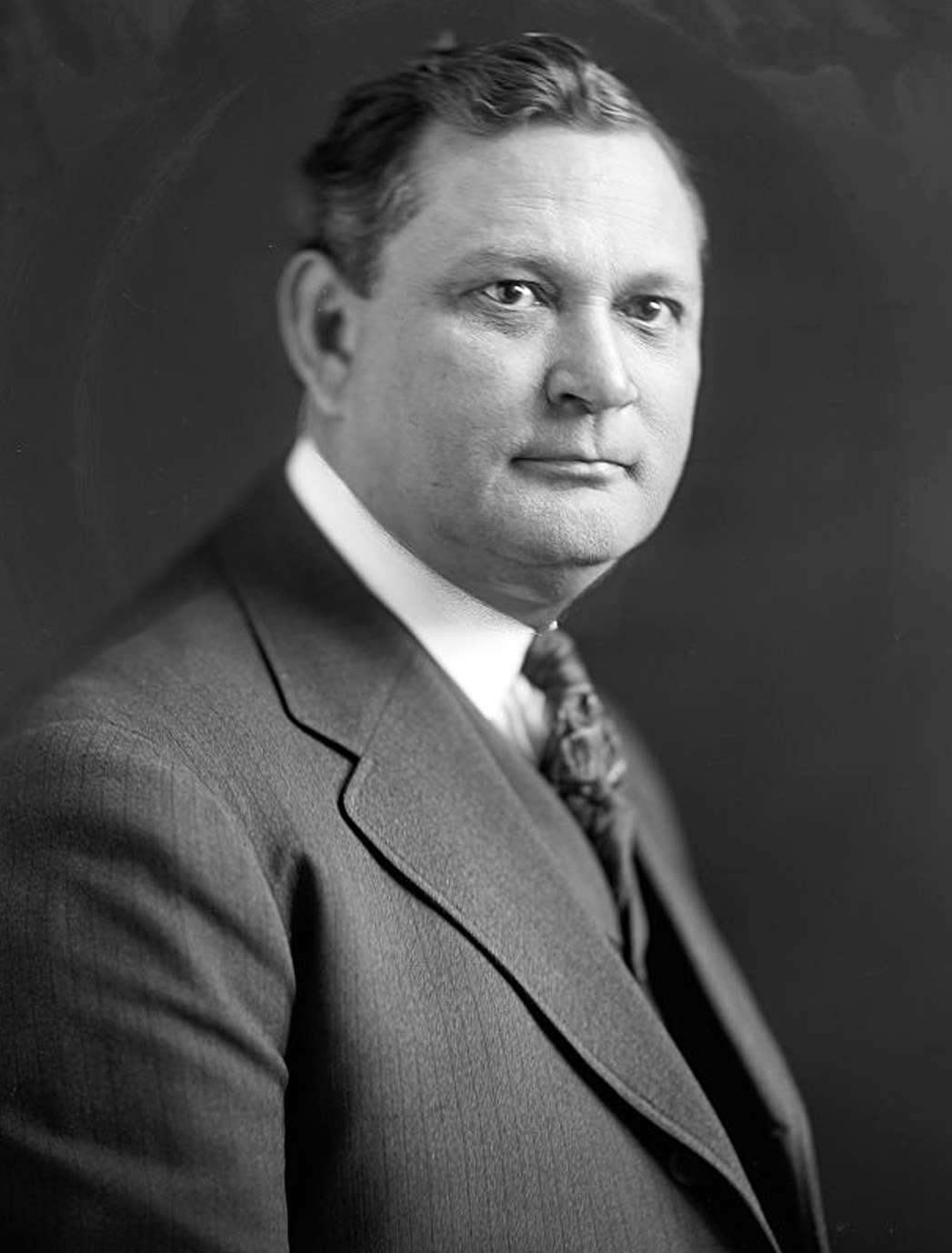
- Harris & Ewing Collection, Library of Congress

Member of the U.S. House of Representatives from Arkansas's 2nd district
- In office March 4, 1909 – November 19, 1928
- Preceded by: Stephen Brundidge, Jr.
- Succeeded by: Pearl P. Oldfield

Personal details
- Born: February 4, 1874 Franklin, Arkansas, U.S.
- Died: November 19, 1928 (aged 54) Washington, D.C., U.S.
- Resting place: Oak Lawn Cemetery, Batesville, Arkansas
- Party: Democratic
- Spouse: Pearl P. Oldfield (m. 1901, died)
- Education: Arkansas College; Cumberland School of Law
- Profession: Attorney

Military service
- Allegiance: United States of America
- Branch/service: United States Army
- Years of service: 1898–1899
- Rank: first lieutenant
- Unit: 2nd Arkansas Infantry Regiment
- Battles/wars: Spanish–American War

William Allan Oldfield (February 4, 1874 – November 19, 1928) was an American lawyer and politician who served as a U.S. representative from Arkansas from 1909 until his death.

== Early life ==
Born in Franklin, Arkansas, Oldfield was the son of blacksmith Milton Oldfield and his wife, Mary Ann (Matheny) Oldfield. He attended the public schools of Franklin and graduated from Melbourne High School in 1892. He began attendance at Arkansas College in Batesville. He graduated in 1896 and became a school teacher and principal in Richmond, Arkansas, while also studying law.

== Military service ==
In 1898, Oldfield enlisted for the Spanish–American War as a private in Company M, 2nd Arkansas Infantry Regiment. He was promoted to first sergeant before receiving a commission as a first lieutenant, and he was mustered out in March 1899.

== Career ==
After returning home, Oldfield graduated from Cumberland University's law school in Lebanon, Tennessee, in 1900, attained admission to the bar, and commenced practice in Batesville. A Democrat, he was prosecuting attorney of Independence County from 1902 to 1906. In 1906, Oldfield was an unsuccessful candidate for the U.S. House.

== Congressman ==
In 1908, Oldfield won election to the 61st Congress. He was reelected ten times and served from March 4, 1909, until his death. Oldfield was chairman of the Committee on Patents in the 62nd and 63rd Congresses, and Minority Whip from the 67th through 70th Congress. In addition, he served on the Ways and Means Committee and served as chairman of the Democratic Congressional Campaign Committee.

Oldfield won reelection to the 71st Congress in 1928, but died before the term started in March 1929. He was succeeded in Congress by his wife Pearl P. Oldfield.

== Death and burial ==
Oldfield died in Washington, D.C., on November 19, 1928. He was buried at Oak Lawn Cemetery in Batesville.

== Family ==
In 1901, Oldfield married Fannie Pearl Peden. They were married until his death, and had no children.

== See also ==
- List of members of the United States Congress who died in office (1900–1949)

== Sources ==
=== Internet ===
- "William Allan Oldfield (1874–1928)". Encyclopedia of Arkansas History and Culture. Little Rock, AR: Central Arkansas Library System. 2018.

=== Books ===
- Spencer, Thomas E. (1998). Where They're Buried. Baltimore, MD: Clearfield Company. p. 152. ISBN 978-0-8063-4823-0.
- United States House of Representatives (1929). Congressional Record: Proceedings and Debates of the 71st Congress. Washington, DC: U.S. Government Printing Office.

U.S. House of Representatives
Preceded by Stephen Brundidge, Jr.	Member of the U.S. House of Representatives from Arkansas's 2nd congressional district March 4, 1909 – November 19, 1928	Succeeded by Pearl P. Oldfield
