= Theodore E. Burton =

American politician (1851–1929)

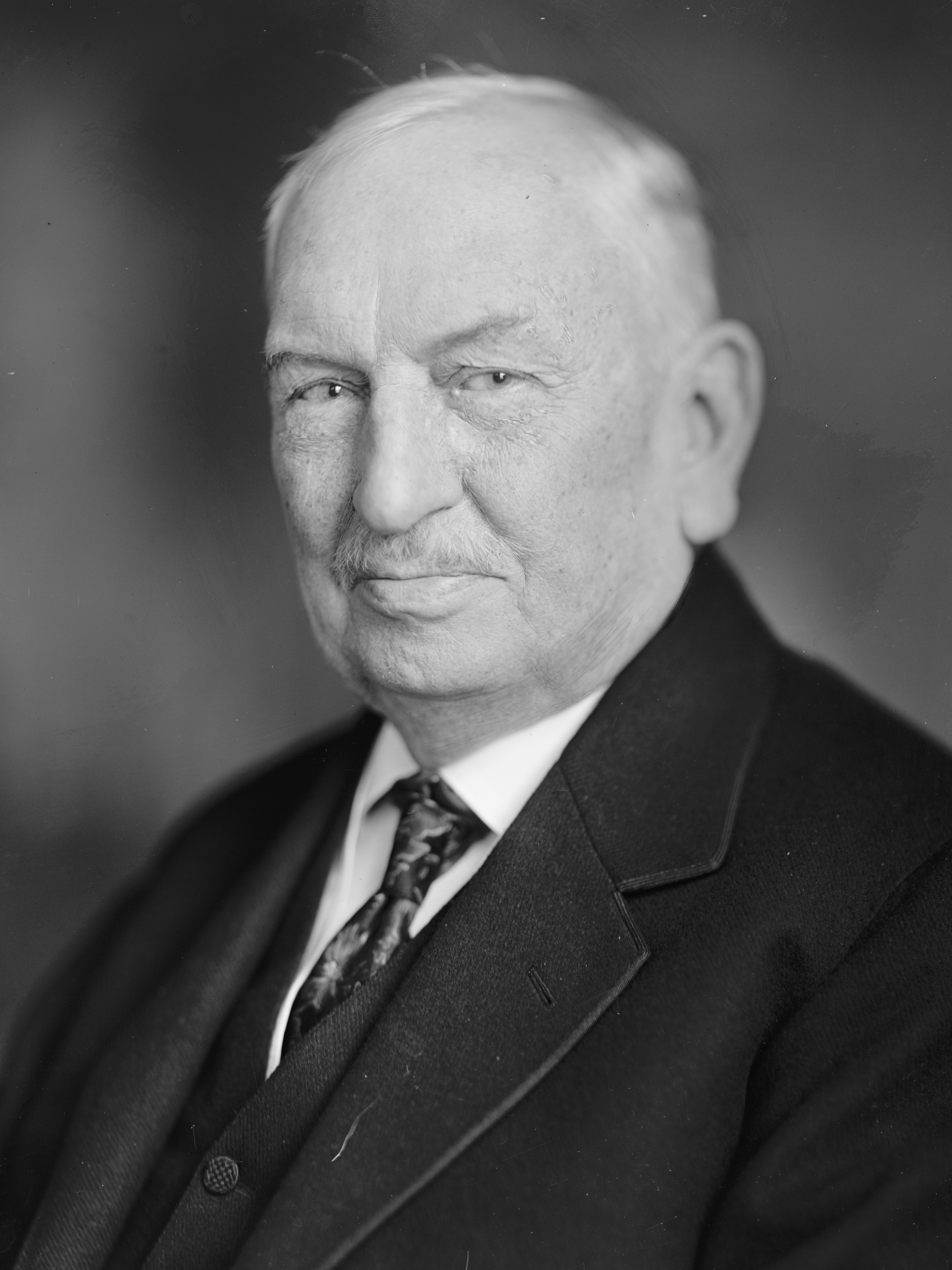
- Burton, 1905–1929

United States Senator from Ohio
- In office December 15, 1928 – October 28, 1929
- Preceded by: Cyrus Locher
- Succeeded by: Roscoe C. McCulloch
- In office March 4, 1909 – March 3, 1915
- Preceded by: Joseph B. Foraker
- Succeeded by: Warren G. Harding

Member of the U.S. House of Representatives from Ohio
- In office March 4, 1921 – December 15, 1928
- Preceded by: Henry I. Emerson
- Succeeded by: Chester C. Bolton
- Constituency: 22nd district
- In office March 4, 1895 – March 3, 1909
- Preceded by: Tom L. Johnson
- Succeeded by: James H. Cassidy
- Constituency: 21st district
- In office March 4, 1889 – March 3, 1891
- Preceded by: Martin A. Foran
- Succeeded by: Tom L. Johnson
- Constituency: 21st district

Member of the Cleveland City Council
- In office 1886–1888

Personal details
- Born: Theodore Elijah Burton; December 20, 1851 Jefferson, Ohio, US
- Died: October 28, 1929 (aged 77) Washington, D.C., US
- Resting place: Lake View Cemetery
- Party: Republican
- Education: Grinnell College; Oberlin College (BA)
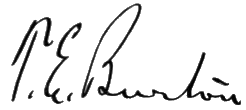
- Signature

Theodore Elijah Burton (December 20, 1851 – October 28, 1929) was an American attorney and Republican politician from Ohio. He served in the United States House of Representatives, the U.S. Senate, and the Cleveland City Council.

== Early years ==
Burton was born in Jefferson, Ashtabula County, Ohio, the son of Elizabeth (Grant) and The Rev. William Burton. He attended the public schools, Grand River Institute, Austinburg, Ohio, and Iowa College, Grinnell, Iowa. He graduated from Oberlin College in 1872. He studied law in Chicago with Lyman Trumbull, friend of Lincoln, and Senator of the United States for eighteen years. He commenced the practice of law in 1875, becoming a prominent attorney in Cleveland. His first public office was member of Cleveland City Council, serving from 1886 through 1888, after which time he was elected to the United States House of Representatives.

== Career ==
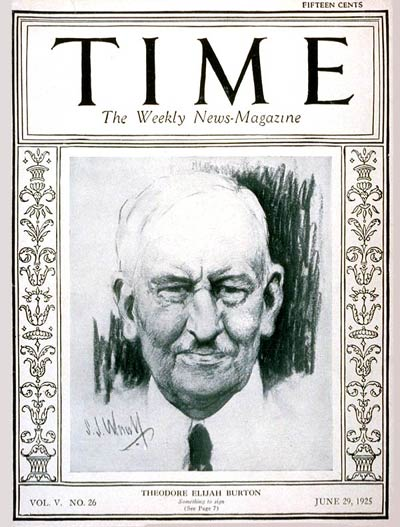
Time cover, 29 Jun 1925

He was elected to the House of Representatives for the Fifty-first United States Congress in 1888 from the Ohio 21st District in Cleveland but was defeated for re-election in 1890 by his Democratic Party opponent, Tom L. Johnson. He was not the Republican nominee in 1892, but was nominated again in 1894 and won election to the Fifty-fourth United States Congress, this time defeating his erstwhile opponent and still incumbent, Tom L. Johnson. He was re-elected seven times, serving in the House until 1908.

He was noted for his work in preserving Niagara Falls and for opposing wasteful waterways projects. President Theodore Roosevelt appointed him chairman of the Inland Waterways Commission in 1907 and the National Waterways Commission in 1909. He also sponsored the legislation authorizing the construction of the Panama Canal.

He opposed wasteful spending in general, and despite his background as a corporate lawyer, he resisted the influence of big business. In his first term he co-sponsored the Sherman Anti-Trust Act.

After his re-election in 1908, he was elected to the Senate, and resigned his House seat. He served as Chairman of the Committee on Rivers and Harbors.

He did not seek a second Senate term. Instead, he moved to New York City, and worked in banking for several years.

In 1916, he was considered a possible candidate for president, and received 77½ votes on the first ballot (out of 987) at the Republican national convention.

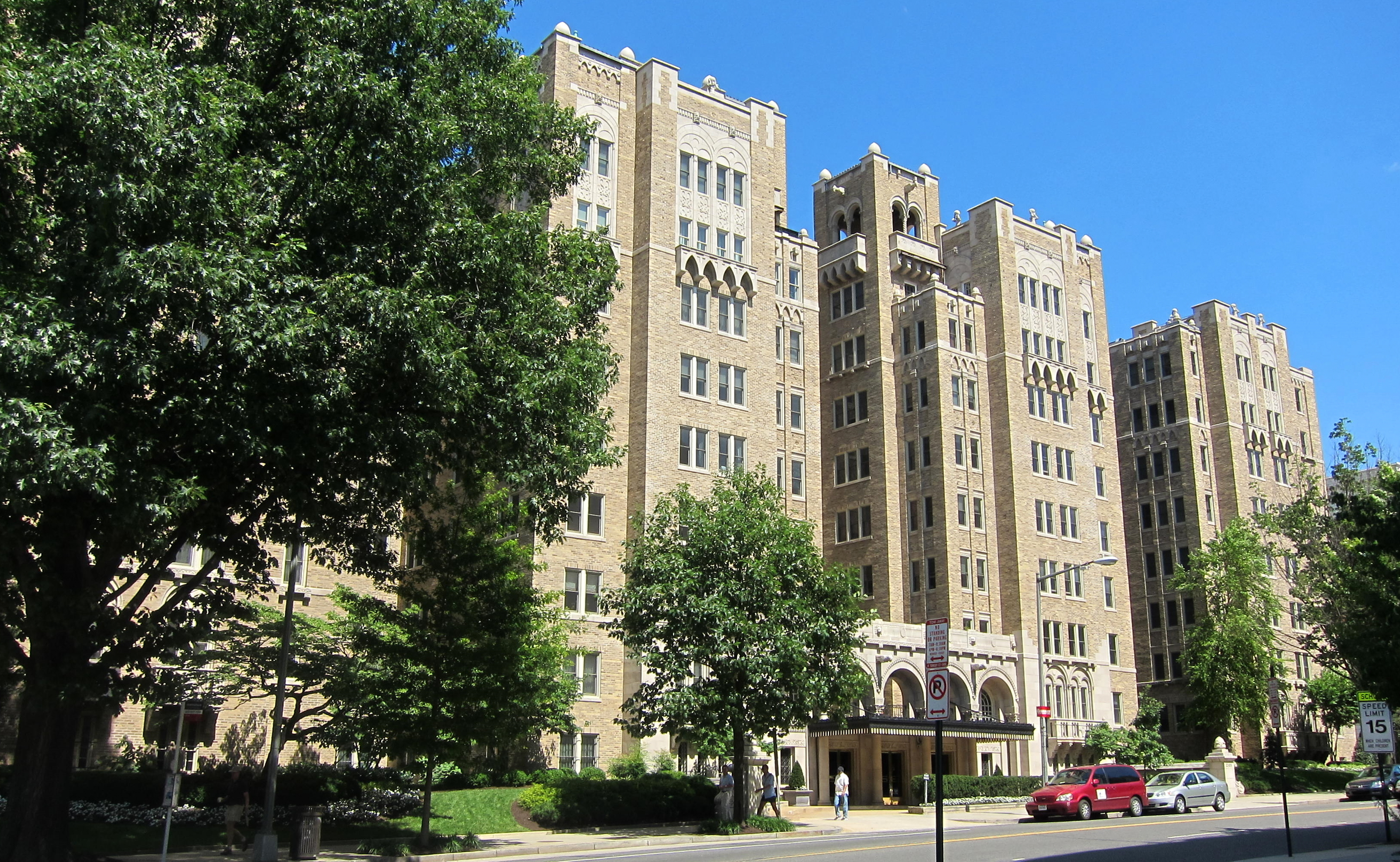
Burton's former residence in Washington, D.C.

In 1920, he returned to Ohio and was again elected to the House, this time from the 22nd District (borders having changed in 1912). He was re-elected to the House in 1922, 1924, and 1926.

During his later House service, he was appointed by President Harding to the World War Debt Funding Commission in 1922; and was chairman of the United States delegation to the conference for the control of international traffic in arms at Geneva, Switzerland, in 1925.

As president of the American Peace Society, Burton hosted the First World Conference on International Justice in Cleveland in 1928, attended by 13,000, including world leaders.

In 1928, he did not seek re-election to the House. Instead he won a special election to the Senate for the unfinished term of Frank B. Willis, who had died on March 30. He served in the Senate from December 15, 1928 until his death on October 28, 1929. Black Tuesday (the Wall Street crash of 1929) was on the following day, October 29, 1929.

== Personal life ==
From 1900 to 1912, Burton owned a country residence in Dover (now Westlake), Ohio, which had been built in 1838 by Thomas and Jane Hurst. The house was recorded in the Historic American Buildings Survey in 1936, and commemorated by an Ohio Historical Marker in 2002.

== See also ==
- List of members of the United States Congress who died in office (1900–1949)

U.S. House of Representatives
Preceded by Martin A. Foran	Member of the U.S. House of Representatives from Ohio's 21st congressional district 1889–1891	Succeeded by Tom L. Johnson
Preceded by Tom L. Johnson	Member of the U.S. House of Representatives from Ohio's 21st congressional district 1895–1909	Succeeded by James H. Cassidy
Preceded by Henry I. Emerson	Member of the U.S. House of Representatives from Ohio's 22nd congressional district 1921–1928	Succeeded by Chester C. Bolton
U.S. Senate
Preceded by Joseph B. Foraker	U.S. Senator (Class 3) from Ohio; 1909–1915; Served alongside: Charles W. F. Dick, Atlee Pomerene	Succeeded by Warren G. Harding
Preceded by Cyrus Locher	U.S. Senator (Class 3) from Ohio; 1928–1929; Served alongside: Simeon D. Fess	Succeeded by Roscoe C. McCulloch
Party political offices
Preceded by Frank B. Willis	Republican nominee for U.S. Senator from Ohio (Class 3); 1928	Succeeded by Roscoe C. McCulloch
Preceded by Henry Cabot Lodge	Keynote Speaker of the Republican National Convention; 1924	Succeeded by Simeon D. Fess
Awards and achievements
Preceded by Charles Horace Mayo	Cover of Time; 29 June 1925	Succeeded by Charlie Chaplin
