= William B. Bowling =

American politician

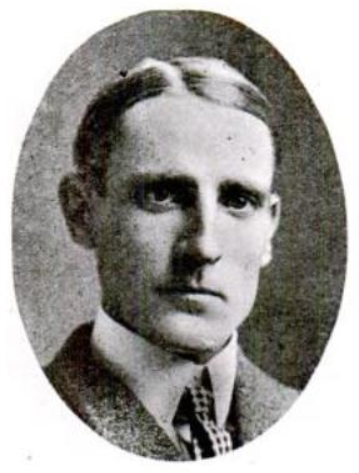

Member of the U.S. House of Representatives from Alabama's 5th district
- In office December 14, 1920 – August 16, 1928
- Preceded by: J. Thomas Heflin
- Succeeded by: LaFayette L. Patterson

Personal details
- Born: William Bismarck Bowling; September 24, 1870 Iron City, Alabama, U.S.
- Died: December 27, 1946 (aged 76) LaFayette, Alabama, U.S.
- Party: Democratic

William Bismarck Bowling (September 24, 1870 – December 27, 1946) was a U.S. representative from Alabama.

Born in Iron City, Calhoun County, Alabama to William and Sarah Elston Bowling, William Bismarck Bowling attended the common schools, and graduated from the State normal school, Jacksonville, Alabama, in 1892. He taught in the public schools of Montgomery, Alabama from 1893 to 1895 and of Columbus, Georgia from 1896 to 1899. He then moved to LaFayette, Alabama, where he studied law. He was admitted to the bar in 1900 and commenced practice in LaFayette. In 1902, he moved to Dadeville, Alabama and practiced there for twelve years. He served as solicitor of the fifth judicial circuit of Alabama 1905-1920, and as member of the board of trustees of Alabama Polytechnic Institute at Auburn.

Bowling was elected as a Democrat to the Sixty-sixth Congress to fill the vacancy caused by the resignation of J. Thomas Heflin. He was reelected to the Sixty-seventh and to the three succeeding Congresses and served from December 14, 1920, until his resignation effective August 16, 1928, having been appointed judge for the fifth judicial circuit of Alabama, in which capacity he served until his death.

He was married to the former Frances (Fannie) Steele Collins of Lafayette, Alabama. They had four children: George Randolph Bowling, Marion Elston Bowling Jenkins, Sarah Frances Bowling Frazer, and Elizabeth Jane Bowling; four grandchildren: George Randolph Bowling Jr., Susan Bowling Dudney, Jane Bowling Frazer McCurry, and William Bismarck Bowling II. Bowling died in LaFayette, Alabama, on December 27, 1946. He was interred in LaFayette Cemetery.

U.S. House of Representatives
Preceded by J. Thomas Heflin	Member of the U.S. House of Representatives from Alabama's 5th congressional district 1920-1928	Succeeded by LaFayette L. Patterson
