= Pearl P. Oldfield =

American politician (1876–1962)

Pearl Peden Oldfield
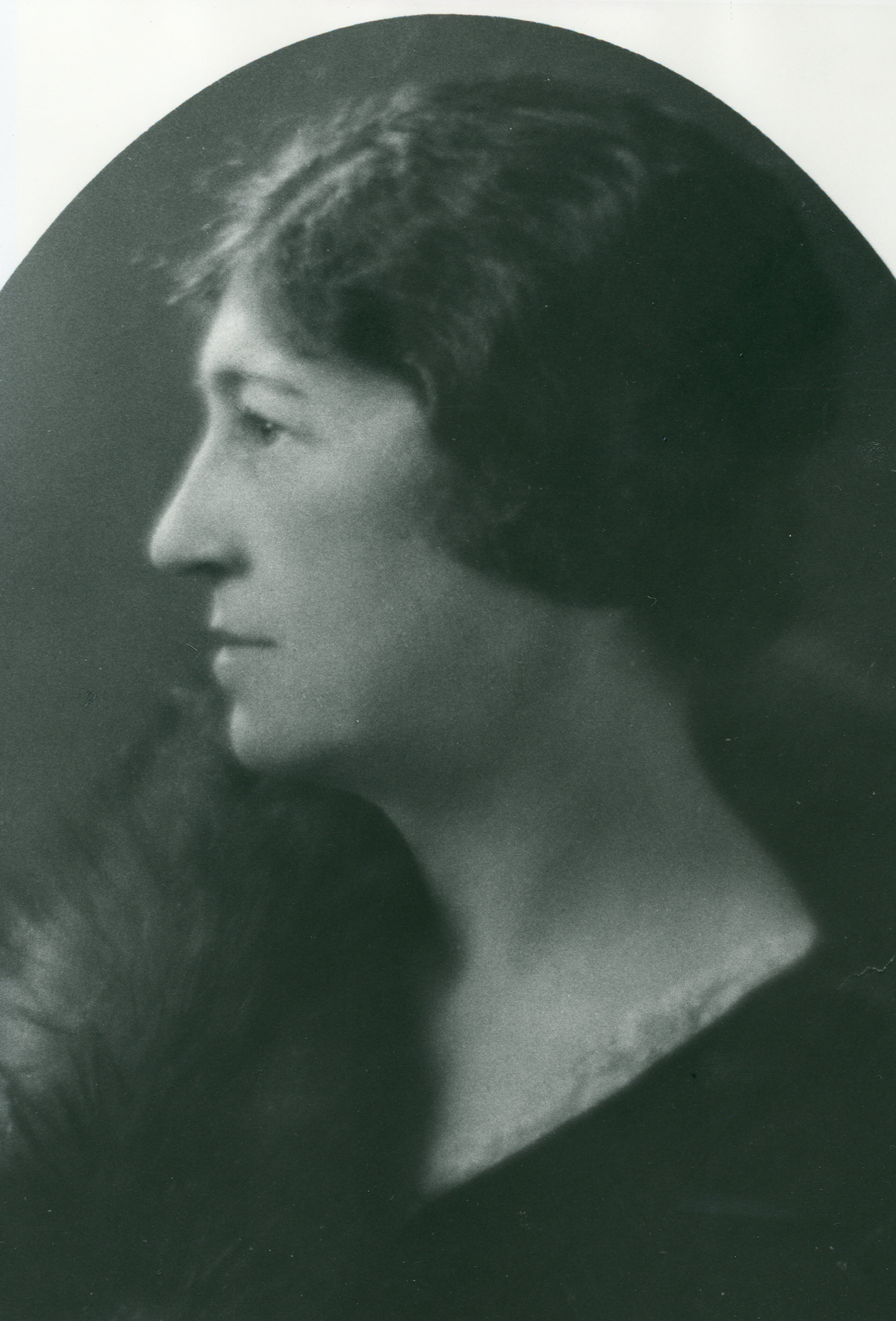

Member of the U.S. House of Representatives from Arkansas's 2nd district
- In office January 11, 1929 – March 4, 1931
- Preceded by: William Allan Oldfield
- Succeeded by: John E. Miller

Personal details
- Born: Fannie Pearl Peden; December 2, 1876 Cotton Plant, Arkansas, U.S.
- Died: April 12, 1962 (aged 85) Washington, D.C., U.S.
- Party: Democratic
- Spouse: William Allan Oldfield (m. 1901–1928)
- Education: Arkansas College

Fannie Pearl Oldfield (née Peden; December 2, 1876 – April 12, 1962) was an American Democratic politician and the United States representative from Arkansas's 2nd congressional district from 1929 to 1931. She was the first woman elected to Congress from Arkansas. In 1929, she replaced her husband, a congressman who died in office; Oldfield finished the last three months of his term and served one more before declining to run for re-election.

== Early life ==
Oldfield was born Fannie Pearl Peden in Cotton Plant, Arkansas to J. A. and Helen Hill Peden, who had five children. She went to Arkansas College in Batesville.

== Politics ==
In 1901, she married William Allan Oldfield. They had no children. William was first elected to the United States House of Representatives in 1908, winning 10 terms to the office during his life. Particularly in the final years of his career, Oldfield was greatly involved in his work, editing speeches and discussing matters before Congress.

He died on November 19, 1928, shortly after winning re-election to his seat in that year's elections. Oldfield was nominated to replace him without opposition by the Democratic Party and the Republicans did not field a candidate. She faced only one opponent, a man running as an independent, and she won the special election on January 9, 1929 and was sworn in on the 11th to finish her husband's term in the 70th United States Congress. She was the first woman elected to Congress from Arkansas and one of eight women in the House at the time.

In addition to the special election, she was elected to a full term in the 71st United States Congress on the same day, and served from until March 3, 1931 (she did not run for reelection in 1930). While in Congress, she was on three committees: Coinage, Weights and Measures; Expenditures in the Executive Departments; and Public Buildings and Grounds. One of her first actions in office was supporting funding for Prohibition policing in January 1929. She chiefly voted along party lines and focused on legislation affecting her Arkansas constituents. She gave her first floor speech in the House on January 12, 1930, supporting a food aid bill and calling for relief for those in need in Arkansas during the Great Depression. She also sponsored legislation to pay for the construction of bridges across the Black River and White River in her district.

In office, Oldfield wore black at all times. In 1930, the other Representative from Arkansas died and his widow Effiegene Locke Wingo also replaced him. It was the first time two women had represented the same state.

Though a feminist movement was fueling demands for women's access to political life—"There are thousands of women in the United States who would give half they own to be in Pearl Peden Oldfield's place" wrote one newspaper account—when leaving office rather than run for re-election, Oldfield said politics should be left to men. "There are so many other things a woman can do that a man can't," she told an interviewer. "Why not do them and let the men do what they can?" She also expressed frustration with the media questions put to her "solely because I am a woman and not because my opinion bears any weight." She repeatedly voiced the view that if women were going to enter the political sphere, it should only be because of merit rather than any special quality of their sex, and that in office they should not focus on "feminine" concerns.

== Later life ==
Oldfield's mother moved in with her in Washington, D.C., in 1914, and after leaving Congress Oldfield remained in Washington to care for her. After her mother's death in 1933, Oldfield lived in retirement in Washington, where she was involved in several civic and charitable organizations. She died in Washington on April 12, 1962.

== See also ==
- Women in the United States House of Representatives

U.S. House of Representatives
Preceded by William Allan Oldfield	Member of the U.S. House of Representatives from Arkansas's 2nd congressional district January 9, 1929 – March 4, 1931	Succeeded by John E. Miller
