= Cyrus Locher =

American politician

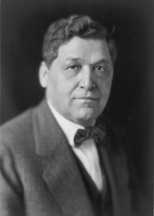

United States Senator from Ohio
- In office April 4, 1928 – December 14, 1928
- Appointed by: A. Victor Donahey
- Preceded by: Frank B. Willis
- Succeeded by: Theodore E. Burton

Personal details
- Born: March 8, 1878 Putnam County, Ohio, U.S.
- Died: August 17, 1929 (aged 51) Cleveland, Ohio, U.S.
- Party: Democratic
- Spouse: Beulah Louise Baker
- Education: Ohio Wesleyan University; Case Western Reserve University School of Law; University of Michigan

Cyrus Locher (March 8, 1878 – August 17, 1929) was a Democratic politician from Ohio. He served in the U.S. Senate in 1928.

He graduated from high school at Pandora, Ohio, and from Ohio Wesleyan University in 1903, when he gave the commencement oration. He was later that year named superintendent of schools at Woodsfield, Ohio. He graduated from the Case Western Reserve University School of Law. He also studied briefly at the University of Michigan.

Locher served in various capacities as a prosecutor and public solicitor, as well as law professor in Cleveland, Ohio during the 1910s and 1920s. He was appointed to the U.S. Senate on April 4, 1928 upon the death of Senator Frank B. Willis. Locher served until December 14, 1928, having lost a bid for the nomination in a special election to fill the remainder of Willis's term.

Locher was admitted to St. Luke's Hospital in Cleveland, where he underwent an operation for gallstones on August 11, 1929. He suffered complications following the operation, and received three blood transfusions in the following days. He died at the hospital at 4:45 a.m. on August 17, several hours after the third transfusion.

He met his wife, Beulah Louise Baker, when he was traveling through Bloomington, Illinois with an Ohio Wesleyan University choral group. They married in 1907.

His nephew, Ralph S. Locher, would serve as both the mayor of Cleveland, Ohio from 1962–67, and as an Ohio Supreme Court Justice for two terms between 1977-89.

U.S. Senate
Preceded by Frank B. Willis	United States Senator (Class 3) from Ohio; 1928	Succeeded by Theodore E. Burton
