= Charles L. Faust =

American politician (1879–1928)

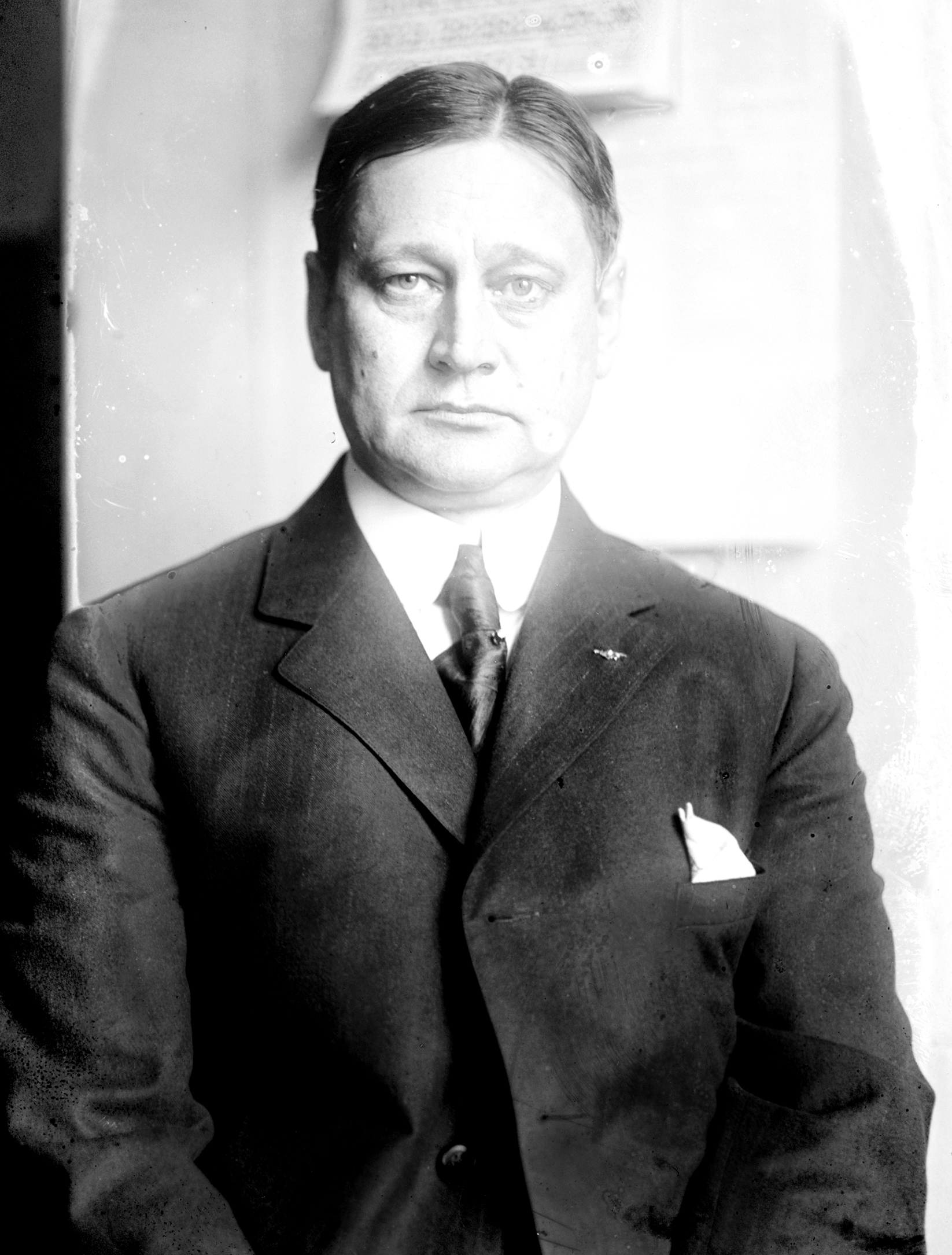

Member of the U.S. House of Representatives from Missouri's 4th district
- In office March 4, 1921 – December 17, 1928
- Preceded by: Charles F. Booher
- Succeeded by: David W. Hopkins

Personal details
- Born: Charles Lee Faust; April 24, 1879 near Bellefontaine, Ohio, U.S.
- Died: December 17, 1928 (aged 49) Washington, D.C., U.S.
- Resting place: Highland Cemetery, Highland, Kansas, U.S.
- Party: Republican
- Education: Highland University; University of Kansas School of Law
- Profession: Politician, lawyer

Charles Lee Faust (April 24, 1879 – December 17, 1928) was a U.S. representative from Missouri.

Born near Bellefontaine, Ohio, Faust moved with his parents to a farm near Highland, Kansas. He attended the public schools and Highland University. He engaged in teaching in a country school near Highland in 1898–1900. He graduated from the law department of the University of Kansas at Lawrence in 1903, was admitted to the bar the same year, and commenced the practice of his profession in St. Joseph, Missouri. City counselor of St. Joseph in 1915–1919.

Faust was elected as a Republican to the Sixty-seventh and to the three succeeding Congresses and served from March 4, 1921, until his death. He served as chairman of the Committee on the Census (Sixty-eighth Congress). Had been reelected to the Seventy-first Congress. He died December 17, 1928, at the United States Naval Hospital, Washington, D.C. He was interred in Highland Cemetery, Highland, Kansas.

== See also ==
- List of members of the United States Congress who died in office (1900–1949)

U.S. House of Representatives
Preceded by Charles F. Booher	Member of the U.S. House of Representatives from Missouri's 4th congressional district 1921–1928	Succeeded by David W. Hopkins
