= David W. Hopkins =

American politician

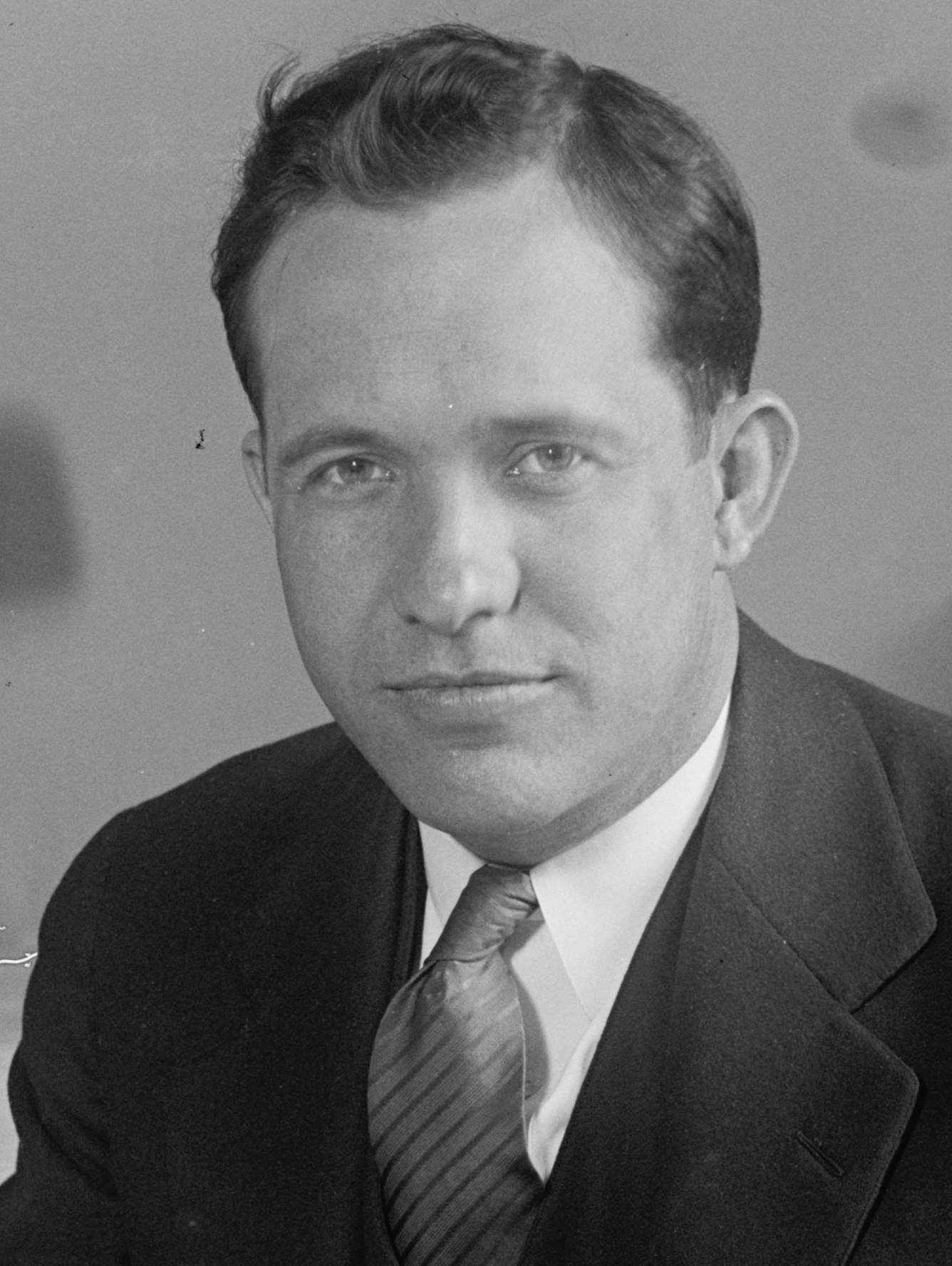

Member of the U.S. House of Representatives from Missouri's 4th district
- In office February 5, 1929 – March 3, 1933
- Preceded by: Charles L. Faust
- Succeeded by: None (District dissolved)

Personal details
- Born: October 31, 1897 Troy, Kansas, U.S.
- Died: October 14, 1968 (aged 70) St. Joseph, Missouri, U.S.
- Party: Republican

David William Hopkins (October 31, 1897 – October 14, 1968) was a Republican U.S. Representative from Missouri; born in Troy, Doniphan County, Kansas.

Hopkins moved with his parents to Saint Joseph, Missouri in 1899. He graduated from Graceland Academy, Lamoni, Iowa in 1916. In 1920 he graduated from University of Iowa in Iowa City, Iowa where he was a member of Sigma Pi fraternity. He graduated from the University of Missouri in Columbia, Missouri in 1926. He then taught in the high schools of St. Joseph from 1922 until elected to Congress in 1928. He also served as superintendent of schools of St. Joseph in 1928 and 1929 and the St. Joseph Board of Education from 1937 to 1967. He was defeated in the election of 1932 and returned to private life as an insurance broker.

U.S. House of Representatives
Preceded by Charles L. Faust	Member of the U.S. House of Representatives from Missouri's 4th congressional district 1929–1933	Succeeded by None (District dissolved)
