= Frank B. Willis =

American politician (1871-1928)

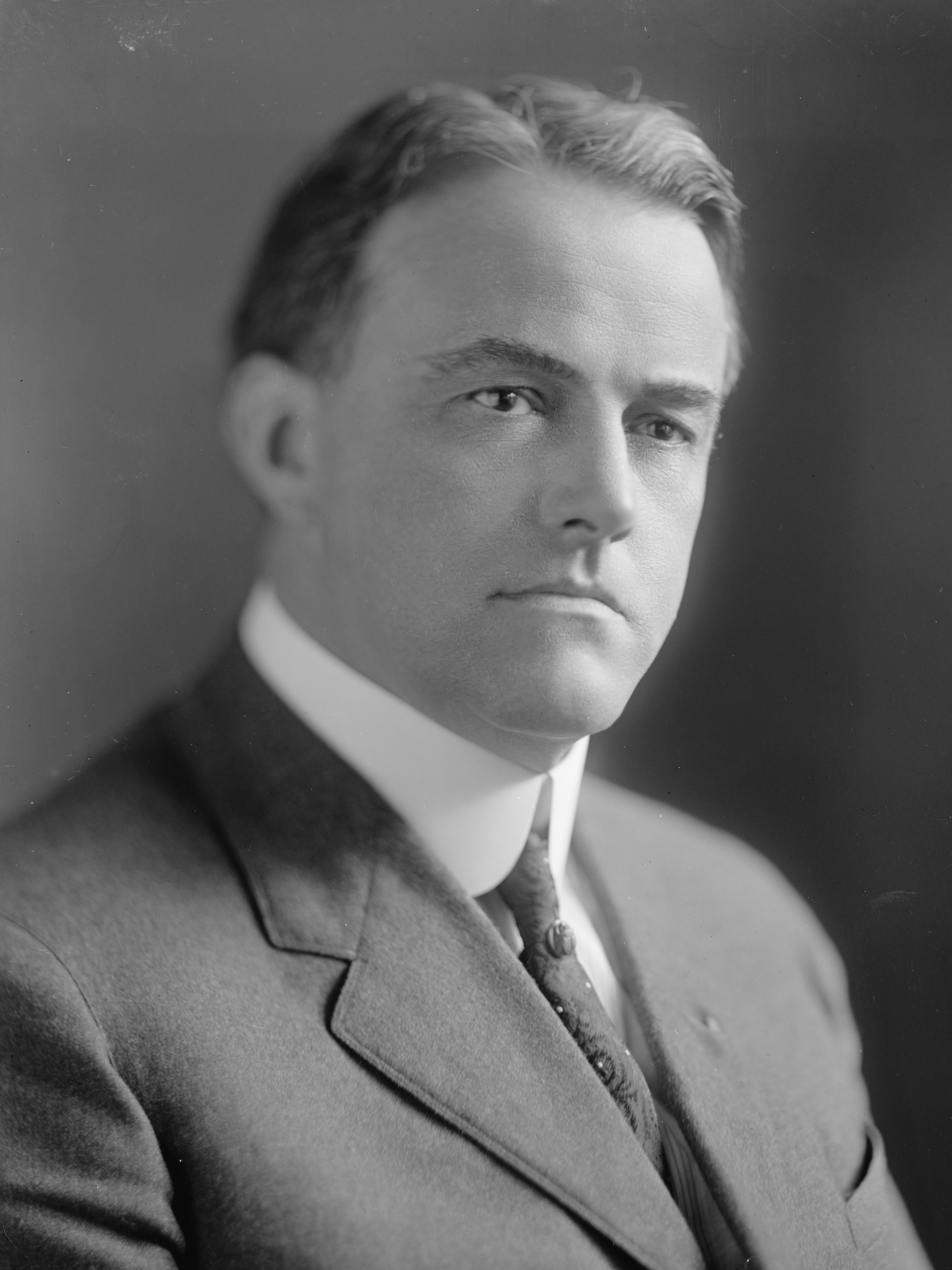
- Willis, 1921–1928

47th Governor of Ohio
- In office January 11, 1915 – January 8, 1917
- Lieutenant: John Holmes Arnold
- Preceded by: James M. Cox
- Succeeded by: James M. Cox

United States Senator from Ohio
- In office January 14, 1921 – March 30, 1928
- Preceded by: Warren G. Harding
- Succeeded by: Cyrus Locher

Member of the U.S. House of Representatives from Ohio's 8th district
- In office March 4, 1911 – January 9, 1915
- Preceded by: Ralph D. Cole
- Succeeded by: John A. Key

Member of the Ohio House of Representatives from the Hardin County district
- In office January 1, 1900 – January 3, 1905
- Preceded by: N. R. Piper
- Succeeded by: J. B. Pumphrey

Personal details
- Born: Frank Bartlett Willis; December 28, 1871 Lewis Center, Ohio, U.S.
- Died: March 30, 1928 (aged 56) Delaware, Ohio, U.S.
- Resting place: Oak Grove Cemetery, Delaware, Ohio
- Party: Republican
- Spouse: Allie Dustin
- Children: 1
- Education: Ohio Northern University (BA)

Frank Bartlett Willis (December 28, 1871 – March 30, 1928) was an American politician and lawyer. He was a Republican from Ohio. He served as the 47th governor of Ohio from 1915 to 1917, then served as a U.S. senator from Ohio from 1921 until his death in 1928.

== Biography ==
Born on a farm near the hamlet of Lewis Center, Ohio, Willis was the son of a Civil War veteran, Vermont-born J.B. Willis and his wife Lavinia A. (Buell). Willis graduated from Ohio Northern University in 1894. After teaching at Ohio Northern for twelve years, Willis was admitted to the bar and began practicing law. He served in the Ohio House of Representatives from 1900 to 1904 while teaching at Ohio Northern school of law, and was subsequently elected to the U.S. House of Representatives in 1910, serving from 1911 to 1915. Elected to the governorship in 1914, he served one two-year term from 1915 to 1917, but was not re-elected, being defeated by James M. Cox, whom he had defeated in 1914. Cox also defeated Willis in 1918.

After placing Warren G. Harding's name in nomination at the 1920 Republican National Convention, Willis was elected to the U.S. Senate in 1920, replacing Harding, who then resigned his Senate seat to take the presidency, allowing Willis to take his seat early. During his Senate tenure, Willis served as Chairman of the Senate Committee on Territories and Insular Possessions, which had jurisdiction over territories including Alaska, Hawaii, the Philippines, and Puerto Rico, from 1923 to 1928.

Willis wanted to be Ohio's favorite son candidate for the presidency in 1928. He died in office that year at Gray Chapel, Ohio Wesleyan University, in Delaware, Ohio, during a Republican Party event for his candidacy organized by the Delaware County Willis-for-President Club. He was buried at Oak Grove Cemetery.

== Legacy ==
Willis's official papers were donated to and are open for research at the Ohio History Center.

Frank B. Willis Education Center (formerly Intermediate School and High School) of Delaware City Schools is named in his honor.

Willis was married to Allie Dustin, and they had one daughter named Helen.

== See also ==
- List of members of the United States Congress who died in office (1900–1949)

U.S. House of Representatives
Preceded by Ralph D. Cole	Member of the U.S. House of Representatives from Ohio's 8th congressional district 1911–1915	Succeeded by John A. Key
Political offices
Preceded by James M. Cox	Governor of Ohio; 1915–1917	Succeeded by James M. Cox
U.S. Senate
Preceded by Warren G. Harding	United States Senator (Class 3) from Ohio; 1921–1928	Succeeded by Cyrus Locher
Party political offices
Preceded by Robert B. Brown	Republican Party nominee for Governor of Ohio; 1914, 1916, 1918	Succeeded by Harry L. Davis
Preceded by Warren G. Harding	Republican nominee for U.S. Senator from Ohio (Class 3); 1920, 1926	Succeeded by Theodore E. Burton
