= 1803 New York's 7th congressional district special election =

A special election was held in New York's 7th congressional district April 26–28, 1803 to fill a vacancy caused by the resignation of Representative-elect John Cantine (DR)

== Election results ==
Candidate	Party	Votes	Percent
Josiah Hasbrouck	Democratic-Republican	1,810	53.3%
Conrad E. Elmendorf	Federalist	1,589	46.7%

Hasbrouck took office with the rest of the 8th Congress at the start of the 1st Session.

== See also ==
- List of special elections to the United States House of Representatives
