= 1794 Maryland's 3rd congressional district special election =

A special election was held in Maryland's 3rd congressional district on December 8, 1794, to fill a vacancy left by the resignation of Uriah Forrest (P) on November 8 of the same year.

== Election results ==
Candidate	Party	Votes	Percent
Benjamin Edwards	Pro-Administration	364	54.4%
Thomas Turner	Unknown	281	42.0%
Richard Hall	Unknown	24	3.6%

Edwards took his seat in the 3rd Congress on January 2, 1795.

== See also ==
- List of special elections to the United States House of Representatives
