= 1836 Pennsylvania's 13th congressional district special election =

On November 4, 1836, a special election was held in Pennsylvania's 13th congressional district to fill a vacancy left by the October 30th, 1836 resignation of Jesse Miller (J).

== Election results ==
Candidate	Party	Votes	Percent
James Black	Jacksonian	3,579	57.5%
Robert Elliott	Anti-Jacksonian	2,742	42.5%

Black took his seat December 5, 1836, at the start of the 2nd session of the 24th Congress.

== See also ==
- List of special elections to the United States House of Representatives
