= 1813 Ohio's 3rd congressional district special election =

A special election was held in Ohio's 3rd congressional district on May 10, 1813, to fill a vacancy left by the resignation of Duncan McArthur (DR) on April 5, 1813, before Congress assembled.

== Election results ==
| Candidate | Party | Votes | Percent |
|---|---|---|---|
| William Creighton, Jr. | Democratic-Republican | 538 | 59.8% |
| Abraham Claypool | | 361 | 40.2% |

Creighton took his seat June 15, 1813

== See also ==
- List of special elections to the United States House of Representatives
