= 1839 Pennsylvania's 14th congressional district special election =

On November 20, 1839, a special election was held in Pennsylvania's 14th congressional district to fill a vacancy caused by the death of William W. Potter (D) on October 28 of that year, before the start of the first session of the 26th Congress.

== Election results ==
Candidate	Party	Votes	Percent
George McCulloch	Democratic	4,094	50.9%
James Irvin	Whig	3,956	49.1%

McCulloch took his seat on December 2, 1839, at the start of the 1st session of the 26th Congress.

== See also ==
- List of special elections to the United States House of Representatives
