= 1806 Pennsylvania's 1st congressional district special election =

By-election in Pennsylvania's first congressional district

A special election was held in Pennsylvania's 1st congressional district on November 27, 1806, to fill a vacancy left by the resignation of Michael Leib (DR) on February 14, 1806.

== Election results ==
Candidate	Party	Votes	Percent
John Porter	Democratic-Republican	2,396	73.1%
Richard Falwell	Federalist	829	25.3%
Jonas Preston	Federalist	53	1.6%

Porter took his seat December 8, 1806

== See also ==
- List of special elections to the United States House of Representatives
