= 1803 New York's 6th congressional district special election =

A special election was held in New York's 6th congressional district September 14–16, 1803 to fill a vacancy left by the death of Isaac Bloom (DR) on April 26, 1803, after the start of the 8th Congress, but before the first session began.

== Election results ==
Candidate	Party	Votes	Percent
Daniel C. Verplanck	Democratic-Republican	809	57.4%
Benjamin Akin	Federalist	601	43.6%

== See also ==
- List of special elections to the United States House of Representatives
