= 1826 Pennsylvania's 2nd congressional district special election =

At some point in 1826, Joseph Hemphill (J) of Pennsylvania's 2nd district resigned from Congress. A special election was held to fill the resulting vacancy.

== Election results ==
| Candidate | Party | Votes | Percent |
|---|---|---|---|
| Thomas Kittera | Anti-Jacksonian | 2,399 | 55.0% |
| Henry Horn | Jacksonian | 1,961 | 45.0% |

Kittera took his seat at the start of the Second Session of Congress.

== See also ==
- List of special elections to the United States House of Representatives
