= 1793 Maryland's 2nd congressional district special election =

A special election was held in Maryland's 2nd congressional district on January 7, 1793, to fill a vacancy left by the resignation of Joshua Seney (A) on December 6, 1792, to accept a judicial appointment.

== Election results ==
Candidate	Party	Votes	Percent
William Hindman	Pro-Administration	355	63.5%
Thomas Whattington	Unknown	204	36.5%

Hindman took his seat on January 30, 1793.

== See also ==
- List of special elections to the United States House of Representatives
