= 1841 Pennsylvania's 13th congressional district special election =

On May 4, 1841, a special election was held in Pennsylvania's 13th congressional district to fill a vacancy caused by the death of William S. Ramsey (D) on October 17, 1840, shortly after his re-election, and before the 26th Congress had ended.

== Election results ==
| Candidate | Party | Votes | Percent |
|---|---|---|---|
| Amos Gustine | Democratic | 1,820 | 93.9% |
| Scattering | | 119 | 6.1% |

Gustine took his seat on May 31, at the start of the 1st session of the 27th Congress.

== See also ==
- List of special elections to the United States House of Representatives
- United States House of Representatives elections, 1840
