= 1812 New York's 6th congressional district special election =

A special election was held in New York's 6th congressional district December 15–17, 1812 to fill a vacancy left by the resignation of Robert Le Roy Livingston (F) on May 6, 1812

== Election returns ==
Candidate	Party	Votes	Percent
Thomas P. Grosvenor	Federalist	6,298	100%

There was no opposition to Grosvenor. Grosvenor took his seat on January 29, 1813.

== See also ==
- List of special elections to the United States House of Representatives
