= 1840 Pennsylvania's 13th congressional district special election =

On November 20, 1840, a special election was held in Pennsylvania's 13th congressional district to fill a vacancy caused by the death of William S. Ramsey on October 17 of the same year.

== Election results ==
Candidate	Party	Votes	Percent
Charles McClure	Democratic	3,452	94.7%
Scattering		195	5.3%

McClure took office on December 7, 1840, at the start of the 2nd session of the 26th Congress.

== See also ==
- List of special elections to the United States House of Representatives
