= List of people from Kingston, New York =

The people listed below were all born in, residents of, or otherwise closely associated with the city of Kingston, New York.

== Notable people ==
=== Actors, musicians and others in the entertainment industry ===
- Margarethe Bence (1930–1992), opera singer
- Peter Bogdanovich (1939–2022), film director, writer and actor; born in Kingston
- Tyler Bryant (b. 1992), singer, rapper, Grammy-nominated producer
- Larry Cohen (1941–2019), film producer, director, and screenwriter; born in Kingston
- Robert Craft (1923–2015), conductor and writer who worked with and had a lifelong friendship with composer Igor Stravinsky, recording a number of his works; born in the city
- Jack DeJohnette (1942–2025), jazz drummer, pianist and composer
- Luann de Lesseps, former countess, star of Real Housewives of New York City, purchased a home along the Hudson River in 2018 which has been featured on the show
- Josh Eppard (b. 1979), drummer for progressive rock band Coheed and Cambria; born in Kingston
- John Glover (b. 1944), actor, born in Kingston
- Tom Hart (b. 1969), comics creator, born in Kingston
- Robert Hutton (1920–1994), film actor; born and died in Kingston
- Paul Austin Kelly (b. 1960), opera tenor, jazz singer, children's music performer and impresario
- Joseph Kesselring (1902–1967), writer and playwright best known for his play Arsenic and Old Lace, died in Kingston
- Paul Kreppel (b. 1947), television and Broadway theatre director and actor; born in Kingston
- Pauline Oliveros, composer, performer, humanitarian, pioneer in American music
- Henry Paul (b. 1949), southern rock and country singer-songwriter; born in Kingston
- Anne Sweeney (b. 1957), co-chair of Disney Media and president of the Disney–ABC Television Group; named the "Most Powerful Woman in Entertainment" by The Hollywood Reporter, one of the "50 Most Powerful Women in Business" by Fortune magazine, and one of "The World's 100 Most Powerful Women" by Forbes; spent her childhood in Kingston and is a graduate of Coleman High School
- Jane Ball (1920–2005), actress, born in Kingston
- Andrea True (1943–2011), pornographic actress and singer, died in Kingston

=== Politics, political activism, government service ===
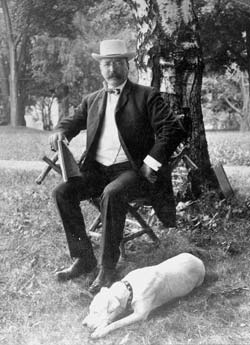
Alton B. Parker, 1904 Democratic nominee for president

- George Clinton (1739–1812), fourth vice president of the United States and first elected governor of New York State, buried in the city at the Old Dutch Church
- Johanna Contreras, acting executive of Ulster County
- Charles DeWitt (1727–1789), miller and statesman from Kingston, served as a delegate to the Continental Congress
- Arthur Sherwood Flemming (1905–1996), United States Secretary of Health and Human Services
- Josh Green (born 1970), governor of Hawaii
- Abraham B. Hasbrouck (1791–1879), U.S. congressman and the sixth president of Rutgers College (now Rutgers University), born and died in Kingston
- Robert W. Hasbrouck, U.S. Army major general
- Alton B. Parker (1852–1926), Democratic presidential nominee in 1904; practiced law in the city; the first president of the Ulster County Bar Association; president of Ulster County Savings Institution
- Pat Ryan (born 1982), U.S. representative for New York
- Henry Granville Sharpe (1858–1947), 24th quartermaster general
- Nicholas Sickles (1801–1845), U.S. congressman
- Daniel Tompkins Van Buren, son of John Van Buren, American Civil War veteran who attained the rank of brigadier general by brevet in the Union Army
- John Van Buren (1799–1855), U.S. congressman

=== Others ===
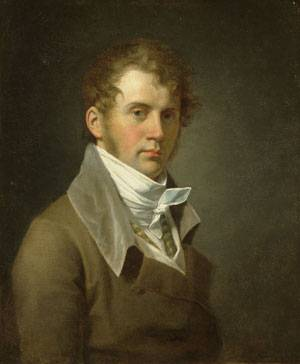
Self-portrait, John Vanderlyn, 1800

- Joe Ausanio (b. 1965), pitcher for the New York Yankees during the 1990s; born and grew up in Kingston; half-brother of Major Leaguer Paul Runge
- Bud Culloton (1896–1976), pitcher for the Pittsburgh Pirates
- Heywood Hale Broun (1918–2001), sportswriter and commentator, died in the city, had family in nearby Woodstock
- Gerald Celente (b. 1946), publisher of Trends Journal
- Alphonso T. Clearwater (1848–1933), lawyer, district attorney, county judge, Justice of the New York Supreme Court
- Billy Costello (1956–2011), former WBC junior welterweight champion
- Robert H. Dietz (1921–1945), United States Army soldier and Medal of Honor recipient in World War II; Kingston's Dietz Stadium (football and soccer) is named for him
- Dave Ferraro (b. 1959), PBA bowler
- Mike Ferraro (1944−2024), third baseman for the New York Yankees and Milwaukee Brewers; later coach for the Kansas City Royals; born in Kingston
- Ezra Fitch (1866–1930), the "Fitch" in Abercrombie & Fitch, practiced law in Kingston before leaving to join Abercrombie in his wilderness outfitting store in New York City in 1900; bought out Abercrombie in 1907
- Charles Lang Freer (1854–1919), donated his art collection to the Smithsonian Institution; born in Kingston; namesake of the Freer Gallery of Art, part of the Smithsonian
- Walter B. Gibson (1897–1985), author and professional magician, known for his pulp-fiction character The Shadow
- Tom Hallion (b. 1956), Major League Baseball umpire
- Dior Johnson (b. 2004), basketball player for the UCF knights
- Brian Kenny (b. 1963), journalist; anchor of Friday Night Fights and ESPNEWS' The Hot List; previously worked for WTZA in the city
- Edgar F. Luckenbach (1868–1943), shipping magnate, Luckenbach Steamship Company
- James Mahoney (1925–2002), auxiliary bishop of the Archdiocese of New York
- Jervis McEntee (1828–1891), painter of the Hudson River School; buried in Montrepose Cemetery in the city
- Evaline Ness (1911–1986), illustrator and author; won a Caldecott Medal in 1967 for Sam, Bangs, and Moonshine; was married to "Untouchable" Eliot Ness, 1938–1946; died in the city
- Maud Petersham (1890–1971), won the Caldecott Medal with her husband and co-author Miska Petrezselyem Mikaly in 1946 for The Rooster Crows; born in Kingston
- Justin Robinson (b. 1995), professional basketball player; graduate of Monmouth University
- Andrée Ruellan (1905–2006), painter whose works are in the permanent collections of the Metropolitan Museum of Art and the Whitney Museum; died in the city
- Paul Runge Jr., (b. 1958), infielder for the Atlanta Braves during the 1980s; manager of several minor league teams; born and grew up in Kingston; half-brother of major leaguer Joe Ausanio
- Zack Short (b. 1995), MLB player
- Clarence W. Spangenberger (1905–2008), businessman and former president of Cornell Steamboat Company
- Ron Suskind (b. 1959), journalist and writer
- John Vanderlyn (1776–1852), neoclassicist painter; born in Kingston
- Calvert Vaux (1824–1895), architect and landscape designer; co-designer of Central Park, NYC; buried in Kingston's Montrepose Cemetery
- Kate Youngman (1841–1910), Christian missionary to Japan, established the Ihaien leprosy hospital in Tokyo, Japan
