= 1931 United States House of Representatives elections =

1931 U.S. House of Representatives elections
- May 12, 1931 – December 1, 1931

11 (out of 435) seats in the U.S. House of Representatives 218 seats needed for a majority
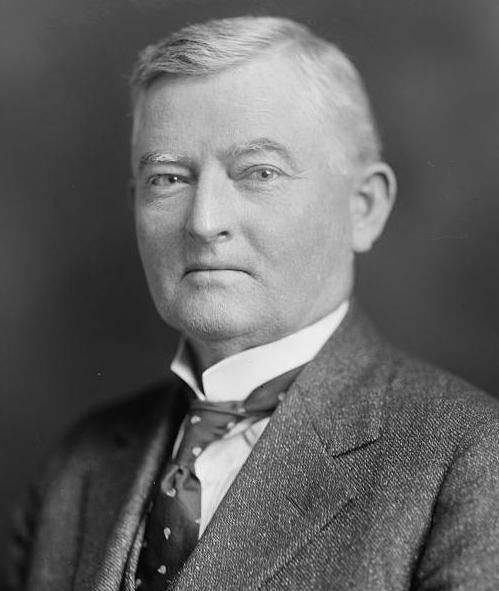

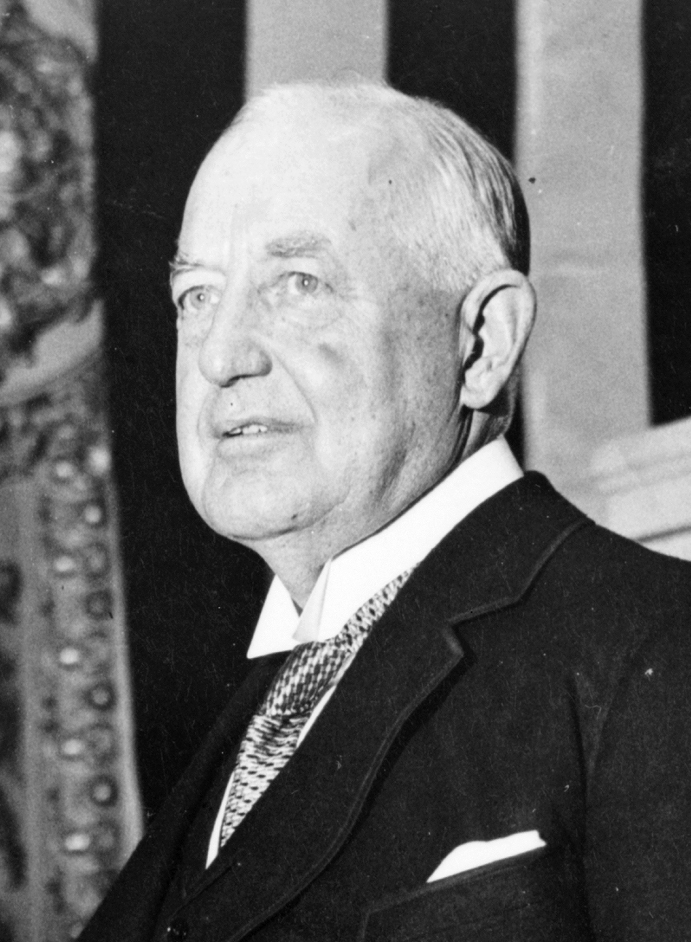
	Majority party	Minority party
Leader	John Nance Garner	Bertrand Snell
Party	Democratic	Republican
Leader since	March 4, 1929	March 4, 1931
Leader's seat	Texas 15th	New York 31st
Last election	216 seats	218 seats (Note: Fletcher Hale (R) of New Hampshire's 1st congressional district died October 22, 1931, but the special election was held January 5, 1932.)
Seats won	219	216
Seat change	▲3	▼2
Seats up	5	5
Races won	8	3
	Third party
Party	Farmer–Labor
Last election	1 seat
Seats won	1
Seat change	Steady
Seats up	0
Races won	0

There were special elections to the United States House of Representatives in 1931 to the 71st United States Congress and 72nd United States Congress. After the 1930 House elections, the Republicans held a narrow majority of 218 seats, the smallest possible majority in congress. However, following these elections, the Democrats gained 3 seats resulting in a Democratic House majority. This Democratic majority was only further increased in the 1932 house elections and would survive for 63 years, with the Republicans only briefly holding the House following the 1946 and 1952 House elections. Republicans would only hold House control for a significant amount of time following the Republican Revolution of 1994.

== 71st Congress ==
Elections are listed by date and district.

District	Incumbent			This race	
District	Member	Party	First elected	Results	Candidates
New York 9	David J. O'Connell	Democratic	1918; 1920 (lost); 1922	Incumbent died December 29, 1930. New member elected February 17, 1931. Democratic hold.	▌ ✓ Stephen A. Rudd (Democratic) 71.53%; ▌William Koch (Republican) 26.13%; ▌James Oneal (Socialist) 2.34%

== 72nd Congress ==
Elections are listed by date and district.

District	Incumbent			This race	
District	Member	Party	First elected	Results	Candidates
New York 7	John Quayle	Democratic	1922	Incumbent died November 27, 1930. New member elected February 17, 1931. Democratic hold.	▌ ✓ Matthew V. O'Malley (Democratic) 69.97%; ▌Leonard Greenstone (Republican) 28.17%; ▌David Munroe Cory (Socialist) 1.85%
Louisiana 8	James B. Aswell	Democratic	1912	Incumbent died March 16, 1931. New member elected May 12, 1931. Democratic hold.	▌ ✓ John H. Overton (Democratic); Unopposed
Georgia 1	Charles G. Edwards	Democratic	1906; 1916 (retired); 1924	Incumbent died July 13, 1931. New member elected September 9, 1931. Democratic hold.	▌ ✓ Homer C. Parker (Democratic); Unopposed
Missouri 7	Samuel C. Major	Democratic	1918; 1920 (lost); 1922	Incumbent died July 28, 1931. New member elected September 29, 1931. Democratic hold.	▌ ✓ Robert D. Johnson (Democratic) 55.37%; ▌John W. Palmer (Republican) 36.86%; ▌L. L. Collins (Independent) 7.77%
Wisconsin 1	Vacant			Incumbent member-elect Henry A. Cooper (R) died March 1, 1931, in the previous congress. New member elected October 13, 1931. Republican hold.	▌ ✓ Thomas R. Amlie (Republican) 54.38%; ▌Otis J. Bouma (Socialist) 27.41%; ▌G. H. Herzog (Ind. Democratic) 12.95%; ▌Henry H. Tubbs (Prohibition) 3.44%; ▌John Sikat (Ind. Communist) 1.83%
Michigan 8	Bird J. Vincent	Republican	1922	Incumbent died July 18, 1931. New member elected November 3, 1931. Democratic gain.	▌ ✓ Michael J. Hart (Democratic) 55.23%; ▌Foss O. Eldred (Republican) 44.15%; ▌John G. Zittel (Workers) 0.63%
New York 7	Matthew V. O'Malley	Democratic	1931 (did not take office)	Representative-elect died May 26, 1931. New member elected November 3, 1931. Democratic hold.	▌ ✓ John J. Delaney (Democratic) 69.30%; ▌William L. Padgett (Republican) 22.10%; ▌Abraham Zucker (Socialist) 7.68%; ▌J. Louis Engdahl (Communist) 0.93%
Ohio 1	Nicholas Longworth	Republican	1902; 1912 (lost); 1914	Incumbent died April 9, 1931. New member elected November 3, 1931. Republican hold.	▌ ✓ John B. Hollister (Republican) 60.22%; ▌David Lorbach (Democratic) 37.13%; ▌Robert A. Duderstadt (Independent) 2.66%
Ohio 20	Charles A. Mooney	Democratic	1918; 1920 (lost); 1922	Incumbent died May 29, 1931. New member elected November 3, 1931. Democratic hold.	▌ ✓ Martin L. Sweeney (Democratic) 70.6%; ▌D. Hayden Perry (Republican) 29.4%
Pennsylvania 2	George S. Graham	Republican	1912	Incumbent died July 4, 1931. New member elected November 3, 1931. Republican hold.	▌ ✓ Edward L. Stokes (Republican) 94.97%; ▌Charles S. Hill (Democratic) 5.03%
Texas 14	Harry M. Wurzbach	Republican	1920; 1928 (lost); 1930 (won challenge)	Incumbent died November 6, 1931. New member elected November 24, 1931. Democratic gain.	▌ ✓ Richard M. Kleberg (Democratic) 47.06%; ▌Carl W. Johnson (Democratic) 34.47%; ▌Charles W. Anderson (Republican) 14.23%; ▌Tom B. Smiley (Republican) 4.24%
New Jersey 5	Ernest R. Ackerman	Republican	1918	Incumbent died October 18, 1931. New member elected December 1, 1931. Democratic gain.	▌ ✓ Percy H. Stewart (Democratic) 49.20%; ▌Donald H. McLean (Republican) 46.37%; ▌Alexis L. Clark (Prohibition) 3.95%; ▌Harry F. Kopp (Socialist) 0.30%; ▌Morris Langer (Communist) 0.18%
