= Michael J. Hogan =

American politician (1871–1940)

Michael Hogan
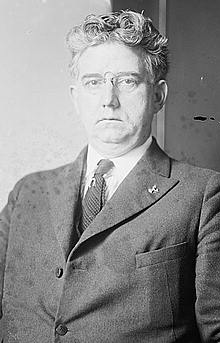

Member of the U.S. House of Representatives from New York's 7th district
- In office March 4, 1921 – March 3, 1923
- Preceded by: James P. Maher
- Succeeded by: John Quayle

Member of the New York City Board of Aldermen
- In office 1914–1920
- Preceded by: Robert Downing
- Succeeded by: Arthur Gorman

Personal details
- Born: Michael Joseph Hogan; April 22, 1871 New York City, U.S.
- Died: May 7, 1940 (aged 69) Rockville Centre, New York, U.S.
- Resting place: Green-Wood Cemetery
- Party: Republican
- Spouse: Anna Brittan (1906–1940)
- Children: 2

Michael Joseph Hogan (April 22, 1871 – May 7, 1940) was an American businessman and politician from Brooklyn, New York. A Republican, he was most notable for his service on New York City's board of aldermen and as a U.S. representative from New York.

== Biography ==
Born in New York City, Hogan attended both parochial and public schools, after which he worked in the freight forwarding and trucking industry.

He served as a member of the 13th Regiment, New York National Guard from 1889 to 1898 and advanced through the ranks from private to sergeant. From 1914 to 1920 he served on the New York City Board of Aldermen. He served as delegate to the Republican state conventions in 1914, 1918, 1920, 1922, 1924, and 1926.

He was elected as a Republican to the Sixty-seventh Congress (March 4, 1921 – March 3, 1923). He was an unsuccessful candidate for reelection in 1922 to the Sixty-eighth Congress.

Hogan was appointed secretary to the Collector of the Port of New York. In 1934, he was arrested and accused of attempting to extort bribes in exchange for aid in obtaining master plumbers' licenses for unqualified individuals. In 1937, Hogan testified for the state in the trial of the accused murderers of Samuel Drukman, and as a result he received a suspended sentence for his role in the license scandal. In 1935, he was accused of accepting bribes to help three Italian immigrants avoid deportation by obtaining U.S. citizenship. Hogan provided false affidavits stating they had arrived before 1924, which would have made them eligible for citizenship, when in fact they arrived after 1924, meaning they were ineligible. Hogan was convicted and sentenced to a year and a day in federal prison.

== Death and burial ==
Hogan died at his home, 8 Bramshott Court in Rockville Centre, New York, May 7, 1940. He was interred at Green-wood Cemetery in Brooklyn.

== Family ==
In 1906, Hogan married Anna Marie Brittan. Their children included Annmarie (b. 1907) and Redmond (1910-1990).

== See also ==
- List of American federal politicians convicted of crimes

U.S. House of Representatives
Preceded by James P. Maher	Member of the U.S. House of Representatives from New York's 7th congressional district 1921–1923	Succeeded by John Quayle
