= James P. Maher =

American politician (1865–1946)

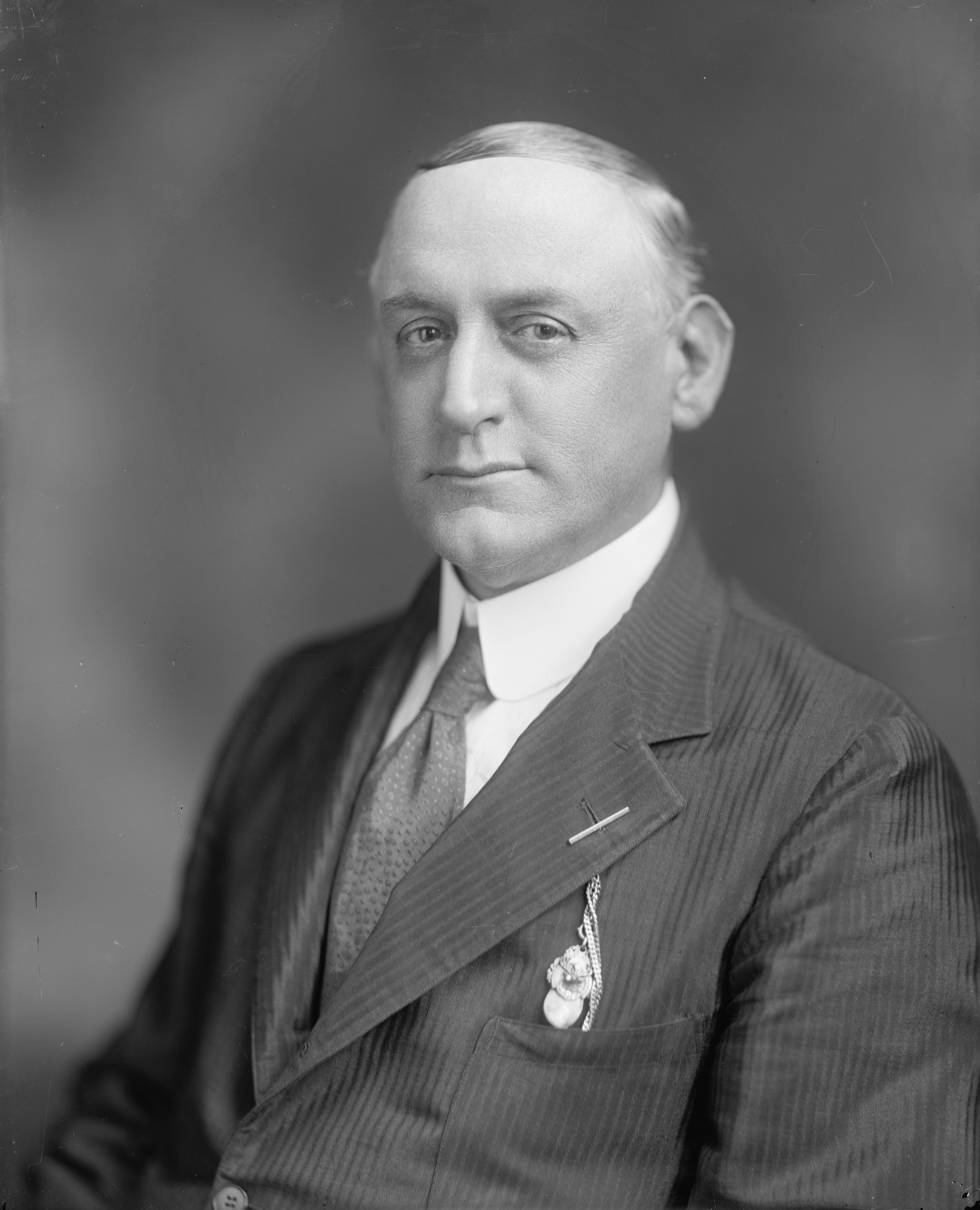

Member of the U.S. House of Representatives from New York
- In office March 4, 1911 – March 3, 1921
- Preceded by: Otto G. Foelker
- Succeeded by: Michael J. Hogan
- Constituency: 3rd district (1911–13); 5th district (1913–19); 7th district (1919–21)

Mayor of Keansburg, New Jersey
- In office January 1, 1926 – March 15, 1927
- Preceded by: Thomas J. Gilmore
- Succeeded by: Clarence H. Watson

Personal details
- Born: James Paul Maher; November 3, 1865 Brooklyn, New York, U.S.
- Died: July 31, 1946 (aged 80) Keansburg, New Jersey, U.S.
- Resting place: St. Joseph's Cemetery, Keyport, New Jersey
- Party: Democratic
- Spouse: Mary Jane Moran (m. 1890-1937, her death)
- Profession: Hatter; Union treasurer Real estate broker

James Paul Maher (November 3, 1865 – July 31, 1946) was an American labor union official, businessman, and politician. A Democrat, he is most notable for his service as a U.S. representative from New York, a position he held for five terms from 1911 to 1921.

== Early life ==
Maher was born in Brooklyn, New York, one of several children born to Irish immigrants John and Maria Maher. He attended the parochial schools of Brooklyn and graduated from Brooklyn's St. Patrick's Academy. Apprenticed as a hatter, he moved to Danbury, Connecticut in 1887 and was employed as a hat sizer and in other positions on the factory floor.

== Career ==
He was active in his local union and the American Federation of Labor. Maher became treasurer of the United Hatters of North America in 1897, a post he held until his election to Congress. As a labor union leader, he gained a reputation for successful mediation and adjudication of worker-management disputes. Maher returned to Brooklyn in 1902 and was active with several charitable and fraternal organizations, including the Civic Association of New York, Society of the Holy Name, Knights of Columbus, and Benevolent and Protective Order of Elks.

=== Congress ===
Maher was an unsuccessful candidate for election to the Sixty-first Congress in 1908. He was elected as a Democrat to the Sixty-second and to the four succeeding Congresses (March 4, 1911 – March 3, 1921). He served as chairman of the Committee on Expenditures in the Department of Labor (Sixty-third through Sixty-fifth Congresses). He was an unsuccessful candidate for reelection in 1920 to the Sixty-seventh Congress.

=== Later career ===
After leaving Congress, Maher entered the real estate business in Brooklyn. He later moved to Keansburg, New Jersey, where he continued in real estate. In 1925, Keansburg employed a borough manager to oversee the local government's day-to-day operations, and reduced the size of its town council from five members to three. Maher ran successfully for a seat on the council, and was the top vote getter among the candidates. Upon taking office in January 1926, Maher was chosen to serve as mayor. He served until March 1927, when voter dissatisfaction with a significant increase in the municipal budget and the taxes to fund it led to his recall. In 1937, Maher was an unsuccessful candidate for the town council.

== Death and burial ==
Maher died in Keansburg on July 31, 1946. He was buried at St. Joseph's Cemetery, Keyport, New Jersey.

== Family ==
In 1890, Maher married Mary Jane (Moran) Maher (1867–1937). They were the parents of a son, Charles Maher, who lived in Keansburg.

== Sources ==
- United States Congress. "James P. Maher (id: M000063)". Biographical Directory of the United States Congress.

U.S. House of Representatives
Preceded by Otto G. Foelker	Member of the U.S. House of Representatives from New York's 3rd congressional district 1911–1913	Succeeded by Frank E. Wilson
Preceded by William C. Redfield	Member of the U.S. House of Representatives from New York's 5th congressional district 1913–1919	Succeeded by John B. Johnston
Preceded by John J. Delaney	Member of the U.S. House of Representatives from New York's 7th congressional district 1919–1921	Succeeded by Michael J. Hogan
