= Charles Bodle =

American politician

Member of the U.S. House of Representatives from New York's 7th district
- In office March 4, 1833 – March 3, 1835
- Preceded by: John C. Brodhead
- Succeeded by: Nicholas Sickles

Personal details
- Born: July 1, 1788 Poughkeepsie, New York
- Died: October 30, 1835 (aged 47) Bloomingburg
- Citizenship: United States
- Party: Jacksonian
- Spouse: Esther Wood Bodle
- Children: Catharine; Vashti; William
- Profession: Wagon maker

Charles Bodle (July 1, 1788 – October 30, 1835) was an American politician who served one term as a U.S. representative from New York from 1833 to 1835.

== Biography ==
Charles Bodle was born near Poughkeepsie, New York on July 1, 1788. He was a wagon maker by trade, and held several political offices in Bloomingburg, including Justice of the Peace. From 1827 to 1833 he was Town Supervisor of Mamakating.

=== Congress ===
Elected as a Jacksonian to the Twenty-third Congress, Bodle was the Representative of New York's 7th District, serving from March 4, 1833, to March 3, 1835.

== Death ==
Bodle died in Bloomingburg on October 30, 1835. He was interred at Bloomingburg Cemetery in Bloomingburg.

== Family ==
Bodle was married to Esther Wood Bodle (1787-1848). Their children included Catharine Sarah (1824-1833), Vashti (1821-1864), and William W. (b. 1817).

U.S. House of Representatives
Preceded by John C. Brodhead	Member of the U.S. House of Representatives from New York's 7th congressional district March 4, 1833 – March 3, 1835	Succeeded by Nicholas Sickles
