= Boston Courier =

American newspaper

The Boston Courier
- Type: Daily newspaper from 1824 to 1866; Weekly newspaper from 1867 to 1915
- Founded: March 2, 1824
- Language: English
- Ceased publication: April 10, 1915
- Headquarters: Boston, Massachusetts

The Boston Courier was an American newspaper based in Boston, Massachusetts. It was founded on March 2, 1824, by Joseph T. Buckingham as a daily newspaper which supported protectionism. Buckingham served as editor until he sold out completely in 1848, after suffering a severe financial crisis in 1837 and losing much of his editorial authority. The Boston Courier supported the National Republicans, and later the Whig Party. In the period before the American Civil War, its editors, including George S. Hillard and George Lunt, supported the states' right position on the abolition of slavery. From 1867 to 1915 the Boston Courier (New Series) was a weekly newspaper published by Libbey & Dennison.

== See also ==
- The Boston Daily Advertiser
- The Boston Herald
- The Boston Globe
- The Boston Journal
- The Boston News-Letter
- The Boston Post
- The Boston Evening Transcript
