= Nicholas Muller =

Luxembourgish-American politician (1836–1917)

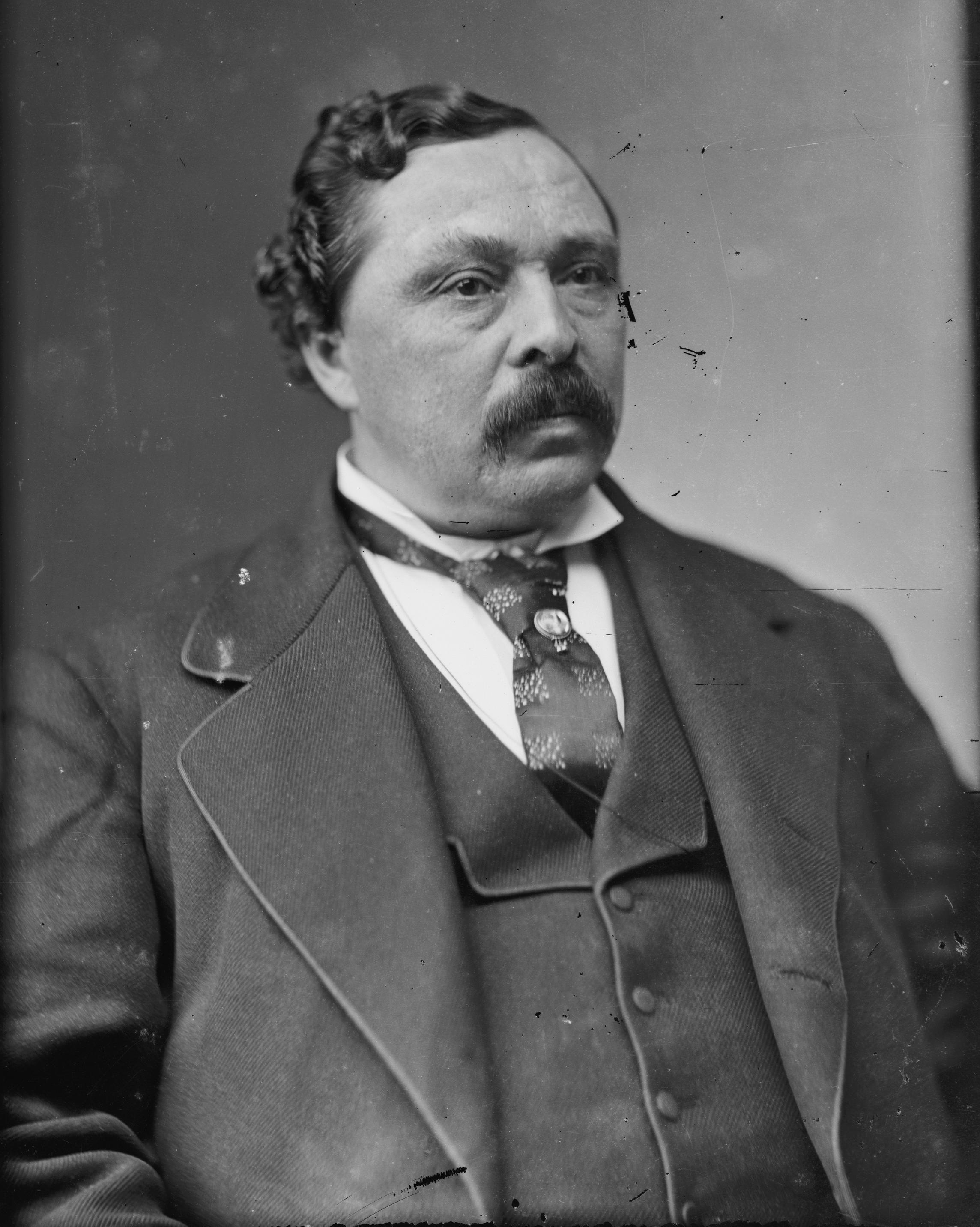
- Muller, c. 1865 – c. 1880 by Mathew Brady

Member of the U.S. House of Representatives from New York
- In office March 4, 1899 – November 2, 1901
- Preceded by: John H. G. Vehslage
- Succeeded by: Montague Lessler
- Constituency: 7th district
- In office March 4, 1883 – March 3, 1887
- Preceded by: Benjamin Wood
- Succeeded by: Amos J. Cummings
- Constituency: 5th district (1883–85); 6th district (1885–87)
- In office March 4, 1877 – March 3, 1881
- Preceded by: Edwin R. Meade
- Succeeded by: Benjamin Wood
- Constituency: 5th district

Member of the New York State Assembly
- In office 1875–1876
- Constituency: New York County 1st district

Personal details
- Born: November 15, 1836 Differdange, Luxembourg
- Died: December 12, 1917 (aged 81) New Brighton, Staten Island, U.S.
- Resting place: Green-Wood Cemetery
- Party: Democratic

Nicholas Muller (November 15, 1836 – December 12, 1917) was a Luxembourgish-born American banker and politician who served four different stints as a United States representative from New York during the late 19th and early 20th century. In all, he served five terms in office.

== Early life ==
Born in Differdange, Luxembourg, he attended the common schools in the city of Metz and afterward the Athénée de Luxembourg. He immigrated to the United States with his parents, who settled in New York City, and was employed as a railroad ticket agent for more than 20 years. He was one of the promoters and original directors of the Germania Bank in New York City.

== Career ==
He was a member of the New York State Assembly (New York Co., 1st D.) in 1875 and 1876. He was a member of the State central committee in 1875, and was elected as a Democrat to the 45th and 46th United States Congresses, holding office from March 4, 1877, to March 4, 1881. During the latter Congress he was Chairman of the Committee on Expenditures in the Department of the Interior. He was again elected to the 48th and 49th United States Congresses, holding office from March 4, 1883, to March 4, 1887; in both Congresses he was chairman of the Committee on Militia.

Muller was appointed President of the Metropolitan Police Board in 1888. He subsequently served as president of the excise board and as quarantine commissioner. He was again elected to the 56th and 57th United States Congresses, holding office from March 4, 1899, until his resignation on November 22, 1901. He was an unsuccessful candidate for Staten Island borough president in 1901, and was appointed as tax commissioner in 1904.

== Death ==
He died in New Brighton, Staten Island in 1917, aged 81, and was interred in Green-Wood Cemetery.

New York State Assembly
Preceded by James Healey	New York State Assembly; New York County, 1st District; 1875–1876	Succeeded by James Healey
U.S. House of Representatives
Preceded by Edwin R. Meade	Member of the U.S. House of Representatives from New York's 5th congressional district 1877–1881	Succeeded by Benjamin Wood
Preceded by Benjamin Wood	Member of the U.S. House of Representatives from New York's 5th congressional district 1883–1885	Succeeded by Archibald M. Bliss
Preceded by Samuel S. Cox	Member of the U.S. House of Representatives from New York's 6th congressional district 1885–1887	Succeeded by Amos J. Cummings
Preceded by John H. G. Vehslage	Member of the U.S. House of Representatives from New York's 7th congressional district 1899–1901	Succeeded by Montague Lessler
