= Elijah Ward =

American politician (1816–1882)

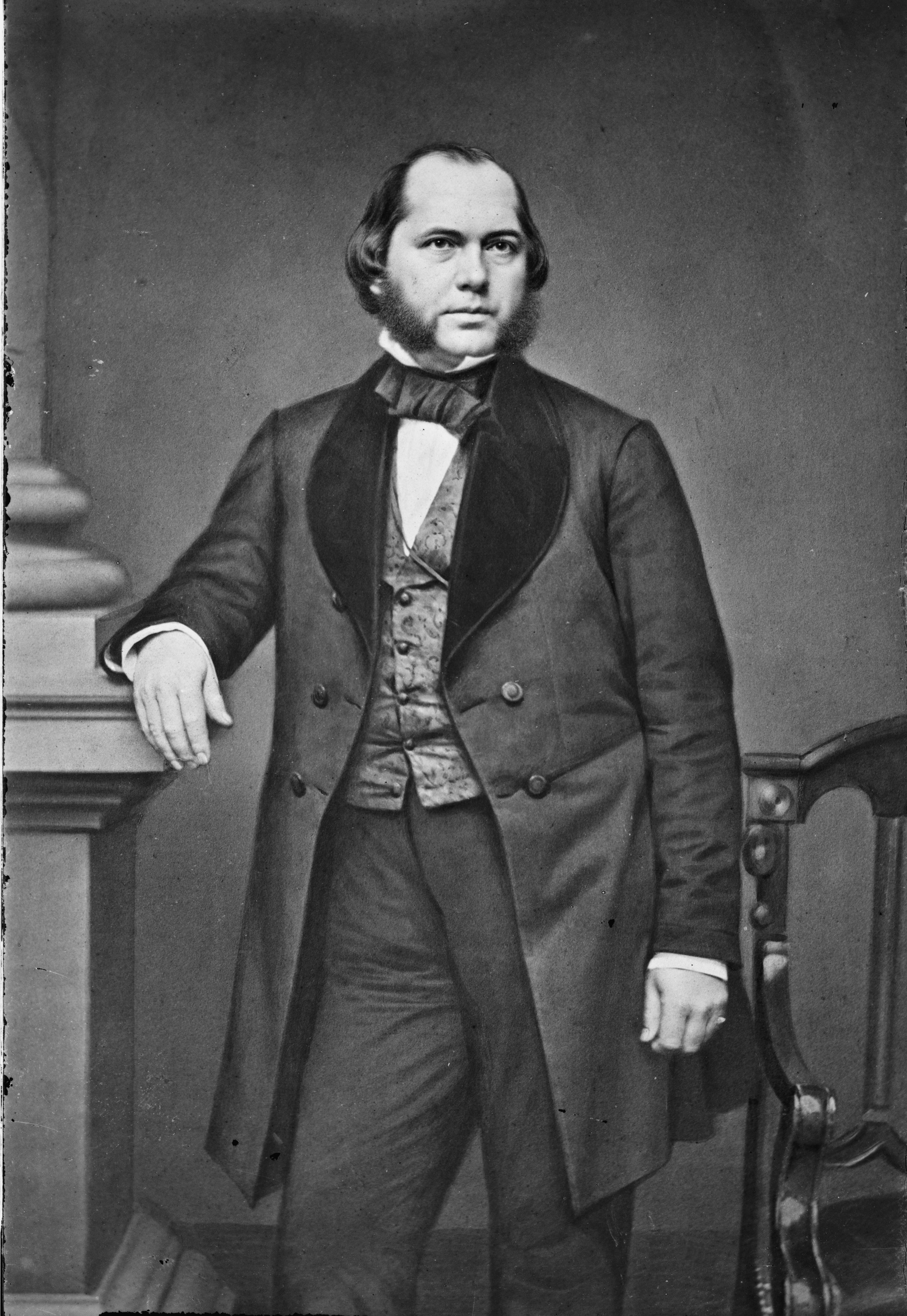
- Ward, 1855–1865

Member of the U.S. House of Representatives from New York
- In office March 4, 1875 – March 3, 1877
- Preceded by: John D. Lawson
- Succeeded by: Anson G. McCook
- Constituency: 8th district
- In office March 4, 1861 – March 3, 1865
- Preceded by: George Briggs
- Succeeded by: Henry Jarvis Raymond
- Constituency: 7th district (1861–1863); 6th district (1863–1865)
- In office March 4, 1857 – March 3, 1859
- Preceded by: Thomas Child Jr.
- Succeeded by: George Briggs
- Constituency: 7th district

Personal details
- Born: September 16, 1816 Sing Sing, New York, U.S.
- Died: February 7, 1882 (aged 65) Roslyn, New York, U.S.
- Party: Democratic
- Spouse: Ellen Cairns Stuart (m. 1866)
- Relations: Aaron Ward (uncle)
- Education: New York University

Elijah Ward (September 16, 1816 – February 7, 1882) was a U.S. Congressman during the American Civil War and the Reconstruction era.

== Early life ==
Ward was born in Sing Sing (now Ossining), New York. He pursued classical studies at the Common Schools in Sing Sing.

== Career ==
In 1833, he came to New York City to engage in commercial pursuits and, at the same time, study law in the office of his uncle, Maj. Gen. Aaron Ward, who was then a U.S. Representative from Westchester County. In 1838, he began attending the law department of New York University, and was admitted to the bar in 1843 and thereafter commenced practice in New York City. In 1839, he was elected president of the Mercantile Library Association of New York City.

Ward was judge advocate general of the State from1853 to 1855, and was appointed on Governor Horatio Seymour's staff with the rank of Brigadier General. He was also a delegate to the Democratic National Convention in 1856.

=== U.S. Congress ===
He was elected as a Democrat, over George Briggs on the "Native American" ticket and Gen. James W. Nye, the Republican candidate (who later became the Governor of Nevada Territory and a U.S. Senator from Nevada), to the Thirty-fifth Congress, serving from March 4, 1857 to March 3, 1859, but was an unsuccessful candidate for reelection in 1858.

He was subsequently elected to the Thirty-seventh and Thirty-eighth Congresses serving from March 4, 1861, to March 3, 1865, but again was an unsuccessful candidate for reelection in 1864, losing to Henry Jarvis Raymond. He resumed the practice of law in New York City, and then was elected to the Forty-fourth Congress and served one term, from March 4, 1875, to March 3, 1877, as he was an unsuccessful candidate for reelection in 1876, losing to General Anson G. McCook. While in Congress, he served on the Committees on Roads and Canals, and in his last term, he was chairman of the Committee on Commerce.

== Personal life ==
On August 28, 1866, Ward was married to Ellen Eliza (née Cairns) Stuart (d. 1893), who was previously married to Lt. Robert Stuart, who died in Warrenton, Virginia, while fighting for the Union Army during the U.S. Civil War.

He died in Roslyn in Nassau County, New York, on Long Island on February 7, 1882. He was buried in Woodlawn Cemetery in the Bronx.

=== Legacy ===
After his death, his widow donated a memorial horse trough in Roslyn Harbor, New York, in his memory. Shortly after her death in 1893, her children erected the Clocktower and gave it to the Town as a memorial.

U.S. House of Representatives
Preceded by Thomas Child, Jr.	Member of the U.S. House of Representatives from New York's 7th congressional district 1857–1859	Succeeded by George Briggs
Preceded by George Briggs	Member of the U.S. House of Representatives from New York's 7th congressional district 1861–1863	Succeeded by John Winthrop Chanler
Preceded by Frederick A. Conkling	Member of the U.S. House of Representatives from New York's 6th congressional district 1863–1865	Succeeded by Henry Jarvis Raymond
Preceded by John D. Lawson	Member of the U.S. House of Representatives from New York's 8th congressional district 1875-1877	Succeeded by Anson G. McCook
