= Joseph H. Anderson =

American politician (1800–1870)

Member of the U.S. House of Representatives from New York's 7th district
- In office March 4, 1843 – March 3, 1847
- Preceded by: John Van Buren
- Succeeded by: William Nelson

Member of the New York State Assembly from the Westchester district
- In office January 1, 1833 – December 31, 1834
- Preceded by: John W. Frost
- Succeeded by: Edwin Crosby

Personal details
- Born: Joseph Halstead Anderson; August 25, 1800 White Plains, New York
- Died: June 23, 1870 (aged 69) White Plains, New York
- Resting place: "Anderson Hill", a family graveyard in Westchester County, New York.
- Citizenship: United States
- Party: Democratic Party
- Profession: farmer politician

Joseph Halstead Anderson (August 25, 1800 – June 23, 1870) was an American farmer and politician who served two terms as a U.S. representative from New York from 1843 to 1847.

== Biography ==
He was born on August 25, 1800, in Harrison, Westchester County, New York. He attended the common schools and engaged in agricultural pursuits.

=== State assembly ===
Anderson served as member of the New York State Assembly in 1833 and 1834, and he was Sheriff of Westchester County from 1835 to 1838.

=== Congress ===
Elected as a Democrat to the 28th and 29th Congresses, Anderson served from March 4, 1843, to March 3, 1847. While in Congress, he served as chairman of the Committee on Agriculture during the Twenty-ninth Congress. He was not a candidate for renomination in 1846 and resumed his farming pursuits.

=== Death and burial ===
Anderson died on June 23, 1870, in White Plains, New York, and was interred at a family graveyard, "Anderson Hill", Westchester County, New York.

=== Family ===
New York State Senator Henry A. Wise (1906–1982) was his great-grandson.

New York State Assembly
Preceded by John W. Frost	New York State Assembly; Westchester; 1833–1834	Succeeded by Edwin Crosby
U.S. House of Representatives
Preceded by John Van Buren	Member of the U.S. House of Representatives from New York's 7th congressional district 1843–1847	Succeeded by William Nelson
