= Thomas Child Jr. =

American politician

Thomas Child

Member of the U.S. House of Representatives from New York's 7th district
- In office March 4, 1855 – March 3, 1857
- Preceded by: William A. Walker
- Succeeded by: Elijah Ward

Member of the New York State Assembly from the Richmond County district
- In office January 1, 1866 – December 31, 1866
- Preceded by: James Ridgway
- Succeeded by: Nathaniel Wyeth

Town Supervisor of Northfield, New York
- In office 1863–1864
- Preceded by: Peter C. Laforge
- Succeeded by: Charles Van Name

Personal details
- Born: March 18, 1818 Bakersfield, Vermont, U.S.
- Died: March 9, 1869 (aged 50) Port Richmond, New York, U.S.
- Resting place: Green-Wood Cemetery, Brooklyn, New York, U.S.
- Party: Whig (Before 1856); Republican (1856–1869)
- Spouse: Mary Mansfield (m. 1844)
- Children: 5
- Education: University of Vermont (BA)
- Profession: Attorney

Thomas Child Jr. (March 18, 1818 – March 9, 1869) was an American lawyer and politician. Originally from Bakersfield, Vermont, he graduated from the University of Vermont in 1838 and became an attorney in Berkshire, Vermont. Child later relocated to New York City, and he was a longtime resident of Staten Island.

Originally a Whig, he served one term as in the United States House of Representatives, March 4, 1855 to March 3, 1857. After the end of the Whig Party, Child became a Democrat, but joined the Republican Party because of his stance in favor of the Union during the American Civil War. He went on to serve as town supervisor of Northfield, New York from 1863 to 1864, and a member of the New York State Assembly in 1866.

== Life ==
Thomas Child Jr. was born in Bakersfield, Vermont on March 18, 1818, a son of attorney Thomas Child (1779-1862) and Lydia Adams Child (1780-1853). Child attended the common schools and entered the University of Vermont at the age of fourteen. He graduated in 1838, and served the same year as a member of the State constitutional convention.

=== Legal career ===
Child studied law with his father, was admitted to the bar in September 1839, and commenced practice in Berkshire, Vermont. He was a partner of Homer E. Royce, who had also studied with Timothy Child Sr., and served as a justice of the peace beginning in 1840. He moved to New York City in 1848 and engaged in the distilling business.

=== Congress ===
Child was elected as a Whig to the 34th United States Congress, for the term beginning on March 4, 1855, but never took his seat due to illness. On March 3, 1857, the last day of the session, the House resolved that his salary be paid to him from August 18, 1856 to March 3, 1857, as "though he had been in regular attendance at the sittings of the House".

=== Later career ===
He moved to Port Richmond on Staten Island, in 1857 and retired from active business. After the demise of the Whigs, Child became a Democrat, but his pro-Union position during the American Civil War caused him to identify with the Republican Party. He was Town Supervisor of Northfield from 1863 to 1864. He was a member of the New York State Assembly (Richmond County) in 1866.

=== Death and burial ===
Child died in Port Richmond on March 9, 1869. He was buried at Green-Wood Cemetery in Brooklyn.

== See also ==
- List of United States representatives-elect who never took their seats

New York State Assembly
Preceded by James S. Thorn	New York State Assembly; Rensselaer County, 2nd District; 1866	Succeeded by John L. Flagg
U.S. House of Representatives
Preceded by William A. Walker	Member of the U.S. House of Representatives from New York's 7th congressional district 1855–1857	Succeeded by Elijah Ward
