= William Adams Walker =

American politician

William A. Walker

Member of the U.S. House of Representatives from New York's 7th district
- In office March 4, 1853 – March 3, 1855
- Preceded by: Abraham P. Stephens
- Succeeded by: Thomas Child, Jr.

Personal details
- Born: William Adams Walker; June 5, 1805 Portsmouth, New Hampshire, U.S.
- Died: December 18, 1861 (aged 56) Irvington, New York, U.S.
- Resting place: Sleepy Hollow Cemetery, Tarrytown, New York, U.S.
- Party: Democratic
- Education: Northampton Law School

William Adams Walker (June 5, 1805 – December 18, 1861) was an American educator and politician who served one term as a U.S. representative from New York from 1853 to 1855.

== Biography ==
Born in Portsmouth, New Hampshire, Walker attended the common schools and Northampton Law School. He was admitted to the bar but never engaged in the practice of law.

=== Early career ===
He moved to New York City in 1832. He was appointed principal of a public school in New York City, and became county superintendent of common schools from 1843 to 1847. He served as member of the board of aldermen in 1846, but was defeated for reelection in 1847. He served as commissioner of jurors until elected to Congress.

=== Congress ===
Walker was elected as a Democrat to the Thirty-third Congress (March 4, 1853 – March 3, 1855).

He declined to be a candidate for renomination in 1854.

=== Later career and death ===
In 1857, he ran but lost for board of aldermen.

He died in Irvington, New York, December 18, 1861. He was interred in Sleepy Hollow Cemetery, Tarrytown, New York.

== Sources ==
U.S. House of Representatives
Preceded by Abraham P. Stephens	Member of the U.S. House of Representatives from New York's 7th congressional district 1853–1855	Succeeded by Thomas Child, Jr.
