= John D. Lawson (politician) =

American politician

Member of the U.S. House of Representatives from New York's 8th district
- In office March 4, 1873 – March 3, 1875
- Preceded by: James Brooks
- Succeeded by: Daniel McNamara

Personal details
- Born: John Daniel Lawson; February 18, 1816 Montgomery, New York, U.S.
- Died: January 24, 1896 (aged 79) New York City, U.S.
- Party: Republican

John Daniel Lawson (February 18, 1816 – January 24, 1896) was a U.S. Representative from New York.

Born in Montgomery, New York, Lawson attended the public schools, moved to New York City and was employed as a clerk in a dry-goods store. He became a successful merchant, and was active in politics as a Republican. Lawson served as a delegate to every Republican state, county, and district convention for thirty years, as well as the national conventions from 1868 to 1892. In 1884 he succeeded Thomas C. Platt as New York's member of the Republican National Committee.

Lawson was elected as a Republican to the Forty-third Congress (March 4, 1873 – March 3, 1875). After his unsuccessful bid for reelection, he resumed his former business pursuits. He died in New York City on January 24, 1896.

== Sources ==
- United States Congress. "John D. Lawson (id: L000144)". Biographical Directory of the United States Congress.

U.S. House of Representatives
Preceded by James Brooks	Member of the U.S. House of Representatives from New York's 8th congressional district 1873 - 1875	Succeeded by Elijah Ward
