= George Stillman Hillard =

American politician (1808–1879)

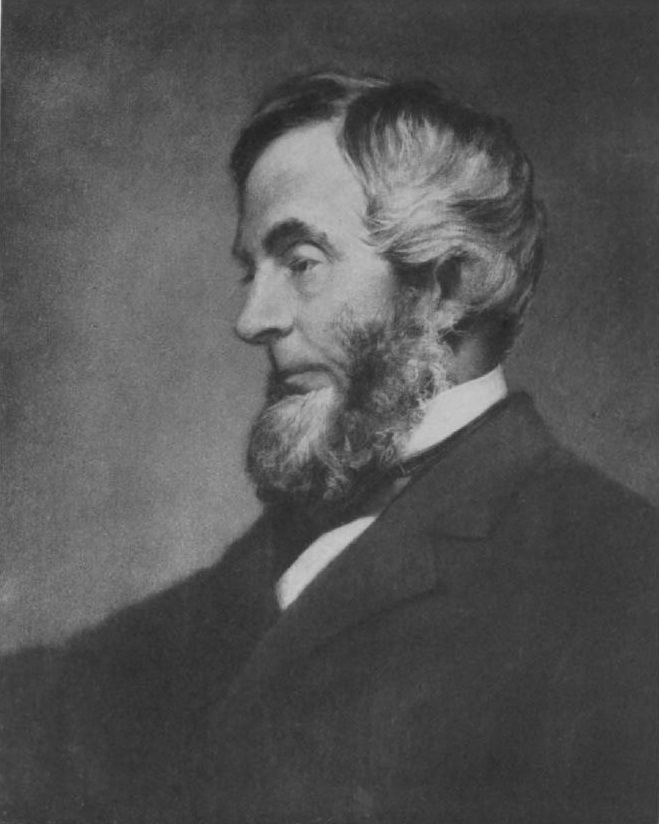

United States Attorney for the District of Massachusetts
- In office 1866–1870
- Preceded by: Richard Henry Dana Jr.
- Succeeded by: David H. Mason

President of the Boston Common Council
- In office July 1, 1846 – July 1, 1847
- Preceded by: Peleg Chandler
- Succeeded by: Benjamin Seaver

Personal details
- Born: September 22, 1808 Machias, Maine, US
- Died: January 21, 1879 (aged 70) Boston, Massachusetts, US
- Resting place: Mount Auburn Cemetery
- Party: Democratic
- Education: Harvard University; Northampton Law School; Harvard Law School
- Occupation: Attorney
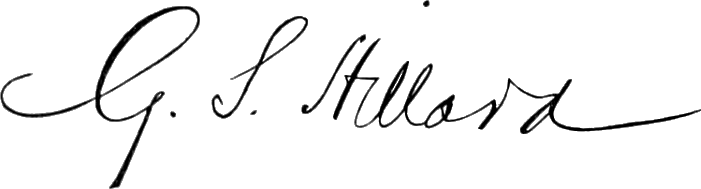
- Signature

George Stillman Hillard (September 22, 1808 – January 21, 1879) was an American lawyer and writer. Besides developing his Boston legal practice (with Charles Sumner as a partner), he served in the Massachusetts legislature, edited several Boston journals, and wrote on literature, politics and travel.

== Biography ==
Hillard was born at Machias, Maine, on September 22, 1808, and he was educated at the Boston Latin School. After graduating at Harvard College from 1828, he taught in the Round Hill School at Northampton, Massachusetts and attended Northampton Law School. He graduated at the Harvard Law School in 1832, and in 1833 he was admitted to the bar in Boston, where he entered into partnership with Charles Sumner, and developed an extensive legal practice.

Hillard was a Democrat who opposed slavery and supported the Union during the American Civil War. He was a member of the Massachusetts legislature: the Massachusetts House of Representatives in 1836, and the Massachusetts Senate in 1850. There he was conspicuous as an orator, and his policies were praised by Daniel Webster. Hillard was a member of the Boston Common Council and served as its president in from July 1, 1846, through July 1, 1847. He was a member of the Massachusetts constitutional convention of 1853, city solicitor for Boston from 1854 until 1856, and in 1866–70 was United States district attorney for Massachusetts.

Beginning in 1837, Hillard rented rooms to Nathaniel Hawthorne, who had recently taken a job at the customhouse in Boston. Around that time, he was a founding member of an informal social group called the Five of Clubs which also included Sumner, author Henry Russell Cleveland (1809–1843), Cornelius Conway Felton, and Henry Wadsworth Longfellow.

Hillard was the first Dean of the Boston University School of Law. He was also the recipient of an honorary LL.D. from Trinity College.

Hillard devoted a large portion of his time to literature. With George Ripley, he edited the Christian Register, a Unitarian weekly, beginning in 1833; in 1834, in association with Sumner, he became editor of The American Jurist (1829–1843), a legal journal to which Sumner, Simon Greenleaf and Theron Metcalf contributed; and from 1856 to 1861 he was an associate editor of the Boston Courier.

He wrote the 19th-century school textbook series Hillard's Readers. "He is credited with having instilled a love of good literature, and a knowledge of the best English writers to generations of Americans".

== Public speaking ==
In addition to his oratorical contributions in meetings of the Massachusetts legislature, he gave the July 4 oration in Boston in 1835; a lecture on "Public Instruction in Prussia" (1836); a speech on "The Relation of the Poet to his Age," at Harvard (1843); he spoke on “Dangers and Duties of the Mercantile Profession” to the Mercantile Library Association (1850); he spoke before the New York New England Society (1851); and he delivered a eulogy on Daniel Webster in 1852. He gave a series of 12 lectures on the “Life and Writings of Milton” as part of the Lowell Institute's lecture series for the 1846–47 season.

== Writings ==
His publications include:

- memoirs of James Brown and Jeremiah Mason (privately printed)
- a life of Captain John Smith for Sparks's “American Biography”
- The Poetical Works of Edmund Spenser, with a critical introduction (5 vols., Boston, 1839)
- a translation of François Guizot's “Essay on the Character and Influence of George Washington” (1840)
- memoir of Henry Russell Cleveland with a selection from his writings (privately printed, 1845)
- Memorial of Daniel Webster (1853)
- Six Months in Italy (2 vols., 1853)
- Selections from the Works of Walter Savage Landor (1856)
- Life and Campaigns of George B. McClellan (Philadelphia, 1864)
- “Political Duties of the Educated Classes,” a speech and pamphlet (Boston, 1866)
- Life, Letters, and Journals of George Ticknor, with Mrs. Ticknor (1876)
- a series of school Readers

and many articles in periodicals and encyclopedias.

== Death and burial ==
Hillard died at his home in the Longwood neighborhood of Boston on January 21, 1879. He was buried at Mount Auburn Cemetery in Cambridge.

== Family ==
In 1834 Hillard married Susan Tracy Howe, the daughter of Northampton Law School founder Judge Samuel Howe. They had one child, George S. Hillard Jr. (1836-1838).
