= John H. G. Vehslage =

American politician (1842–1904)

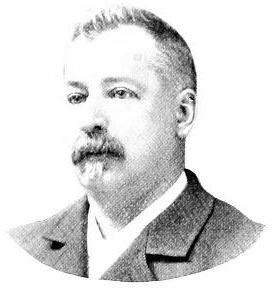
- Vehslage in 1894

Member of the U.S. House of Representatives from New York's 7th district
- In office March 4, 1897 – March 3, 1899
- Preceded by: Franklin Bartlett
- Succeeded by: Nicholas Muller

Member of the New York State Assembly from the New York County 1st district
- In office January 1, 1894 – December 31, 1894
- Preceded by: Patrick H. Duffy
- Succeeded by: Daniel E. Finn Sr.

Personal details
- Born: John Herman George Vehslage; December 20, 1842 New York City, U.S.
- Died: July 21, 1904 (aged 61) New York City, U.S.
- Resting place: Lutheran Cemetery, New York City, U.S.
- Party: Democratic
- Occupation: Politician, merchant

John Herman George Vehslage (December 20, 1842 – July 21, 1904) was an American merchant, militia officer and politician from New York.

== Life ==
Born in New York City, Vehslage attended the public schools. He left school to become a clerk in the retail grocery business. Later he engaged in the coal and wood business.

He joined the Third Cavalry, New York National Guard, in 1863 and was commissioned a captain by Gov. Horatio Seymour on February 15, 1864. He was appointed inspector of rifle practice with the rank of captain and continued in service until 1880, when the regiment was mustered out by order of Governor Cornell. He remained as supernumerary until November 12, 1883, when he received an honorable discharge from Gov. Grover Cleveland.

He was a member of the New York State Assembly (New York Co., 1st D.) in 1894.

Vehslage was elected as a Democrat to the 55th United States Congress, holding office from March 4, 1897 to March 3, 1899.

He died in New York City on July 21, 1904; and was buried at the Lutheran Cemetery in Brooklyn.

== Sources ==
- United States Congress. "John H. G. Vehslage (id: V000080)". Biographical Directory of the United States Congress.

New York State Assembly
Preceded by Patrick H. Duffy	New York State Assembly; New York County, 1st District; 1894	Succeeded by Daniel E. Finn
U.S. House of Representatives
Preceded by Franklin Bartlett	Member of the U.S. House of Representatives from New York's 7th congressional district 1897–1899	Succeeded by Nicholas Muller
