= John C. Brodhead =

American politician

Member of the U.S. House of Representatives from New York's 7th district
- In office March 4, 1837 – March 3, 1839
- Preceded by: Nicholas Sickles
- Succeeded by: Rufus Palen
- In office March 4, 1831 – March 3, 1833
- Preceded by: Charles G. DeWitt
- Succeeded by: Charles Bodle

Personal details
- Born: John Curtis Brodhead; October 27, 1780 Modena, New York, U.S.
- Died: January 2, 1859 (aged 78) Modena, New York, U.S.
- Resting place: Modena Rural Cemetery; Modena, New York
- Party: Jacksonian; Democrat
- Profession: Politician

John Curtis Brodhead (October 27, 1780 – January 2, 1859) was an American politician in the U.S. state of New York. He represented New York in the United States House of Representatives for two non-consecutive terms from 1831 to 1833, and from 1837 to 1839.

== Biography ==
Brodhead was born in Modena, New York to Charles W. (1729-1789) and Mary W. (Oliver) Brodhead (1740-1814), and attended the district schools. He was engaged in mercantile and agricultural pursuits, and served as the Town of Plattekill Supervisor from 1823 to 1824, and served as Sheriff of Ulster County, New York from 1825 to 1828.

=== Congress ===
He represented New York's 7th congressional district twice in the U.S. House of Representatives. He served first as a Jacksonian in the Twenty-second Congress, serving from March 4, 1831 to March 3, 1833. He was not a candidate for reelection in 1832.

He then served as a Democrat in the Twenty-fifth Congress, serving from March 4, 1837 to March 3, 1839. During the Twenty-fifth Congress, Brodhead served as chairman of the Committee on Expenditures in the Department of the Navy. He declined to be a candidate for re-nomination in 1838, and resumed his mercantile and agricultural pursuits after leaving Congress.

=== Death ===
He died in Modena, New York on January 2, 1859, and is interred in Modena Rural Cemetery in Modena.

== Family ==
His first cousin, Matthew Oliver (1780-1865), served as the Town of Marbletown Supervisor from 1829 to 1837. Matthew's son James Oliver (1806-1893) held this position from 1839 to 1840.

== Notes ==
U.S. House of Representatives
Preceded by Charles G. DeWitt	Member of the U.S. House of Representatives from New York's 7th congressional district 1831 - 1833	Succeeded by Charles Bodle
Preceded by Nicholas Sickles	Member of the U.S. House of Representatives from New York's 7th congressional district 1837 - 1839	Succeeded by Rufus Palen
