= George Briggs (New York politician) =

American politician

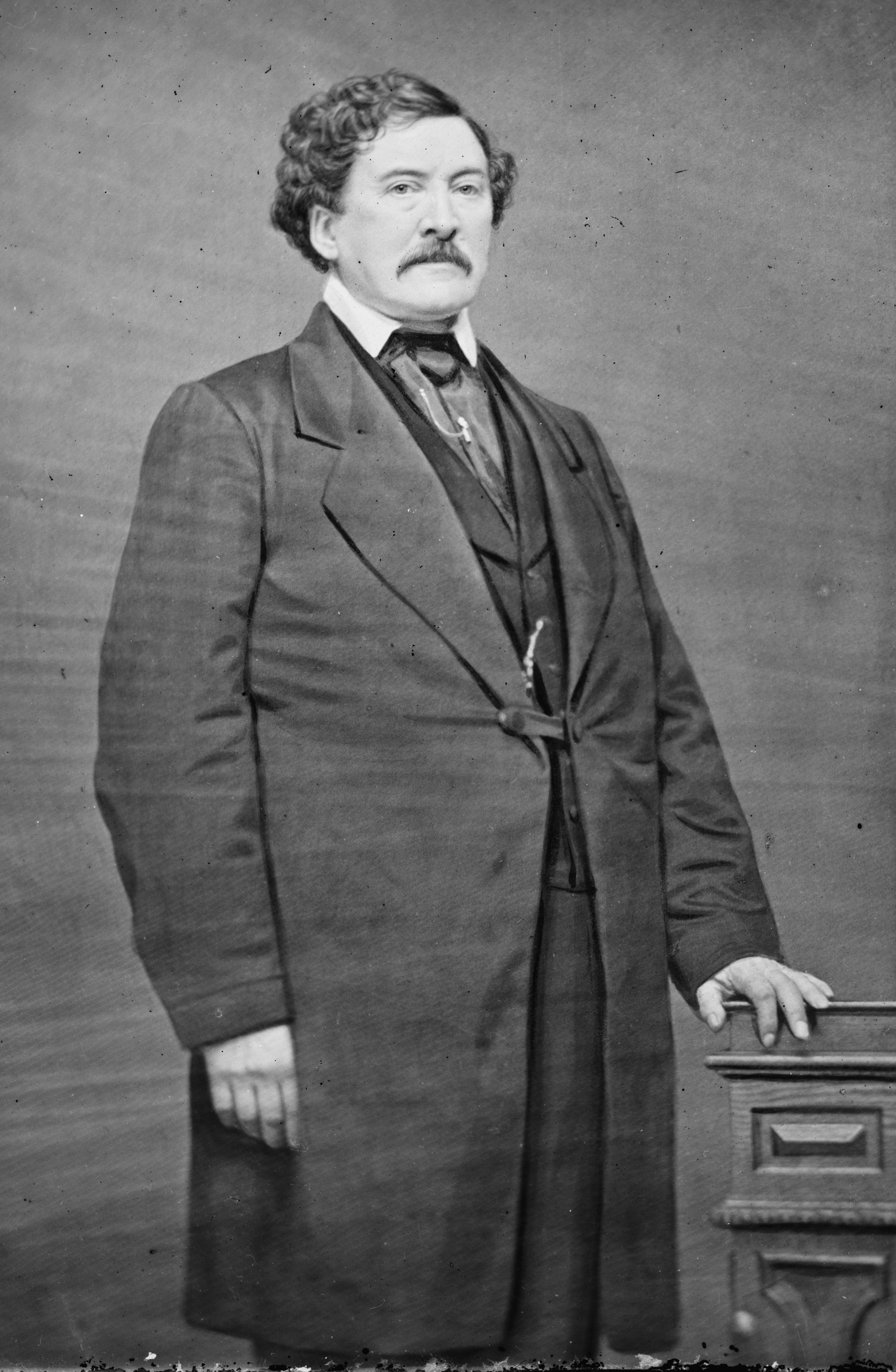

Member of the U.S. House of Representatives from New York
- In office March 4, 1859 – March 3, 1861
- Preceded by: Elijah Ward
- Succeeded by: Elijah Ward
- Constituency: 7th district
- In office March 4, 1849 – March 3, 1853
- Preceded by: Frederick A. Tallmadge
- Succeeded by: William M. Tweed
- Constituency: 5th district

Member of the Vermont House of Representatives from Bennington
- In office 1837–1838
- Preceded by: Stephen Dewey
- Succeeded by: Samuel H. Blackmer

Personal details
- Born: May 6, 1805 Broadalbin, New York, U.S.
- Died: June 30, 1869 (aged 64) Saratoga Springs, New York, U.S.
- Resting place: Green-Wood Cemetery, Brooklyn, New York, U.S.
- Party: Whig; Republican; Constitutional Union
- Occupation: Hardware dealer

George Briggs (May 6, 1805 – June 30, 1869) was an American businessman and politician. He served in the Vermont House of Representatives from 1837 to 1838, and as a member of the United States House of Representatives from New York from 1849 to 1853, and 1859 to 1861.

== Biography ==
Briggs was born near Broadalbin, New York, where he lived until 1812, when his family relocated to Bennington. He attended the public schools of Broadalbin and Bennington.

== Career ==
Briggs engaged in business as a hardware dealer and was a member of the Vermont House of Representatives from 1837 to 1838. He moved to New York City in 1838, where he continued in the hardware business.

Elected as a Whig to the 31st and 32nd United States Congresses, Briggs was United States Representative for the fifth district of New York from March 4, 1849, to March 3, 1853. He declined to be a candidate for renomination in 1852.

Briggs was then elected as a Republican to the 36th United States Congress, and was United States Representative for the seventh district of New York from March 4, 1859, to March 3, 1861. During the thirty-sixth Congress, he was Chairman of the Committee on Revolutionary Claims. He declined to be a candidate for renomination in 1860 and retired. In 1866 he was a delegate to the National Union Convention at Philadelphia.

== Death ==
Briggs died at his summer home, "Woodlawn," in Saratoga Springs, New York, on June 30, 1869. He was buried at Green-Wood Cemetery in Brooklyn, New York.

U.S. House of Representatives
Preceded by Frederick A. Tallmadge	Member of the U.S. House of Representatives from New York's 5th congressional district March 4, 1859 – March 3, 1861	Succeeded by William M. Tweed
Preceded by Elijah Ward	Member of the U.S. House of Representatives from New York's 7th congressional district March 4, 1859 – March 3, 1861	Succeeded by Elijah Ward
