= Franklin Bartlett =

American politician (1847–1909)

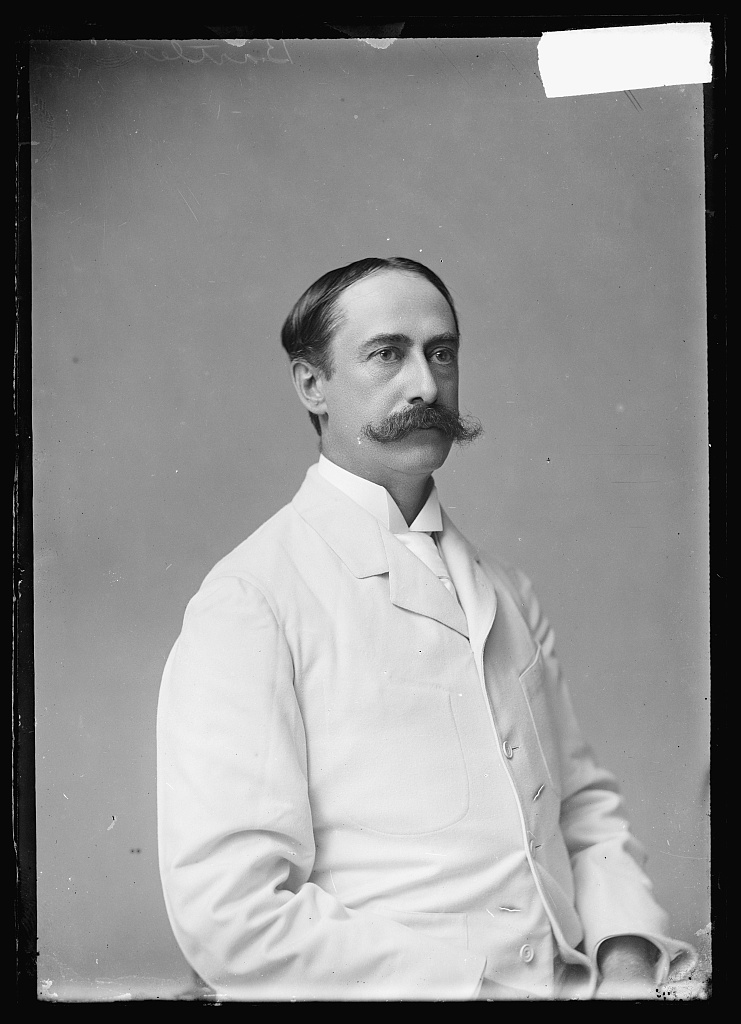

Member of the U.S. House of Representatives from New York's 7th district
- In office March 4, 1893 – March 3, 1897
- Preceded by: Edward J. Dunphy
- Succeeded by: John H. G. Vehslage

Personal details
- Born: September 10, 1847 Grafton, Massachusetts, US
- Died: April 23, 1909 (aged 61) Manhattan, New York County, New York, US
- Citizenship: United States
- Party: Democratic
- Spouse: Bertha King Post Bartlett
- Children: Bertha King Bartlett
- Education: Brooklyn Polytechnic Institute; Harvard University; Columbia Law School; Exeter College, Oxford
- Profession: Attorney; Politician

Military service
- Allegiance: United States of America
- Years of service: 1896-1906
- Rank: Colonel
- Unit: 22nd Regiment Corps of Engineers of the National Guard of New York
- Battles/wars: Spanish–American War

Franklin Bartlett (September 10, 1847 – April 23, 1909) was an American lawyer and politician. He served two terms in the United States House of Representatives, representing New York's 7th district.

== Early life ==
Bartlett was born in Grafton, Massachusetts on September 10, 1847. His parents were Agnes Fredericka Herreshoff Williard and William Osborne Bartlett, a successful lawyer. His brother was Willard Bartlett.

He graduated from the Brooklyn Polytechnic Institute in 1865. He then attended Harvard University, graduating in 1869. While at Harvard, he was a member of Delta Kappa Epsilon (aka The Dickey Club).

Barlett attended Columbia Law School in 1869 and graduated in one year. He was admitted to the bar in 1870. He continued his legal studies under James Bryce at Exeter College, Oxford in 1870 and 1870, before returning to Columbia Law School and graduating in 1873 with a A.M. and P.L.D.

== Career ==
Bartlett was a lawyer in New York City. His specialty was municipal law. He was the secretary and council of the Sun Printing and Publishing Association. He was the president of the Personal Liberty League which sought to repeal the Hart–Agnew Law anti-gambling laws.

Barlett served as a member of the constitutional commission of the State of New York in 1890. He was a delegate to the 1892 Democratic National Convention.

Bartlett was elected as a Democrat to the Fifty-third and Fifty-fourth Congresses, and served two terms from March 4, 1893, to March 3, 1897. While in congress, he served on the Appropriations Committee and Interstate and Foreign Commerce Committee. He was an unsuccessful candidate for reelection in 1896 to the fifty-fifth Congress.

He was elected colonel of the Twenty-Second Regiment Corps of Engineers of the National Guard of New York in 1896, holding that position for ten years, and served in 1898 in the Spanish–American War.

== Personal life ==
Bartlett married Bertha King Post on June 4, 1872. They had two daughters, Bertha King Bartlett and Ethel Willard Bartlett. Ethel died in 1891 when she was thirteen years old. They lived at 20 West 20th Street in Manhattan, New York.

Bartlett was a member of the New York Historical Society, the Sons of the Revolution, and the Society of Colonial Wars. In New York City, he belonged to the Harvard Club of New York City, the Knickbocker Club, the Manhattan Club, The Players, the Union Club of the City of New York, and the University Club of New York. He belonged to the Metropolitan Club in Washington, D.C. and the Camden Society in London, England. He also belonged to the Coney Jockey Club and the New York Jockey Club. He was a member of the Church of the Holy Communion.

After being bedridden for six months, Bartlett died of a kidney disorder at his home in Manhattan on April 23, 1909. He was buried at Green-Wood Cemetery in Brooklyn, New York.

U.S. House of Representatives
Preceded by Edward J. Dunphy	Member of the U.S. House of Representatives from New York's 7th congressional district 1893–1897	Succeeded by John H. G. Vehslage
