= John J. Fitzgerald =

American politician (1872–1952)

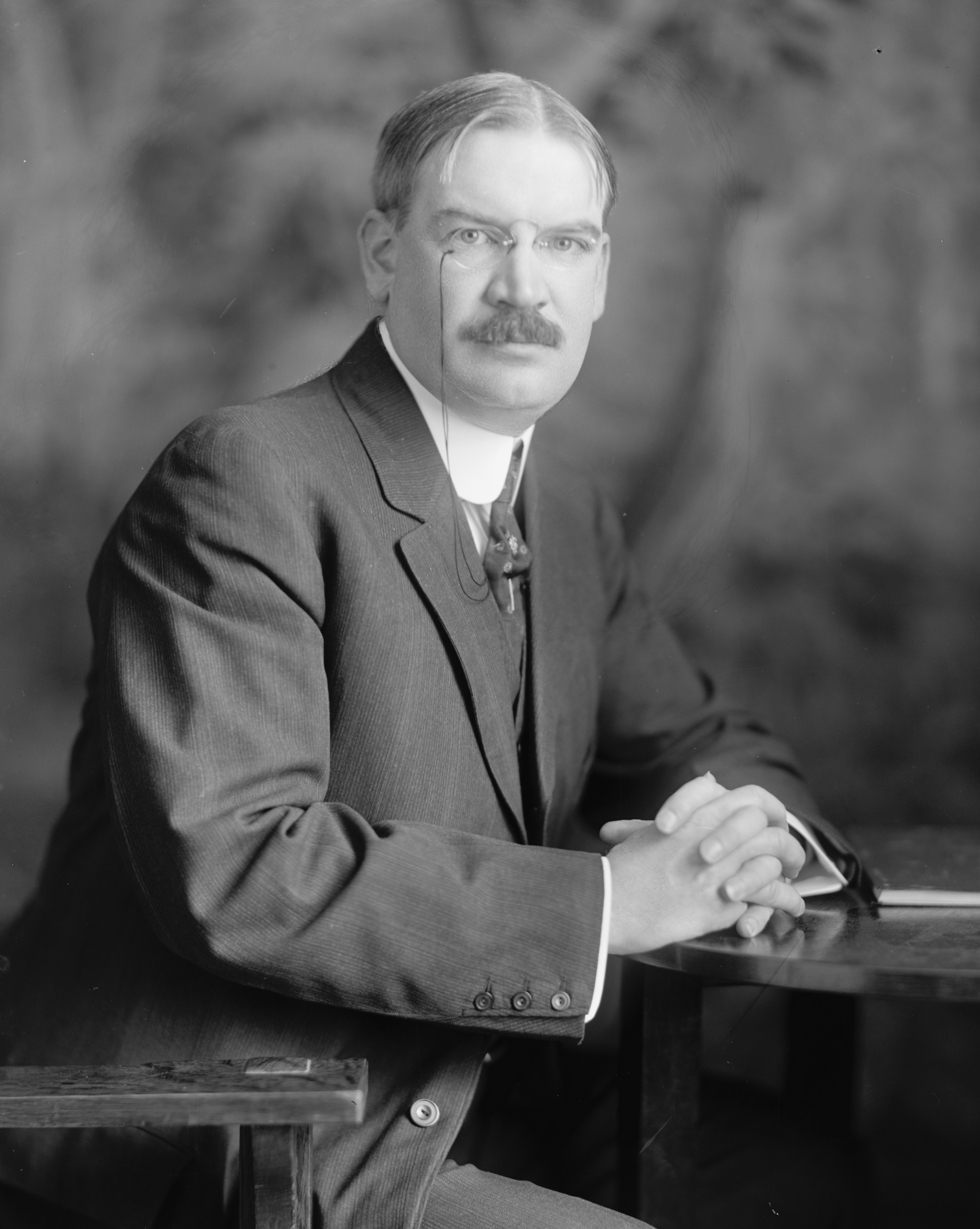
- Fitzgerald, 1905–1945

Member of the U.S. House of Representatives from New York
- In office March 4, 1899 – December 31, 1917
- Preceded by: Denis M. Hurley
- Succeeded by: John J. Delaney
- Constituency: 2nd district (1899–1903); 7th district (1903–1917)

Personal details
- Born: March 10, 1872 Brooklyn, New York City, New York, U.S.
- Died: May 13, 1952 (aged 80) Brooklyn, New York City, New York, U.S.
- Party: Democratic

John Joseph Fitzgerald (March 10, 1872 – May 13, 1952) was an American lawyer and politician who served nine terms as a United States representative from New York from 1899 to 1917.

== Life and politics ==
Born in Brooklyn, he attended the public schools, La Salle Military Academy (formerly Sacred Heart Academy), and graduated from Manhattan College in 1891. He studied law in the New York Law School, was admitted to the bar in 1893 and commenced practice in New York City.

=== Political career ===
From 1900 to 1928 he was a delegate to each Democratic National Convention. Fitzgerald was also a trustee of Manhattan College.

=== Tenure in Congress ===
Fitzgerald was elected as a Democrat to the Fifty-Sixth and to the nine succeeding Congresses and held office from March 4, 1899, to December 31, 1917, when he resigned to resume the practice of law.

In the Sixty-Second through Sixty-Fifth Congresses he was chairman of the Committee on Appropriations.

=== Later career and death ===
In March 1932 he was appointed county judge of Kings County; he was elected in November 1932 and served until his retirement on December 31, 1942. He resumed the private practice of law and in 1952 died in Brooklyn; interment was in St. John's Cemetery, Middle Village, Queens.

U.S. House of Representatives
Preceded by Denis M. Hurley	Member of the U.S. House of Representatives from New York's 2nd congressional district 1899–1903	Succeeded by George H. Lindsay
Preceded by Montague Lessler	Member of the U.S. House of Representatives from New York's 7th congressional district 1903–1917	Succeeded by John J. Delaney
