= Abraham P. Stephens =

American politician (1796–1859)

- Born: February 18, 1796; Near New City, New York
- Died: November 25, 1859 (aged 63); Nyack, New York
- Resting place: Oak Hill Cemetery
- Occupation: Politician
- Predecessor: William Nelson
- Successor: William A. Walker
- Political party: Democratic

Abraham P. Stephens (February 18, 1796 – November 25, 1859) was an American businessman and politician who served one term as a U.S. representative from New York from 1851 to 1853.

== Biography ==
Born near New City, New York, Stephens was educated locally, owned a store near Rockland Lake and served as postmaster.

=== War of 1812 ===
During the War of 1812 he was a member of the New York Militia, attaining the rank of Corporal in Captain Theunis Cooper's Company of Colonel Benjamin J. Gurnee's Regiment, which served at Harlem Heights from September to December 1814.

=== Business career ===
Stephens was active in other businesses, including the Sing Sing and Rockland Lake Ferry Company. From 1825 to 1828 he was Sheriff of Rockland County. He was a Justice of the Peace and Chairman of the Rockland County Democratic Party.

=== Congress ===
Stephens was elected as a Democrat to the Thirty-second Congress (March 4, 1851 – March 3, 1853).

=== Death ===
He died in Nyack, New York, November 25, 1859. He was interred in Oak Hill Cemetery.

== Sources ==
- United States Congress. "Abraham P. Stephens (id: S000853)". Biographical Directory of the United States Congress.

U.S. House of Representatives
Preceded by William Nelson	Member of the U.S. House of Representatives from New York's 7th congressional district 1851–1853	Succeeded by William A. Walker
