= Northampton Law School =

Former law school in Northampton, MA USA

- Established: 1823-1829
- School type: Private law school
- Location: Northampton, Massachusetts, United States

Northampton Law School, sometimes called the Howe and Mills Law School, was a school for legal education and was located in Northampton, Massachusetts. Though open for only a few years in the 1820s, it produced several prominent alumni, including President Franklin Pierce.

== History ==
In 1823 Judge Samuel Howe (1785–1828) opened a law school in Northampton which was modeled on his alma mater, the Litchfield Law School. Howe operated the school from his law offices with the assistance of his partner Elijah H. Mills. In addition, Howe also enlisted the aid of local lawyer John H. Ashmun (the son of United States Senator Eli Porter Ashmun and brother of Congressman George Ashmun).

The school continued with Howe in the lead role until his death in 1828. When Mills decided to curtail his participation, Ashmun took on leadership of the school.

In 1829 Ashmun was appointed to a professorship at Harvard Law School. As a result, he closed the Northampton Law School, with many of his students following him to Harvard.

== Legacy ==
Among the prominent individuals who attended Northampton Law School during its short existence were:

- Franklin Pierce, President from 1853 to 1857
- George Stillman Hillard, United States Attorney for Massachusetts from 1866 to 1870 and husband of Howe's daughter Susan
- William A. Walker, United States Representative from New York
- Horatio Bridge, United States Navy officer during the American Civil War
- Edward Dickinson, United States Representative from Massachusetts and father of poet Emily Dickinson
- Epaphroditus Ransom, Governor of Michigan from 1848 to 1850

== See also ==
- List of defunct law schools in the United States
