= Montague Lessler =

American politician

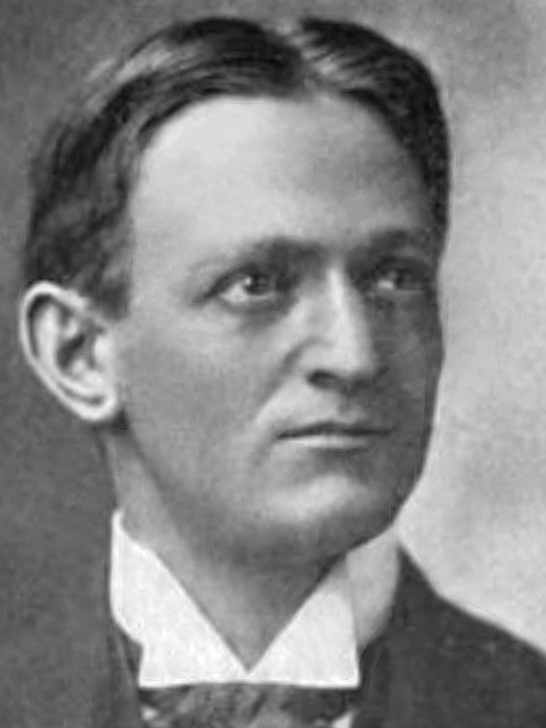

Member of the U.S. House of Representatives from New York's 7th district
- In office January 7, 1902 – March 3, 1903
- Preceded by: Nicholas Muller
- Succeeded by: John J. Fitzgerald

Personal details
- Born: January 1, 1869 New York City, New York, U.S.
- Died: February 17, 1938 (aged 69) New York City, New York, U.S.
- Party: Republican

Montague Lessler (January 1, 1869 – February 17, 1938) was an American lawyer and politician who served as a U.S. representative from New York.

Born in New York City, Lessler attended the public schools. He was graduated from the College of the City of New York in 1889 and later from the Columbia Law School. He was admitted to the bar in 1891 and commenced the practice of his profession in New York City.

Lessler was elected as a Republican to the Fifty-seventh Congress in a special election to fill the vacancy caused by the resignation of Nicholas Muller and served from January 7, 1902 to March 3, 1903.

He was an unsuccessful candidate for reelection in 1902 for a full term in the Fifty-eighth Congress.

He resumed the practice of law in New York City until his death there on February 17, 1938. His remains were cremated.

== See also ==
- List of Jewish members of the United States Congress

== Sources ==
- United States Congress. "Montague Lessler (id: L000253)". Biographical Directory of the United States Congress.

U.S. House of Representatives
Preceded by Nicholas Muller	Member of the U.S. House of Representatives from New York's 7th congressional district 1902–1903	Succeeded by John J. Fitzgerald
