= Rufus Palen =

American politician

Member of the U.S. House of Representatives from New York's 7th district
- In office March 4, 1839 – March 3, 1841
- Preceded by: John C. Brodhead
- Succeeded by: John Van Buren

Personal details
- Born: February 25, 1807 Palenville, New York, U.S.
- Died: April 26, 1844 (aged 37) New York City, New York
- Resting place: Old Cemetery, Palenville, New York
- Party: Whig
- Profession: Manufacturer; Politician

Rufus Palen (February 25, 1807 – April 26, 1844) was an American politician in the U.S. state of New York. He represented New York in the United States House of Representatives.

== Biography ==
Palen was born in Palenville, New York and moved with his family as a child to Fallsburg.

He held several political offices in New York, including postmaster of Palenville, and town board member, school supervisor, and district highway overseer for Fallsburg. He was elected as a Whig to the Twenty-sixth Congress, serving from March 4, 1839 – March 3, 1841.

Palen contracted tuberculosis during his term in Congress, and spent much of his time afterwards traveling outside the United States in an effort to improve his health. He died in New York City on April 26, 1844. He is buried in the Old Cemetery in Palenville, New York.

== Notes ==
U.S. House of Representatives
Preceded by John C. Brodhead	Member of the U.S. House of Representatives from New York's 7th congressional district 1839 - 1841	Succeeded by John Van Buren
