= New York's 7th congressional district =

U.S. House district for New York

- Interactive map of district boundaries since January 3, 2025
- Representative: Nydia Velázquez; D–Brooklyn
- Distribution: 100% urban; 0% rural
- Population (2025): 769,840
- Median household income: $100,362
- Ethnicity: 36.5% White; 35.9% Hispanic; 12.8% Asian; 9.7% Black; 3.4% Two or more races; 1.8% other
- Cook PVI: D+25

New York's 7th congressional district is a congressional district for the United States House of Representatives in New York City. It includes parts of Brooklyn and Queens. Democrat Nydia Velázquez represents the district in Congress. Velázquez has announced that she would not seek reelection in 2026.

Like many Congressional districts around the country, the New York Seventh's boundaries were drawn as to link disparate and widely separated neighborhoods with a large percentage of minority voters (see majority-minority districts). While no minority in the district constitutes an absolute majority, the boundaries group together heavily Puerto Rican neighborhoods in the New York City boroughs of Brooklyn and Queens with white, wealthier neighborhoods in the borough of Brooklyn. The district ranks fifth among the state's congressional districts in its poverty rate of 19.0 percent, per a 2026 congressional study.

The district includes the Queens neighborhoods of Long Island City, Astoria, Sunnyside, Maspeth, Ridgewood, and Woodhaven; the Brooklyn neighborhoods of Bushwick, Clinton Hill, Downtown Brooklyn, East New York, East Williamsburg, Fort Greene, Greenpoint, and Williamsburg. Much of the district is at the heart of the so-called "commie corridor," a colloquial nickname due to the progressive neighborhoods within the district.

Until 2012, the 7th consisted of parts of Northern Queens and Eastern portions of the Bronx. The Queens portion included the neighborhoods of College Point, East Elmhurst, Jackson Heights and Woodside. The Bronx portion of the district included the neighborhoods of Co-op City, Morris Park, Parkchester, Pelham Bay, and Throgs Neck as well as City Island. Until the latest redistricting in 2022, the 7th also included a portion of Manhattan's Lower East Side.

== Voter registration ==
Voter registration and party enrollment as of February 20, 2025
Party	Active voters	Inactive voters	Total voters	Percentage
Democratic	288,264	25,698	313,962	68.73%
Republican	32,793	2,278	35,071	7.68%
Working Families	2,509	172	2,681	0.59%
Conservative	1,326	86	1,412	0.31%
Other	5,521	607	6,128	1.34%
Unaffiliated	90,299	7,238	97,537	21.35%
Total	420,712	36,079	456,791	100%

== Recent election results from statewide races ==
Year	Office	Results
2008	President	Obama 83% - 17%
2012	President	Obama 88% - 12%
2016	President	Clinton 84% - 12%
2016	Senate	Schumer 87% - 9%
2018	Senate	Gillibrand 91% - 9%
2018	Governor	Cuomo 85% - 9%
2018	Attorney General	James 88% - 9%
2020	President	Biden 79% - 19%
2022	Senate	Schumer 80% - 20%
2022	Governor	Hochul 74% - 26%
2022	Attorney General	James 78% - 22%
2022	Comptroller	DiNapoli 78% - 22%
2024	President	Harris 72% - 26%
2024	Senate	Gillibrand 76% - 22%

== History ==
2023—:

Parts of Brooklyn and Queens

2013–2023:

Parts of Brooklyn, Manhattan and Queens

1993–2013:

Parts of Bronx, Queens

1953–1993:

Parts of Queens

1913–1953:

Parts of Brooklyn

Various New York districts have been numbered "7" over the years, including areas in New York City and various parts of upstate New York.

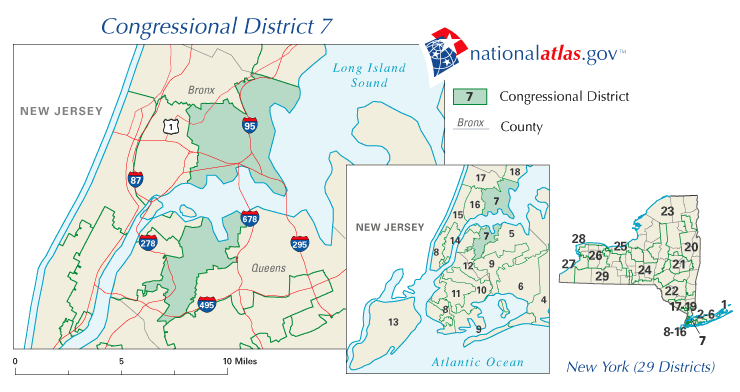
2003–2013

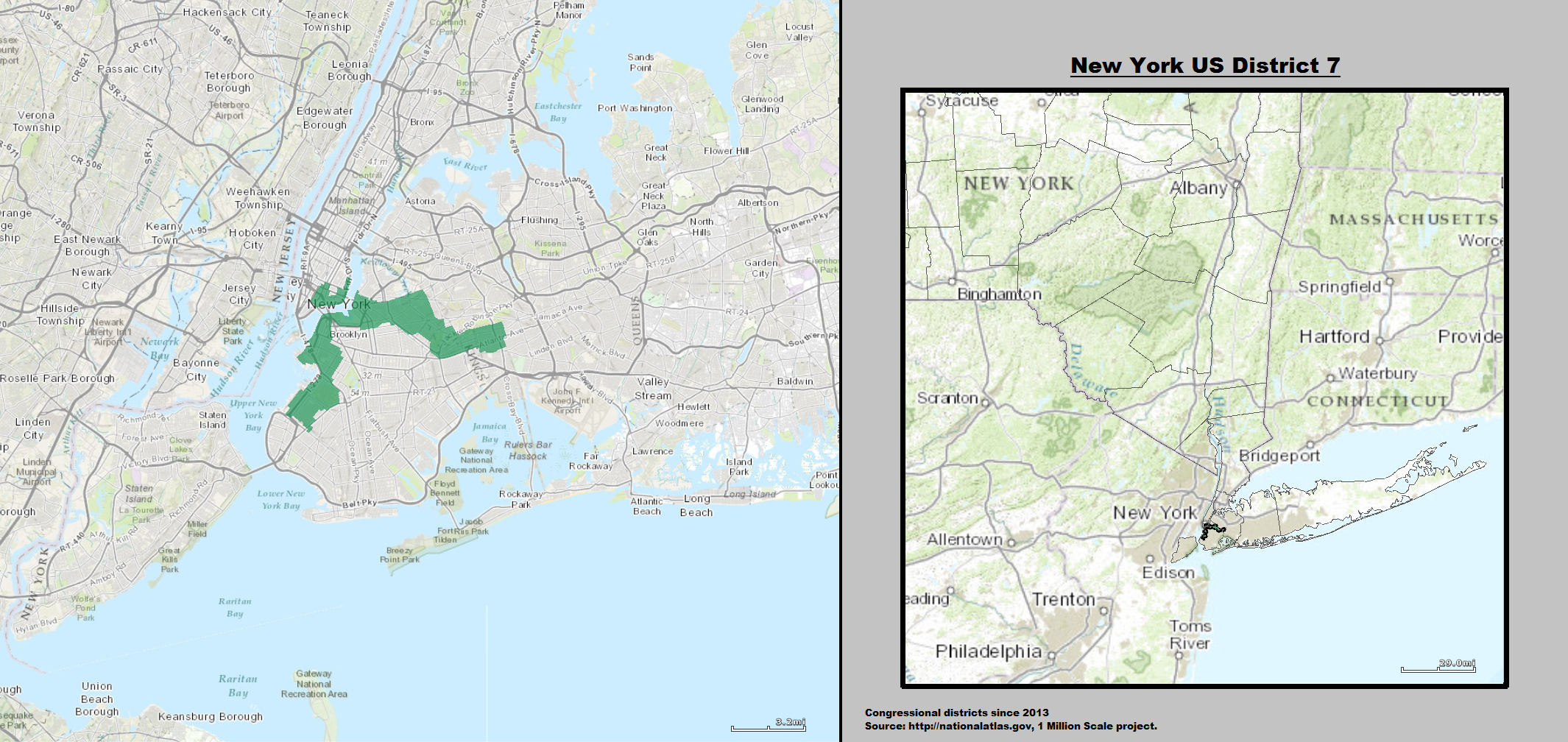
2013–2023

== Current composition ==
The 7th district is located entirely in the New York City boroughs of Brooklyn and Queens.

Brooklyn neighborhoods in the district include:

- Bushwick
- Clinton Hill
- Cypress Hills
- East Williamsburg
- Fort Greene
- Greenpoint
- South Williamsburg
- Williamsburg

Queens neighborhoods in the district include:

- Dutch Kills
- Glendale
- Hunters Point
- Long Island City
- Queensbridge
- Ravenswood
- Ridgewood
- Sunnyside
- Woodhaven

== List of members representing the district ==
The 7th District originally was the south Queens seat in the 1960s and 1970s (now the 6th District) and then became a central Queens seat (essentially the old 8th district) in the 1980s. Following the 1992 remap, much of the old 9th District was added. The 2002 remap placed much of the district in the Bronx, and it now resembles the 1970s era 10th District.

Member	Party	Years	Cong ress	Electoral history	District location
District established March 4, 1793
John E. Van Alen (Defreestville)	Pro-Administration	March 4, 1793 – March 3, 1795	3rd 4th 5th	Elected in 1793. Re-elected in 1794. Re-elected in 1796. Retired.	
John E. Van Alen (Defreestville)	Federalist	March 4, 1795 – March 3, 1799	3rd 4th 5th	Elected in 1793. Re-elected in 1794. Re-elected in 1796. Retired.	
John Thompson (Stillwater)	Democratic-Republican	March 4, 1799 – March 3, 1801	6th	Elected in 1798. Retired.	
David Thomas (Salem)	Democratic-Republican	March 4, 1801 – March 3, 1803	7th	Elected in 1800. Redistricted to the 12th district.	
Vacant		March 4, 1803 – October 17, 1803	8th	John Cantine was elected in 1802 but declined the seat.	
Josiah Hasbrouck (New Paltz)	Democratic-Republican	October 17, 1803 – March 3, 1805	8th	Elected April 26–28, 1803 to finish Cantine's term and seated October 17, 1803. [data missing]	
Martin G. Schuneman (Catskill)	Democratic-Republican	March 4, 1805 – March 3, 1807	9th	Elected in 1804. Retired.	
Barent Gardenier (Kingston)	Federalist	March 4, 1807 – March 3, 1809	10th	Re-elected in 1806. Redistricted to the 5th district.	
Killian K. Van Rensselaer (Albany)	Federalist	March 4, 1809 – March 3, 1811	11th	Redistricted from the 9th district and re-elected in 1808. [data missing]	
Harmanus Bleecker (Albany)	Federalist	March 4, 1811 – March 3, 1813	12th	Re-elected in 1810. Retired.	
Abraham J. Hasbrouck (Kingston)	Democratic-Republican	March 4, 1813 – March 3, 1815	13th	Elected in 1812. Retired.	
Samuel Betts (Newburgh)	Democratic-Republican	March 4, 1815 – March 3, 1817	14th	Re-elected in 1814. Retired.	
Josiah Hasbrouck (New Paltz)	Democratic-Republican	March 4, 1817 – March 3, 1819	15th	Elected in 1816. Retired.	
Jacob H. De Witt (Kingston)	Democratic-Republican	March 4, 1819 – March 3, 1821	16th	Elected in 1818. Retired.	
Vacant		March 4, 1821 – December 3, 1821	17th	Elections were held in April 1821. It is unclear when results were announced or credentials issued.	
Charles H. Ruggles (Kingston)	Federalist	December 3, 1821 – March 3, 1823	17th	Elected in 1821. Lost re-election.	
Lemuel Jenkins (Bloomingburg)	Democratic-Republican	March 4, 1823 – March 3, 1825	18th	Elected in 1822. Retired.	
Abraham Bruyn Hasbrouck (Kingston)	Anti-Jacksonian	March 4, 1825 – March 3, 1827	19th	Re-elected in 1824. Retired.	
George O. Belden (Monticello)	Jacksonian	March 4, 1827 – March 3, 1829	20th	Re-elected in 1826. Retired.	
Charles G. De Witt (Kingston)	Jacksonian	March 4, 1829 – March 3, 1831	21st	Re-elected in 1828. Retired.	
John C. Brodhead (Modena)	Jacksonian	March 4, 1831 – March 3, 1833	22nd	Elected in 1830. Retired.	
Charles Bodle (Bloomingburg)	Jacksonian	March 4, 1833 – March 3, 1835	23rd	Elected in 1832. Retired.	
Nicholas Sickles (Kingston)	Jacksonian	March 4, 1835 – March 3, 1837	24th	Elected in 1834. Retired.	
John C. Brodhead (Modena)	Democratic	March 4, 1837 – March 3, 1839	25th	Elected in 1836. Retired.	
Rufus Palen (Fallsburg)	Whig	March 4, 1839 – March 3, 1841	26th	Elected in 1838. Retired.	
John Van Buren (Kingston)	Democratic	March 4, 1841 – March 3, 1843	27th	Elected in 1840. Retired.	
Joseph H. Anderson (White Plains)	Democratic	March 4, 1843 – March 3, 1847	28th 29th	Elected in 1842. Re-elected in 1844. Retired.	
William Nelson (Peekskill)	Whig	March 4, 1847 – March 3, 1851	30th 31st	Elected in 1846. Re-elected in 1848. Retired.	
Abraham P. Stephens (Nyack)	Democratic	March 4, 1851 – March 3, 1853	32nd	Elected in 1850. Lost renomination.	
William A. Walker (New York)	Democratic	March 4, 1853 – March 3, 1855	33rd	Elected in 1852. Retired.	
Thomas Child Jr. (New York)	Whig	March 4, 1855 – March 3, 1857	34th	Elected in 1854. Never qualified or attended.	
Elijah Ward (New York)	Democratic	March 4, 1857 – March 3, 1859	35th	Elected in 1856. Lost re-election.	
George Briggs (New York)	Republican / Constitutional Union	March 4, 1859 – March 3, 1861	36th	Elected in 1858. Retired.	
Elijah Ward (New York)	Democratic	March 4, 1861 – March 3, 1863	37th	Elected in 1860. Redistricted to the 6th district.	
John W. Chanler (New York)	Democratic	March 4, 1863 – March 3, 1869	38th 39th 40th	Elected in 1862. Re-elected in 1864. Re-elected in 1866. Lost renomination.	
Hervey C. Calkin (New York)	Democratic	March 4, 1869 – March 3, 1871	41st	Elected in 1868. Retired.	
Smith Ely Jr. (New York)	Democratic	March 4, 1871 – March 3, 1873	42nd	Elected in 1870. Retired.	
Thomas J. Creamer (New York)	Democratic	March 4, 1873 – March 3, 1875	43rd	Elected in 1872. Retired.	
Smith Ely Jr. (New York)	Democratic	March 4, 1875 – December 11, 1876	44th	Elected in 1874. Resigned to become Mayor of New York City	
Vacant		December 11, 1876 – January 11, 1877	44th		
David Dudley Field II (New York)	Democratic	January 11, 1877 – March 3, 1877	44th	Elected to finish Ely's term. Had not been a candidate for the next term.	
Anthony Eickhoff (New York)	Democratic	March 4, 1877 – March 3, 1879	45th	Elected in 1876. Lost re-election.	
Edwin Einstein (New York)	Republican	March 4, 1879 – March 3, 1881	46th	Elected in 1878. Retired.	
P. Henry Dugro (New York)	Democratic	March 4, 1881 – March 3, 1883	47th	Elected in 1880. Retired.	
William Dorsheimer (New York)	Democratic	March 4, 1883 – March 3, 1885	48th	Elected in 1882. Retired.	
John J. Adams (New York)	Democratic	March 4, 1885 – March 3, 1887	49th	Redistricted from the 8th district and re-elected in 1884. Retired.	
Lloyd Bryce (New York)	Democratic	March 4, 1887 – March 3, 1889	50th	Elected in 1886. Lost re-election.	
Edward J. Dunphy (New York)	Democratic	March 4, 1889 – March 3, 1893	51st 52nd	Elected in 1888. Re-elected in 1890. Redistricted to the 8th district.	
Franklin Bartlett (New York)	Democratic	March 4, 1893 – March 3, 1897	53rd 54th	Elected in 1892. Re-elected in 1894. Lost re-election.	
John H.G. Vehslage (New York)	Democratic	March 4, 1897 – March 3, 1899	55th	Elected in 1896. Lost renomination.	
Nicholas Muller (New York)	Democratic	March 4, 1899 – November 22, 1901	56th 57th	Elected in 1898. Re-elected in 1900. Resigned.	
Vacant		November 22, 1901 – January 7, 1902	57th	[data missing]	
Montague Lessler (New York)	Republican	January 7, 1902 – March 3, 1903	57th	Elected to finish Muller's term. Lost re-election.	
John J. Fitzgerald (Brooklyn)	Democratic	March 4, 1903 – December 31, 1917	58th 59th 60th 61st 62nd 63rd 64th 65th	Redistricted from the 2nd district and re-elected in 1902. Re-elected in 1904. Re-elected in 1906. Re-elected in 1908. Re-elected in 1910. Re-elected in 1912. Re-elected in 1914. Re-elected in 1916. Resigned.	
Vacant		January 1, 1918 – March 5, 1918	65th		
John J. Delaney (Brooklyn)	Democratic	March 5, 1918 – March 3, 1919	65th	Elected to finish Fitzgerald's term. Retired.	
James P. Maher (Brooklyn)	Democratic	March 4, 1919 – March 3, 1921	66th	Redistricted from the 5th district and re-elected in 1918.[data missing]	
Michael J. Hogan (Brooklyn)	Republican	March 4, 1921 – March 3, 1923	67th	Elected in 1920. Lost re-election.	
John F. Quayle (Brooklyn)	Democratic	March 4, 1923 – November 27, 1930	68th 69th 70th 71st	Elected in 1922. Re-elected in 1924. Re-elected in 1926. Re-elected in 1928. Re-elected in 1930. Died.	
Vacant		November 27, 1930 – March 4, 1931	71st 72nd	[data missing]	
Matthew V. O'Malley (Brooklyn)	Democratic	March 4, 1931 – May 26, 1931	71st 72nd	Elected to finish Quayle's term. Died.	
Vacant		May 26, 1931 – November 3, 1931	71st 72nd		
John J. Delaney (Brooklyn)	Democratic	November 3, 1931 – November 18, 1948	72nd 73rd 74th 75th 76th 77th 78th 79th 80th	Elected to finish O'Malley's term. Re-elected in 1932. Re-elected in 1934. Re-elected in 1936. Re-elected in 1938. Re-elected in 1940. Re-elected in 1942. Re-elected in 1944. Re-elected in 1946. Re-elected in 1948. Died.	
Vacant		November 19, 1948 – February 14, 1949	80th 81st	[data missing]	
Louis B. Heller (Brooklyn)	Democratic	February 15, 1949 – January 3, 1953	81st 82nd	Elected to finish Delaney's term. Re-elected in 1950. Redistricted to the 8th district.	
James J. Delaney (Queens)	Democratic	January 3, 1953 – January 3, 1963	83rd 84th 85th 86th 87th	Redistricted from the 6th district and re-elected in 1952. Re-elected in 1954. Re-elected in 1956. Re-elected in 1958. Re-elected in 1960. Redistricted to the 9th district.	
Joseph P. Addabbo (Queens)	Democratic	January 3, 1963 – January 3, 1983	88th 89th 90th 91st 92nd 93rd 94th 95th 96th 97th	Redistricted from the 5th district and re-elected in 1962. Re-elected in 1964. Re-elected in 1966. Re-elected in 1968. Re-elected in 1970. Re-elected in 1972. Re-elected in 1974. Re-elected in 1976. Re-elected in 1978. Re-elected in 1980. Redistricted to the 6th district.	
Benjamin S. Rosenthal (Queens)	Democratic	January 3, 1983 – January 4, 1983	98th	Redistricted from the 8th district and re-elected in 1982. Died.	
Vacant		January 5, 1983 – February 28, 1983	98th	[data missing]	
Gary Ackerman (Queens)	Democratic	March 1, 1983 – January 3, 1993	98th 99th 100th 101st 102nd	Elected to finish Rosenthal's term. Re-elected in 1984. Re-elected in 1986. Re-elected in 1988. Re-elected in 1990. Redistricted to the 5th district.	
Thomas J. Manton (Queens)	Democratic	January 3, 1993 – January 3, 1999	103rd 104th 105th	Redistricted from the 9th district and re-elected in 1992. Re-elected in 1994. Re-elected in 1996. Retired.	1993–2003 [data missing]
Joseph Crowley (Queens)	Democratic	January 3, 1999 – January 3, 2013	106th 107th 108th 109th 110th 111th 112th	Elected in 1998. Re-elected in 2000. Re-elected in 2002. Re-elected in 2004. Re-elected in 2006. Re-elected in 2008. Re-elected in 2010. Redistricted to the 14th district.	1993–2003 [data missing]
Joseph Crowley (Queens)	Democratic	January 3, 1999 – January 3, 2013	106th 107th 108th 109th 110th 111th 112th	Elected in 1998. Re-elected in 2000. Re-elected in 2002. Re-elected in 2004. Re-elected in 2006. Re-elected in 2008. Re-elected in 2010. Redistricted to the 14th district.	2003–2013; Parts of Queens, The Bronx
Nydia Velázquez (Brooklyn)	Democratic	January 3, 2013 – present	113th 114th 115th 116th 117th 118th 119th	Redistricted from the 12th district and re-elected in 2012. Re-elected in 2014. Re-elected in 2016. Re-elected in 2018. Re-elected in 2020. Re-elected in 2022. Re-elected in 2024. Retiring at the end of term.	2013–2023; Parts of Brooklyn, Manhattan, Queens
Nydia Velázquez (Brooklyn)	Democratic	January 3, 2013 – present	113th 114th 115th 116th 117th 118th 119th	Redistricted from the 12th district and re-elected in 2012. Re-elected in 2014. Re-elected in 2016. Re-elected in 2018. Re-elected in 2020. Re-elected in 2022. Re-elected in 2024. Retiring at the end of term.	2023–2025; Parts of Brooklyn, Queens
Nydia Velázquez (Brooklyn)	Democratic	January 3, 2013 – present	113th 114th 115th 116th 117th 118th 119th	Redistricted from the 12th district and re-elected in 2012. Re-elected in 2014. Re-elected in 2016. Re-elected in 2018. Re-elected in 2020. Re-elected in 2022. Re-elected in 2024. Retiring at the end of term.	2025–present Parts of Brooklyn, Queens
Claire Valdez (Queens)	Democratic	Assuming office on January 3, 2027		Elected in 2026.	2025–present Parts of Brooklyn, Queens

== Election results ==
Note that in New York State electoral politics there are numerous minor parties at various points on the political spectrum. Certain parties will invariably endorse either the Republican or Democratic candidate for every office, hence the state electoral results contain both the party votes, and the final candidate votes (Listed as "Recap").

=== 1870 ===
US House election, 1870: New York District 7
Party	Candidate	Votes	%	±%
Democratic	Smith Ely, Jr.	12,464	74.2	
Republican	David Hunter McAlpin	3,403	20.3	
Tammany Republican	Benjamin A. Willis	929	5.5	
Majority		9.061	53.9	
Turnout		16,796	100	

=== 1984 ===
US House election, 1984: New York District 7
Party	Candidate	Votes	%	±%
Democratic	Gary L. Ackerman (incumbent)	97,674	69.3	
Republican	Gustave A. Reifenkugel	43,370	30.7	
Majority		54,304	38.6	
Turnout		131,044	100	

=== 1996 ===
US House election, 1996: New York District 7
Party	Candidate	Votes	%	±%
Democratic	Thomas J. Manton (incumbent)	78,848	71.1	
Republican	Rose Birtley	32,092	28.9	
Majority		46,756	42.1	
Turnout		110,940	100	

=== 1998 ===
US House election, 1998: New York District 7
Party	Candidate	Votes	%	±%
Democratic	Joseph Crowley	50,924	69.0	−2.1
Republican	James J. Dillon	18,896	25.6	−3.3
Conservative	Richard Rethco	3,960	5.4	+5.4
Majority		32,028	43.4	+1.3
Turnout		73,780	100	−33.5

=== 2000 ===
US House election, 2000: New York District 7
Party	Candidate	Votes	%	±%
Democratic	Joseph Crowley (incumbent)	78,207	71.5	+2.5
Republican	Rose Robles Birtley	24,592	22.5	−3.1
Conservative	Robert E. Hurley	3,131	2.9	−2.5
Green	Paul Gilman	1,999	1.8	+1.8
Right to Life	Garafalia Christea	1,172	1.1	+1.1
Majority		53,615	49.1	+5.7
Turnout		109,101	100	+47.9

=== 2002 ===
US House election, 2002: New York District 7
Party	Candidate	Votes	%	±%
Democratic	Joseph Crowley (incumbent)	50,967	73.3	+1.8
Republican	Kevin Brawley	18,572	26.7	+4.2
Majority		32,395	46.6	2.5
Turnout		69,539	100	−36.3

=== 2004 ===
US House election, 2004: New York District 7
Party	Candidate	Votes	%	±%
Democratic	Joseph Crowley (incumbent)	104,275	80.9	+7.6
Republican	Joseph Cinquemani	24,548	19.1	−7.6
Majority		79,727	61.9	+15.3
Turnout		128,823	100	+85.2

=== 2006 ===
US House election, 2006: New York District 7
Party	Candidate	Votes	%	±%
Democratic	Joe Crowley (incumbent)	63,997	84.0	+3.1
Republican	Kevin Brawley	12,220	16.0	−3.1
Majority		51,777	67.9	+6.0
Turnout		76,217	100	−40.8

=== 2008 ===
US House election, 2008: New York District 7
Party	Candidate	Votes	%	±%
Democratic	Joe Crowley (incumbent)	118,459	84.7	+0.7
Republican	William E. Britt, Jr.	21,477	15.3	−0.7
Majority		96,982	69.3	+1.4
Turnout		139,936	100	+83.6

=== 2010 ===
US House election, 2010: New York District 7
Party	Candidate	Votes	%	±%
Democratic	Joe Crowley (incumbent)	71,247	80.6	−4.1
Republican	Kenneth A. Reynolds	16,145	18.3	+3.0
Green	Anthony Gronowicz	1,038	1.1	+1.1
Majority		55,102	62.3	−7.0
Turnout		88,430	100	−36.8

=== 2012 ===
US House election, 2012: New York District 7
Party	Candidate	Votes	%
Democratic	Nydia Velázquez	134,802	88.8
Working Families	Nydia Velázquez	9,128	6.0
Total	Nydia Velázquez (incumbent)	143,930	94.8
Conservative	James Murray	7,971	5.2
Total votes		151,901	100.0
Democratic hold			

=== 2014 ===
US House election, 2014: New York District 7
Party	Candidate	Votes	%
Democratic	Nydia Velázquez	47,142	74.0
Working Families	Nydia Velázquez	9,451	14.8
Total	Nydia Velázquez (incumbent)	56,593	88.8
Republican	Jose Luis Fernandez	5,713	9.0
Conservative	Allan E. Romaguera	1,398	2.2
Total votes		63,704	100.0
Democratic hold			

=== 2016 ===
US House election, 2016: New York District 7
Party	Candidate	Votes	%
Democratic	Nydia Velázquez	165,819	87.4
Women's Equality	Nydia Velázquez	6,327	3.3
Total	Nydia Velázquez (incumbent)	172,146	90.8
Republican	Allan E. Romaguera	14,941	7.9
Conservative	Allan E. Romaguera	2,537	1.3
Total	Allan E. Romaguera	17,478	9.2
Total votes		189,624	100.0
Democratic hold			

=== 2018 ===
US House election, 2018: New York District 7
Party	Candidate	Votes	%
Democratic	Nydia Velázquez	134,125	85.4
Working Families	Nydia Velázquez	12,562	8.0
Total	Nydia Velázquez (incumbent)	146,687	93.4
Conservative	Joseph Lieberman	8,670	5.5
Reform	Jeffrey Kurzon	1,740	1.1
Total votes		157,097	100.0
Democratic hold			

=== 2020 ===
US House election, 2020: New York District 7
Party	Candidate	Votes	%
Democratic	Nydia Velázquez	156,889	69.7
Working Families	Nydia Velázquez	34,184	15.2
Total	Nydia Velázquez (incumbent)	191,073	84.9
Republican	Brian Kelly	29,404	13.1
Conservative	Brian Kelly	3,116	1.3
Total	Brian Kelly	32,520	14.4
Libertarian	Gilbert Midonnet	1,522	0.7
Total votes		225,115	100.0
Democratic hold			

=== 2022 ===
US House election, 2022: New York District 7
Party	Candidate	Votes	%
Democratic	Nydia Velázquez	95,645	64.5
Working Families	Nydia Velázquez	23,828	16.1
Total	Nydia Velázquez (incumbent)	119,473	80.6
Republican	Juan Pagan	26,351	17.8
Conservative	Juan Pagan	2,246	1.5
Total	Juan Pagan	28,597	19.3
Write-in		234	0.2
Total votes		148,304	100.0
Democratic hold			

=== 2024 ===
US House election, 2024: New York District 7
Party	Candidate	Votes	%
Democratic	Nydia Velázquez	145,141	65.6
Working Families	Nydia Velázquez	27,654	12.5
Total	Nydia Velázquez (incumbent)	172,795	78.1
Republican	William Kregler	43,052	19.5
Conservative	William Kregler	5,383	2.4
Total	William Kregler	48,435	21.9
Total votes		221,230	100.0
Democratic hold			

== See also ==
- List of United States congressional districts
- New York's congressional delegations
- New York's congressional districts
