= Matthew Vincent O'Malley =

American politician (1878–1931)

Matthew O'Malley
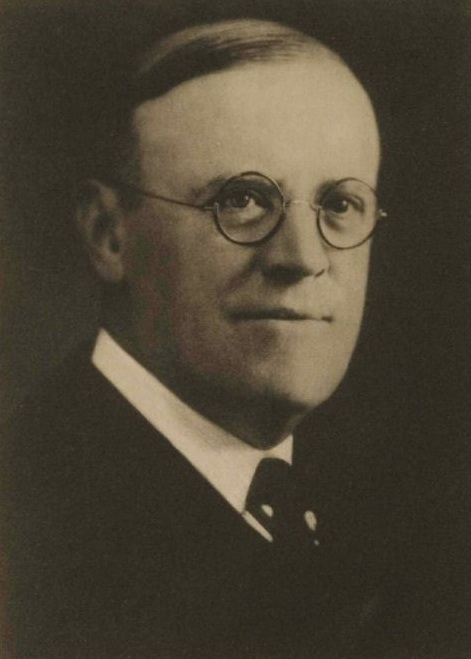

Member of the U.S. House of Representatives from New York's 7th district
- In office March 4, 1931 – May 26, 1931
- Preceded by: John F. Quayle
- Succeeded by: John J. Delaney

Personal details
- Born: Matthew Vincent O'Malley; June 26, 1878 New York City, U.S.
- Died: May 26, 1931 (aged 52) New York City, U.S.
- Party: Democratic

Matthew Vincent O'Malley (June 26, 1878 – May 26, 1931) was an American businessman and politician who was elected to serve as a U.S. representative from New York in 1930. He died in 1931, shortly after winning election, but before formally taking his seat.

== Early life and education ==
O'Malley was born in Brooklyn, New York, on June 26, 1878. He attended both parochial and public schools in Brooklyn, and worked as secretary to Brooklyn's public health officer.

== Career ==
O'Malley later became involved in the real estate, insurance and surety bond businesses, and was active in civic and business organizations including the Brooklyn Chamber of Commerce.

=== Election to Congress ===
In November 1930, Congressman John Quayle of New York's 7th congressional district died shortly after winning reelection to a fifth term, which was scheduled to begin on March 4, 1931. O'Malley ran as a Democrat and won the February 1931 special election held to select Quayle's replacement.

== Death ==
O'Malley died at his Brooklyn home on May 26, 1931. Because Congress was not in session at the time of his death, O'Malley never took his oath of office or exercised any of the duties of a Congressman. He was, nevertheless, serving in office from the beginning of his term on March 4, 1931. In 1932, Congress voted to pay the salaries of several deceased House members to their next of kin. O'Malley was included, and his mother received $10,000.

He was buried in Brooklyn's Holy Cross Cemetery.

== See also ==
- List of United States representatives-elect who never took their seats

U.S. House of Representatives
Preceded by John F. Quayle	Member of the U.S. House of Representatives from New York's 7th congressional district 1931	Succeeded by John J. Delaney
