= John Van Buren (congressman) =

American politician

Member of the U.S. House of Representatives from New York's 7th district
- In office March 4, 1841 – March 3, 1843
- Preceded by: Rufus Palen
- Succeeded by: Joseph H. Anderson

District Attorney of Ulster County, New York
- In office 1846–1850
- Preceded by: Willet Linderman
- Succeeded by: Robert F. Macauley

County Court Judge of Ulster County, New York
- In office 1836–1841
- Preceded by: Abraham D. Soper
- Succeeded by: James C. Forsyth

Member of the New York State Assembly from the Ulster County District
- In office 1831–1832 Serving with John J. Schoonmaker
- Preceded by: Matthew Oliver; Green Miller
- Succeeded by: Leonard Hardenbergh; Heman Landon

Personal details
- Born: May 13, 1799 Kingston, New York, U.S.
- Died: January 16, 1855 (aged 55) Kingston, New York, U.S.
- Resting place: Sharp Burial Ground; Kingston, New York
- Party: Democratic
- Spouse: Laura Amelia Hardy Van Buren
- Children: Daniel Tompkins Van Buren; Persen Van Buren
- Parent(s): Cornelius Van Buren; Elisabeth (Persen) Van Buren
- Education: Union College
- Profession: Attorney, politician

John Van Buren (May 13, 1799 – January 16, 1855) was an American attorney and politician in the U.S. state of New York. He represented New York in the United States House of Representatives and New York State Assembly in addition to serving terms as county judge and district attorney of Ulster County.

Born and educated in Kingston, Van Buren graduated from Union College, studied law, and attained admission to the bar. In addition to practicing in Kingston, Van Buren became active in the Democratic Party. The offices he held included member of the New York State Assembly (1831–1832), Judge of Ulster County (1836–1841), member of the United States House of Representatives (1841–1843), and Ulster County District Attorney (1846–1850).

Van Buren was ill for the last three months of his life. He died in Kingston, and was buried at Sharp Burial Ground in Kingston.

== Early life ==
Van Buren was born in Kingston, New York, the son of Cornelius Van Buren and Elisabeth (Persen) Van Buren. He graduated from Union College in 1818, studied law with Charles H. Ruggles, was admitted to the bar, and began to practice in Kingston.

== Political career ==
He held many different political positions in New York, and in 1831 was a member of the New York State Assembly representing Ulster County in the 54th New York State Legislature. Van Buren was Judge of Ulster County from 1836 to 1841. He was elected as a Democrat to the 27th United States Congress, holding office from March 4, 1841, to March 3, 1843. While in Congress, he was Chairman of the Committee on Expenditures in the Department of State. After leaving Congress he resumed the practice of law and served as Ulster County District Attorney from 1846 to 1850.

Van Buren died in Kingston on January 16, 1855 and is interred at Sharp Burial Ground in Kingston.

=== The other John Van Buren ===
Van Buren is sometimes confused with John Van Buren, the son of President Martin Van Buren. President Van Buren's son was born in 1810 and died in 1866. John Van Buren of Kingston was born in 1799 and died in 1855. While both John Van Burens were active in New York's Democratic Party, President Van Buren's son never lived in Kingston, served as a Judge, or was elected to Congress.

== Family ==
Van Buren and his wife Laura Amelia Hardy (1800–1874) had two children, Daniel Tompkins Van Buren (1826–1890) and Persen Van Buren (1842–1852).

Daniel Tompkins Van Buren was an 1847 graduate of the United States Military Academy who served in the Mexican–American War and the American Civil War, and attained the rank of brigadier general by brevet as a member of the Union Army.

U.S. House of Representatives
Preceded by Rufus Palen	Member of the U.S. House of Representatives from New York's 7th congressional district 1841–1843	Succeeded by Joseph H. Anderson
