= John Quayle (politician) =

American politician (1868–1930)

John F. Quayle
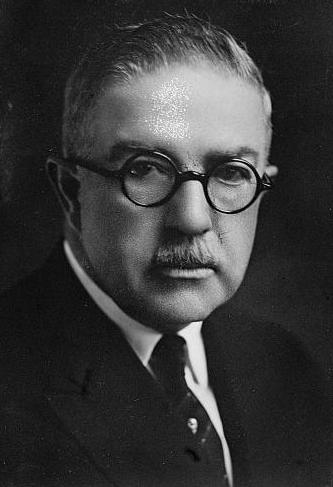

Member of the U.S. House of Representatives from New York's 7th district
- In office March 4, 1923 – November 27, 1930
- Preceded by: Michael J. Hogan
- Succeeded by: John J. Delaney

Personal details
- Born: December 1, 1868 Brooklyn, New York, USA
- Died: November 27, 1930 (aged 61) Brooklyn, New York, USA
- Resting place: St. John Cemetery, Queens, New York
- Party: Democratic
- Education: St. Francis College
- Profession: Butcher; Construction company owner Public official

John Francis Quayle (December 1, 1868 – November 27, 1930) was an American businessman and politician from Brooklyn, New York. He was most notable for his service as a U.S. congressman representing the 7th district of New York in the United States House of Representatives for four terms, serving from 1923 to 1930.

== Early life ==
John Francis Quayle was born in Brooklyn, New York on December 1, 1868. He attended local schools, St. James Academy, and Brooklyn's St. Francis College.

== Start of career ==
Quayle operated a retail butcher business, and later became involved in the construction industry as a homebuilder. He became active in politics as a Democratic, most notably as a member of Brooklyn's Third Ward Democratic Club.

In 1914 Quayle was appointed Deputy Collector of Internal Revenue for New York's first district, and he served until 1919. In addition, during the administration of Mayor John Francis Hylan, Quayle served as secretary to Frank Mann, deputy commissioner of New York City's Tenement House Department.

In 1918, Quayle was chosen as leader of the Democratic organization in part of Brooklyn's 1st District in the New York State Assembly, and he was a member of the executive committee of the Kings County Democratic Party. From 1919 to 1923 Quayle was deputy city clerk of New York City, with responsibility for the city clerk's operations in Brooklyn. In 1920, he served as an Alternate Delegate to the Democratic National Convention.

== Member of Congress ==
In 1922 Quayle was the successful Democratic nominee for a seat in Congress. He was reelected three times and served from March 4, 1923, until his death on November 27, 1930. In Congress, Quayle was active on the Naval Affairs Committee, and worked to effect improvements to the Brooklyn Navy Yard.

Because of his death after the 1930 elections and before the start of the 72nd Congress in 1931, Quayle did not serve the final term to which he had been elected. The February 1931 special election to succeed him was won by Matthew Vincent O'Malley, but O'Malley died in May before being sworn in. The seat remained vacant until John J. Delaney was elected in November 1931.

== Death and burial ==
Quayle died in Brooklyn on November 27, 1930. He was buried at St. John Cemetery in Queens, New York.

== Family ==
Quayle was married to Kathryn (Sullivan) Quayle. They were the parents of daughter Kathryn, and sons William J. and John F. Jr.

== See also ==
- List of members of the United States Congress who died in office (1900–1949)

== Sources ==
=== Books ===
- U.S. House of Representatives (1931). John F. Quayle, Late a Representative from New York. Washington, DC: U.S. Government Printing Office – via Genealogy Bank.com.

=== Newspapers ===
- "Death Notice, John F. Quayle". Brooklyn Daily Eagle. Brooklyn, NY. November 28, 1930 – via Newspapers.com.
- "Quayle Funeral Services to be Held on Monday". Brooklyn Daily Eagle. Brooklyn, NY. November 28, 1930 – via Newspapers.com.
- "M. J. O'Malley, Congressman-elect, is Dead". Brooklyn Daily Eagle. Brooklyn, NY. May 26, 1931 – via Newspapers.com.
- "J. J. Delaney Regains Former Seat in House". Poughkeepsie Eagle-News. Poughkeepsie, NY. Associated Press. November 4, 1931 – via Newspapers.com.

U.S. House of Representatives
Preceded by Michael J. Hogan	Member of the U.S. House of Representatives from New York's 7th congressional district 1923–1930	Succeeded by John J. Delaney
