= Nicholas Sickles =

American politician

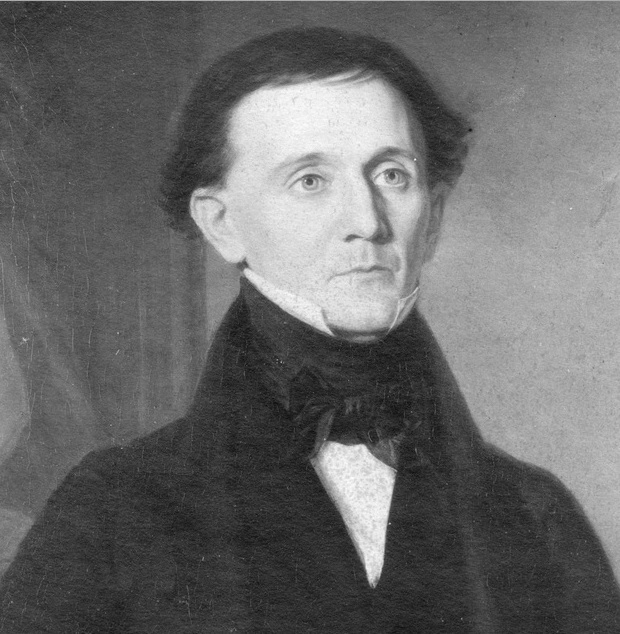

Member of the U.S. House of Representatives from New York's 7th district
- In office March 4, 1835 – March 3, 1837
- Preceded by: Charles Bodle
- Succeeded by: John C. Brodhead

Personal details
- Born: September 11, 1801 Kinderhook, New York, U.S.
- Died: May 13, 1845 (aged 43) Kinderhook, New York, U.S.
- Resting place: Houghtaling Burying Ground; Kingston, New York
- Party: Jacksonian
- Education: Kinderhook Academy
- Profession: Attorney; Politician

Nicholas Sickles (September 11, 1801 – May 13, 1845) was an American attorney and politician in the U.S. state of New York. From 1835 to 1837, he represented New York in the United States House of Representatives for one term.

== Biography ==
Sickles was born in Kinderhook, New York. He attended private schools and Kinderhook Academy before studying law. He was admitted to the bar in 1823 and commenced practice in Kingston, New York.

=== Congress ===
He was elected as a Jacksonian candidate to the Twenty-fourth Congress, serving from December 7, 1835, to March 3, 1837.

=== Later career and death ===
After leaving Congress, he served as prosecuting attorney of Ulster County, New York in 1836 and 1837. Sickles served as surrogate of Ulster County from January 1, 1844, until his death in Kingston, New York on May 13, 1845. He is interred in Houghtaling Burying Ground in Kingston.

== Notes ==
U.S. House of Representatives
| Preceded by Charles Bodle | Member of the U.S. House of Representatives from New York's 7th congressional district 1835 - 1837 | Succeeded by John C. Brodhead |
