= John J. Delaney =

American politician (1878–1948)

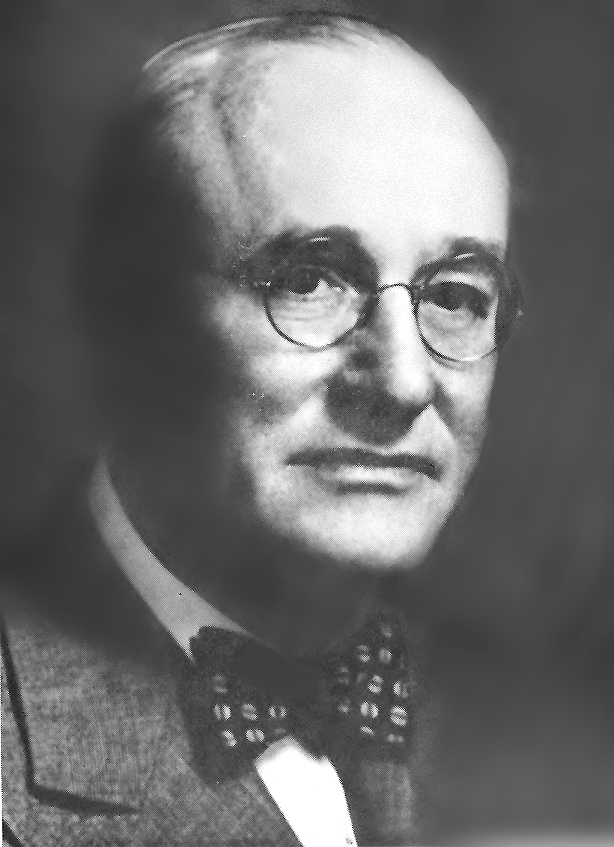

Member of the U.S. House of Representatives from New York's 7th district
- In office November 3, 1931 – November 18, 1948
- Preceded by: John Quayle
- Succeeded by: Louis B. Heller
- In office March 5, 1918 – March 3, 1919
- Preceded by: John J. Fitzgerald
- Succeeded by: James P. Maher

Personal details
- Born: August 21, 1878 Brooklyn, New York, U.S.
- Died: November 18, 1948 (aged 70) Brooklyn, New York, U.S.
- Resting place: Holy Cross Cemetery, Brooklyn, New York
- Party: Democratic
- Spouse: Lotti S. Borchert (m. 1925–1948, his death)
- Children: 2
- Education: Manhattan College; Brooklyn Law School
- Profession: Attorney

John Joseph Delaney (August 21, 1878 – November 18, 1948) was an American lawyer and politician who served ten terms as a United States representative from New York from 1918 to 1919, and then from 1931 to 1948. He was elected to an 11th term in 1948 but died shortly after the election.

== Early life and career ==
Delaney was born in Brooklyn, he attended St. Ann's Parochial School and St. James' Academy in Brooklyn and Manhattan College. He engaged in the diamond business in 1897, was graduated from the Brooklyn Law School of St. Lawrence University in 1914, was admitted to the bar in 1915 and commenced practice in New York City.

=== First term in Congress ===
Delaney was elected as a Democrat to the Sixty-fifth Congress, by special election, to fill the vacancy caused by the resignation of Representative John J. Fitzgerald, and held office from March 5, 1918, to March 3, 1919.

=== New York public official ===
He declined to be a candidate for renomination in 1918 and resumed his former business pursuits. He was a delegate to the Democratic State conventions in 1922 and 1924 and was deputy Commissioner of Public Markets of New York City from 1924 to 1931.

=== Return to Congress ===
He was again elected as a Democrat to the House of Representatives, this time to the Seventy-second Congress, to fill the vacancy caused by the death of Representative-elect Matthew V. O'Malley.

=== Death ===
Delaney was reelected to the eight succeeding Congresses, holding office from November 3, 1931, to November 18, 1948. He was reelected in 1948 to the Eighty-first Congress but died on November 18, 1948, in Brooklyn.

Interment was in Holy Cross Cemetery.

== See also ==
- List of members of the United States Congress who died in office (1900–1949)

U.S. House of Representatives
Preceded by John J. Fitzgerald	Member of the U.S. House of Representatives from New York's 7th congressional district 1918–1919	Succeeded by James P. Maher
Preceded by John F. Quayle	Member of the U.S. House of Representatives from New York's 7th congressional district 1931–1948	Succeeded by Louis B. Heller
Political offices
Preceded by Blanche Irene Welzmiller	Deputy Commissioner of Public Markets for New York City; 1924–1931	Succeeded by James A. Bell
