= Daniel Tompkins Van Buren =

American military officer and engineer

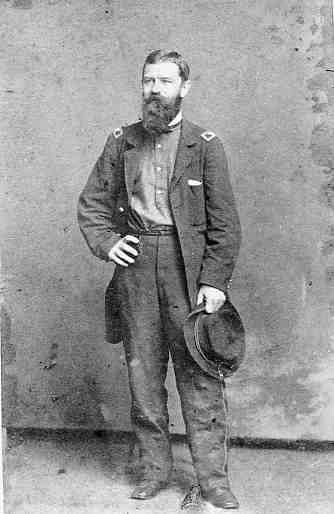
- Van Buren as a Union Army colonel, circa 1862. Seward R. Osborne Collection.
- Born: January 15, 1826; Kingston, New York
- Died: July 16, 1890 (aged 64); Plainfield, New Jersey
- Burial place: Green-Wood Cemetery, Brooklyn, New York
- Spouse: Julia (Morris) Van Buren (1833–1915) (m. 1863)
- Relatives: 4 children John Van Buren (father)
- Military career
- Allegiance: United States; Union
- Branch: United States Army; New York Militia; Union Army
- Service years: 1847–1855 (U.S. Army); 1858–1861 (Militia); 1861–1865 (Union Army)
- Rank: First Lieutenant (U.S. Army); Colonel (Militia); Brigadier General (Brevet) (Union Army)
- Units: 2nd Artillery Regiment; Faculty, United States Military Academy; Office of Coast Survey; 3rd Division, New York Militia: Union Army; 20th New York Volunteer Infantry Regiment; Department of Maryland; Department of Pennsylvania; Dix's Division, Army of the Potomac; Middle District; VII Army Corps; Department of the East
- Conflicts: Mexican–American War; American Civil War
- Other work: Attorney; Engineer

Daniel Tompkins Van Buren (January 15, 1826 – July 16, 1890) was an American military officer and engineer. He attained the rank of brigadier general by brevet as a member of the Union Army during the American Civil War.

Born in Kingston, New York and the son of Congressman and Judge John Van Buren, Daniel Van Buren was educated in Kingston, and graduated from the United States Military Academy in 1847. He served in the Mexican–American War, and remained on duty until resigning after his father's death in 1855. Returning to Kingston to administer his father's estate, Van Buren studied law, attained admission to the bar, and practiced. In addition, he worked as an engineer and surveyor, and served as an engineer officer in the state militia.

Van Buren returned to the Army for the American Civil War, serving primarily as chief of staff to John Adams Dix as Dix carried out a series of senior commands; Van Buren advanced through the ranks to colonel, and received a brevet promotion to brigadier general in recognition of his superior service during the war.

After the war, Van Buren worked as an engineer and surveyor, first in Kingston, and later in Plainfield, New Jersey. He died in Plainfield, and was buried at Green-Wood Cemetery in Brooklyn.

== Early life ==
Daniel T. Van Buren was born in Kingston, New York on January 15, 1826; his mother was Laura Hardy Van Buren (1800-1874), and his father was John Van Buren (1799-1855), a Kingston attorney and judge who served terms in the New York State Assembly and United States House of Representatives.

Van Buren was educated in Kingston and graduated from Kingston Academy. In 1843 he began attendance at the United States Military Academy; he graduated in 1847 ranked 6th of 38 in his class, and was commissioned as a second lieutenant in the artillery corps.

== Start of career ==
After receiving his commission, Van Buren was appointed to the 2nd Artillery Regiment. He took part in the Mexican–American War, including the Battle for Mexico City and the occupation of the city after the war. Van Buren was promoted to first lieutenant in 1849.

Following his service in Mexico, Van Buren was appointed to the West Point faculty as an assistant professor of natural philosophy and experimental philosophy. He remained at West Point until being reassigned in 1852. Van Buren's next posting was with the Office of Coast Survey, where he took part in topographical surveys and map making duties at several U.S. ports.

In 1855, John Van Buren died; Daniel Van Buren left the Army in order to return to Kingston and administer his father's estate. While in Kingston, he studied law, attained admission to the bar, and began to practice. He also carried out an appointment as Ulster County's civil engineer and surveyor. In 1858, he was commissioned as a colonel in the New York Militia, and appointed as engineer officer of the militia's 3rd Division.

== American Civil War ==
After the American Civil War started in early 1861, the New York Militia's 20th Infantry Regiment was among the units mobilized for three months' service; Van Buren joined as regimental engineer officer with the rank of captain, and served in and around Annapolis Maryland until the regiment's demobilization that Summer. Van Buren remained on active duty after the 20th Regiment completed its initial period of service, and in August 1861 he joined the staff of John Adams Dix, then a major general, who commanded the Departments of Maryland and Pennsylvania. Initially assigned as Dix's adjutant and chief of staff with the rank of major, Van Buren was promoted to lieutenant colonel later that month; in June 1862, he was promoted to colonel an assigned as Dix's aide-de-camp.

Van Buren remained with Dix as Dix successively commanded a division of the Army of the Potomac, the Middle District (headquartered in Baltimore), the VII Army Corps, and the Department of the East. He later served as assistant adjutant of the Department of the East under Joseph Hooker, and in March 1865 he was promoted to brigadier general by brevet in recognition of his superior service during the war. After the war, Van Buren was active in the Military Order of the Loyal Legion of the United States.

== Later career ==
Following his Civil War service, Van Buren worked as a surveyor and civil engineer, first in Kingston, and later in Plainfield, New Jersey. He was also active in several business ventures, including a bluestone quarry near Kingston, which he leased to various operators, and which was the source for many of the paving stones used in New York City in the mid to late 1800s.

== Death and burial ==
Van Buren died in Plainfield on July 16, 1890. He was buried in Brooklyn's Green-Wood Cemetery, Section 175, Lot 26671.

== Family ==
In August 1863, Van Buren married Julia Morris (1833–1915); Julia Morris was the daughter of Lucretia (Crary) Morris (1803–1881) and James Ludlum Morris (1796–1878), an officer in the United States Navy. Richard Moris (1730–1810) was her great-grandfather. Daniel and Julia Van Buren were the parents of:

- Edward Morris Van Buren (1865–1935), who married Caroline Reinhart, the daughter of railroad president Joseph Reinhart
- Francis Persen Van Buren (1868–1889) (He was a student at Rutgers College when he died as the result of injuries he sustained when he was thrown from a horse)
- Laurens Hardy Van Buren (1871–1932), who married Ruby Kieb of Fanwood, New Jersey (His first name is sometimes spelled "Lawrence")
- Julian Tompkins Van Buren (1874–1879)

== Sources ==
=== Books ===
- Association of Graduates of United States Military Academy (1890). Twenty-First Annual Reunion Proceedings. Saginaw, MI: Evening News printing and Binding House.
- Nicholson, John P. (1902). Register of the Pennsylvania Commandery, Military Order of the Loyal Legion of the United States, April 15, 1865-September 1, 1902. Philadelphia, PA: Commandery of the State of Pennsylvania.
- The Saint Nicholas Society of the City of New York (1934). The Saint Nicholas Society of the City of New York: History, Customs, Record of Events, Constitution, Certain Genealogies, and Other Matters of Interest. Vol. IV. New York, NY: Saint Nicholas Society of the City of New York.

=== Newspapers ===
- "Death of Francis P. Van Buren" (PDF). Plainfield Daily Press. Plainfield, NJ. April 26, 1889.
- "Married in Church: Edward Morris Van Buren Weds Miss Caroline Reinhart at Plainfield". The Times. Philadelphia, PA. October 24, 1895 – via Newspapers.com.
- "May Wedding at Grace Church". The Courier-News. Bridgewater, NJ. May 14, 1906 – via Newspapers.com.

=== Magazines ===
- Meyer, Henry C. (July 19, 1890). "Death Notice, Brigadier General Daniel T. Van Buren". The Engineering and Building Record and Sanitary Engineer. New York, NY: H. C. Meyer.
- Munn, O. D. (November 22, 1890). "Bluestone Sidewalks". Scientific American. New York, NY: Munn & Co.

=== Internet ===
- Green-Wood Cemetery (7 April 2015). "Biography, Daniel Tompkins Van Buren". Civil War Biographies: Vail-Walsh. Brooklyn, NY: Green-Wood Historic Fund.
