= Gerald Celente =

American trend forecaster

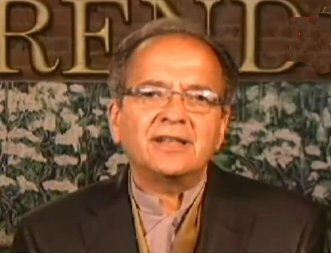
- Born: November 29, 1946 (age 79); The Bronx, New York City, New York, U.S.
- Occupation: Trend forecaster

Gerald Celente (born November 29, 1946) is an American trend forecaster, publisher of the Trends Journal, business consultant and author who makes predictions about the global financial markets and other important events.

== Background ==
Celente was born in an Italian American family in The Bronx, New York City, New York. He had early political experience running a mayoral campaign in Yonkers, New York, and served as executive assistant to the secretary of the New York State Senate.

From 1973 to 1979, Celente traveled between the major US cities of Chicago, Illinois and the United States capital, Washington, D.C. as a government affairs specialist. In 1980, Celente founded The Trends Research Institute (at first called the Socio-Economic Research Institute of America), now located in Kingston, New York, publisher of the Trends Journal which forecasts and analyzes business, socioeconomic, political, and other trends.

== Forecasting ==
His forecasts since the 1980s have included the 1987 Black Monday stock market crash, the dot-com bubble, and the 2008 financial crisis. More recent forecasts involve fascism in the United States, food riots and tax revolts. Celente has long predicted global anti-Americanism, a failing economy and immigration woes in the U.S.

Over the years, he has made recurring guest appearances on major television news networks, including CNN, MSNBC, Fox News, and ABC News, and has been featured on programs hosted by popular figures such as Oprah Winfrey and Judge Andrew Napolitano. He has described himself as a political atheist, distancing himself from both parties, which he views as different faces of the same underlying problem.

Robert Kiyosaki has called the Trends Journal a publication that can change the way readers see the world and a great investment. Celente’s work has also been praised by other prominent figures in finance and media, including Peter Schiff and Max Keiser.

In April 2009 Celente wrote, "Wall Street controls our financial lives; the media manipulates our minds. These systems cannot be changed from within. There is no alternative. Without a revolution, these institutions will bankrupt the country, keep fighting failed wars, start new ones, and hold us in perpetual intellectual subjugation."

Celente has said, "smaller communities, the smaller groups, the smaller states, the more self-sustaining communities, will 'weather the crisis in style' as big cities and hypertrophic suburbias descend into misery and conflict", and forecasts "a downsizing of America".

== Publications ==
- Trend Tracking: The System to Profit from Today's Trends (1991), ISBN 978-0446392877
