= 64th United States Congress =

1915-1917 U.S. Congress

←	63rd	65th	→
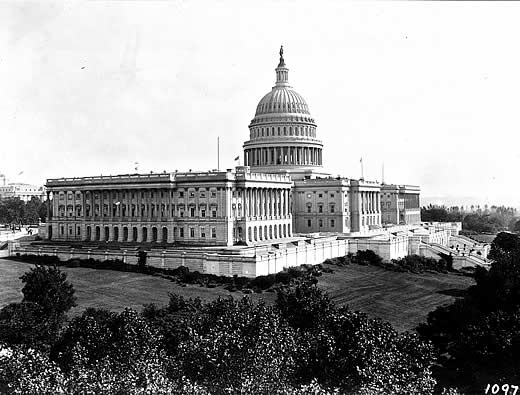
- United States Capitol (1906)

Overview
- Legislative body: United States Congress
- Jurisdiction: United States
- Term: March 4, 1915 – March 4, 1917

Senate
- Members: 96
- President: Thomas R. Marshall (D)
- President pro tempore: James Clarke (D); Willard Saulsbury Jr. (D)
- Party control: Democratic

House of Representatives
- Members: 435 representatives 5 non-voting delegates
- Speaker: Champ Clark (D)
- Party control: Democratic

Sessions
- 1st: December 6, 1915 – September 8, 1916
- 2nd: December 4, 1916 – March 3, 1917 (lame duck)

The 64th United States Congress was a meeting of the legislative branch of the United States federal government, composed of the United States Senate and the United States House of Representatives. It met in Washington, D.C., from March 4, 1915, to March 4, 1917, during the third and fourth years of Woodrow Wilson's presidency. The apportionment of seats in the House of Representatives was based on the 1910 United States census.

The Democrats maintained a majority in both chambers (albeit reduced in the House) and, along with President Wilson, also maintained an overall federal government trifecta.

== Major events ==
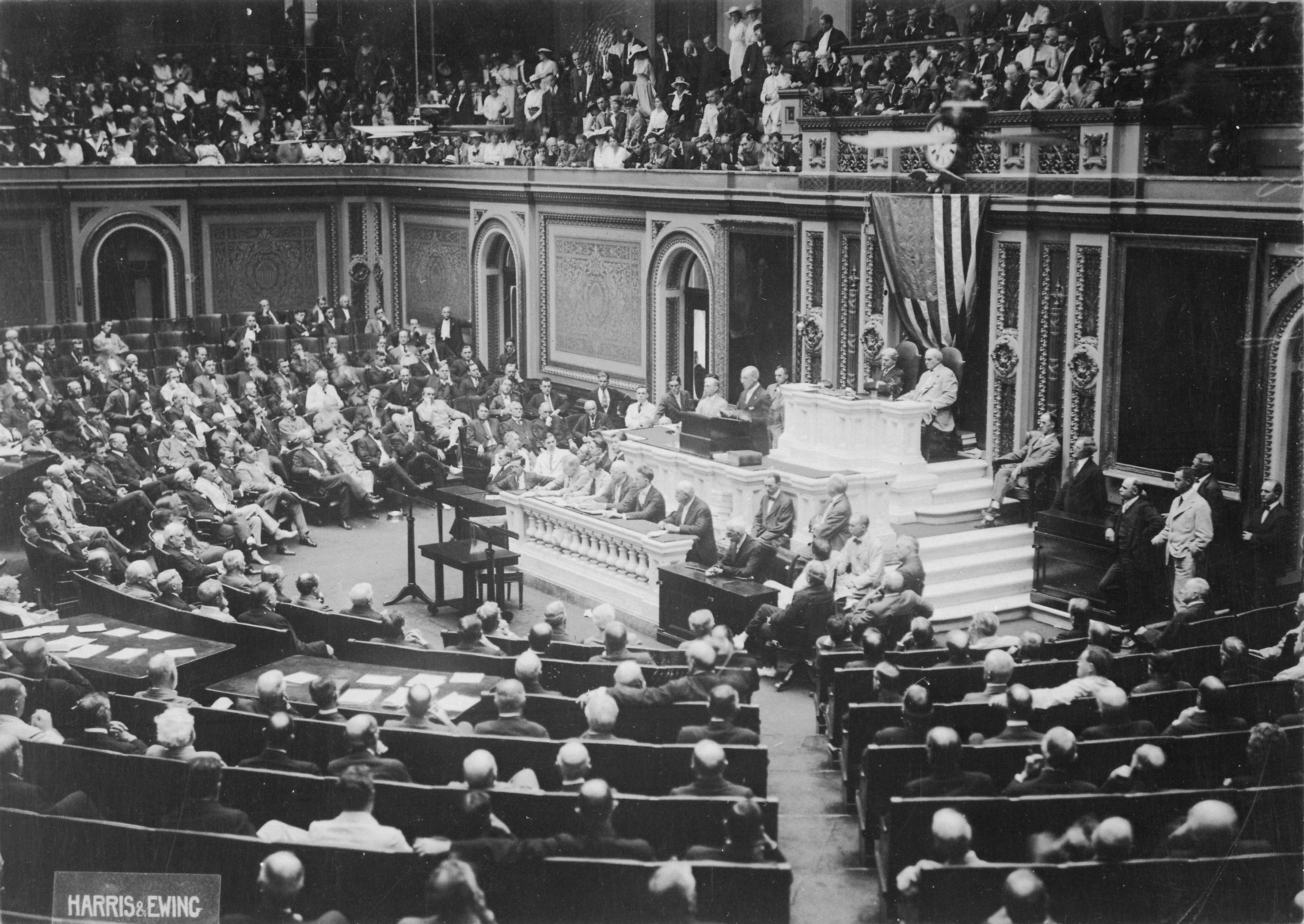
President Wilson before Congress, announcing the break in the official relations with Germany. February 3, 1917.

- June 9, 1915 (Prelude to World War I): U.S. Secretary of State William Jennings Bryan resigned over a disagreement regarding the nation's handling of the RMS Lusitania sinking.
- July 24, 1915: The steamer SS Eastland capsized in central Chicago, with the loss of 844 lives.
- July 28, 1915: The United States occupation of Haiti began.
- August 5–August 23, 1915: Hurricane Two of the 1915 Atlantic hurricane season over Galveston and New Orleans left 275 dead.
- March 8–March 9, 1916: Mexican Revolution: Pancho Villa led about 500 Mexican raiders in an attack against Columbus, New Mexico, killing 12 U.S. soldiers. A garrison of the U.S. 13th Cavalry Regiment fights back and drives them away.
- March 15, 1916: President Woodrow Wilson sent 12,000 United States troops over the U.S.-Mexico border to pursue Pancho Villa.
- May 5, 1916: United States Marines invaded and started the occupation of the Dominican Republic.
- July 30, 1916: German agents caused the Black Tom explosion in Jersey City, New Jersey, an act of sabotage destroying an ammunition depot and killing at least seven people.
- November 7, 1916: U.S. presidential election, 1916: Democratic President Woodrow Wilson narrowly defeated Republican Charles E. Hughes.
- January 11, 1917 (Prelude to World War I): German saboteurs set off the Kingsland explosion at Kingsland, New Jersey (now Lyndhurst, New Jersey), one of the events leading to U.S. involvement in World War I.
- February 3, 1917 (Prelude to World War I): The United States severs diplomatic relations with Germany

== Major legislation ==
- May 15, 1916: Kern Amendment
- May 29, 1916: Fraudulent Advertising Act of 1916
- May 31, 1916: Tillman Act
- June 3, 1916: National Defense Act of 1916
- June 9, 1916: Chamberlain–Ferris Act
- July 11, 1916: Federal Aid Road Act of 1916 (Bankhead–Shackleford Act, also known as Federal "Good Roads" Act)
- July 11, 1916: Terminal Inspection Act of 1916
- July 17, 1916: Federal Farm Loan Act (Hollis–Lever Act)
- July 27, 1916: River and Harbors Act of 1916
- July 28, 1916: Post Office Appropriation Act of 1916
- August 9, 1916: Uniform Bill of Lading Act of 1916
- August 11, 1916: Irrigation District Act of 1916 (Smith Act)
- August 11, 1916: Wildlife Game Refuges Act of 1916
- August 11, 1916: Grain Standards Act of 1916
- August 11, 1916: Cotton Futures Act of 1916
- August 11, 1916: Brush Disposal Act of 1916
- August 11, 1916: Warehouse Act of 1916
- August 25, 1916: National Park Service Act (Kent–Smoot Act)
- August 29, 1916: 2nd Uniform Bill of Lading Act of 1916
- August 29, 1916: Jones Act (Philippines)
- August 29, 1916: Federal Possession and Control Act of 1916
- August 29, 1916: Army Appropriations Act of 1916
- August 29, 1916: Naval Act of 1916
- August 29, 1916: Naval Reserve Force Act
- August 31, 1916: Federal Standard Container Act
- August 31, 1916: Standard Fruits and Vegetable Baskets and Containers Act of 1916
- September 1, 1916: Keating–Owen Act
- September 3, 1916: Adamson Act
- September 7, 1916: Merchant Marine Act of 1916 (Alexander Act)
- September 7, 1916: Workingmen's Compensation Act (Kern–McGillicuddy Act)
- September 8, 1916: Anti-Dumping Act of 1916
- September 8, 1916: Emergency Revenue Act of 1916
- October 20, 1916: Special Air Preparedness Act
- December 29, 1916: Stock-Raising Homestead Act
- February 5, 1917: Immigration Act of 1917
- February 22, 1917: Federal Interpleader Act of 1917
- February 23, 1917: Smith–Hughes Act
- February 26, 1917: Mount McKinley National Park Act of 1917
- March 1, 1917: Flood Control Act of 1917 (Ransdell–Humphreys Act)
- March 2, 1917: Jones–Shafroth Act
- March 3, 1917: Reed Amendment
- March 3, 1917: Sheppard Bone-Dry Act
- March 3, 1917: Special Preparedness Fund Act of 1917
- March 4, 1917: Timber Export Act

== Treaties ==
- January 17, 1917: Treaty of the Danish West Indies signed by President Wilson, ceding the Danish West Indies to the United States after their purchase from Denmark and renaming them the US Virgin Islands.

== Party summary ==
=== Senate ===
	Party (shading shows control)			Total	Vacant
	Democratic (D)	Republican (R)	Other	Total	Vacant
End of previous congress	53	42	1 (Note: Progressive)	96	0
Begin	56	40	0	96	0
End	55	41	0	96	0
Final voting share	57.3%	42.7%	0.0%		
Beginning of next congress	54	42	0	96	0

=== House of Representatives ===
	Party (shading shows control)						Total	Vacant
	Democratic (D)	Bull Moose (Prog.)	Socialist (Soc.)	Independent (I)	Prohibition (Proh.)	Republican (R)	Total	Vacant
End of previous congress	282	11	0	1	0	130	424	11
Begin	230	6	1	1	1	192	431	4
End	227	4	1	1	1	200	434	1
Final voting share	52.3%	0.9%	0.2%	0.2%	0.2%	46.1%		
Beginning of next congress	213	3	1	0	1	216	434	1

== Leadership ==
=== Senate ===
- President: Thomas R. Marshall (D)
- Presidents pro tempore: James P. Clarke (D) and Willard Saulsbury Jr. (D)
- Majority Whip: J. Hamilton Lewis (D)
- Minority Whip: Charles Curtis (R)
- Republican Conference Chairman: Jacob Harold Gallinger
- Democratic Caucus Chairman: John W. Kern
- Republican Conference Secretary: James Wolcott Wadsworth Jr.
- Democratic Caucus Secretary: Willard Saulsbury Jr., until December 14, 1916
  - Key Pittman, acting

=== House of Representatives ===
- Speaker: Champ Clark (D)

==== Majority (Democratic) leadership ====
- Majority Leader: Claude Kitchin
- Majority Whip: vacant
- Democratic Caucus Chairman: Edward W. Saunders
- Democratic Campaign Committee Chairman: Frank Ellsworth Doremus

==== Minority (Republican) leadership ====
- Minority Leader: James R. Mann
- Minority Whip: Charles M. Hamilton
- Republican Conference Chairman: William S. Greene
- Republican Campaign Committee Chairman: Frank P. Woods

== Members ==
Skip to House of Representatives, below

=== Senate ===
Prior to the 64th Congress, per Article 1, Section 3, Clause 1 of the Constitution, all senators had been "chosen by the [State] Legislature thereof." (As a practical matter, many senators had been "elected"; however, technically, those elections were subject to affirmation by the State Legislatures.)

However, 32 senators of the 64th Congress - those of Senate Class 3 - were directly elected by popular vote in the 1914 United States Senate Elections as directed by the 17th Amendment. The 17th stipulated that it "...shall not be so construed as to affect the election or term of any senator chosen before it becomes valid as part of the Constitution." Thus, Class 1 and 2 senators were not subject to election until 1916 and 1918, respectively. (Note, however, that should a senator have perished prior to the end of his term, then their replacement would have been subject to direct election as they would not have been "chosen before" ratification. This is why Augustus Bacon was the first senator constitutionally elected on July 15, 1913.)

==== Alabama ====
▌2. John H. Bankhead (D)
▌3. Oscar Underwood (D)

==== Arizona ====
▌1. Henry F. Ashurst (D)
▌3. Marcus A. Smith (D)

==== Arkansas ====
▌2. Joseph Taylor Robinson (D)
▌3. James P. Clarke (D), until October 1, 1916

▌William F. Kirby (D), from November 8, 1916

==== California ====
▌1. John D. Works (R)
▌3. James D. Phelan (D)

==== Colorado ====
▌2. John F. Shafroth (D)
▌3. Charles S. Thomas (D)

==== Connecticut ====
▌1. George P. McLean (R)
▌3. Frank B. Brandegee (R)

==== Delaware ====
▌1. Henry A. du Pont (R)
▌2. Willard Saulsbury Jr. (D)

==== Florida ====
▌1. Nathan P. Bryan (D)
▌3. Duncan U. Fletcher (D)

==== Georgia ====
▌2. Thomas W. Hardwick (D)
▌3. Hoke Smith (D)

==== Idaho ====
▌2. William E. Borah (R)
▌3. James H. Brady (R)

==== Illinois ====
▌2. James Hamilton Lewis (D)
▌3. Lawrence Y. Sherman (R)

==== Indiana ====
▌1. John W. Kern (D)
▌3. Benjamin F. Shively (D), until March 14, 1916

▌Thomas Taggart (D), March 20, 1916 - November 7, 1916
▌James E. Watson (R), from November 8, 1916

==== Iowa ====
▌2. William S. Kenyon (R)
▌3. Albert B. Cummins (R)

==== Kansas ====
▌2. William H. Thompson (D)
▌3. Charles Curtis (R)

==== Kentucky ====
▌2. Ollie M. James (D)
▌3. John C. W. Beckham (D)

==== Louisiana ====
▌2. Joseph E. Ransdell (D)
▌3. Robert F. Broussard (D)

==== Maine ====
▌1. Charles Fletcher Johnson (D)
▌2. Edwin C. Burleigh (R), until June 16, 1916

▌Bert M. Fernald (R), from September 11, 1916

==== Maryland ====
▌1. Blair Lee (D)
▌3. John W. Smith (D)

==== Massachusetts ====
▌1. Henry Cabot Lodge (R)
▌2. John W. Weeks (R)

==== Michigan ====
▌1. Charles E. Townsend (R)
▌2. William Alden Smith (R)

==== Minnesota ====
▌1. Moses E. Clapp (R)
▌2. Knute Nelson (R)

==== Mississippi ====
▌1. John Sharp Williams (D)
▌2. James K. Vardaman (D)

==== Missouri ====
▌1. James A. Reed (D)
▌3. William J. Stone (D)

==== Montana ====
▌1. Henry L. Myers (D)
▌2. Thomas J. Walsh (D)

==== Nebraska ====
▌1. Gilbert M. Hitchcock (D)
▌2. George W. Norris (R)

==== Nevada ====
▌1. Key Pittman (D)
▌3. Francis G. Newlands (D)

==== New Hampshire ====
▌2. Henry F. Hollis (D)
▌3. Jacob H. Gallinger (R)

==== New Jersey ====
▌1. James E. Martine (D)
▌2. William Hughes (D)

==== New Mexico ====
▌1. Thomas B. Catron (R)
▌2. Albert B. Fall (R)

==== New York ====
▌1. James A. O'Gorman (D)
▌3. James W. Wadsworth Jr. (R)

==== North Carolina ====
▌2. Furnifold M. Simmons (D)
▌3. Lee S. Overman (D)

==== North Dakota ====
▌1. Porter J. McCumber (R)
▌3. Asle Gronna (R)

==== Ohio ====
▌1. Atlee Pomerene (D)
▌3. Warren G. Harding (R)

==== Oklahoma ====
▌2. Robert L. Owen (D)
▌3. Thomas P. Gore (D)

==== Oregon ====
▌2. Harry Lane (D)
▌3. George E. Chamberlain (D)

==== Pennsylvania ====
▌1. George T. Oliver (R)
▌3. Boies Penrose (R)

==== Rhode Island ====
▌1. Henry F. Lippitt (R)
▌2. LeBaron B. Colt (R)

==== South Carolina ====
▌2. Benjamin R. Tillman (D)
▌3. Ellison D. Smith (D)

==== South Dakota ====
▌2. Thomas Sterling (R)
▌3. Edwin S. Johnson (D)

==== Tennessee ====
▌1. Luke Lea (D)
▌2. John K. Shields (D)

==== Texas ====
▌1. Charles A. Culberson (D)
▌2. Morris Sheppard (D)

==== Utah ====
▌1. George Sutherland (R)
▌3. Reed Smoot (R)

==== Vermont ====
▌1. Carroll S. Page (R)
▌3. William P. Dillingham (R)

==== Virginia ====
▌1. Claude A. Swanson (D)
▌2. Thomas S. Martin (D)

==== Washington ====
▌1. Miles Poindexter (R)
▌3. Wesley L. Jones (R)

==== West Virginia ====
▌1. William E. Chilton (D)
▌2. Nathan Goff (R)

==== Wisconsin ====
▌1. Robert M. La Follette Sr. (R)
▌3. Paul O. Husting (D)

==== Wyoming ====
▌1. Clarence D. Clark (R)
▌2. Francis E. Warren (R)

Senators' party membership by state at the opening of the 64th Congress in March 1915. 2 Democrats 1 Democrat and 1 Republican 2 Republicans

=== House of Representatives ===
The names of representatives are preceded by their district numbers.

==== Alabama ====
▌1. Oscar Lee Gray (D)
▌2. S. Hubert Dent Jr. (D)
▌3. Henry B. Steagall (D)
▌4. Fred L. Blackmon (D)
▌5. J. Thomas Heflin (D)
▌6. William B. Oliver (D)
▌7. John L. Burnett (D)
▌8. Edward B. Almon (D)
▌9. George Huddleston (D)
▌At-large. John Abercrombie (D)

==== Arizona ====
▌At-large. Carl Hayden (D)

==== Arkansas ====
▌1. Thaddeus H. Caraway (D)
▌2. William A. Oldfield (D)
▌3. John N. Tillman (D)
▌4. Otis Wingo (D)
▌5. Henderson M. Jacoway (D)
▌6. Samuel M. Taylor (D)
▌7. William S. Goodwin (D)

==== California ====
▌1. William Kent (I)
▌2. John E. Raker (D)
▌3. Charles F. Curry (R)
▌4. Julius Kahn (R)
▌5. John I. Nolan (R)
▌6. John A. Elston (Prog.)
▌7. Denver S. Church (D)
▌8. Everis A. Hayes (R)
▌9. Charles H. Randall (Proh.)
▌10. William Stephens (Prog.), until July 22, 1916

▌Henry S. Benedict (R), from November 7, 1916

▌11. William Kettner (D)

==== Colorado ====
▌1. Benjamin Hilliard (D)
▌2. Charles Bateman Timberlake (R)
▌3. Edward Keating (D)
▌4. Edward T. Taylor (D)

==== Connecticut ====
▌1. P. Davis Oakey (R)
▌2. Richard P. Freeman (R)
▌3. John Q. Tilson (R)
▌4. Ebenezer J. Hill (R)
▌5. James P. Glynn (R)

==== Delaware ====
▌At-large. Thomas W. Miller (R)

==== Florida ====
▌1. Stephen M. Sparkman (D)
▌2. Frank Clark (D)
▌3. Emmett Wilson (D)
▌4. William J. Sears (D)

==== Georgia ====
▌1. Charles G. Edwards (D)
▌2. Frank Park (D)
▌3. Charles R. Crisp (D)
▌4. William C. Adamson (D)
▌5. William S. Howard (D)
▌6. James W. Wise (D)
▌7. Gordon Lee (D)
▌8. Samuel J. Tribble (D), until December 8, 1916

▌Tinsley W. Rucker Jr. (D), from January 11, 1917

▌9. Thomas Montgomery Bell (D)
▌10. Carl Vinson (D)
▌11. John R. Walker (D)
▌12. Dudley M. Hughes (D)

==== Idaho ====
▌At-large. Addison T. Smith (R)
▌At-large. Robert M. McCracken (R)

==== Illinois ====
▌1. Martin B. Madden (R)
▌2. James R. Mann (R)
▌3. William W. Wilson (R)
▌4. James T. McDermott (D)
▌5. Adolph J. Sabath (D)
▌6. James McAndrews (D)
▌7. Frank Buchanan (D)
▌8. Thomas Gallagher (D)
▌9. Frederick A. Britten (R)
▌10. George E. Foss (R)
▌11. Ira C. Copley (Prog.)
▌12. Charles Eugene Fuller (R)
▌13. John C. McKenzie (R)
▌14. Clyde H. Tavenner (D)
▌15. Edward John King (R)
▌16. Claude U. Stone (D)
▌17. John A. Sterling (R)
▌18. Joseph G. Cannon (R)
▌19. William B. McKinley (R)
▌20. Henry T. Rainey (D)
▌21. Loren E. Wheeler (R)
▌22. William A. Rodenberg (R)
▌23. Martin D. Foster (D)
▌24. Thomas S. Williams (R)
▌25. Edward E. Denison (R)
▌At-large. Burnett M. Chiperfield (R)
▌At-large. William E. Williams (D)

==== Indiana ====
▌1. Charles Lieb (D)
▌2. William A. Cullop (D)
▌3. William E. Cox (D)
▌4. Lincoln Dixon (D)
▌5. Ralph Wilbur Moss (D)
▌6. Finly H. Gray (D)
▌7. Merrill Moores (R)
▌8. John A. M. Adair (D)
▌9. Martin A. Morrison (D)
▌10. William R. Wood (R)
▌11. George W. Rauch (D)
▌12. Cyrus Cline (D)
▌13. Henry A. Barnhart (D)

==== Iowa ====
▌1. Charles A. Kennedy (R)
▌2. Harry E. Hull (R)
▌3. Burton E. Sweet (R)
▌4. Gilbert N. Haugen (R)
▌5. James W. Good (R)
▌6. C. William Ramseyer (R)
▌7. Cassius C. Dowell (R)
▌8. Horace M. Towner (R)
▌9. William R. Green (R)
▌10. Frank P. Woods (R)
▌11. Thomas J. Steele (D)

==== Kansas ====
▌1. Daniel Read Anthony Jr. (R)
▌2. Joseph Taggart (D)
▌3. Philip P. Campbell (R)
▌4. Dudley Doolittle (D)
▌5. Guy T. Helvering (D)
▌6. John R. Connelly (D)
▌7. Jouett Shouse (D)
▌8. William A. Ayres (D)

==== Kentucky ====
▌1. Alben Barkley (D)
▌2. David Hayes Kincheloe (D)
▌3. Robert Y. Thomas Jr. (D)
▌4. Ben Johnson (D)
▌5. J. Swagar Sherley (D)
▌6. Arthur B. Rouse (D)
▌7. J. Campbell Cantrill (D)
▌8. Harvey Helm (D)
▌9. William Jason Fields (D)
▌10. John W. Langley (R)
▌11. Caleb Powers (R)

==== Louisiana ====
▌1. Albert Estopinal (D)
▌2. Henry Garland Dupré (D)
▌3. Whitmell P. Martin (Prog.)
▌4. John Thomas Watkins (D)
▌5. Riley Joseph Wilson (D)
▌6. Lewis Lovering Morgan (D)
▌7. Ladislas Lazaro (D)
▌8. James Benjamin Aswell (D)

==== Maine ====
▌1. Asher C. Hinds (R)
▌2. Daniel J. McGillicuddy (D)
▌3. John A. Peters (R)
▌4. Frank E. Guernsey (R)

==== Maryland ====
▌1. Jesse D. Price (D)
▌2. J. Frederick C. Talbott (D)
▌3. Charles P. Coady (D)
▌4. J. Charles Linthicum (D)
▌5. Sydney Emanuel Mudd II (R)
▌6. David J. Lewis (D)

==== Massachusetts ====
▌1. Allen T. Treadway (R)
▌2. Frederick H. Gillett (R)
▌3. Calvin D. Paige (R)
▌4. Samuel E. Winslow (R)
▌5. John J. Rogers (R)
▌6. Augustus P. Gardner (R)
▌7. Michael F. Phelan (D)
▌8. Frederick W. Dallinger (R)
▌9. Ernest W. Roberts (R)
▌10. Peter F. Tague (D)
▌11. George H. Tinkham (R)
▌12. James A. Gallivan (D)
▌13. William H. Carter (R)
▌14. Richard Olney II (D)
▌15. William S. Greene (R)
▌16. Joseph Walsh (R)

==== Michigan ====
▌1. Frank E. Doremus (D)
▌2. Samuel Beakes (D)
▌3. John M. C. Smith (R)
▌4. Edward L. Hamilton (R)
▌5. Carl Mapes (R)
▌6. Patrick H. Kelley (R)
▌7. Louis C. Cramton (R)
▌8. Joseph W. Fordney (R)
▌9. James C. McLaughlin (R)
▌10. George A. Loud (R)
▌11. Frank D. Scott (R)
▌12. W. Frank James (R)
▌13. Charles Archibald Nichols (R)

==== Minnesota ====
▌1. Sydney Anderson (R)
▌2. Franklin Ellsworth (R)
▌3. Charles Russell Davis (R)
▌4. Carl Van Dyke (D)
▌5. George Ross Smith (R)
▌6. Charles August Lindbergh (R)
▌7. Andrew Volstead (R)
▌8. Clarence B. Miller (R)
▌9. Halvor Steenerson (R)
▌10. Thomas D. Schall (Prog.)

==== Mississippi ====
▌1. Ezekiel S. Candler Jr. (D)
▌2. Hubert D. Stephens (D)
▌3. Benjamin G. Humphreys II (D)
▌4. Thomas U. Sisson (D)
▌5. Samuel Andrew Witherspoon (D), until November 24, 1915

▌William Webb Venable (D), from January 4, 1916

▌6. Pat Harrison (D)
▌7. Percy E. Quin (D)
▌8. James W. Collier (D)

==== Missouri ====
▌1. James T. Lloyd (D)
▌2. William W. Rucker (D)
▌3. Joshua Willis Alexander (D)
▌4. Charles F. Booher (D)
▌5. William Patterson Borland (D)
▌6. Clement C. Dickinson (D)
▌7. Courtney W. Hamlin (D)
▌8. Dorsey W. Shackleford (D)
▌9. James Beauchamp Clark (D)
▌10. Jacob Edwin Meeker (R)
▌11. William Leo Igoe (D)
▌12. Leonidas C. Dyer (R)
▌13. Walter Lewis Hensley (D)
▌14. Joseph J. Russell (D)
▌15. Perl D. Decker (D)
▌16. Thomas L. Rubey (D)

==== Montana ====
▌At-large. John M. Evans (D)
▌At-large. Tom Stout (D)

==== Nebraska ====
▌1. C. Frank Reavis (R)
▌2. Charles O. Lobeck (D)
▌3. Dan V. Stephens (D)
▌4. Charles Henry Sloan (R)
▌5. Ashton C. Shallenberger (D)
▌6. Moses P. Kinkaid (R)

==== Nevada ====
▌At-large. Edwin E. Roberts (R)

==== New Hampshire ====
▌1. Cyrus A. Sulloway (R)
▌2. Edward Hills Wason (R)

==== New Jersey ====
▌1. William J. Browning (R)
▌2. Isaac Bacharach (R)
▌3. Thomas J. Scully (D)
▌4. Elijah C. Hutchinson (R)
▌5. John H. Capstick (R)
▌6. Archibald C. Hart (D)
▌7. Dow H. Drukker (R)
▌8. Edward W. Gray (R)
▌9. Richard Wayne Parker (R)
▌10. Frederick R. Lehlbach (R)
▌11. John J. Eagan (D)
▌12. James A. Hamill (D)

==== New Mexico ====
▌At-large. Benigno C. Hernández (R)

==== New York ====
▌1. Frederick C. Hicks (R) from January 4, 1916
▌2. C. Pope Caldwell (D)
▌3. Joseph V. Flynn (D)
▌4. Harry H. Dale (D)
▌5. James P. Maher (D)
▌6. Frederick W. Rowe (R)
▌7. John J. Fitzgerald (D)
▌8. Daniel J. Griffin (D)
▌9. Oscar W. Swift (R)
▌10. Reuben L. Haskell (R)
▌11. Daniel J. Riordan (D)
▌12. Meyer London (Soc.)
▌13. George W. Loft (D)
▌14. Michael F. Farley (D)
▌15. Michael F. Conry (D), until March 2, 1917
▌16. Peter J. Dooling (D)
▌17. John F. Carew (D)
▌18. Thomas G. Patten (D)
▌19. Walter M. Chandler (Prog.)
▌20. Isaac Siegel (R)
▌21. G. Murray Hulbert (D)
▌22. Henry Bruckner (D)
▌23. Joseph A. Goulden (D), until May 3, 1915

▌William S. Bennet (R), from November 2, 1915

▌24. Woodson R. Oglesby (D)
▌25. James W. Husted (R)
▌26. Edmund Platt (R)
▌27. Charles B. Ward (R)
▌28. Rollin B. Sanford (R)
▌29. James S. Parker (R)
▌30. William B. Charles (R)
▌31. Bertrand H. Snell (R), from November 2, 1915
▌32. Luther W. Mott (R)
▌33. Homer P. Snyder (R)
▌34. George W. Fairchild (R)
▌35. Walter W. Magee (R)
▌36. Norman J. Gould (R), from November 2, 1915
▌37. Harry H. Pratt (R)
▌38. Thomas B. Dunn (R)
▌39. Henry G. Danforth (R)
▌40. S. Wallace Dempsey (R)
▌41. Charles B. Smith (D)
▌42. Daniel A. Driscoll (D)
▌43. Charles M. Hamilton (R)

==== North Carolina ====
▌1. John Humphrey Small (D)
▌2. Claude Kitchin (D)
▌3. George E. Hood (D)
▌4. Edward W. Pou (D)
▌5. Charles M. Stedman (D)
▌6. Hannibal L. Godwin (D)
▌7. Robert N. Page (D)
▌8. Robert L. Doughton (D)
▌9. Edwin Y. Webb (D)
▌10. James Jefferson Britt (R)

==== North Dakota ====
▌1. Henry Thomas Helgesen (R)
▌2. George M. Young (R)
▌3. Patrick Daniel Norton (R)

==== Ohio ====
▌1. Nicholas Longworth (R)
▌2. Alfred G. Allen (D)
▌3. Warren Gard (D)
▌4. J. Edward Russell (R)
▌5. Nelson E. Matthews (R)
▌6. Charles C. Kearns (R)
▌7. Simeon D. Fess (R)
▌8. John A. Key (D)
▌9. Isaac R. Sherwood (D)
▌10. Robert M. Switzer (R)
▌11. Edwin D. Ricketts (R)
▌12. Clement L. Brumbaugh (D)
▌13. Arthur W. Overmyer (D)
▌14. Seward H. Williams (R)
▌15. William C. Mooney (R)
▌16. Roscoe C. McCulloch (R)
▌17. William A. Ashbrook (D)
▌18. David Hollingsworth (R)
▌19. John G. Cooper (R)
▌20. William Gordon (D)
▌21. Robert Crosser (D)
▌22. Henry I. Emerson (R)

==== Oklahoma ====
▌1. James S. Davenport (D)
▌2. William W. Hastings (D)
▌3. Charles D. Carter (D)
▌4. William H. Murray (D)
▌5. Joseph Bryan Thompson (D)
▌6. Scott Ferris (D)
▌7. James V. McClintic (D)
▌8. Dick Thompson Morgan (R)

==== Oregon ====
▌1. Willis C. Hawley (R)
▌2. Nicholas J. Sinnott (R)
▌3. Clifton N. McArthur (R)

==== Pennsylvania ====
▌1. William S. Vare (R)
▌2. George S. Graham (R)
▌3. J. Hampton Moore (R)
▌4. George W. Edmonds (R)
▌5. Peter E. Costello (R)
▌6. George P. Darrow (R)
▌7. Thomas S. Butler (R)
▌8. Henry Winfield Watson (R)
▌9. William W. Griest (R)
▌10. John R. Farr (R)
▌11. John J. Casey (D)
▌12. Robert D. Heaton (R)
▌13. Arthur G. Dewalt (D)
▌14. Louis T. McFadden (R)
▌15. Edgar R. Kiess (R)
▌16. John V. Lesher (D)
▌17. Benjamin K. Focht (R)
▌18. Aaron S. Kreider (R)
▌19. Warren W. Bailey (D)
▌20. C. William Beales (R)
▌21. Charles H. Rowland (R)
▌22. Abraham L. Keister (R)
▌23. Robert F. Hopwood (R)
▌24. Henry W. Temple (R), from November 2, 1915
▌25. Michael Liebel Jr. (D)
▌26. Henry J. Steele (D)
▌27. Solomon T. North (R)
▌28. Samuel H. Miller (R)
▌29. Stephen G. Porter (R)
▌30. William Henry Coleman (R)
▌31. John M. Morin (R)
▌32. Andrew J. Barchfeld (R)
▌At-large. Thomas S. Crago (R)
▌At-large. John R. K. Scott (R)
▌At-large. Daniel F. Lafean (R)
▌At-large. Mahlon M. Garland (R)

==== Rhode Island ====
▌1. George Francis O'Shaunessy (D)
▌2. Walter Russell Stiness (R)
▌3. Ambrose Kennedy (R)

==== South Carolina ====
▌1. Richard S. Whaley (D)
▌2. James F. Byrnes (D)
▌3. Wyatt Aiken (D)
▌4. Joseph T. Johnson (D), until April 19, 1915

▌Samuel J. Nicholls (D), from September 14, 1915

▌5. David E. Finley (D), until January 26, 1917

▌Paul G. McCorkle (D), from February 21, 1917

▌6. J. Willard Ragsdale (D)
▌7. Asbury F. Lever (D)

==== South Dakota ====
▌1. Charles H. Dillon (R)
▌2. Royal C. Johnson (R)
▌3. Harry L. Gandy (D)

==== Tennessee ====
▌1. Sam R. Sells (R)
▌2. Richard W. Austin (R)
▌3. John A. Moon (D)
▌4. Cordell Hull (D)
▌5. William C. Houston (D)
▌6. Joseph W. Byrns (D)
▌7. Lemuel P. Padgett (D)
▌8. Thetus W. Sims (D)
▌9. Finis J. Garrett (D)
▌10. Kenneth McKellar (D)

==== Texas ====
▌1. Eugene Black (D)
▌2. Martin Dies (D)
▌3. James Young (D)
▌4. Sam Rayburn (D)
▌5. Hatton W. Sumners (D)
▌6. Rufus Hardy (D)
▌7. Alexander W. Gregg (D)
▌8. Joe H. Eagle (D)
▌9. George Farmer Burgess (D)
▌10. James P. Buchanan (D)
▌11. Robert L. Henry (D)
▌12. Oscar Callaway (D)
▌13. John H. Stephens (D)
▌14. James L. Slayden (D)
▌15. John Nance Garner (D)
▌16. William R. Smith (D)
▌At-large. James H. Davis (D)
▌At-large. A. Jeff McLemore (D)

==== Utah ====
▌1. Joseph Howell (R)
▌2. James Henry Mays (D)

==== Vermont ====
▌1. Frank L. Greene (R)
▌2. Porter H. Dale (R)

==== Virginia ====
▌1. William A. Jones (D)
▌2. Edward Everett Holland (D)
▌3. Andrew Jackson Montague (D)
▌4. Walter Allen Watson (D)
▌5. Edward W. Saunders (D)
▌6. Carter Glass (D)
▌7. James Hay (D), until October 1, 1916

▌Thomas W. Harrison (D), from November 7, 1916

▌8. Charles Creighton Carlin (D)
▌9. C. Bascom Slemp (R)
▌10. Henry D. Flood (D)

==== Washington ====
▌1. William E. Humphrey (R)
▌2. Lindley H. Hadley (R)
▌3. Albert Johnson (R)
▌4. William Leroy La Follette (R)
▌5. Clarence Cleveland Dill (D)

==== West Virginia ====
▌1. Matthew M. Neely (D)
▌2. William Gay Brown Jr. (D), until March 9, 1916

▌George M. Bowers (R), from May 9, 1916

▌3. Adam B. Littlepage (D)
▌4. Hunter H. Moss Jr. (R), until July 15, 1916

▌Harry C. Woodyard (R), from November 7, 1916

▌5. Edward Cooper (R)
▌At-large. Howard Sutherland (R)

==== Wisconsin ====
▌1. Henry Allen Cooper (R)
▌2. Michael Edmund Burke (D)
▌3. John M. Nelson (R)
▌4. William J. Cary (R)
▌5. William H. Stafford (R)
▌6. Michael K. Reilly (D)
▌7. John J. Esch (R)
▌8. Edward E. Browne (R)
▌9. Thomas Frank Konop (D)
▌10. James A. Frear (R)
▌11. Irvine L. Lenroot (R)

==== Wyoming ====
▌At-large. Franklin W. Mondell (R)

==== Non-voting members ====
▌Alaska Territory. James Wickersham, (R)
▌Hawaii Territory. Jonah Kūhiō Kalanianaʻole, (R)
▌Philippines. Manuel Earnshaw (Resident Commissioner), (I)
▌Philippines. Manuel L. Quezon (Resident Commissioner), (Nac.) until October 15, 1916
▌Puerto Rico. Luis Muñoz Rivera (Resident Commissioner), (Unionist), until November 15, 1916

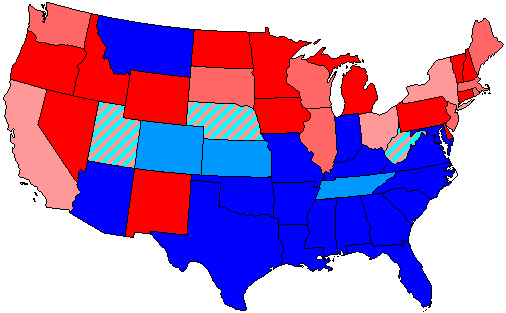
House seats by party holding plurality in state: 80+% Democratic / 80+% Republican; 60+% to 80% Democratic / 60+% to 80% Republican; Up to 60% Democratic / Up to 60% Republican

== Changes in membership ==
The count below reflects changes from the beginning of the first session of this Congress.

=== Senate ===
- Replacements: 3
  - Democratic: 1 seat net loss
  - Republican: 1 seat net gain
- Deaths: 3
- Resignations: 0
- Vacancy: 0
- Total seats with changes: 4

State	Senator	Reason for vacancy	Successor	Date of successor's installation
Indiana (3)	Benjamin F. Shively (D)	Died March 14, 1916. Successor was appointed.	Thomas Taggart (D)	March 20, 1916
Maine (2)	Edwin C. Burleigh (R)	Died June 16, 1916. Successor was elected.	Bert M. Fernald (R)	September 12, 1916
Arkansas (3)	James P. Clarke (D)	Died October 1, 1916. Successor was elected.	William F. Kirby (D)	November 8, 1916
Indiana (3)	Thomas Taggart (D)	Successor was elected.	James E. Watson (R)	November 8, 1916

=== House of Representatives ===
- Replacements: 9
  - Democratic: 2 seat loss
  - Republican: 3 seat gain
  - Progressive: 1 seat loss
- Deaths: 8
- Resignations: 12
- Contested elections: 4
- Total seats with changes: 15

District	Vacated by	Reason for vacancy	Successor	Date of successor's installation
New York 31st	Vacant	Rep. Edwin A. Merritt died during previous congress	Bertrand Snell (R)	November 2, 1915
New York 36th	Vacant	Rep. Sereno E. Payne died during previous congress	Norman J. Gould (R)	November 2, 1915
Pennsylvania 24th	Vacant	Rep.-elect William M. Brown died during previous congress	Henry W. Temple (R)	November 2, 1915
New York 1st	Vacant	Election was tied up in the courts	Frederick C. Hicks (R)	January 4, 1916
South Carolina 4th	Joseph T. Johnson (D)	Resigned April 19, 1915	Samuel J. Nicholls (D)	September 4, 1915
New York 23rd	Joseph A. Goulden (D)	Died May 3, 1915	William S. Bennet (R)	November 2, 1915
Mississippi 5th	Samuel A. Witherspoon (D)	Died November 24, 1915	William W. Venable (D)	January 4, 1916
West Virginia 2nd	William Gay Brown Jr. (D)	Died March 9, 1916	George M. Bowers (R)	May 9, 1916
West Virginia 4th	Hunter H. Moss Jr. (R)	Died July 15, 1916	Harry C. Woodyard (R)	November 7, 1916
California 10th	William Stephens (Prog.)	Resigned July 22, 1916, after being elected Lieutenant Governor of California	Henry S. Benedict (R)	November 7, 1916
Virginia 7th	James Hay (D)	Resigned October 1, 1916, after being appointed judge of the United States Court of Claims	Thomas W. Harrison (D)	November 7, 1916
Philippines Resident Commissioner	Manuel L. Quezon	Resigned October 15, 1916, after being elected to the Senate of the Philippines	Seat remained vacant until next Congress	
Puerto Rico Resident Commissioner	Luis Muñoz Rivera	Died November 15, 1916	Seat remained vacant until next Congress	
Georgia 8th	Samuel J. Tribble (D)	Incumbent died December 8, 1916. Successor elected January 11, 1917.	Tinsley W. Rucker Jr. (D)	January 11, 1917
South Carolina 5th	David E. Finley (D)	Resigned January 26, 1917. Successor elected February 21, 1917.	Paul G. McCorkle (D)	February 21, 1917
New York 15th	Michael F. Conry (D)	Died March 2, 1917	Seat remained vacant until next Congress	

== Committees ==
Lists of committees and their party leaders for members of the House and Senate committees can be found through the Official Congressional Directory at the bottom of this article. The directory after the pages of terms of service lists committees of the Senate, House (Standing with Subcommittees, Select and Special) and Joint and, after that, House/Senate committee assignments. On the committees section of the House and Senate in the Official Congressional Directory, the committee's members on the first row on the left side shows the chairman of the committee and on the right side shows the ranking member of the committee.

=== Senate ===
- Additional Accommodations for the Library of Congress (Select) (Chairman: Boies Penrose; Ranking Member: William J. Stone)
- Agriculture and Forestry (Chairman: Thomas P. Gore; Ranking Member: Francis E. Warren)
- Appropriations (Chairman: Thomas S. Martin; Ranking Member: Francis E. Warren)
- Audit and Control the Contingent Expenses of the Senate (Chairman: John S. Williams; Ranking Member: William P. Dillingham)
- Banking and Currency (Chairman: Robert L. Owen; Ranking Member: Knute Nelson)
- Canadian Relations (Chairman: John K. Shields; Ranking Member: George T. Oliver)
- Census (Chairman: William E. Chilton; Ranking Member: Robert M. La Follette)
- Civil Service and Retrenchment (Chairman: Atlee Pomerene; Ranking Member: Albert B. Cummins)
- Claims (Chairman: Nathan P. Bryan; Ranking Member: Edwin C. Burleigh then Nathan Goff)
- Coast and Insular Survey (Chairman: Willard Saulsbury; Ranking Member: Charles E. Townsend)
- Coast Defenses (Chairman: James E. Martine; Ranking Member: Henry A. du Pont)
- Commerce (Chairman: James P. Clarke; Ranking Member: Knute Nelson)
- Conservation of National Resources (Chairman: James K. Vardaman; Ranking Member: Clarence D. Clark)
- Corporations Organized in the District of Columbia (Chairman: Robert M. La Follette; Ranking Member: William J. Stone)
- Cuban Relations (Chairman: Joseph L. Bristow then Oscar Underwood; Ranking Member: William A. Smith)
- Disposition of Useless Papers in the Executive Departments (Chairman: Carroll S. Page; Ranking Member: James E. Martine)
- District of Columbia (Chairman: John W. Smith; Ranking Member: William P. Dillingham)
- Education and Labor (Chairman: Hoke Smith; Ranking Member: William E. Borah)
- Engrossed Bills (Chairman: Francis E. Warren; Ranking Member: Furnifold M. Simmons)
- Enrolled Bills (Chairman: Henry F. Hollis; Ranking Member: Charles Curtis)
- Establish a University in the United States (Select) (Chairman: N/A)
- Examine the Several Branches in the Civil Service (Chairman: William A. Smith; Ranking Member: Luke Lea)
- Expenditures in the Department of Agriculture (Chairman: Morris Sheppard; Ranking Member: Henry F. Lippitt)
- Expenditures in the Department of Commerce and Labor (Chairman: William H. Thompson; Ranking Member: Albert B. Fall)
- Expenditures in the Interior Department (Chairman: Reed Smoot; Ranking Member: Claude A. Swanson)
- Expenditures in the Department of Justice (Chairman: George Sutherland; Ranking Member: Key Pittman)
- Expenditures in the Navy Department (Chairman: William Hughes)
- Expenditures in the Post Office Department (Chairman: Blair Lee; Ranking Member: Asle Gronna)
- Expenditures in the Department of State (Chairman: J. Hamilton Lewis; Ranking Member: Boies Penrose)
- Expenditures in the Treasury Department (Chairman: Joseph T. Robinson; Ranking Member: John D. Works)
- Expenditures in the War Department (Chairman: Miles Poindexter; Ranking Member: Harry Lane)
- Finance (Chairman: Furnifold M. Simmons; Ranking Member: Boies Penrose)
- Fisheries (Chairman: John R. Thornton; Ranking Member: John D. Works)
- Five Civilized Tribes of Indians (Chairman: Knute Nelson; Ranking Member: Benjamin R. Tillman)
- Foreign Relations (Chairman: Augustus O. Bacon; Ranking Member: Henry Cabot Lodge)
- Forest Reservations and the Protection of Game (Chairman: Harry Lane; Ranking Member: George P. McLean)
- Geological Survey (Chairman: Clarence D. Clark; Ranking Member: John W. Kern)
- Immigration (Chairman: Ellison D. Smith; Ranking Member: Henry Cabot Lodge)
- Indian Affairs (Chairman: William J. Stone; Ranking Member: Moses E. Clapp)
- Indian Depredations (Chairman: William E. Borah; Ranking Member: Claude A. Swanson)
- Industrial Expositions (Chairman: Henry F. Ashurst; Ranking Member: George T. Oliver)
- Interoceanic Canals (Chairman: James A. O'Gorman; Ranking Member: Frank B. Brandegee)
- Interstate Commerce (Chairman: Francis G. Newlands; Ranking Member: Moses E. Clapp)
- Irrigation and Reclamation of Arid Lands (Chairman: Marcus A. Smith; Ranking Member: Wesley L. Jones)
- Judiciary (Chairman: Charles A. Culberson; Ranking Member: Clarence D. Clark)
- Library (Chairman: Luke Lea; Ranking Member: Albert B. Cummins)
- Manufactures (Chairman: James A. Reed; Ranking Member: George T. Oliver)
- Military Affairs (Chairman: George E. Chamberlain; Ranking Member: Henry A. du Pont)
- Mines and Mining (Chairman: Thomas J. Walsh; Ranking Member: Miles Poindexter)
- Mississippi River and its Tributaries (Select) (Chairman: Albert B. Cummins; Ranking Member: John Sharp Williams)
- National Banks (Chairman: Charles F. Johnson; Ranking Member: James H. Brady)
- Naval Affairs (Chairman: Benjamin R. Tillman; Ranking Member: Boies Penrose)
- Pacific Islands and Puerto Rico (Chairman: John F. Shafroth; Ranking Member: Miles Poindexter)
- Pacific Railroads (Chairman: Frank B. Brandegee; Ranking Member: James A. Reed)
- Patents (Chairman: Ollie M. James; Ranking Member: Frank B. Brandegee)
- Pensions (Chairman: Benjamin F. Shively; Ranking Member: Porter J. McCumber)
- Philippines (Chairman: Gilbert M. Hitchcock; Ranking Member: George P. McLean)
- Post Office and Post Roads (Chairman: John H. Bankhead; Ranking Member: Boies Penrose)
- Printing (Chairman: Duncan U. Fletcher; Ranking Member: Reed Smoot)
- Private Land Claims (Chairman: Henry Cabot Lodge; Ranking Member: Benjamin R. Tillman)
- Privileges and Elections (Chairman: John W. Kern; Ranking Member: William P. Dillingham)
- Public Buildings and Grounds (Chairman: Claude A. Swanson; Ranking Member: George Sutherland)
- Public Health and National Quarantine (Chairman: Joseph E. Ransdell; Ranking Member: Reed Smoot)
- Public Lands (Chairman: Henry L. Myers; Ranking Member: Reed Smoot)
- Railroads (Chairman: George C. Perkins; Ranking Member: George T. Oliver)
- Revision of the Laws (Chairman: Joseph T. Robinson; Ranking Member: N/A)
- Revolutionary Claims (Chairman: William O. Bradley; Ranking Member: Edwin C. Burleigh then Charles Curtis)
- Rules (Chairman: Lee S. Overman; Ranking Member: Jacob H. Gallinger)
- Standards, Weights and Measures (Chairman: Moses E. Clapp; Ranking Member: John H. Bankhead)
- Tariff Regulation (Select)
- Telepost (Select)
- Territories (Chairman: Key Pittman; Ranking Member: Knute Nelson)
- Transportation and Sale of Meat Products (Select) (Chairman: Henry A. du Pont; Ranking Member: Henry F. Hollis)
- Transportation Routes to the Seaboard (Chairman: Porter J. McCumber; Ranking Member: Morris Sheppard)
- Trespassers upon Indian Lands (Select) (Chairman: Isaac Stephenson; Ranking Member: Miles Poindexter)
- Whole
- Woman Suffrage (Chairman: Charles S. Thomas; Ranking Member: George Sutherland)

=== House of Representatives ===
- Accounts (Chairman: James T. Lloyd; Ranking Member: Thomas W. Miller)
- Agriculture (Chairman: Asbury F. Lever; Ranking Member: Gilbert N. Haugen)
- Alcoholic Liquor Traffic (Chairman: Adolph J. Sabath; Ranking Member: Addison T. Smith)
- Appropriations (Chairman: John J. Fitzgerald; Ranking Member: Frederick H. Gillett)
- Banking and Currency (Chairman: Carter Glass; Ranking Member: Everis A. Hayes)
- Census (Chairman: Harvey Helm; Ranking Member: Asher C. Hinds)
- Claims (Chairman: Edward W. Pou; Ranking Member: George W. Edmonds)
- Coinage, Weights and Measures (Chairman: Thomas W. Hardwick; Ranking Member: Edwin E. Roberts)
- Disposition of Executive Papers (Chairman: J. Frederick Cockey Talbott; Ranking Member: William S. Bennet)
- District of Columbia (Chairman: Ben Johnson; Ranking Member: William J. Cary)
- Education (Chairman: Dudley M. Hughes; Ranking Member: Caleb Powers)
- Election of the President, Vice President and Representatives in Congress (Chairman: William W. Rucker; Ranking Member: Carl E. Mapes)
- Elections No.#1 (Chairman: James D. Post; Ranking Member: Merrill Moores)
- Elections No.#2 (Chairman: James A. Hamill; Ranking Member: John Jacob Rogers)
- Elections No.#3 (Chairman: Lewis L. Morgan; Ranking Member: Cassius C. Dowell)
- Enrolled Bills (Chairman: William A. Ashbrook; Ranking Member: William R. Wood)
- Expenditures in the Agriculture Department (Chairman: Robert L. Doughton; Ranking Member: Edward J. King)
- Expenditures in the Commerce Department (Chairman: John H. Rothermel; Ranking Member: Thomas Sutler Williams)
- Expenditures in the Interior Department (Chairman: James M. Graham; Ranking Member: Aaron S. Kreider)
- Expenditures in the Justice Department (Chairman: Robert F. Broussard; Ranking Member: Stephen G. Porter)
- Expenditures in the Labor Department (Chairman: James P. Maher; Ranking Member: John G. Cooper)
- Expenditures in the Navy Department (Chairman: Rufus Hardy; Ranking Member: George Edmund Foss)
- Expenditures in the Post Office Department (Chairman: N/A; Ranking Member: Harry H. Pratt)
- Expenditures in the State Department (Chairman: Courtney W. Hamlin; Ranking Member: George H. Tinkham)
- Expenditures in the Treasury Department (Chairman: Charles O. Lobeck; Ranking Member: Henry Wilson Temple)
- Expenditures in the War Department (Chairman: John A.M. Adair; Ranking Member: Luther W. Mott)
- Expenditures on Public Buildings (Chairman: Thomas F. Konop; Ranking Member: William A. Rodenberg)
- Foreign Affairs (Chairman: Henry D. Flood; Ranking Member: Henry Allen Cooper)
- Immigration and Naturalization (Chairman: John L. Burnett; Ranking Member: Everis A. Hayes)
- Indian Affairs (Chairman: John H. Stephens; Ranking Member: Philip P. Campbell)
- Industrial Arts and Expositions (Chairman: Edwin S. Underhill; Ranking Member: Frank P. Woods)
- Insular Affairs (Chairman: William A. Jones; Ranking Member: Horace M. Towner)
- Interstate and Foreign Commerce (Chairman: William C. Adamson; Ranking Member: John J. Esch)
- Invalid Pensions (Chairman: Isaac R. Sherwood; Ranking Member: John W. Langley)
- Irrigation of Arid Lands (Chairman: William R. Smith; Ranking Member: Moses P. Kinkaid)
- Judiciary (Chairman: Henry De Lamar Clayton; Ranking Member: Andrew J. Volstead)
- Labor (Chairman: David J. Lewis; Ranking Member: John M.C. Smith)
- Library (Chairman: James L. Slayden; Ranking Member: William B. McKinley)
- Merchant Marine and Fisheries (Chairman: Joshua W. Alexander; Ranking Member: William S. Greene)
- Mileage (Chairman: Warren W. Bailey; Ranking Member: Burnett M. Chiperfield)
- Military Affairs (Chairman: James Hay; Ranking Member: Julius Kahn)
- Mines and Mining (Chairman: Martin D. Foster; Ranking Member: Mahlon M. Garland)
- Naval Affairs (Chairman: Lemuel P. Padgett; Ranking Member: Thomas S. Butler)
- Patents (Chairman: William A. Oldfield; Ranking Member: John I. Nolan)
- Pensions (Chairman: John A. Key; Ranking Member: Sam R. Sells)
- Post Office and Post Roads (Chairman: John A. Moon; Ranking Member: Halvor Steenerson)
- Printing (Chairman: Henry A. Barnhart; Ranking Member: Edgar R. Kiess)
- Public Buildings and Grounds (Chairman: Frank Clark; Ranking Member: Richard W. Austin)
- Public Lands (Chairman: Scott Ferris; Ranking Member: Irvine L. Lenroot)
- Railways and Canals (Chairman: Martin Dies; Ranking Member: William L. La Follette)
- Reform in the Civil Service (Chairman: Hannibal L. Godwin; Ranking Member: William B. McKinley)
- Revision of Laws (Chairman: John T. Watkins; Ranking Member: Merrill Moores)
- Rivers and Harbors (Chairman: Stephen M. Sparkman; Ranking Member: William E. Humphrey)
- Roads (Chairman: Dorsey W. Shackleford; Ranking Member: Thomas B. Dunn)
- Rules (Chairman: Robert L. Henry; Ranking Member: Philip P. Campbell)
- Standards of Official Conduct
- Territories (Chairman: William C. Houston; Ranking Member: Frank Guernsey)
- War Claims (Chairman: Alexander W. Gregg; Ranking Member: Benjamin K. Focht)
- Ways and Means (Chairman: Oscar Underwood; Ranking Member: Joseph W. Fordney)
- Whole

=== Joint committees ===
- Armor Plant Costs (Special)
- Conditions of Indian Tribes (Special)
- Federal Aid in Construction of Post Roads
- Disposition of (Useless) Executive Papers
- The Library (Chairman: Sen. John Sharp Williams)
- Interstate Commerce (Chairman: Sen. Francis G. Newlands)
- Investigate the General Parcel Post
- Printing (Chairman: Sen. Duncan U. Fletcher)
- Postage on 2nd Class Mail Matter and Compensation for Transportation of Mail (Chairman: Sen. Jonathan Bourne Jr.)
- Rural Credits (Chairman: Rep. Carter Glass)
- Second Class Mail Matter and Compensation for Rail Mail Service

== Caucuses ==
- Democratic (House)
- Democratic (Senate)

== Employees ==
=== Legislative branch agency directors ===
- Architect of the Capitol: Elliott Woods
- Librarian of Congress: Herbert Putnam
- Public Printer of the United States: Cornelius Ford

=== Senate ===
- Chaplain: F. J. Prettyman (Methodist)
- Secretary: James M. Baker
- Librarian: Edward C. Goodwin
- Sergeant at Arms: Charles P. Higgins

=== House of Representatives ===
- Chaplain: Henry N. Couden
- Clerk: South Trimble
- Clerk at the Speaker's Table: Bennett C. Clark
- Doorkeeper: Joseph J. Sinnott
- Reading Clerks: Patrick Joseph Haltigan (D) and H. Martin Williams (R)
- Postmaster: William M. Dunbar
- Sergeant at Arms: Robert B. Gordon

== See also ==
- 1914 United States elections (elections leading to this Congress)
  - 1914 United States Senate elections
  - 1914 United States House of Representatives elections
- 1916 United States elections (elections during this Congress, leading to the next Congress)
  - 1916 United States presidential election
  - 1916 United States Senate elections
  - 1916 United States House of Representatives elections
