= The New Freedom =

Woodrow Wilson's campaign platform in the 1912 US presidential election

The New Freedom was Woodrow Wilson's platform in the 1912 presidential election, and also refers to the progressive programs enacted by Wilson during his time as president. First expressed in his campaign speeches and promises, Wilson later wrote a 1913 book of the same name. After the 1918 midterm elections, Republicans took control of Congress and were mostly hostile to the New Freedom. As president, Wilson focused on various types of reform, such as the following:

1. Tariff reform: This came through the passage of the Underwood Tariff Act of 1913, which lowered tariffs for the first time since 1857 and went against the protectionist lobby.
2. Labor reform: This was achieved through measures such as the Eight Hour Law for Women of the District of Columbia, the Seaman's Act, Workmen's Compensation for Federal employees, the Federal Child Labor Bill, and the Adamson Act. During the 1912 campaign Wilson spoke in support of workers organizing into unions while endorsing "the betterment of men in this occupation and the other, the protection of women, the shielding of children, the bringing about of social justice."
3. Business reform: This was established through the passage of the Federal Trade Commission Act of 1914, which established the Federal Trade Commission to investigate and halt unfair and illegal business practices by issuing "cease and desist" orders, and the Clayton Antitrust Act.
4. Agricultural reform: This was achieved through measures such as the Cotton Futures and Smith-Lever Acts of 1914, the Grain Standards and Warehouse Acts of 1916, and the Smith-Hughes Act of 1917.
5. Banking reform: This came in 1913 through the creation of the Federal Reserve System and in 1916 through the passage of the Federal Farm Loan Act, which set up Farm Loan Banks to support farmers.

== Campaign slogan in 1912 ==
Wilson's position in 1912 stood in opposition to Progressive party candidate Theodore Roosevelt's ideas of New Nationalism, particularly on the issue of antitrust modification. According to Wilson, "If America is not to have free enterprise, he can have freedom of no sort whatever." Wilson was strongly influenced by his chief economic advisor Louis D. Brandeis, an enemy of big business and monopoly.

Although Wilson and Roosevelt agreed that economic power was being abused by trusts, Wilson and Roosevelt were split on how the government should handle the restraint of private power as in dismantling corporations that had too much economic power in a large society. Wilson wrote extensively on the meaning of "government" shortly after his election.

== Wilson in office ==
Once elected, Wilson rolled out a program of social and economic reform. Wilson appointed Brandeis to the US Supreme Court in 1916. He worked with Congress to give federal employees worker's compensation, outlawed child labor with the Keating–Owen Act (the act was ruled unconstitutional in 1918) and passed the Adamson Act, which secured a maximum eight-hour workday for railroad employees. Most important was the Clayton Act of 1914, which largely put the trust issue to rest by spelling out the specific unfair practices that business were not allowed to engage in. The legislative environment was favourable to Wilson, with progressive Democratic majorities in Congress during his first term in office.

By the end of the Wilson Administration, a significant amount of progressive legislation had been passed, affecting not only economic and constitutional affairs, but farmers, labor, veterans, the environment, and conservation as well. The reform agenda actually put into legislation by Wilson, however, did not extend as far as what Roosevelt had called for but had never actually passed, such as a standard 40-hour work week, minimum wage laws, and a federal system of social insurance.

This was arguably a reflection of Wilson’s doubts over the extent of the federal government’s constitutional powers. This was demonstrated in 1916 when Wilson was advised by Oklahoma senator Robert Owen to appropriate the social justice plank of Roosevelt's Bull Moose Party. As Owen put it to Wilson in a letter dated June the 2nd 1916:

I wish to emphasize on your attention the importance of having the Democratic Platform in St. Louis contain the progressive principles which were set forth in the Progressive Platform of 1912, in which ninety-nine Democrats out of a hundred believe, and which would make special appeal to the progressive Republicans of the Nation. I wish you would very carefully consider this matter and not overlook its importance as a means of promoting social and industrial reforms, as well as political reforms, and as a means of attaching to our party progressive Republicans who are in sympathy with us in so large a degree.

Although Wilson understood the importance of Owen’s suggestion, he believed (as he put it to Owen) that “Many of the Progressive principles set forth in the Progressive platform of 1912” were “merely in thesis, because they affected matters controlled by the states and not by the national government.” Wilson asked Owen to provide him with a memorandum “as to those which you think we can all agree on.” In response to Wilson’s request, Owen highlighted federal legislation to promote workers' health and safety, prohibit child labour, establish minimum wages and maximum hours, and prevent involuntary unemployment. Wilson, in turn, included in his draft platform a plank that called for (as noted by one historian) “all work done by and for the federal government to provide a minimum wage, an eight-hour day and six-day workweek, and health and safety measures and to prohibit child labour, and - his own additions- protections for female workers and a retirement program.” Although these proposed reforms were directed towards federal employees, the Democratic platform for 1916 called for the adoption of similar principles to be “urged and applied” by the legislation of the States.

The New Freedom reflected Wilson's ideological outlook, who identified himself with progressive liberal politics throughout much of his life, in addition to his time as president. During his time as governor of New Jersey, a number of reform laws were passed by the New Jersey legislature and signed by Wilson. This included laws providing "for at least one-half hour meal time after six continuous hours of labor" and the appointment of commissioners on old age pensions and old age insurance, together with laws concerning working hours and health and safety. Wilson also spoke out in support of legislation benefiting labor, stating in one of his annual messages:

We have done much toward securing justice and safety for the workingmen of the State in our factory laws, our tenement-house legislation, and our Employers' Liability act, but we have not done enough. Our workmen very justly demand further legislation with regard to the inspection and regulation of factories and workshops, and I recommend legislation of this kind to your very careful and earnest consideration. I recommend, moreover, the passage at an early date of an act requiring the railways operating within this State to provide their trains with adequate crews. Our sister State of Pennsylvania has adopted legislation of this kind, and the railways whose lines cross from Pennsylvania into New Jersey actually carry full crews to the border of this State, and then send their trains on through New Jersey with diminished crews, to the jeopardy, as I believe, of life and property; requiring more of the small crew than it can safely and thoroughly do.

Similarly, during a political address in Indianapolis in April 1911, Wilson asserted that “we must see to it that men working in masses, under conditions that are not really conditions of free contract, are safeguarded in their lives and rights by our legislatures.”

In his acceptance speech for the Democratic nomination, Wilson argued in favor of labor legislation, stating that

The working people of America, — if they must be distinguished from the minority that constitutes the rest of it, — are, of course, the backbone of the Nation. No law that safeguards their lives, that improves the physical and moral conditions under which they live, that makes their hours of labor rational and tolerable, that gives them freedom to act in their own interest, and that protects them where they cannot protect themselves, can properly be regarded as class legislation or as anything but as a measure taken in the interest of the whole people, whose partnership in right action we are trying to establish and make real and practical.

Wilson was also supportive of the principle of minimum wage legislation, even playing a part in a decision made by Henry Ford to introduce a $5 daily minimum wage for his female employees.

Although Wilson has been identified with conservatism up until 1902, writings of his from the late Nineteenth Century demonstrate an advocacy on his part of interventionist, socially responsible government. In his 1890 work The State, Wilson had advocated a welfarist role for the state, arguing amongst its functions to be the provision of German-style insurance for workmen and care "for the poor and incapable." Wilson was also a supporter of old-age pensions and mothers' pensions (cash allowances for poor mothers), with he and his daughter inviting Henry Nell ("father of mothers' pensions") to discuss "means for spreading the mothers' pension gospel." Wilson's views on welfare were expressed on another occasion in his Notes for Five Lectures on Municipal Government (given at the Brooklyn Institute of Arts and Sciences in November and December 1898), in which he described various functions that he said municipal government must undertake, which included welfarist functions like Sanitation ("including parks, housing of poor and labouring classes etc.") and "Guardianship and relief of destitute and helpless classes ruined by the city pressure"). In the same notes Wilson argued that "Charities, e.g., should be taken from the sphere of private, voluntary organization and endeavour and made the imperative legal duty of the Whole. Relief of the poor, and a bettering of the conditions in which they live is as much a governmental function as Education (coming under the head, not only of human duty, but also of social sanitation). Private charities need not be prohibited."

At some point during his political career, Wilson commissioned members of the Fraternal Order of Eagles to study old age pension laws overseas to see if such laws could be introduced in the United States. As noted by one state senator in later years, "It was learned in this way that institutional care for the aged was costly." Pensions for federal civil servants were introduced in 1920, but it wasn't until 1935 when legislation was passed establishing a national system of old age pensions.

While serving as governor of New Jersey, Wilson's views on welfare were arguably reflected in the platform adopted by the New Jersey Democratic Party in 1912, the authorship of which has been attributed to Wilson, which included a plank calling for more intervention in the field of health and welfare:

We also favour and endorse the efforts which our State and its various institutions are making for the preservation of the public health, and for the purpose of effectually coping with the problem of tuberculosis we believe in the establishment of a system of expert medical inspection of all schoolchildren and the enlargement under expert supervision of a sanitarium for those affected with incipient tuberculosis. To those unfortunates who by reasons of defect of intellect, poverty or enforced confinement are at the present time wards of the State we favour their maintenance and the bestowal upon them of all care possible, so that their deficiencies may be remedied or their condition at least ameliorated."

Wilson expressed similar views in 1913, arguing that workers had the right to a living wage and noting:

There can be no equality of opportunity, the first essential of justice in the body politic, if men and women and children be not shielded in their lives, their very vitality, from the consequences of great industrial and social processes which they can not alter, control or singly cope with. Society must see to it that it does not itself crush or weaken or damage its own constituent parts. The first duty of law is to keep sound the society it serves. Sanitary laws, pure food laws, and laws determining the conditions of labor which individuals are powerless to determine for themselves are intimate parts of the very business of justice and legal efficiency. One of the most hopeful signs of the times is the fact that we are beginning to hear and to understand this 'solemn moving undertone of our life,' and our social legislation is showing signs of an earnest desire to alleviate the dead burden of misery under which our toilers stagger and groan. The State is gradually growing, through the development of its so-called police power, into the stature and dignity of 'parens patrae,' guardian or custodian of the public welfare.

In various campaign speeches in 1912, Wilson spoke of the need for greater social justice in America. In one speech he argued how

we must see to it that there is no overcrowding, that there is no bad sanitation, that there is no unnecessary spread of avoidable diseases, that there is every safeguard against accidents, that women are not driven to impossible tasks and children not permitted to spend their energy before it is fit to be spent, that all the hope of the race must be preserved, and that men must be preserved according to their individual needs and not according to the programs of industry merely.

In another speech, Wilson put forward a similar case for greater government intervention in society, arguing that

A government is intended to serve the people that live under it. Now, there are a great many ways in which to serve the people that live under it, and our government has neglected some of those ways. We are only just now beginning to learn how to take care of our people, to prevent accidents, where accidents are obviously apt to occur in a great many employments, to prevent unreasonable hours of labor, to prevent women [from] being overworked, to prevent young children from being worked at all. There are a score of things which nowadays we regard as the function of the government, but government has been neglectful of these things because it has been taking care of the particular groups of people and not thinking of the life of the people as a whole. And now the American people, high and wide, are looking directly at the government, are putting away all notions about it.

Wilson also spoke of the need to lift people out of poverty, stating in a speech he made in December 1912

God knows that the poor suffer enough in this country already, and a man would hesitate to take a single step that would increase the number of the poor, or the burdens of the poor, but we must move for the emancipation of the poor, and that emancipation will come from our own emancipation from the errors of our minds as to what constitutes prosperity. Prosperity does not exist for a nation unless it be pervasive. Prosperity is not a thing which can be consumed privately or by a small number of persons, and the amount of wealth in a nation is very much less important than the accessibility of wealth in a nation. The more people you make it accessible to the more energy you call forth, until presently, if you carry the process far enough, you get almost the zest of a creative act.

Also, while not a socialist, Wilson agreed with the socialist program the Labour Party (UK) put forward in 1918, with the exception of its call for a minimum wage due to Wilson's uncertainty over how this would be maintained. Amongst the program's many proposals included ending joblessness and an expansion of unemployment benefit coverage.

Although the role of government under Wilson did expand in a progressive direction, the New Freedom did not go as far as his rhetoric suggested it would. For instance, while supportive of benefits for workers such as old age pensions, injury compensation, and profit-sharing plans (noting in his book "The New Freedom" how various companies had introduced such benefits "in good faith" to their employees), Wilson and his administration never pushed legislation through Congress extending these benefits to the entire workforce, while a national health insurance system of the kind advocated by Roosevelt was never established. Despite this, the New Freedom did much to extend the power of the federal government in social and economic affairs, and arguably paved the way for future reform programs such as the New Deal and the Great Society.

== Legislation and programs ==
Note: This listing contains reforms drawn up by the Wilson Administration as part of its New Freedom program together with wartime reforms and reforms drawn up by individual Congressmen. The latter two have been included because it is arguable that the progressive nature of these reforms was compatible with the liberalism of the New Freedom.

=== Farmers ===
- According to one journal, when David F. Houston became the head of the Department of Agriculture in 1913 'he expressed the "progressive movement" ferment by systematically broadening the department's policies directing them into the fields of distribution, into the broader economic problems of rural life, into the questions of fair prices to farmers and unfair prices to consumers, into the problems of farm management and home management.'
- A provision of the Federal Reserve Act, approved on December the 23rd 1913, authorized national banks to lend money on farm mortgages.
- For farmers there was a provision in the Federal Reserve Act in which the Federal Reserve Board "was given power to define the paper which would be eligible for discount, to make agricultural paper eligible, and to give it a maturity of six months as against ninety days for ordinary commercial paper."
- According to one study, the Federal Reserve Act of 1913 particularly benefited farmers “because the Federal Reserve banks increased the money supply to member banks which, in turn, lent to farmers.”
- The 1914 Smith–Lever Act led to the support of the federal government to support farm cooperatives, bringing about a system of country agents to assist farmers in conducting more efficient and scientific stock-raising and crop-growing.
- The Cotton Warehouse Act (1914) authorized the federal government to license warehouses. The intention of this legislation was to ensure that the better handling of crops "would make warehouse receipts more readily acceptable by banks as collateral for loans."
- The establishment of the regional banking system and the administration of the Comptroller of the Currency resulted in a general reduction of interest rates by from 1 to 3%.
- Money was furnished by the Secretary of the Treasury in abundance at low rates to move crops.
- The appropriation for eradication of the cattle tick was doubled, while that for the control of hog cholera was increased from $100,000 to $360,000. In addition, the foot-and-mouth disease was eradicated at a cost to the government of $4,500,000.
- A market and live stock news service was established.
- In a revision of the tariff special attention was paid to the special necessities of farmers, with various articles peculiarly used by farmers placed on the free list. This included articles such as machinery for use in the manufacture of sugar, cotton gins, threshing machines, cultivators, horserakes, mowers, agricultural drills and planters, reapers, harvesters, tooth and disk harrows, plows, and wagons and carts.
- A survey of farm women was carried out in 1913, which was instrumental "in determining early Extension System policies and establishing priorities that affected farm women and men for at least the next two decades."
- The Agricultural Extension Act (1914) authorized federal grants-in-aid to the state agricultural colleges for the purpose of supporting a program of extension work in farm areas.
- The Federal Farm Loan Act of 1916 provided federal credit to small farmers via cooperatives.
- The Warehouse Act of 1916.
- The Stock-Raising Homestead Act of 1916.
- The Grain Standards Act of 1916 mandated the grading and inspection of grains under federal license.
- Under a special appropriation provided by the Food Production and Control Acts of 1917 seeds were purchased and sold to farmers at cost while fertilizer was also distributed. In addition, the Agriculture Department started inspecting agricultural products at central markets that year, while a program of licensing warehouses, fertilizer producers, farm equipment companies and stockyards was also launched.
- From 1918 to 1931 emergency seed loans were provided through the Secretary of Agriculture by Congress. These loans were made "to assist farmers in designated areas that had suffered unusual hardships, such as droughts and floods, and could not obtain credit elsewhere."

=== Labor ===
- A senatorial investigation into industrial dispute in the West Virginia coal fields resulted in gains such as the provision of check weighmen, an 8-hour day, and the right of organization guaranteed.
- In 1914, an 8-hour provision was approved "for employees under the Alaskan coal act."
- The Locomotive boiler inspection act was extended to cover locomotive engines and tenders (1915).
- Leave of absence with pay to employees of government printing office employees was increased from 26 to 30 days per year (1915).
- In 1915, licensed officers, including pilots, mates and masters, were guaranteed the right to quit and protected "when reporting defects of their vessels to government inspectors."
- The Bureau of Mines Act was extended and strengthened, with the provision of 7 new safety stations and 10 new experiment stations (1915).
- Steadier work was assured to employees of Government naval yards.
- The wages of the metal-trade mechanics employed by the Government were increased.
- An investigation of industrial disputes in the Colorado gold fields and Michigan copper region exposed intolerable labor conditions.
- Piecework in the Post Officer Department, Washington, D.C. was prohibited.
- More adequate appropriations were made to the Department of Labor during Wilson's first term to carry on its work.
- A reduction in wages and installation and collection of rents for employees on the Panama Canal Zone were prevented.
- Taylor system, stop-watch and speeding up methods were prohibited in United States torpedo stations, gun factories, navy yards, and arsenals (1914).
- The Federal 8-hour law, which was applicable to contractors doing work for the US Government, was greatly strengthened, "particularly in reference to the basic wage for an eight-hour standard day, and minimum overtime rates for employees of such government contractors."
- In regards to unemployment, Wilson raised his administration's record in tackling this problem during his first term, stating during a Jackson Day speech at Indianapolis in January 1915 "that he regarded the efforts of the department of Labor to deal with the problem as one of the greatest accomplishments of his administration."
- In 1915, the first federal government monthly unemployment figures were issued "from payroll data collected from a few industries."
- The growth and increase in activities of the Public Health Service emphasized the need for a corresponding increase in the number of trained officers for Federal public health work, which Congress recognized "by increased appropriations for the pay of additional commissioned officers for the fiscal year 1915, although only to the extent of one-half the estimate submitted by the department."
- Post Office employees were brought into the reach of the Compensation for Injuries Act (1914).
- The La Follette–Peters Act (1914) mandated an eight-hour workday for most women workers in the District of Columbia.
- The Seamen's Act of 1915 aimed to protect merchant seamen. It outlawed their exploitation by officers and ship owners by practices such as indefinite hours, inadequate food, poor wages, and abandonment in overseas ports with back pay owing.
- The Adamson Act gave railroad workers on interstate runs an eight-hour workday.
- The Clayton Act strengthened antitrust regulation while exempting agricultural cooperatives and labor unions, thus putting an end to the court's habitual rulings that boycotts and strikes were "in restraint of trade."
- A law was passed fixing minimum wages for women and children in the District of Columbia (1918).
- The Women's Bureau Act of 1920 established a Women's Bureau to "formulate standards and policies which shall promote the welfare of wage-earning women, improve their working conditions, increase their efficiency, and advance their opportunities for profitable employment."
- In 1918, the first use "of federal government contracts to restrict the use of child labor took place."
- A Child Labor Tax Law (1919) assessed a 10% tax on the net profits of factories and mines employing children "to offset any competitive advantage" employers thereby gained. The legislation introduced a minimum age of 14 for workers in most jobs, and of 16 for mining and night work. The legislation also required documentary proof of age and, like the previous Keating–Owen Act, limited working hours for minors. From 1919 to 1922 (the year when the Supreme Court declared the legislation to be unconstitutional), arguably as a result of, or partly because of, this legislation, the number of working children fell by 50%.
- The Workingmen's Compensation Act (Kern–McGillicuddy Act) of 1916 extended accident compensation to all civilian employees of the federal government.
- According to one senator, much had been done for the benefit of labor during Wilson's first term, arguing that "It is now freely admitted by independent thinkers that more constructive legislation of real benefit to the people at large has been enacted during the three and a half years of President Wilson's administration than during the forty years that have gone before." The same senator has argued that one of "the many significant acts of President Wilson which will bring large relief to the united workers is the result of the hearings of the United States Commission on Industrial Relations whose members lie appointed, with Frank P. Walsh of Kansas City as its chairman. This commission went extensively into the underlying conditions which affect vitally the wage earners of the nation and has published reports and the evidence which will be of incalculable benefit." In addition, "The Federal Government in the administration of the laws, are engaged more assiduously than ever in assisting the States and employers by studying carefully the problems of mines and the protection of workingmen in mines. The general system of protection in factories is also a matter of concern to the officers in the Federal Government and it stands ready to assist any community or employer to put into operation the most approved methods of protection."
- The Keating–Owen Act
- The Kern Resolution of 1913.
- The Saboth Act of 1913.
- The Newlands Labor Act of 1913.
- The Federal Boiler Inspection Act of 1915.
- The Occupancy Permits Act of 1915.
- The Fraudulent Advertising Act of 1916.
- The Merchant Marine Act of 1920.
- The Esch–Cummins Act of 1920.

=== Health and welfare ===
- According to one study, Wilson's administration 'had laid the foundation for a "welfare state" by providing for the matching of federal funds with those of the states to equalize certain facilities through the nation; new taxes had been levied to make this possible.'
- A Democratic campaign text-book from 1916 emphasized various initiatives in public health under Wilson. During its first term the Wilson administration's "took up the question of sanitary conditions in rural communities for the protection of the health of farmers." According to one estimate typhoid fever was reduced by 80%, while in some localities the Public Health Service made investigations. It was also estimated that other studies had reduced the prevalence of malaria as much as 50 per cent." During Wilson's first term extensive investigations were inaugurated by the Public Health Service of the occupational hazards of industry. An industrial laboratory, for instance, "has been equipped in the Pittsburgh district for the study and prevention of occupational and industrial diseases and thorough investigations have been made elsewhere of the occupational risks of various industries." The hazards of miners were also investigated and the methods to be adopted for the improvement of hygienic conditions and the better sanitation of mines were outlined and followed, "such, for instance, as the prevention of tuberculosis among the zinc miners of Missouri. In many other instances it has been possible to recommend and adopt measures which have led to a reduction in illness and the saving of many lives."
- The Cutter Service Act of 1914
- The Federal Aid Road Act of 1916
- The Rural Post Roads Act of 1916
- The Sundry Civil Appropriations Act authorized $200,000 for the newly formed Division of Scientific Research for the United States Public Health Service.
- An Act of June 24, 1914 provided for the furnishing of medical aid to fishing crews.
- An Act was passed (1916) authorizing hospital and medical services to government employees injured at work.
- An anti-narcotics law was passed (1914).
- A federal bill setting minimum housing standards in the District of Columbia was passed (1914), the result of efforts by President Wilson's first wife Ellen Wilson.
- An Act of October 22, 1914, provided that "where the wife of a homestead settler or entryman, while residing upon the homestead claim and prior to the submission of final proof, has been abandoned and deserted by her husband for more than 1 year, she may submit proof (by way of commutation or otherwise), on the entry and secure patent in her own name, being allowed credit for all residence and cultivation had and improvements made, either by herself or by her husband."
- Health benefits and disability insurance were introduced for lighthouse keepers (1916).
- A cooperative Federal-State program of cash grants for public health services was established (1917).
- According to a 1914 report, "Owing to additional authority and larger appropriations granted, the year just ended marks the beginning of a new epoch in the development of investigations of public health matters. These investigations, either newly begun or enlarged, have related to diseases of man, rural sanitation, school hygiene, industrial hygiene, sanitary organization and administration, pollution of navigable waters, and disposal of sewage and wastes."
- An Act of June 23, 1913, authorized the use of the "epidemic fund" for trachoma prevention.
- A system of life insurance and medical care for federal employees was initiated.
- The Harrison Narcotic Act (1914) required prescriptions for products exceeding the allowable limit of narcotics and mandated "increased record-keeping for physicians and pharmacists who dispense narcotics."
- In 1916 funds were appropriated by Congress for studies in rural sanitation "formally establishing cooperation between the States and Public Health Service."
- The Children's Bureau was appointed by President Wilson, the efforts of which were directed toward ascertaining the relations between poverty, disease and mortality.
- In 1918, the first Federal grants to States for public health services were made available.
- A retirement plan for lightkeepers was introduced (1918).
- In 1918, the first federal loans were offered to shipbuilding companies to house their workers.
- A federal leprosy hospital was authorized (1917).
- Congress extended "the use of the special fund and authorizing acceptance of gifts under the Rehabilitation of Disabled Soldiers' Act."
- Legislation provided six months' gratuity to dependents of deceased sailors in the navy.
- The Civil Service Retirement System was established (1920) to provide pensions to retired civilian federal employees.
- The Death on the High Seas Act (1920) aimed at compensating the wives of sailors who had died at sea. The legislation enabled survivors "to recover pecuniary damages, or the lost wages of their relatives on whom they depended upon financially."
- Corporate welfare work was encouraged by the Wilson Administration.

=== Wartime measures ===
- A National War Labor Board was established, which improved working conditions in factories by insisting on an eight-hour workday, no child labor, and better safety conditions.
- In 1918, the Working Conditions Services was established, which sought to "improve working conditions for defense workers during the war." This was the first federal agency to promote occupational safety.
- The United States Housing Corporation was established (1918) to build housing projects for wartime workers.
- The Soldiers' and Sailors' Civil Relief Act of 1918
- The Cantonment Adjustment Commission established boards to handle labor relations problems during the war, which led to widespread use of the prevailing wage by the federal government. According to one study, "This also marked the first time that the federal government used contracts to institute social change."
- On the anniversary of the United States' entry into the war (6 April 1918), the Children's Bureau, funded with $150,000 from the President's Defense Appropriation, launched a national health education program called "Children's Year." This campaign, which was repeated the following year, provided information "on the feeding and care of babies for their mothers and involved the weighing and measuring of some six million infants." The effects of the campaign were not temporary, as various states set up child hygiene divisions in their public health departments, and the state of California itself established 22 permanent health centres as a result of the bureau's initiative. This program led to the postwar passage of the 1921 Sheppard-Towner Act, which also came about, according to one study, "largely as a result of the stimulus provided by the second White House Conference on Child Welfare, called by President Woodrow Wilson in 1919."

=== Veterans ===
- The War Risk Insurance Act of 1914.
- The War Risk Insurance Act of 1917.
- The Rehabilitation Law of 1919 provided disabled veterans with tuition, books, and a monthly subsistence allowance of between $90 and $145.
- In 1917 and 1918 legislation was passed by Congress to provide funding for farm colonies for disabled soldiers, and colonies were established by the Veteran's Bureau in Montana, South Dakota, North Dakota and Minnesota. According to one study however, "like so many other domestic colonial schemes they did not succeed for long."
- The Public Health Service was made directly responsible for the hospitalization of veterans under the War Risk Insurance Act (1919).
- During Wilson's first term pension amendments were signed into law "that provided more liberal provisions to war widows, especially those who had married after 1890 and whose husbands had not died from causes originating from military service."
- The Smith-Sears Vocational Rehabilitation Act (1918) supported programs to help veterans with disabilities return to civilian employment following the end of the First World War.
- The Bureau of War Risk Insurance was set up to provide direct assistance to the families of soldiers. By the end of the First World War, the bureau was sending regular checks to 2.1 million families.

=== Education ===
- The 1914 Smith–Lever Act tied vocational education in home economics and agriculture to the land-grant college system.
- The Smith–Hughes Vocational Education Act extended the Smith-Lever provisions of 1914 and supported teacher training and other instruction in industrial occupations, home economics, and agriculture.
- The Civilian Vocational Rehabilitation Act of 1920 (Smith-Fess Act) authorized a joint federal-state vocational rehabilitation program for handicapped civilians.
- Under the Industry Vocational Rehabilitation Act of 1920 (Smith-Bankhead Act), Congress began providing federal funds for cooperation with the states in the vocational rehabilitation of persons disabled in industry.

=== Constitutional ===
- The Jones Act (Philippines) of 1916
- The Jones-Shafroth Act 1917 bestowed US citizenship upon the people of Puerto Rico.
- The Sixteenth Amendment to the United States Constitution created the federal income tax.
- The Seventeenth Amendment to the United States Constitution provided for the direct election of senators, who had previously been chosen by their state legislatures.
- The Nineteenth Amendment to the United States Constitution was passed (1920), granting women the right to vote.
- Mother's Day was made an official national holiday (1914).

=== Environment and public works ===
- The River and Harbors Act of 1914
- The River and Harbors Act of 1915
- The River and Harbors Act of 1916
- The Irrigation District Act of 1916 (Smith Act)
- The Flood Control Act of 1917 (Ransdell-Humphreys Act)
- The Federal Water Power Act of 1920 (Esch Act)

=== Conservation ===
- A federal act established the National Park Service, bringing together the many historical sites, monuments, and national parks into one agency.
- The Glacier National Park Act of 1914.
- The Wildlife Game Refuges Act of 1916.
- The Acadia National Park Act of 1919.
- The Grand Canyon Park Act of 1919.

== Books ==
In 1913 Woodrow Wilson's book The New Freedom was published, detailing his thoughts about the concepts and program. He had previously written two other books, Congressional Government published in 1900, followed in 1901 by When a Man Comes to Himself.

== See also ==
- Square Deal
- New Nationalism (Theodore Roosevelt)
- New Deal
- Fair Deal
