= Reed Amendment =

Reed Amendment may refer to one of the following amendments to United States laws:

- Reed Amendment (alcohol) to the Webb-Kenyon Act of 1913, sponsored by Sen. James A. Reed (D-MO)
- Reed Amendment (immigration) to the Illegal Immigration Reform and Immigrant Responsibility Act of 1996, sponsored by Sen. Jack Reed (D-RI)
- Titles of Nobility Amendment, proposed amendment to the United States Constitution sponsored by Sen. Philip Reed of Maryland in 1810
- The Levin-Reed Amendment to the National Defense Authorization Act for Fiscal Year 2008
