= Brush Disposal Act of 1916 =

- Long title: An Act Making appropriations for the Department of Agriculture for the fiscal year ending June thirtieth, nineteen hundred and seventeen, and for other purposes.
- Enacted by: the 64th United States Congress
- Effective: August 11, 1916

Citations
- Statutes at Large: 39 Stat. 462

Legislative history
- Signed into law by President Woodrow Wilson on August 11, 1916

Major amendments
- Granger-Thye Act of 1950 (64 Stat. 84)

The Brush Disposal Act of 1916, was a federal legislative act of the United States. It stipulated that private timber company purchasers of United States National Forest timber be required by the U.S. Secretary of Agriculture to deposit the estimated cost of brush and debris removal resulting from their cutting operations with a special fund at the U.S. Treasury which would remain available until expended.
