= Smith Act trial =

Smith Act trial may refer to:

- Smith Act legal proceedings
- Smith Act trials of Communist Party leaders

== See also ==
- Irrigation District Act of 1916 (Smith Act)
- Debbie Smith Act
- Smith–Lever Act of 1914
