= Tinsley W. Rucker Jr. =

American politician

Member of the U.S. House of Representatives from Georgia's 8th district
- In office January 11, 1917 – March 3, 1917
- Preceded by: Samuel J. Tribble
- Succeeded by: Charles H. Brand

Personal details
- Born: March 24, 1848 Elbert County, Georgia
- Died: November 18, 1926 (aged 78) Athens, Georgia
- Party: Democratic
- Education: Princeton College; Georgia Military Academy; University of Georgia School of Law

Tinsley White Rucker Jr. (March 24, 1848 – November 18, 1926) was an American politician, soldier and lawyer.

== Life ==
Rucker was born near Farm Hill, Georgia in Elbert County and attended Princeton College and the Georgia Military Academy. He joined the Confederate Army during the Civil War on March 24, 1864, and served until the war's conclusion.

After the war, Rucker attended the University of Georgia School of Law in Athens where he was a member of the Phi Kappa Literary Society and graduated in 1868. He was admitted to the state bar in 1871 and began practice in Athens.

In 1893, President Grover Cleveland appointed Rucker as assistant United States district attorney for the northern district of Georgia. In 1912, he returned to practicing law in Athens. Upon the death of Georgia's federal representative for the 8th district, Samuel J. Tribble, Rucker won the special election as a Democrat to fill the remainder of the term for that seat in the 64th United States Congress and served from January 11, 1917, until March 3, 1917. He did not seek re-election in 1916 and returned to the practice of law. Rucker's legal career is noted in studies of Georgia's nineteenth-century judiciary.

Rucker died on November 18, 1926, in Athens, Georgia and was buried in Oconee Hill Cemetery.

U.S. House of Representatives
Preceded by Samuel J. Tribble	Member of the U.S. House of Representatives from Georgia's 8th congressional district January 11, 1917 – March 3, 1917	Succeeded by Charles H. Brand
