= Post Office Appropriation Act of 1916 =

- Long title: An Act Making appropriations for the service of the Post Office Department for the fiscal year ending June thirtieth, nineteen hindred and seventeen, and for other purposes.
- Enacted by: the 64th United States Congress

Citations
- Statutes at Large: 39 Stat. 412

Legislative history
- Introduced in the House as H.R. 10484

The public Act number 169, sometimes called the Post Office Appropriation Act of 1916 or 1917 or the Post Office Department Appropriation Act, was an Act of the 64th United States Congress, which was passed on 28 July 1916, and which related to the fiscal year 1917. This Act was chapter 261 of the First Session of the 64th Congress. The Bill for this Act was H.R. 10484. The Act was part of United States federal law.

== Section 5 ==
This provisions of this section, sometimes known as the Space Basis Act or the Railway Mail Service Pay Act authorized the Interstate Commerce Commission to determine fair and reasonable rates of compensation to be paid, upon a space basis, for the transportation of mail and any service connected therewith.

The 1916 Annual Report of the Long Island Rail Road stated:

The Post Office Appropriation Act for 1916 provided for the final settlement of the railway mail pay question by the Interstate Commerce Commission. Space basis on trial was inaugurated November 1, 1916, resulting in an increase in mail pay on your line of about $30,000 per annum. This is subject to fluctuations due to changes being made by the Postmaster General in the authorized space. A complete record of mail handled and service performed will be taken between March 27 and April 30, 1917, and the facts submitted to the Interstate Commerce Commission, which will then pass final judgment upon the method for computing compensation for mail service and the rate of compensation.
