= Paul Brown (Georgia politician) =

American politician (1880–1961)

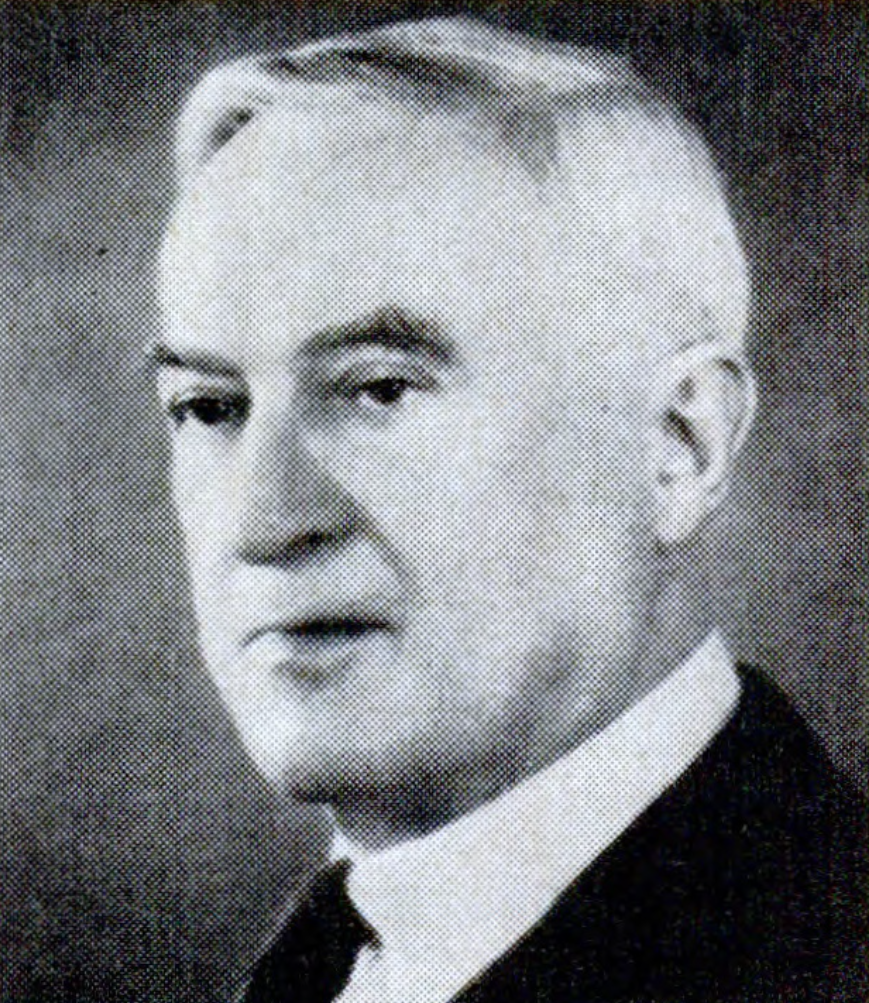

Member of the U.S. House of Representatives from Georgia's 10th district
- In office July 5, 1933 – January 3, 1961
- Preceded by: Charles H. Brand
- Succeeded by: Robert G. Stephens Jr.

Member of the Georgia House of Representatives from Oglethorpe County
- In office 1907–1909
- Preceded by: Nathaniel D. Arnold
- Succeeded by: J. P. Armistead

Personal details
- Born: March 31, 1880 Hartwell, Georgia, U.S.
- Died: September 24, 1961 (aged 81) Elberton, Georgia, U.S.
- Education: University of Georgia (LLB)
- Occupation: Lawyer; politician

Paul Brown (March 31, 1880 – September 24, 1961) was an American politician and lawyer, who served in the United States House of Representatives.

Brown was born in Hartwell in the U.S. state of Georgia, and graduated from the University of Georgia School of Law in Athens with a Bachelor of Laws (LLB) degree in 1901. He was admitted to the state bar in that year and began practicing law in Lexington, Georgia. He farmed and also served as the Mayor of Lexington from 1908 to 1914. Brown served in the Georgia House of Representatives in 1907 and 1908.

In 1920, Brown moved to Elberton, Georgia in Elbert County and served as that county's attorney from 1928 to 1933. In 1932, he was a delegate to the 1932 Democratic National Convention. The next year Brown successfully ran in a special election to fill the vacant seat in Georgia's 10th congressional district in the United States House of Representatives caused by the death of incumbent Charles Hillyer Brand. Brown finished the rest of that term in the 73rd United States Congress and was reelected to 13 additional terms in that position.

A staunch segregationist, in 1956, Brown signed the Southern Manifesto.

In 1960, he did not seek reelection. Brown died the next year on September 24, 1961, in Elberton and was buried in that city's Elmhurst Cemetery.

== See also ==
- Politics of the United States

U.S. House of Representatives
Preceded by Charles Hillyer Brand	Member of the U.S. House of Representatives from Georgia's 10th congressional district July 5, 1933 – January 3, 1961	Succeeded by Robert Grier Stephens, Jr.
