= Irrigation districts in the United States =

Local government entity in the United States

In the United States an irrigation district is a cooperative, self-governing public corporation set up as a subdivision of the State government, with definite geographic boundaries, organized, and having taxing power to obtain and distribute water for irrigation of lands within the district; created under the authority of a State legislature with the consent of a designated fraction of the landowners or citizens.

It is a special-purpose district created by statute in order to develop large irrigation projects. These districts have the power to tax, borrow, and condemn.

== Sample districts ==
State	District	Founded	Notes
California	Fresno Irrigation District	1920	Distribution canals in the Fresno County
California	Imperial Irrigation District	1911	Distribution canals in the Imperial Valley
California	Turlock Irrigation District	1887	First Irrigation District in California
California	Merced Irrigation District	1919	Distribution canals in the Merced County
California	Nevada Irrigation District	1921	Nevada County and portions of Placer and Yuba Counties
California	South San Joaquin Irrigation District	1909	Southern San Joaquin County
California	Westlands Water District	1952	San Joaquin, Kings, and Fresno Counties
Nevada	Truckee–Carson Irrigation District	1918	Supports agriculture in Lyon County and Churchill County
New Mexico	Carlsbad Irrigation District	1949	Declared a National Historic Landmark in 1964
New Mexico	Middle Rio Grande Conservancy District	1925	Rio Grande in the Albuquerque Basin section
Ohio	Miami Conservancy District	1914	Great Miami River and its tributaries
Ohio	Muskingum Watershed Conservancy District	1933	Muskingum River Watershed
Oregon	Central Oregon Irrigation District	1918	Provides irrigation water for Central Oregon
Oregon	Tumalo Irrigation District	1922	Provides irrigation water for Tumalo
Utah	Jordan Valley Water Conservancy District	1951	Mainly operates in Salt Lake County. Called Salt Lake County Water Conservancy District until 1999
Washington	Quincy-Columbia Basin Irrigation District	1910	Delivers irrigation water to farmland in the Columbia Basin

== See also ==
- Deficit irrigation
- Environmental effects of irrigation
- Huerta
- Irrigation methods
- Irrigation District Act of 1916 (Smith Act)
- Irrigation Districts and Farm Loans Act
- Water district
