= Terminal Inspection Act of 1916 =

American postal law

- Other short titles: Terminal Inspection Act of 1915
- Long title: An Act Making appropriations for the Department of Agriculture for the fiscal year ending June thirtieth, nineteen hundred and sixteen
- Enacted by: the 63rd United States Congress
- Effective: March 4, 1915

Citations
- Public law: Public Law 63-144
- Statutes at Large: 38 Stat. 1113

Codification
- Acts amended: Plant Quarantine Act of 1912
- U.S.C. sections created: 7 U.S.C. § 7760

Legislative history
- Introduced in the House of Representatives as H.R. 20415 by Asbury Francis Lever (D‑SC) on January 11, 1915; Committee consideration by House Committee on Agriculture; Passed the House of Representatives on February 1, 1915 (Voice vote); Passed the Senate on February 25, 1915 (43–15); Reported by the joint conference committee on February 26 – March 3, 1915; agreed to by the House of Representatives on March 3, 1915 (220–103) and by the Senate on March 3, 1915 (Voice vote); Signed into law by President Woodrow Wilson on March 4, 1915

Major amendments
- Act of June 4, 1936 (49 Stat. 1461)

The Terminal Inspection Act of 1916 was a part of the Rural Post Roads Act of 1916. It prohibited a person from sending, through the U.S. mail to a state address, a package containing a plant or plant product unless the package's contents were plainly marked. The act was one of the earliest legal forms of early detection of and rapid response to invasive species.
