= Cotton Futures Act of 1916 =

United States federal law

- Other short titles: Agricultural Appropriations Act of 1917; Cotton Futures Amendments; Grain Standards Act; Grain Grades Amendment
- Long title: An Act making appropriations for the Department of Agriculture for the fiscal year ending June thirtieth, nineteen hundred and seventeen, and for other purposes.
- Enacted by: the 64th United States Congress
- Effective: August 11, 1916

Citations
- Public law: Pub. L. 64–190
- Statutes at Large: 39 Stat. 476

Codification
- Titles amended: 7 U.S.C.: Agriculture
- U.S.C. sections amended: 7 U.S.C. ch. 1 § 15b

Legislative history
- Introduced in the House as H.R. 12717; Committee consideration by House Agriculture Committee, Senate Agriculture and Forestry Committee; Passed the House on April 28, 1916 (184-136); Passed the Senate on July 5, 1916 (30-28); Reported by the joint conference committee on August 3, 1916; agreed to by the House on August 3, 1916 (Passed) and by the Senate on August 3, 1916 (34-25); Signed into law by President Woodrow Wilson on August 11, 1916

The Cotton Futures Act of 1916 required the principal, meaning the exact type and grade of cotton, be given to the government upon sale at a cotton exchange, so that the USDA could keep track of what was being grown and where. It replaced the Cotton Futures Act of 1914, which was ruled unconstitutional.
