= Charles H. Brand =

American politician

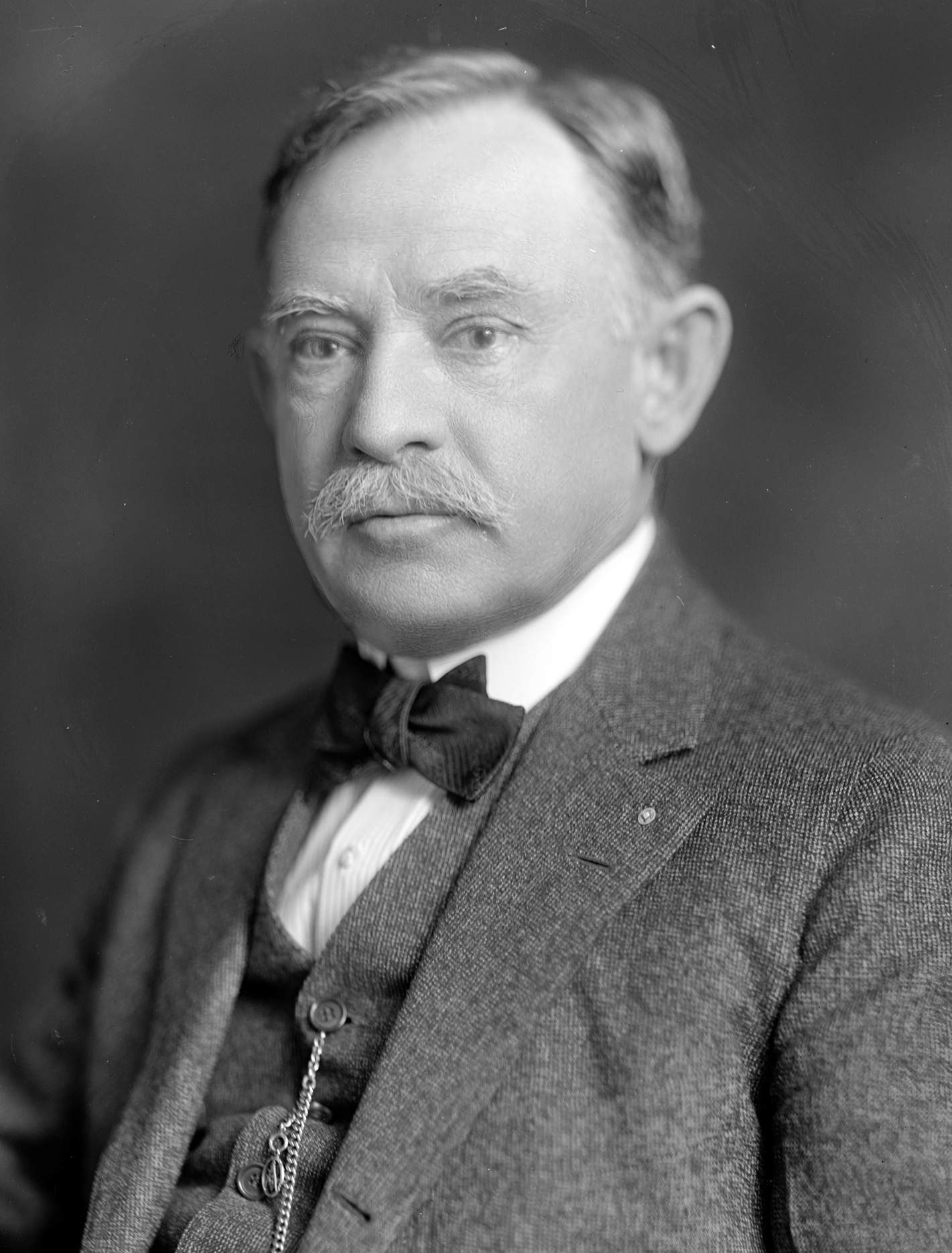

Member of the U.S. House of Representatives from Georgia
- In office March 4, 1917 – May 17, 1933
- Preceded by: Tinsley W. Rucker, Jr.
- Succeeded by: Paul Brown
- Constituency: 8th district (1917–1933); 10th district (1933)

Personal details
- Born: Charles Hillyer Brand; April 20, 1861 Loganville, Georgia, U.S.
- Died: May 17, 1933 (aged 72) Athens, Georgia, U.S.
- Party: Democratic

Charles Hillyer Brand (April 20, 1861 – May 17, 1933) was an American politician, businessman, jurist and lawyer.

== Biography ==
Brand was born in Loganville, Georgia and graduated from the University of Georgia in Athens in 1881. He was admitted to the state bar in 1882.

In 1894 and 1895, Brand served in the Georgia Senate and was the president pro tempore of that body. Brand was also involved in the banking industry as president and director of the Brand Banking Co. in Lawrenceville, Georgia, director of the Georgia National Bank and of the American State Bank in Athens. Brand was the solicitor general of the western district of Georgia from 1896 through 1904 and succeeded Richard B. Russell, Sr. as the judge of the state superior court in 1906. He served in that position until 1917. On June 27, 1911, a Walton County mob of several hundred unmasked white men lynched two Black men named Tom Allen and Joe Watts after a local white judge—Charles H. Brand—refused to allow state guardsmen to be present to prevent mob action. Three months earlier, in Judge Brand’s hometown of Lawrenceville in Gwinnett County, he had also refused the assistance of state troops to protect a Black man named Charles Hale, who, left without the protection of those troops, was taken by a white mob and lynched.

Brand was then elected as a Democratic representative of Georgia's 8th congressional district in the 65th United States Congress and served seven consecutive terms in that district. After congressional apportionment in 1932, Brand successfully ran for an eighth term in Georgia's newly redrawn 10th congressional district. He died in Athens while still in office and was buried in Shadow Lawn Cemetery in Lawrenceville, Georgia.

== See also ==
- List of members of the United States Congress who died in office (1900–1949)

U.S. House of Representatives
Preceded by Tinsley W. Rucker, Jr.	Member of the U.S. House of Representatives from Georgia's 8th congressional district March 4, 1917 – March 3, 1933	Succeeded by Braswell Deen
Preceded by Carl Vinson	Member of the U.S. House of Representatives from Georgia's 10th congressional district March 4, 1933 – May 17, 1933	Succeeded by Paul Brown
