= SS A. Frank Lever =

WWII Liberty Ship

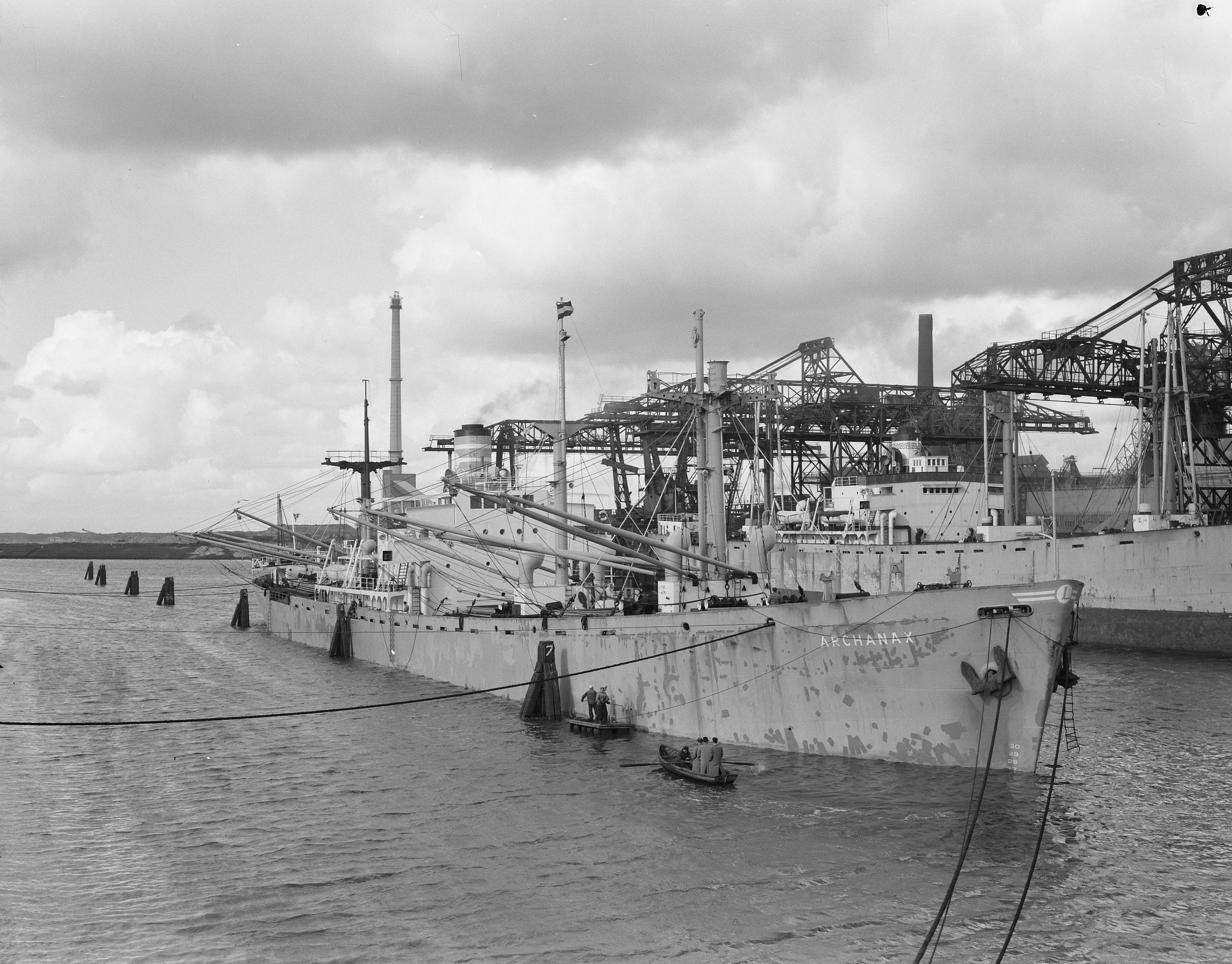
- SS Archanax

History

United States
- Name: A. Frank Lever
- Namesake: Asbury Francis Lever
- Operator: States Marine Lines, Inc.
- Builder: Southeastern SB Corp., Savannah, Georgia
- Cost: USD 1,293,168
- Yard number: 34
- Way number: 2
- Laid down: 29 October 1943
- Launched: 7 December 1943
- Completed: 21 December 1943
- Fate: Scrapped

General characteristics
- Class & type: Liberty ship; type EC2-S-C1, standard
- Tonnage: 10,865 LT DWT; 7,176 GRT
- Displacement: 3,380 long tons (3,434 t) (light); 14,245 long tons (14,474 t) (max)
- Length: 441 feet 6 inches (135 m) oa; 416 feet (127 m) pp; 427 feet (130 m) lwl
- Beam: 57 feet (17 m)
- Draft: 27 ft 9.25 in (8.4646 m)
- Installed power: 2 × Oil fired 450 °F (232 °C) boilers, operating at 220 psi (1,500 kPa); 2,500 hp (1,900 kW)
- Propulsion: 1 × triple-expansion steam engine, (manufactured by Vulcan Iron Works, Wilkes-Barre, Pennsylvania); 1 × screw propeller
- Speed: 11.5 knots (21.3 km/h; 13.2 mph)
- Capacity: 562,608 cubic feet (15,931 m^{3}) (grain); 499,573 cubic feet (14,146 m^{3}) (bale)
- Complement: 38–62 USMM; 21–40 USNAG
- Armament: Varied by ship; Bow-mounted 3-inch (76 mm)/50-caliber gun; Stern-mounted 4-inch (102 mm)/50-caliber gun; 2–8 × single 20-millimeter (0.79 in) Oerlikon anti-aircraft (AA) cannons and/or, 2–8 × 37-millimeter (1.46 in) M1 AA guns

SS A. Frank Lever was a Liberty ship built in the United States during World War II. Her namesake was A. Francis "Frank" Lever. Her sponsor was Mrs. A. Frank Lever.

== History ==
A. Frank Lever was a Liberty ship, Maritime Commission hull number 1072, built during World War II and named for United States Senator and Clemson Agricultural College of South Carolina Life Trustee, Asbury Francis Lever, who died 28 April 1940.

Liberty ships were a mass-produced wartime design. Eighteen American shipyards built 2,751 Libertys between 1941 and 1945, easily the largest number of ships produced to a single design. Originally a British design, the U.S. version was designated 'EC2-S-C1': 'EC' for Emergency Cargo, '2' for a ship between 400 and 450 feet (120 and 140 m) long (Load Waterline Length), 'S' for steam engines, and 'C1' for design C1. The new design replaced much riveting, which accounted for one-third of the labor costs, with welding, and featured oil-fired boilers.

The first of these new ships was launched on 27 September 1941. She was named Patrick Henry after the American Revolutionary War patriot who had famously declared, "Give me liberty, or give me death." Consequently, all the EC2 type of emergency cargo ships came to be known as Liberty ships.

The cargo vessel A. Frank Lever, was constructed at the yards of the Southeastern Shipbuilding Corporation, Savannah, Georgia, one of 88 Libertys the yard built. Laid down on Way number 2 with Yard number 34, on 29 October 1943, she was launched on 7 December 1943. Mrs. A. Frank Lever was sponsor for the new ship. The new vessel was delivered on 21 December 1943.

Designed to be turned out at utmost speed, the Kaiser Permanente Metals Corp. No. 2 Yard in Richmond, California, set the record for constructing a Liberty ship when it built Robert E. Peary, from keel laying to launching, in 4 days 15 hours and 30 minutes, 8–12 November 1942. Robert E. Peary was then outfitted, painted, taken on sea trials, and the vessel fully loaded with 10,000 tons of cargo. Robert E. Peary sailed seven days after her keel was laid. More than 2,400 Liberty ships survived the war, only 196 having been lost in combat. Of these, 835 made up the postwar cargo fleet. Greek entrepreneurs bought 526 ships and Italian ones bought 98.

In 1943, the new vessel was owned by the War Shipping Administration and operated by States Marine Lines, Inc. of New York. She was one of 51 ships in "Convoy HX 278" that departed New York, on 5 February 1944, arriving in Liverpool on 20 February 1944. Her cargo was listed as "General". In May–June 1944, she was part of the vast fleet of vessels assembled (6,939 ships, boats and amphibious craft) for "Operation Neptune", the maritime portion of "Operation Overlord", the 6 June 1944, D-Day invasion of Occupied France. This will likely remain the greatest number of vessels ever assembled.

Post-war, A. Frank Lever was sold abroad in 1947, being renamed Brott, Skibs A/S Vard (Jacobsen & Salvesen, Oslo), and reflagged for Norway. She went to Henriksens Rederi A/S (Dagfin Hendriksen, Oslo) in 1948. She was renamed Finnborg, operated by A/S Norfinn (Jorgen Krag, Oslo) in 1951. Sold to Liberian interests in 1954, she was renamed Archanax, by Liberian Sea Transport Corp, Liberia (G.M.Livanos, New York). In 1967 she became the Mistral with Delta Marine Corp, Liberia (Scio Shipping Inc, New York). The former SS A. Frank Lever was scrapped at Kaohsiung, Taiwan, in 1968.

== Chronology ==
- 1943 WSA (States Marine Corp., New York)
- 1947 BROTT, Skibs A/S Vard (Jacobsen & Salvesen, Oslo)- Norwegian flag.
- 1948 Henriksens Rederi A/S (Dagfin Hendriksen, Oslo)
- 1951 FINNBORG, A/S Norfinn (Jorgen Krag, Oslo)
- 1954 ARCHANAX, Liberian Sea Transport Corp, Liberia (G.M.Livanos, New York).
- 1967 MISTRAL, Delta Marine Corp, Liberia (Scio Shipping Inc, New York)
- 1968 Scrapped Taiwan.
