= Wildlife Game Refuges Act of 1916 =

- Other short titles: Wildlife Game Refuges Act of August 11, 1916
- Long title: An Act Making appropriations for the Department of Agriculture for the fiscal year ending June thirtieth, nineteen hundred and seventeen, and for other purposes
- Enacted by: the 64th United States Congress
- Effective: August 11, 1916

Citations
- Public law: Public Law 64-190
- Statutes at Large: 39 Stat. 446

Codification
- Acts amended: Weeks Act of 1911
- U.S.C. sections created: 16 U.S.C. § 683

Legislative history
- Introduced in the House of Representatives as H.R. 12717 by Asbury Francis Lever (D‑SC) on March 6, 1916; Committee consideration by House Committee on Agriculture; Passed the House of Representatives on April 17, 1916 (Voice vote); Passed the Senate on July 12, 1916 (Voice vote); Reported by the joint conference committee on July 14 – August 8, 1916; agreed to by the House of Representatives on August 9, 1916 (Voice vote) and by the Senate on August 10, 1916 (Voice vote); Signed into law by President Woodrow Wilson on August 11, 1916

The Wildlife Game Refuges Act of 1916 placed aside certain United States Federal park lands as nature reserves free from hunting and poaching, and placed the United States Forest Service in charge of enforcing such provisions. The purpose was to increase the total big-game population (both inside and outside the game refuges), using the ecological principle of refuges.

== See also ==
- Game reserve
- Refuge (ecology)
