= Irrigation Districts and Farm Loans Act =

- Long title: An Act to provide for the application of the reclamation law to irrigation districts.
- Enacted by: the 67th United States Congress
- Effective: May 15, 1922

Citations
- Public law: 67-219
- Statutes at Large: 42 Stat. 541

Legislative history
- Introduced in the House as H.R. 4382 by John E. Raker (D–CA) on October 21, 1921; Committee consideration by House Irrigation of Arid Lands, Senate Irrigation and Reclamation; Passed the House on March 8, 1922 (287-10); Passed the Senate on April 22, 1922 (Passed); Reported by the joint conference committee on April 27, 1922; agreed to by the Senate on May 5, 1922 (Agreed) and by the House on May 8, 1922 (243-18); Signed into law by President Warren G. Harding on May 15, 1922

Sponsored by Democratic Party Congressional representative for California John E. Raker, the Irrigation Districts and Farm Loans Act, also known as the Raker Act, required that a court of competent jurisdiction confirm contracts between the Secretary of the Interior and locally formed irrigation districts to ensure that the districts had the necessary authority before the contracts became binding. It was proposed and discussed in Washington, D.C. from March 4, 1921, to March 4, 1923, during the Sixty-seventh United States Congress meeting of the legislative branch of the United States federal government, consisting of the United States Senate and the United States House of Representatives, during the first two years of Warren Harding's presidency. The Act became law on May 15, 1922.

== See also ==
- Newlands Reclamation Act
- Pittman Underground Water Act
