= Kern Amendment =

- Long title: An Act To amend section eight of an Act entitled "An Act to supplement existing laws against unlawful restraints and monopolies, and for other purposes," approved October fifteenth, nineteen hundred and fourteen.
- Enacted by: the 64th United States Congress
- Effective: May 15, 1916

Citations
- Statutes at Large: 39 Stat. 121

Codification
- Acts amended: Clayton Antitrust Act of 1914

Legislative history
- Introduced in the Senate as S. 4432 by John W. Kern; Signed into law by President Woodrow Wilson on May 15, 1916

Major amendments
- Act of May 26, 1920 (41 Stat. 626); Banking Act of 1935 (49 Stat. 717)

Sponsored by Sen. John W. Kern (D) of Indiana, the Kern Amendment amended the Clayton Anti-Trust Act of 1914 by forbidding a Director, officer, or employee of any Reserve Bank having resources in excess of $5,000,000 acting in any similar capacity in another bank; however, it allowed an officer of a FED member bank, with the consent of the Federal Reserve Board, to hold a similar post in two other banks provided they were not in substantial competition with the member bank. In essence, the amendment lessened the prohibition against interlocking directorates dictated by the Clayton Act originally scheduled to go into effect on Oct. 15th, 1916.
