= Army Appropriations Act of 1916 =

In United States federal legislation, the Army Appropriations Act of 1916 authorized money for the larger troop strength, and created the Council of National Defense (CND) which established communications and information sharing between military and industrial leaders.

The CND was a Cabinet committee with an Advisory Commission of prominent citizens working without pay. It was initially made up of 1) Walter S. Gifford, its Chairman, and a statistician with American Telephone and Telegraph Company (AT&T), 2) Howard E. Coffin, the Vice-President of the Hudson Motor Car Company, 3) Bernard Baruch, Wall Street financier, 4) Hollis Godfrey, the President of the Drexel Institute of Philadelphia, 5) Daniel Willard, the President of the Baltimore & Ohio Railroad (B&O), 6) Julius Rosenwald, the President of Sears, Roebuck and Company, 6) Samuel Gompers, the President of the American Federation of Labor (AFL), and 7) Dr. Franklin H. Martin, the Secretary-General of the American College of Surgeons. It was the 1st peacetime collusion of military and industrial leaders, laying the initial groundwork for the modern U.S. military–industrial complex.
