= Fraudulent Advertising Act of 1916 =

- Other short titles: Fraudulent Advertising Act (D.C.)
- Long title: An Act To prevent fraudulent advertising in the District of Columbia
- Enacted by: the 64th United States Congress
- Effective: May 29, 1916

Citations
- Public law: Public Law 64-130
- Statutes at Large: 39 Stat. 165

Codification
- U.S.C. sections created: D.C. Code § 22-1511

Legislative history
- Signed into law by President Woodrow Wilson on May 29, 1916

The Fraudulent Advertising Act of 1916 (May 29, 1916, 39 Stat. 165, ch. 130, § 1.), forbade businesses and advertisers to make deliberately misleading and fraudulent statements about the goods they were selling within the District of Columbia.
