= Granger-Thye Act of 1950 =

Act of Congress

Citations
- Statutes at Large: P.L. 81-478

The Granger-Thye Act of 1950 (P.L. 81-478) in the United States established a new direction for some aspects of National Forest System management; authorized the use of grazing fee receipts for rangeland improvement; authorized the Forest Service to issue grazing permits for terms up to 10 years; authorized the Forest Service to participate in funding cooperative forestry and rangeland resource improvements; established grazing advisory boards; and, authorized the Forest Service to assist with work on private forest lands.
