= Samuel J. Tribble =

American politician

Samuel Joelah Tribble
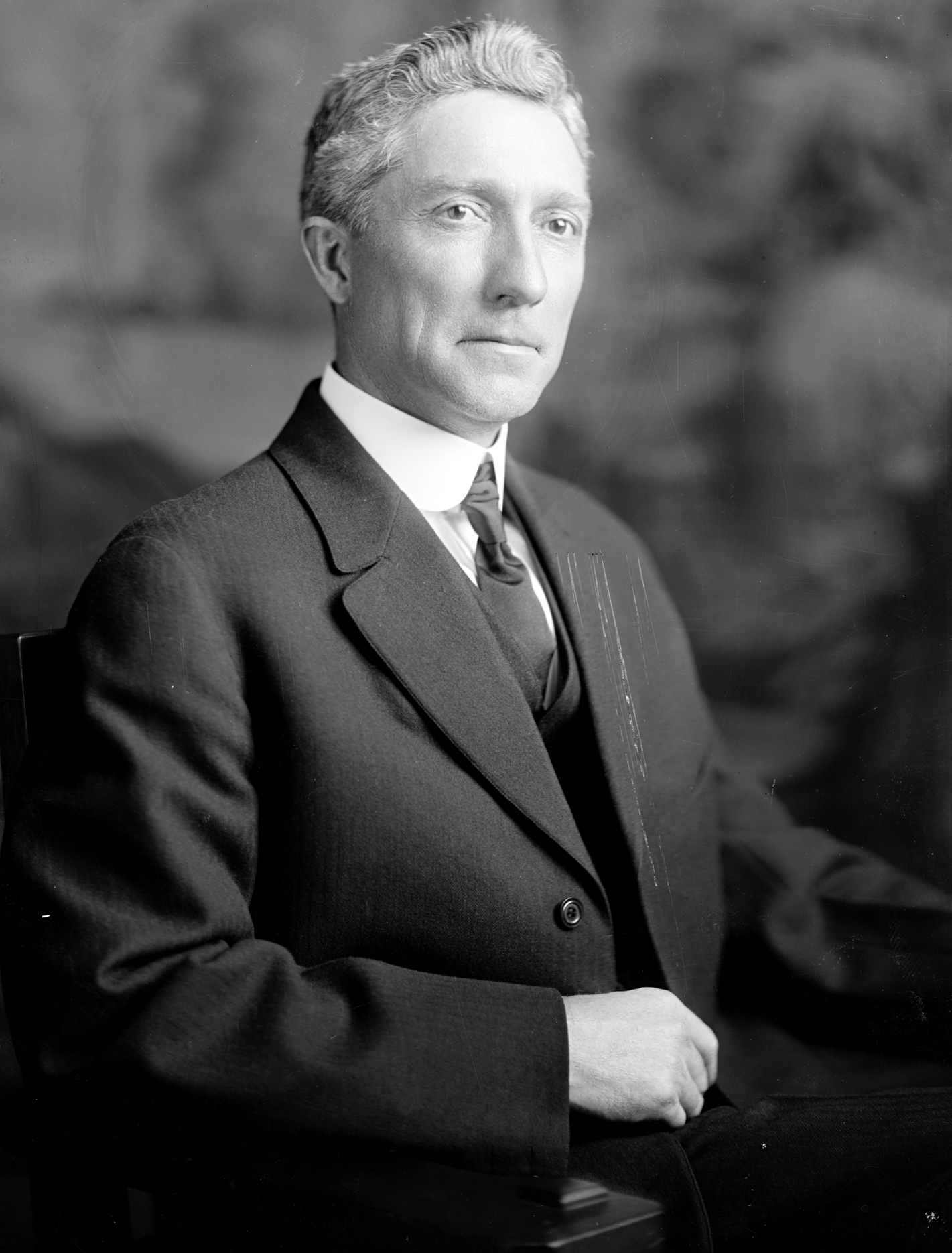

Member of the U.S. House of Representatives from Georgia's 8th district
- In office March 4, 1911 – December 8, 1916
- Preceded by: William Marcellus Howard
- Succeeded by: Tinsley W. Rucker Jr.

Personal details
- Born: November 15, 1869 near Carnesville, Georgia, U.S.
- Died: December 8, 1916 (aged 47) Washington, D.C., U.S.
- Resting place: Oconee Hill Cemetery
- Party: Democratic
- Education: University of Georgia
- Occupation: Lawyer, politician

Samuel Joelah Tribble (November 15, 1869 – December 8, 1916) was an American politician and lawyer.

Tribble was born near Carnesville, Georgia and attended the University of Georgia in Athens. He was a member of the Demosthenian Literary Society and graduated in 1891 with a Bachelor of Law (LL.B.) degree. He was admitted to the state bar that same year and began practice in Athens. From 1899 to 1904, Tribble was the solicitor of the City Court of Athens. In 1904, he became the solicitor general of the western circuit of Georgia and served in that capacity until 1908.

In 1910, Tribble ran for the United States House of Representatives as a Democrat against incumbent William Marcellus Howard and won election to the 62nd United States Congress. He won re-election to that seat for two additional terms and served from March 4, 1911, until his death while in office on December 8, 1916, in Washington, D.C. Tribble was buried in Oconee Hill Cemetery in Athens, Georgia.

== See also ==
- List of members of the United States Congress who died in office (1900–1949)

U.S. House of Representatives
Preceded by William Marcellus Howard	Member of the U.S. House of Representatives from Georgia's 8th congressional district March 4, 1911 – December 8, 1916	Succeeded by Tinsley W. Rucker, Jr.
