= Reed Amendment (alcohol) =

The Reed Amendment was sponsored by Senator James A. Reed (D) of Missouri and passed March 3, 1913, it added to the toothless Webb–Kenyon Act of 1913 by imposing a fine of $1,000 for transporting liquor into a dry state with no greater effect.
