= River and Harbors Act of 1916 =

United States federal law

In United States federal legislation the Rivers and Harbors Act of 1916 provided Federal money for the maintenance and improvements of specified rivers and harbors across the United States.

This act in particular aided the Cape Fear River in North Carolina and the Mississippi River in Arkansas. Most importantly, however, it authorized the scraping of a 21-foot-deep (6.4 m) shipping channel in the St. Clair River on the border of Michigan and Ontario, Canada, as well as including a provision to build a speed bump protruding several feet above the river bottom to slow the river's overall outflow. Since the St. Clair River formed the major northern part of the Great Lakes Waterway with Lake St. Clair and the Detroit River in the south, with its mouth forming the largest river delta in North America, the project was intended to be of great importance, both in terms of prestige and in improving overall trade with Canada. The Welland Canal between Lake Ontario and Lake Erie, which allowed shipping traffic to bypass Niagara Falls, had been under construction since 1913, and the St. Clair project was seen as complementary to better connect Lake Erie with Lake Huron. While the foundation was laid, the project itself was never completed.
