= Cotton Futures Act =

United States federal law

- Other short titles: Cotton Futures Act of 1914
- Long title: An Act to tax the privilege of dealing on exchanges, boards of trade, and similar places in contracts of sale of cotton for future delivery, and for other purposes.
- Enacted by: the 63rd United States Congress
- Effective: August 18, 1914

Citations
- Public law: Pub. L. 63–174
- Statutes at Large: 38 Stat. 693

Codification
- Titles amended: 7 U.S.C.: Agriculture
- U.S.C. sections created: 7 U.S.C. ch. 1 § 15b

Legislative history
- Introduced in the Senate as S. 110; Committee consideration by House Agriculture Committee, Senate Agriculture and Forestry Committee; Reported by the joint conference committee on July 27, 1914; agreed to by the Senate on July 27, 1914 (146-77) and by the House on July 27, 1914 (passed); Signed into law by President Woodrow Wilson on August 18, 1914

The Cotton Futures Act of 1914 (also known as the Smith-Lever law) authorized the United States Department of Agriculture to establish physical standards as a means of determining color grade, staple length and strength, and other qualities and properties for cotton. It was intended to minimize speculative manipulation of the cotton market.

The Act was rendered unconstitutional in Federal district court because it originated in the Senate. As a revenue act, it should have been drafted in the House. It was replaced by the Cotton Futures Act of 1916.
