= A. Frank Lever =

American politician (1875–1940)

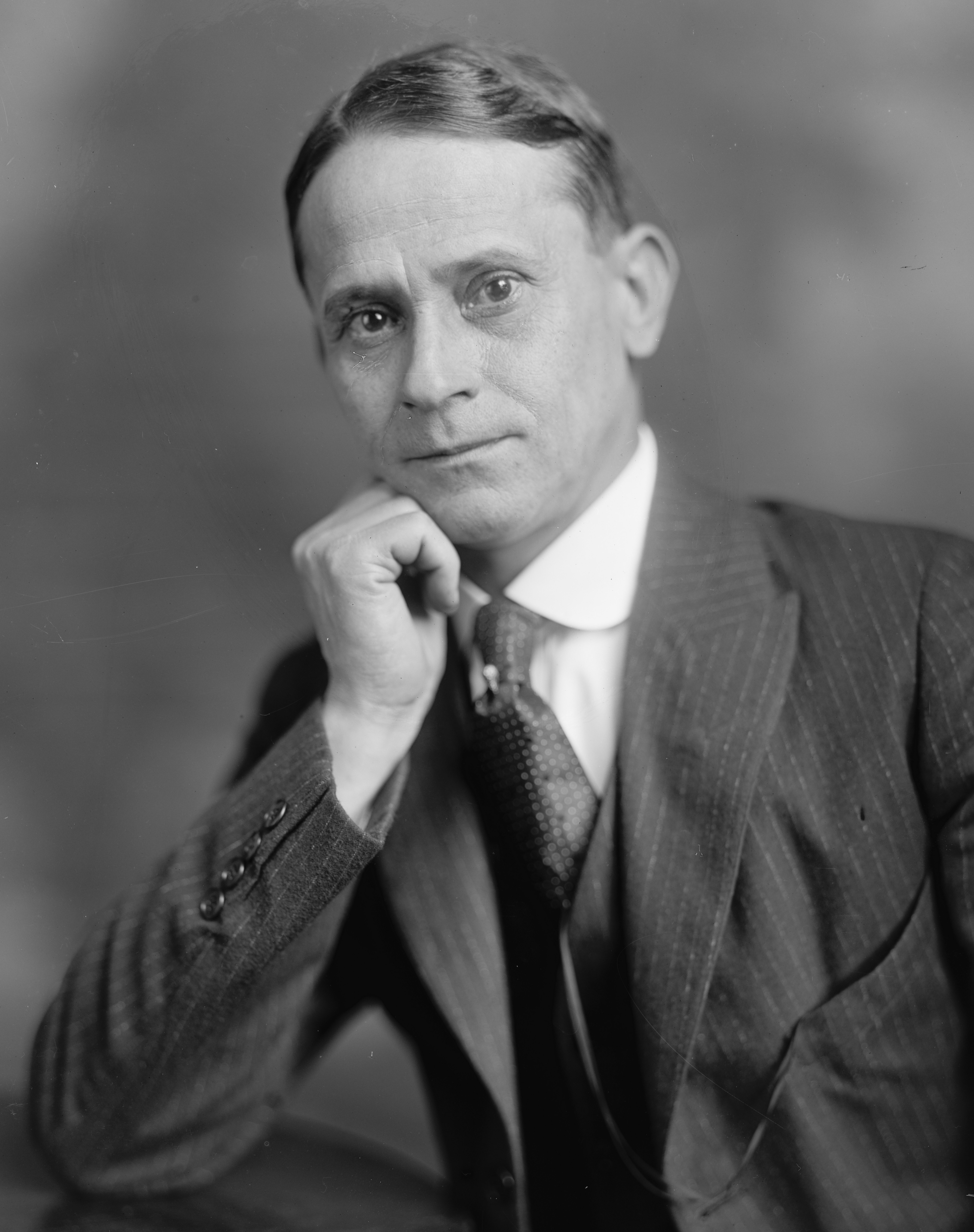
- Lever, 1905–1940

Member of the U.S. House of Representatives from South Carolina's 7th district
- In office November 5, 1901 – August 1, 1919
- Preceded by: J. William Stokes
- Succeeded by: Edward C. Mann

Chairman of the House Committee on Agriculture
- In office March 4, 1913 – March 3, 1919
- Preceded by: John Lamb
- Succeeded by: Gilbert N. Haugen

Chairman of the House Committee on Education
- In office March 4, 1911 – March 3, 1913
- Preceded by: James F. Burke
- Succeeded by: Dudley M. Hughes

Member of the South Carolina House of Representatives
- In office 1901

Personal details
- Born: Asbury Francis Lever; January 5, 1875 Lexington County, South Carolina
- Died: April 28, 1940 (aged 65) Lexington County, South Carolina
- Party: Democratic
- Spouse: Lucile Scurry Butler
- Children: Two
- Education: Newberry College; Georgetown University Law School
- Profession: Attorney

Asbury Francis "Frank" Lever (January 5, 1875 – April 28, 1940) was a member of the United States House of Representatives from South Carolina.

== Early life ==
Frank Lever was born near Springhill, Lexington County, South Carolina on January 5, 1875. He was the son of a farmer, Asbury Francis Washington Lever, and Mary Elvira Derrick. He attended the county schools and graduated from Newberry College with honors in 1895. He taught school for two years.

He moved to Washington, D.C. as the private secretary to Representative J. William Stokes from 1897 to 1901. He graduated from the Law Department of Georgetown University, Washington, D.C., in 1899 and was admitted to the bar in South Carolina the same year but did not practice.

He married Lucile Scurry Butler in 1911. They had two children.

== Political career ==
He was a delegate to the Democratic State conventions in 1896 and 1900. He was elected a member of the South Carolina House of Representatives in 1901. He was elected as a Democrat to the Fifty-seventh Congress to fill the vacancy caused by the death of J. William Stokes was reelected to the Fifty-eighth and to the eight succeeding Congresses and served from November 5, 1901, until August 1, 1919.

Lever was the chairman of the House Committee on Education from 1911 to 1913 (Sixty-second Congress) and Committee on Agriculture (Sixty-third through Sixty-fifth Congresses). His major legislative achievements were in the area of state and federal efforts in agricultural and rural life. Major bills were the Smith-Lever Act of 1914 that established the Cooperative Extension Service, the Cotton Futures Act of 1914, the Cotton Warehouse Act of 1916, the Federal Farm Loan Act of 1916 that created the Farm Credit Administration, and the Food and Fuel Control Act of 1917 that created a Food Administration and a Fuel Administration for World War I.

He resigned from Congress to become a member of the Federal Farm Loan Board, in which capacity he served until 1922. He briefly ran for the Democratic nomination for Governor of South Carolina in 1930, but sickness ended his campaign.

== Later life ==
He was a Chair of the Board of Trustees of Newberry College and Life Trustee of Clemson College from 1913 to 1940. He was elected president of the First Carolinas Joint Stock Land Bank at Columbia, South Carolina, in 1922 and was a field representative of Federal Farm Board. He was a director of the public relations administration of the Farm Credit Administration until his death.

He died on April 28, 1940, at "Seven Oaks" in Lexington County, South Carolina. He is interred at Woodland Cemetery (Cemetery Hill), on the campus of Clemson Agricultural College of South Carolina, Clemson, South Carolina.

== Legacy ==
The Cooperative Extension Service is a legacy to Lever. This helped transform rural America. The Liberty Ship SS A. Frank Lever was named after Lever. Lever Hall, a high-rise dormitory on the Clemson University campus, is named after Lever.

The Clemson University Library has Lever's papers.

U.S. House of Representatives
Preceded by J. William Stokes	Member of the U.S. House of Representatives from South Carolina's 7th congressional district 1901–1919	Succeeded by Edward C. Mann
Preceded by James F. Burke	Chairman of the House Education Committee; 1911–1913	Succeeded by Dudley M. Hughes
Preceded by John Lamb	Chairman of the House Agriculture Committee; 1913–1919	Succeeded by Gilbert N. Haugen
