= Irrigation District Act of 1916 (Smith Act) =

- Long title: An Act to promote the reclamation of arid lands.
- Nicknames: Reclamation and Irrigation Act of 1916
- Enacted by: the 64th United States Congress
- Effective: August 11, 1916

Citations
- Public law: 64-196
- Statutes at Large: 39 Stat. 506a

Codification
- Titles amended: 43 U.S.C.: Public Lands
- U.S.C. sections created: 43 U.S.C. ch. 13 § 621 et seq.

Legislative history
- Introduced in the House as H.R. 12365 by Addison T. Smith (R–ID); Signed into law by President Woodrow Wilson on August 11, 1916

The Irrigation District Act of 1916 ('Irrigation Smith Act) authorized the federal government to serve as the guarantor of debt obligations entered into by local governments to finance the acquisition, extension, or operation of irrigation, drainage, and flood control projects or to develop power generation facilities or water resources.

It was sponsored by Senator Hoke Smith, Democrat of Georgia, a former Secretary of the Interior.

States had served localities in a similar fashion and provided the model for the federal legislation. California's Irrigation District Act dated from 1887 and Colorado's from 1905.

== See also ==
- Canal
- Irrigation district
- List of canals in the United States
- Water district
