= List of former United States representatives (R) =

This is a complete list of former United States representatives whose last names begin with the letter R.

== Number of years and terms the member has served ==
The number of years the representative/delegate has served in Congress indicates the number of terms the representative/delegate has. Note the representative/delegate can also serve non-consecutive terms if the representative/delegate loses election and wins re-election to the House.

- 2 years – 1 or 2 terms
- 4 years – 2 or 3 terms
- 6 years – 3 or 4 terms
- 8 years – 4 or 5 terms
- 10 years – 5 or 6 terms
- 12 years – 6 or 7 terms
- 14 years – 7 or 8 terms
- 16 years – 8 or 9 terms
- 18 years – 9 or 10 terms
- 20 years – 10 or 11 terms
- 22 years – 11 or 12 terms
- 24 years – 12 or 13 terms
- 26 years – 13 or 14 terms
- 28 years – 14 or 15 terms
- 30 years – 15 or 16 terms
- 32 years – 16 or 17 terms
- 34 years – 17 or 18 terms
- 36 years – 18 or 19 terms
- 38 years – 19 or 20 terms
- 40 years – 20 or 21 terms
- 42 years – 21 or 22 terms
- 44 years – 22 or 23 terms
- 46 years – 23 or 24 terms
- 48 years – 24 or 25 terms
- 50 years – 25 or 26 terms
- 52 years – 26 or 27 terms
- 54 years – 27 or 28 terms
- 56 years – 28 or 29 terms
- 58 years – 29 or 30 terms

Name	Term	State/ Territory	Party	Lifespan
Louis C. Rabaut	1935–1947; 1949–1961	Michigan	Democratic	1886–1961
Benjamin J. Rabin	1945–1947	New York	Democratic	1896–1969
John Abner Race	1965–1967	Wisconsin	Democratic	1914–1983
George Radanovich	1995–2011	California	Republican	1955–present
Amos H. Radcliffe	1919–1923	New Jersey	Republican	1870–1950
Trey Radel	2013–2014	Florida	Republican	1976–present
William Radford	1863–1867	New York	Democratic	1814–1870
Edmund P. Radwan	1951–1959	New York	Republican	1911–1959
Heartsill Ragon	1923–1933	Arkansas	Democratic	1885–1940
J. Willard Ragsdale	1913–1919	South Carolina	Democratic	1872–1919
Nick Rahall	1977–2015	West Virginia	Democratic	1949–present
Tom Railsback	1967–1983	Illinois	Republican	1932–2020
John Raines	1889–1893	New York	Republican	1840–1909
Henry Thomas Rainey	1903–1921; 1923–1934	Illinois	Democratic	1860–1934
John W. Rainey	1918–1923	Illinois	Democratic	1880–1923
Joseph H. Rainey	1870–1879	South Carolina	Republican	1832–1887
Lilius Bratton Rainey	1919–1923	Alabama	Democratic	1876–1959
Albert Rains	1945–1965	Alabama	Democratic	1902–1991
John E. Raker	1911–1926	California	Democratic	1863–1926
Frank M. Ramey	1929–1931	Illinois	Republican	1881–1942
Homer A. Ramey	1943–1949	Ohio	Republican	1891–1960
Robert L. Ramsay	1933–1939; 1941–1943; 1949–1953	West Virginia	Democratic	1877–1956
Alexander Ramsey	1843–1847	Pennsylvania	Whig	1815–1903
John R. Ramsey	1917–1921	New Jersey	Republican	1862–1933
Robert Ramsey	1833–1835	Pennsylvania	Democratic	1780–1849
Robert Ramsey	1841–1843	Pennsylvania	Whig	1780–1849
William Ramsey	1827–1831	Pennsylvania	Democratic	1779–1831
William Sterrett Ramsey	1839–1840	Pennsylvania	Democratic	1810–1840
C. William Ramseyer	1915–1933	Iowa	Republican	1875–1943
Robert Ramspeck	1929–1945	Georgia	Democratic	1890–1972
Jim Ramstad	1991–2009	Minnesota	Republican	1946–2020
Alexander Randall	1841–1843	Maryland	Whig	1803–1881
Benjamin Randall	1839–1843	Maine	Whig	1789–1859
Charles Hiram Randall	1915–1921	California	Prohibitionist	1865–1951
Charles S. Randall	1889–1895	Massachusetts	Republican	1824–1904
Clifford E. Randall	1919–1921	Wisconsin	Republican	1876–1934
Samuel J. Randall	1863–1890	Pennsylvania	Democratic	1828–1890
William H. Randall	1863–1867	Kentucky	Unconditional Unionist	1812–1881
William J. Randall	1959–1977	Missouri	Democratic	1909–2000
Choice B. Randell	1901–1913	Texas	Democratic	1857–1945
James F. Randolph	1828–1833	New Jersey	National Republican	1791–1872
James Henry Randolph	1877–1879	Tennessee	Republican	1825–1900
Jennings Randolph	1933–1947	West Virginia	Democratic	1902–1998
John Randolph of Roanoke	1799–1813; 1815–1817; 1819–1825	Virginia	Democratic-Republican	1773–1833
John Randolph of Roanoke	1825; 1827–1829; 1833	Virginia	Democratic	1773–1833
Joseph Fitz Randolph	1837–1843	New Jersey	Whig	1803–1873
Thomas Mann Randolph Jr.	1803–1807	Virginia	Democratic-Republican	1768–1828
John Henry Raney	1895–1897	Missouri	Republican	1849–1928
Charles Rangel	1971–2017	New York	Democratic	1930–2025
Christopher Rankin	1819–1825	Mississippi	Democratic-Republican	1788–1826
Christopher Rankin	1825–1826	Mississippi	Democratic	1788–1826
Jeannette Rankin	1917–1919; 1941–1943	Montana	Republican	1880–1973
John E. Rankin	1921–1953	Mississippi	Democratic	1882–1960
Joseph Rankin	1883–1886	Wisconsin	Democratic	1833–1886
Ambrose Ranney	1881–1887	Massachusetts	Republican	1821–1899
Joseph E. Ransdell	1899–1913	Louisiana	Democratic	1858–1954
Alonzo J. Ransier	1873–1875	South Carolina	Republican	1834–1882
Harry C. Ransley	1920–1937	Pennsylvania	Republican	1863–1941
Robert Rantoul Jr.	1851–1852	Massachusetts	Democratic	1805–1852
James T. Rapier	1873–1875	Alabama	Republican	1837–1883
John Rarick	1967–1975	Louisiana	Democratic	1924–2009
James Rariden	1837–1841	Indiana	Whig	1795–1856
William R. Ratchford	1979–1985	Connecticut	Democratic	1934–2011
John Ratcliffe	2015–2020	Texas	Republican	1965–present
Henry Riggs Rathbone	1923–1928	Illinois	Republican	1870–1928
George O. Rathbun	1843–1847	New York	Democratic	1802–1870
George W. Rauch	1907–1917	Indiana	Democratic	1876–1940
Green Berry Raum	1867–1869	Illinois	Republican	1829–1909
Arthur Ravenel Jr.	1987–1995	South Carolina	Republican	1927–2023
Joseph Lafayette Rawlins	1893–1895	Utah	Democratic	1850–1926
Morgan Rawls	1873–1874	Georgia	Democratic	1829–1906
George W. Ray	1883–1885; 1891–1902	New York	Republican	1844–1925
John H. Ray	1953–1963	New York	Republican	1886–1975
Joseph Warren Ray	1889–1891	Pennsylvania	Republican	1849–1928
Ossian Ray	1881–1885	New Hampshire	Republican	1835–1892
Richard Ray	1983–1993	Georgia	Democratic	1927–1999
William H. Ray	1873–1875	Illinois	Republican	1812–1881
Sam Rayburn	1913–1961	Texas	Democratic	1882–1961
Leo F. Rayfiel	1945–1947	New York	Democratic	1888–1978
Henry Jarvis Raymond	1865–1867	New York	Republican	1820–1869
John B. Raymond	1883–1885	Dakota	Republican	1844–1886
Isidor Rayner	1887–1889; 1891–1895	Maryland	Democratic	1850–1912
Kenneth Rayner	1839–1845	North Carolina	Whig	1808–1884
David Rea	1875–1879	Missouri	Democratic	1831–1901
John Rea	1803–1811; 1813–1815	Pennsylvania	Democratic-Republican	1755–1829
Almon H. Read	1842–1844	Pennsylvania	Democratic	1790–1844
Nathan Read	1800–1803	Massachusetts	Federalist	1759–1849
William B. Read	1871–1875	Kentucky	Democratic	1817–1880
Edwin Godwin Reade	1855–1857	North Carolina	American	1812–1894
John R. Reading	1869–1870	Pennsylvania	Democratic	1826–1886
Charles Ready	1853–1855	Tennessee	Whig	1802-1878
Charles Ready	1855–1859	Tennessee	American	1802-1878
John Henninger Reagan	1857–1861; 1875–1887	Texas	Democratic	1818–1905
Frazier Reams	1951–1955	Ohio	Independent	1897–1971
C. Frank Reavis	1915–1922	Nebraska	Republican	1870–1932
John Reber	1919–1923	Pennsylvania	Republican	1858–1931
Monroe Minor Redden	1947–1953	North Carolina	Democratic	1901–1987
William C. Redfield	1911–1913	New York	Democratic	1858–1932
John Randall Reding	1841–1845	New Hampshire	Democratic	1805–1892
Rolland W. Redlin	1965–1967	North Dakota	Democratic	1920–2011
Bill Redmond	1997–1999	New Mexico	Republican	1955–present
B. Carroll Reece	1921–1931; 1933–1947; 1951–1961	Tennessee	Republican	1889–1961
Louise Goff Reece	1961–1963	Tennessee	Republican	1898–1970
Charles Manning Reed	1843–1845	Pennsylvania	Whig	1803–1871
Chauncey W. Reed	1935–1956	Illinois	Republican	1890–1956
Daniel A. Reed	1919–1959	New York	Republican	1875–1959
Edward C. Reed	1831–1833	New York	Democratic	1793–1883
Eugene Elliott Reed	1913–1915	New Hampshire	Democratic	1866–1940
Isaac Reed	1852–1853	Maine	Whig	1809–1887
Jack Reed	1991–1997	Rhode Island	Democratic	1949–present
James B. Reed	1923–1929	Arkansas	Democratic	1881–1935
John Reed Jr.	1813–1817; 1821–1825	Massachusetts	Federalist	1781–1860
John Reed Jr.	1825–1835	Massachusetts	National Republican	1781–1860
John Reed Jr.	1835–1837	Massachusetts	Anti-Masonic	1781–1860
John Reed Jr.	1837–1841	Massachusetts	Whig	1781–1860
John Reed Sr.	1795–1801	Massachusetts	Federalist	1751–1831
Joseph Rea Reed	1889–1891	Iowa	Republican	1835–1925
Philip Reed	1817–1819; 1822–1823	Maryland	Democratic-Republican	1760–1829
Robert Rentoul Reed	1849–1851	Pennsylvania	Whig	1807–1864
Stuart F. Reed	1917–1925	West Virginia	Republican	1866–1935
Thomas Brackett Reed	1877–1899	Maine	Republican	1839–1902
Tom Reed	2010–2022	New York	Republican	1971–present
William Reed	1811–1815	Massachusetts	Federalist	1776–1837
William Augustus Reeder	1899–1911	Kansas	Republican	1849–1929
Edward Herbert Rees	1937–1961	Kansas	Republican	1886–1969
Rollin R. Rees	1911–1913	Kansas	Republican	1865–1935
Thomas M. Rees	1965–1977	California	Democratic	1925–2003
David Addison Reese	1853–1855	Georgia	Whig	1794–1871
Seaborn Reese	1882–1887	Georgia	Democratic	1846–1907
Albert L. Reeves Jr.	1947–1949	Missouri	Republican	1906–1987
Henry Augustus Reeves	1869–1871	New York	Democratic	1832–1916
Walter Reeves	1895–1903	Illinois	Republican	1848–1909
Kenneth M. Regan	1947–1955	Texas	Democratic	1891–1959
Ralph Regula	1973–2009	Ohio	Republican	1924–2017
Denny Rehberg	2001–2013	Montana	Republican	1955–present
Dave Reichert	2005–2019	Washington	Republican	1950–present
Charles C. Reid	1901–1911	Arkansas	Democratic	1868–1922
Charlotte Thompson Reid	1963–1971	Illinois	Republican	1913–2007
David Settle Reid	1843–1847	North Carolina	Democratic	1813–1891
Frank R. Reid	1923–1935	Illinois	Republican	1879–1945
Harry Reid	1983–1987	Nevada	Democratic	1939–2021
James W. Reid	1885–1886	North Carolina	Democratic	1849–1902
John William Reid	1861	Missouri	Democratic	1821–1881
Ogden Reid	1963–1972	New York	Republican	1925–2019
Ogden Reid	1972–1975	New York	Democratic	1925–2019
Robert R. Reid	1819–1823	Georgia	Democratic-Republican	1789–1841
Ben Reifel	1961–1971	South Dakota	Republican	1906–1990
James B. Reilly	1875–1879; 1889–1895	Pennsylvania	Democratic	1845–1924
John Reilly	1875–1877	Pennsylvania	Democratic	1836–1904
Michael Reilly	1913–1917; 1930–1939	Wisconsin	Democratic	1869–1944
Thomas L. Reilly	1911–1915	Connecticut	Democratic	1858–1924
Wilson Reilly	1857–1859	Pennsylvania	Democratic	1811–1885
Luther Reily	1837–1839	Pennsylvania	Democratic	1794–1854
Edwin Reinecke	1965–1969	California	Republican	1924–2016
James Hugh Relfe	1843–1847	Missouri	Democratic	1791–1863
Frederick Remann	1895	Illinois	Republican	1847–1895
Jim Renacci	2011–2019	Ohio	Republican	1958–present
Abraham Rencher	1829–1833	North Carolina	Democratic	1798–1883
Abraham Rencher	1833–1837	North Carolina	National Republican	1798–1883
Abraham Rencher	1837–1839; 1841–1843	North Carolina	Whig	1798–1883
Rick Renzi	2003–2009	Arizona	Republican	1958–present
Alexander J. Resa	1945–1947	Illinois	Democratic	1887–1964
Joseph Y. Resnick	1965–1969	New York	Democratic	1924–1969
Henry S. Reuss	1955–1983	Wisconsin	Democratic	1912–2002
John E. Reyburn	1890–1897; 1906–1907	Pennsylvania	Republican	1845–1914
William S. Reyburn	1911–1913	Pennsylvania	Republican	1882–1946
Silvestre Reyes	1997–2013	Texas	Democratic	1944–present
Edwin R. Reynolds	1860–1861	New York	Republican	1816–1908
Gideon Reynolds	1847–1851	New York	Whig	1813–1896
James B. Reynolds	1815–1817; 1823–1825	Tennessee	Democratic-Republican	1779–1851
John Reynolds	1834–1837; 1839–1843	Illinois	Democratic	1788–1865
John Hazard Reynolds	1859–1861	New York	Anti-Lecompton Democratic	1819–1875
John Merriman Reynolds	1905–1911	Pennsylvania	Republican	1848–1933
Joseph Reynolds	1835–1837	New York	Democratic	1785–1864
Mel Reynolds	1993–1995	Illinois	Democratic	1952–present
Thomas M. Reynolds	1999–2009	New York	Republican	1950–present
John Rhea	1803–1815; 1817–1823	Tennessee	Democratic-Republican	1753–1832
John S. Rhea	1897–1902; 1903–1905	Kentucky	Democratic	1855–1924
William F. Rhea	1899–1903	Virginia	Democratic	1858–1931
Robert Rhett	1837–1849	South Carolina	Democratic	1800–1876
Joseph L. Rhinock	1905–1911	Kentucky	Democratic	1863–1926
George M. Rhodes	1949–1969	Pennsylvania	Democratic	1898–1978
John Jacob Rhodes	1953–1983	Arizona	Republican	1916–2003
Jay Rhodes	1987–1993	Arizona	Republican	1943–2011
Marion E. Rhodes	1905–1907; 1919–1923	Missouri	Republican	1868–1928
Reid Ribble	2011–2017	Wisconsin	Republican	1956–present
Abraham Ribicoff	1949–1953	Connecticut	Democratic	1910–1998
James B. Ricaud	1855–1859	Maryland	American	1808–1866
Alexander H. Rice	1859–1867	Massachusetts	Republican	1818–1895
Americus V. Rice	1875–1879	Ohio	Democratic	1835–1904
Edmund Rice	1887–1889	Minnesota	Democratic	1819–1889
Edward Y. Rice	1871–1873	Illinois	Democratic	1820–1883
Henry M. Rice	1853–1857	Minnesota	Republican	1816–1894
John B. Rice	1881–1883	Ohio	Republican	1832–1893
John Blake Rice	1873–1874	Illinois	Republican	1809–1874
John H. Rice	1861–1867	Maine	Republican	1816–1911
John McConnell Rice	1869–1873	Kentucky	Democratic	1831–1895
Kathleen Rice	2015–2023	New York	Democratic	1965–present
Theron Moses Rice	1881–1883	Missouri	Greenbacker	1829–1895
Thomas Rice	1815–1819	Massachusetts	Federalist	1768–1854
Tom Rice	2013–2023	South Carolina	Republican	1957–present
William W. Rice	1877–1887	Massachusetts	Republican	1826–1896
Carl West Rich	1963–1965	Ohio	Republican	1898–1972
Charles Rich	1813–1815; 1817–1824	Vermont	Democratic-Republican	1771–1824
John T. Rich	1881–1883	Michigan	Republican	1841–1926
Robert F. Rich	1930–1943; 1945–1951	Pennsylvania	Republican	1883–1968
Gabriel Richard	1823–1825	Michigan	None	1767–1832
Charles L. Richards	1923–1925	Nevada	Democratic	1877–1953
Jacob Richards	1803–1809	Pennsylvania	Democratic-Republican	1773–1816
James A. D. Richards	1893–1895	Ohio	Democratic	1845–1911
James P. Richards	1933–1957	South Carolina	Democratic	1894–1979
John Richards	1795–1797	Pennsylvania	Democratic-Republican	1753–1822
John Richards	1823–1825	New York	Democratic-Republican	1765–1850
Mark Richards	1817–1821	Vermont	Democratic-Republican	1760–1844
Matthias Richards	1807–1811	Pennsylvania	Democratic-Republican	1758–1830
Bill Richardson	1983–1997	New Mexico	Democratic	1947–2023
David P. Richardson	1879–1883	New York	Republican	1833–1904
George F. Richardson	1893–1895	Michigan	Democratic	1850–1923
James D. Richardson	1885–1905	Tennessee	Democratic	1843–1914
James M. Richardson	1905–1907	Kentucky	Democratic	1858–1925
John Peter Richardson II	1836–1839	South Carolina	Democratic	1801–1864
John S. Richardson	1879–1883	South Carolina	Democratic	1828–1894
Joseph Richardson	1827–1831	Massachusetts	National Republican	1778–1871
Laura Richardson	2007–2013	California	Democratic	1962–present
William Alexander Richardson	1847–1856; 1861–1863	Illinois	Democratic	1811–1875
William Emanuel Richardson	1933–1937	Pennsylvania	Democratic	1886–1948
William M. Richardson	1811–1814	Massachusetts	Democratic-Republican	1774–1838
William Richardson	1900–1914	Alabama	Democratic	1839–1914
Cedric Richmond	2011–2021	Louisiana	Democratic	1973–present
Fred Richmond	1975–1982	New York	Democratic	1923–2019
Hiram Lawton Richmond	1873–1875	Pennsylvania	Republican	1810–1885
James Richmond	1879–1881	Virginia	Democratic	1842–1910
Jonathan Richmond	1819–1821	New York	Democratic-Republican	1774–1853
Edwin D. Ricketts	1915–1917; 1919–1923	Ohio	Republican	1867–1937
Carl W. Riddick	1919–1923	Montana	Republican	1872–1960
Albert G. Riddle	1861–1863	Ohio	Republican	1816–1902
George R. Riddle	1851–1855	Delaware	Democratic	1817–1867
Haywood Yancey Riddle	1875–1879	Tennessee	Democratic	1834–1879
Ira E. Rider	1903–1905	New York	Democratic	1868–1906
Tom Ridge	1983–1995	Pennsylvania	Republican	1945–present
Edwin R. Ridgely	1897–1901	Kansas	Populist	1844–1927
Henry M. Ridgely	1811–1815	Delaware	Federalist	1779–1847
Joseph Ridgway	1837–1843	Ohio	Whig	1783–1861
Robert Ridgway	1870	Virginia	Conservative	1823–1870
Donald Riegle	1967–1973	Michigan	Republican	1938–2026
Donald Riegle	1973–1976	Michigan	Democratic	1938–2026
R. Walter Riehlman	1947–1965	New York	Republican	1899–1978
John Winebrenner Rife	1889–1893	Pennsylvania	Republican	1846–1908
Scott Rigell	2011–2017	Virginia	Republican	1960–present
Denver Riggleman	2019–2021	Virginia	Republican	1970–present
Frank Riggs	1991–1993; 1995–1999	California	Republican	1950–2023
James M. Riggs	1883–1887	Illinois	Democratic	1839–1933
Jetur R. Riggs	1859–1861	New Jersey	Anti-Lecompton Democratic	1809–1869
Lewis Riggs	1841–1843	New York	Democratic	1789–1870
Hugh M. Rigney	1937–1939	Illinois	Democratic	1873–1950
Samuel Riker	1804–1805; 1807–1809	New York	Democratic-Republican	1743–1823
Bob Riley	1997–2003	Alabama	Republican	1944–present
Corinne Boyd Riley	1962–1963	South Carolina	Democratic	1893–1979
John J. Riley	1945–1949; 1951–1962	South Carolina	Democratic	1895–1962
John I. Rinaker	1896–1897	Illinois	Republican	1830–1915
Matthew John Rinaldo	1973–1993	New Jersey	Republican	1931–2008
Samuel Ringgold	1810–1815; 1817–1821	Maryland	Democratic-Republican	1770–1829
Daniel J. Riordan	1899–1901; 1906–1923	New York	Democratic	1870–1923
Eleazar Wheelock Ripley	1835–1839	Louisiana	Democratic	1782–1839
James W. Ripley	1826–1830	Maine	Democratic	1786–1835
Thomas C. Ripley	1846–1847	New York	Whig	1807–1897
Ted Risenhoover	1975–1979	Oklahoma	Democratic	1934–2006
Charles Risk	1935–1937; 1939–1941	Rhode Island	Republican	1897–1943
Elijah Risley	1849–1851	New York	Whig	1787–1870
Thomas Ritchey	1847–1849; 1853–1855	Ohio	Democratic	1801–1863
Byron F. Ritchie	1893–1895	Ohio	Democratic	1853–1928
David Ritchie	1853–1855	Pennsylvania	Whig	1812–1867
David Ritchie	1855–1857	Pennsylvania	Oppositionist	1812–1867
David Ritchie	1857–1859	Pennsylvania	Republican	1812–1867
James M. Ritchie	1881–1883	Ohio	Republican	1829–1918
John Ritchie	1871–1873	Maryland	Democratic	1831–1887
Burwell C. Ritter	1865–1867	Kentucky	Democratic	1810–1880
Donald L. Ritter	1979–1993	Pennsylvania	Republican	1940–present
John Ritter	1843–1847	Pennsylvania	Democratic	1779–1851
David Rivera	2011–2013	Florida	Republican	1965–present
L. Mendel Rivers	1941–1970	South Carolina	Democratic	1905–1970
Lynn Rivers	1995–2003	Michigan	Democratic	1956–present
Ralph Julian Rivers	1959–1966	Alaska	Democratic	1903–1976
Thomas Rivers	1855–1857	Tennessee	American	1819–1863
Francis E. Rives	1837–1841	Virginia	Democratic	1792–1861
William Cabell Rives	1823–1825	Virginia	Democratic-Republican	1793–1868
William Cabell Rives	1825–1829	Virginia	Democratic	1793–1868
Zeno J. Rives	1905–1907	Illinois	Republican	1874–1939
John Franklin Rixey	1897–1907	Virginia	Democratic	1854–1907
Ross Rizley	1941–1949	Oklahoma	Republican	1892–1969
Sidney C. Roach	1921–1925	Missouri	Republican	1876–1934
John Roane	1809–1815	Virginia	Democratic-Republican	1766–1838
John Roane	1827–1831; 1835–1837	Virginia	Democratic	1766–1838
John J. Roane	1831–1833	Virginia	Democratic	1794–1869
William H. Roane	1815–1817	Virginia	Democratic-Republican	1787–1845
Charles W. Roark	1929	Kentucky	Republican	1887–1929
Edward Robb	1897–1905	Missouri	Democratic	1857–1934
Edward Everett Robbins	1897–1899; 1917–1919	Pennsylvania	Republican	1860–1919
Gaston A. Robbins	1893–1896; 1899–1900	Alabama	Democratic	1858–1902
George R. Robbins	1855–1857	New Jersey	Oppositionist	1808–1875
George R. Robbins	1857–1859	New Jersey	Republican	1808–1875
John Robbins	1849–1855; 1875–1877	Pennsylvania	Democratic	1808–1880
William M. Robbins	1873–1879	North Carolina	Democratic	1828–1905
Anthony Ellmaker Roberts	1855–1857	Pennsylvania	Oppositionist	1803–1885
Anthony Ellmaker Roberts	1857–1859	Pennsylvania	Republican	1803–1885
Charles Boyle Roberts	1875–1879	Maryland	Democratic	1842–1899
Clint Roberts	1981–1983	South Dakota	Republican	1935–2017
Edwin E. Roberts	1911–1919	Nevada	Republican	1870–1933
Ellis H. Roberts	1871–1875	New York	Republican	1827–1918
Ernest W. Roberts	1899–1917	Massachusetts	Republican	1858–1924
Jonathan Roberts	1811–1814	Pennsylvania	Democratic-Republican	1771–1854
Kenneth A. Roberts	1951–1965	Alabama	Democratic	1912–1989
Pat Roberts	1981–1997	Kansas	Republican	1936–present
Ray Roberts	1962–1981	Texas	Democratic	1913–1992
Robert W. Roberts	1843–1847	Mississippi	Democratic	1784–1865
William R. Roberts	1871–1875	New York	Democratic	1830–1897
A. Willis Robertson	1933–1946	Virginia	Democratic	1887–1971
Alice Mary Robertson	1921–1923	Oklahoma	Republican	1854–1931
Charles R. Robertson	1941–1943; 1945–1949	North Dakota	Republican	1889–1951
Edward White Robertson	1877–1883; 1887	Louisiana	Democratic	1823–1887
George Robertson	1817–1821	Kentucky	Democratic-Republican	1790–1874
John Robertson	1834–1837	Virginia	National Republican	1787–1873
John Robertson	1837–1839	Virginia	Whig	1787–1873
Samuel Matthews Robertson	1887–1907	Louisiana	Democratic	1852–1911
Thomas A. Robertson	1883–1887	Kentucky	Democratic	1848–1892
Thomas B. Robertson	1812–1818	Louisiana	Democratic-Republican	1779–1828
William H. Robertson	1867–1869	New York	Republican	1823–1898
Edward J. Robeson Jr.	1950–1959	Virginia	Democratic	1890–1966
George M. Robeson	1879–1883	New Jersey	Republican	1829–1897
Reuben Robie	1851–1853	New York	Democratic	1799–1872
Christopher Robinson	1859–1861	Rhode Island	Republican	1806–1889
Edward Robinson	1838–1839	Maine	Whig	1796–1857
George D. Robinson	1877–1884	Massachusetts	Republican	1834–1896
J. Kenneth Robinson	1971–1985	Virginia	Republican	1916–1990
J. W. Robinson	1933–1947	Utah	Democratic	1878–1964
James C. Robinson	1859–1865; 1871–1875	Illinois	Democratic	1823–1886
James M. Robinson	1897–1905	Indiana	Democratic	1861–1942
James S. Robinson	1881–1885	Ohio	Republican	1827–1892
James Wallace Robinson	1873–1875	Ohio	Republican	1826–1898
John Buchanan Robinson	1891–1897	Pennsylvania	Republican	1846–1933
John L. Robinson	1847–1853	Indiana	Democratic	1813–1860
John Seaton Robinson	1899–1903	Nebraska	Democratic	1856–1903
Joseph T. Robinson	1903–1913	Arkansas	Democratic	1872–1937
Leonidas D. Robinson	1917–1921	North Carolina	Democratic	1867–1941
Milton S. Robinson	1875–1879	Indiana	Republican	1832–1892
Orville Robinson	1843–1845	New York	Democratic	1801–1882
Thomas J. B. Robinson	1923–1933	Iowa	Republican	1868–1958
Thomas Robinson Jr.	1839–1841	Delaware	Democratic	1800–1843
Tommy F. Robinson	1985–1989; 1989–1991	Arkansas	Democratic; Republican	1942–2024
William Erigena Robinson	1867–1869; 1881–1885	New York	Democratic	1814–1892
David Fullerton Robison	1855–1857	Pennsylvania	Oppositionist	1816–1859
Howard W. Robison	1958–1975	New York	Republican	1915–1987
John M. Robsion	1919–1930; 1935–1948	Kentucky	Republican	1873–1948
John M. Robsion Jr.	1953–1959	Kentucky	Republican	1904–1990
Martha Roby	2011–2021	Alabama	Republican	1976–present
William B. Rochester	1821–1823	New York	Democratic-Republican	1789–1838
Lewis K. Rockefeller	1937–1943	New York	Republican	1875–1948
William R. Rockhill	1847–1849	Indiana	Democratic	1793–1865
Francis W. Rockwell	1884–1891	Massachusetts	Republican	1844–1929
Hosea H. Rockwell	1891–1893	New York	Democratic	1840–1918
John A. Rockwell	1845–1849	Connecticut	Whig	1803–1861
Julius Rockwell	1843–1851	Massachusetts	Whig	1805–1888
Robert F. Rockwell	1941–1949	Colorado	Republican	1886–1950
Seaborn Roddenbery	1910–1913	Georgia	Democratic	1870–1913
William A. Rodenberg	1899–1901; 1903–1913; 1915–1923	Illinois	Republican	1865–1937
Bernard S. Rodey	1901–1905	New Mexico	Republican	1856–1927
Robert L. Rodgers	1939–1947	Pennsylvania	Republican	1875–1960
Peter W. Rodino	1949–1989	New Jersey	Democratic	1909–2005
William Rodman	1811–1813	Pennsylvania	Democratic-Republican	1757–1824
Caesar Augustus Rodney	1803–1805; 1821–1822	Delaware	Democratic-Republican	1772–1824
Daniel Rodney	1822–1823	Delaware	Federalist	1764–1846
George B. Rodney	1841–1845	Delaware	Whig	1803–1883
Ciro Rodriguez	1997–2005; 2007–2011	Texas	Democratic	1946–present
Dudley Roe	1945–1947	Maryland	Democratic	1881–1970
James A. Roe	1945–1947	New York	Democratic	1896–1967
Phil Roe	2009–2021	Tennessee	Republican	1945–present
Robert A. Roe	1969–1993	New Jersey	Democratic	1924–2014
Buddy Roemer	1981–1988	Louisiana	Democratic	1943–2021
Tim Roemer	1991–2003	Indiana	Democratic	1956–present
James E. Rogan	1997–2001	California	Republican	1957–present
Andrew J. Rogers	1863–1867	New Jersey	Democratic	1828–1900
Anthony A. C. Rogers	1869–1871	Arkansas	Democratic	1821–1899
Byron G. Rogers	1951–1971	Colorado	Democratic	1900–1983
Charles Rogers	1843–1845	New York	Whig	1800–1874
Dwight L. Rogers	1945–1954	Florida	Democratic	1886–1954
Edith Nourse Rogers	1925–1960	Massachusetts	Republican	1881–1960
Edward Rogers	1839–1841	New York	Democratic	1787–1857
George F. Rogers	1945–1947	New York	Democratic	1887–1948
James Rogers	1835–1837; 1839–1843	South Carolina	Democratic	1795–1873
John Rogers	1871–1873	New York	Democratic	1813–1879
John Henry Rogers	1883–1891	Arkansas	Democratic	1845–1911
John Jacob Rogers	1913–1925	Massachusetts	Republican	1881–1925
Mike Rogers	2001–2015	Michigan	Republican	1963–present
Paul Rogers	1955–1979	Florida	Democratic	1921–2008
Sion Hart Rogers	1853–1855	North Carolina	Whig	1825–1874
Sion Hart Rogers	1871–1873	North Carolina	Democratic	1825–1874
Thomas Jones Rogers	1818–1824	Pennsylvania	Democratic-Republican	1781–1832
Walter E. Rogers	1951–1967	Texas	Democratic	1908–2001
Will Rogers	1933–1943	Oklahoma	Democratic	1898–1983
Will Rogers Jr.	1943–1944	California	Democratic	1911–1993
William Findlay Rogers	1883–1885	New York	Democratic	1820–1899
William Nathaniel Rogers	1923–1925; 1932–1937	New Hampshire	Democratic	1892–1945
Dana Rohrabacher	1989–2019	California	Republican	1947–present
Edward G. Rohrbough	1943–1945; 1947–1949	West Virginia	Republican	1874–1956
Todd Rokita	2011–2019	Indiana	Republican	1970–present
Edward H. Rollins	1861–1867	New Hampshire	Republican	1824–1889
James S. Rollins	1861–1863	Missouri	Constitutional Unionist	1812–1888
James S. Rollins	1863–1865	Missouri	Unionist	1812–1888
Thomas Rolph	1941–1945	California	Republican	1885–1956
James Dixon Roman	1847–1849	Maryland	Whig	1809–1867
Jacob Romeis	1885–1889	Ohio	Republican	1835–1904
Trinidad Romero	1877–1879	New Mexico	Republican	1835–1918
Carlos Romero Barceló	1993–2001	Puerto Rico	Democratic	1932–2021
Milton A. Romjue	1917–1921; 1923–1943	Missouri	Democratic	1874–1968
Carlos P. Romulo	1944–1946	Philippines	None	1899–1985
Daniel J. Ronan	1965–1969	Illinois	Democratic	1914–1969
Teno Roncalio	1965–1967; 1971–1978	Wyoming	Democratic	1916–2003
Angelo D. Roncallo	1973–1975	New York	Republican	1927–2010
Francis Rooney	2017–2021	Florida	Republican	1953–present
Fred B. Rooney	1963–1979	Pennsylvania	Democratic	1925–2019
John J. Rooney	1944–1974	New York	Democratic	1903–1975
Tom Rooney	2009–2019	Florida	Republican	1970–present
Franklin D. Roosevelt Jr.	1949–1951	New York	Liberal	1914–1988
Franklin D. Roosevelt Jr.	1951–1955	New York	Democratic	1914–1988
James Roosevelt	1955–1965	California	Democratic	1907–1991
James I. Roosevelt	1841–1843	New York	Democratic	1795–1875
Robert Roosevelt	1871–1873	New York	Democratic	1829–1906
Erastus Root	1803–1805; 1809–1811; 1815–1817	New York	Democratic-Republican	1773–1846
Erastus Root	1831–1833	New York	Democratic	1773–1846
Joseph M. Root	1845–1849	Ohio	Whig	1807–1879
Joseph M. Root	1849–1851	Ohio	Free Soiler	1807–1879
Logan H. Roots	1868–1871	Arkansas	Republican	1841–1893
Ileana Ros-Lehtinen	1989–2019	Florida	Republican	1952–present
Charlie Rose	1973–1997	North Carolina	Democratic	1939–2012
John Marshall Rose	1917–1923	Pennsylvania	Republican	1856–1923
Max Rose	2019–2021	New York	Democratic	1986–present
Robert L. Rose	1847–1851	New York	Whig	1804–1877
Robert S. Rose	1823–1825	New York	Democratic-Republican	1774–1835
Robert S. Rose	1825–1827	New York	National Republican	1774–1835
Robert S. Rose	1829–1831	New York	Anti-Masonic	1774–1835
William Rosecrans	1881–1885	California	Democratic	1819–1898
Jacky Rosen	2017–2019	Nevada	Democratic	1957–present
Benjamin L. Rosenbloom	1921–1925	West Virginia	Republican	1880–1965
Matt Rosendale	2021–2025	Montana	Republican	1960–present
Benjamin Stanley Rosenthal	1962–1983	New York	Democratic	1923–1983
Peter Roskam	2007–2019	Illinois	Republican	1961–present
Dennis Ross	2011–2019	Florida	Republican	1959–present
Henry H. Ross	1825–1827	New York	National Republican	1790–1862
John Ross	1809–1811; 1815–1818	Pennsylvania	Democratic-Republican	1770–1834
Lewis Winans Ross	1863–1869	Illinois	Democratic	1812–1895
Mike Ross	2001–2013	Arkansas	Democratic	1961–present
Miles Ross	1875–1883	New Jersey	Democratic	1827–1903
Robert Tripp Ross	1947–1949; 1952–1953	New York	Republican	1903–1981
Sobieski Ross	1873–1877	Pennsylvania	Republican	1828–1877
Thomas Ross	1849–1853	Pennsylvania	Democratic	1806–1865
Thomas R. Ross	1819–1825	Ohio	Democratic-Republican	1788–1869
Albert B. Rossdale	1921–1923	New York	Republican	1878–1968
Dan Rostenkowski	1959–1995	Illinois	Democratic	1928–2010
Toby Roth	1979–1997	Wisconsin	Republican	1938–present
William Roth	1967–1971	Delaware	Republican	1921–2003
John Hoover Rothermel	1907–1915	Pennsylvania	Democratic	1856–1922
Keith Rothfus	2013–2019	Pennsylvania	Republican	1962–present
Steve Rothman	1997–2013	New Jersey	Democratic	1952–present
Gideon Frank Rothwell	1879–1881	Missouri	Democratic	1836–1894
Harley Rouda	2019–2021	California	Democratic	1961–present
Richard L. Roudebush	1961–1971	Indiana	Republican	1918–1995
Marge Roukema	1981–2003	New Jersey	Republican	1929–2014
Arthur B. Rouse	1911–1927	Kentucky	Democratic	1874–1956
J. Edward Roush	1959–1969; 1971–1977	Indiana	Democratic	1920–2004
Lovell Rousseau	1865–1866; 1866–1867	Kentucky	Unconditional Unionist	1818–1869
John H. Rousselot	1961–1963; 1970–1983	California	Republican	1927–2003
Harry N. Routzohn	1939–1941	Ohio	Republican	1881–1953
John Rowan	1807–1809	Kentucky	Democratic-Republican	1773–1843
Joseph Rowan	1919–1921	New York	Democratic	1870–1930
William A. Rowan	1943–1947	Illinois	Democratic	1882–1961
Harry E. Rowbottom	1925–1931	Indiana	Republican	1884–1934
Edmund Rowe	1943–1945	Ohio	Republican	1892–1972
Frederick W. Rowe	1915–1921	New York	Republican	1863–1946
Peter Rowe	1853–1855	New York	Democratic	1807–1876
Jonathan H. Rowell	1883–1891	Illinois	Republican	1833–1908
Alfred Rowland	1887–1891	North Carolina	Democratic	1844–1898
Charles Hedding Rowland	1915–1919	Pennsylvania	Republican	1860–1921
J. Roy Rowland	1983–1995	Georgia	Democratic	1926–2022
John G. Rowland	1985–1991	Connecticut	Republican	1957–present
Alphonse Roy	1938–1939	New Hampshire	Democratic	1897–1967
William R. Roy	1971–1975	Kansas	Democratic	1926–2014
Edward R. Roybal	1963–1993	California	Democratic	1916–2005
Lucille Roybal-Allard	1993–2023	California	Democratic	1941–present
Ed Royce	1993–2019	California	Republican	1951–present
Homer Elihu Royce	1857–1861	Vermont	Republican	1819–1891
William Royer	1979–1981	California	Republican	1920–2013
Lemuel W. Royse	1895–1899	Indiana	Republican	1847–1946
Thomas L. Rubey	1911–1921; 1923–1928	Missouri	Democratic	1862–1928
Atterson W. Rucker	1909–1913	Colorado	Democratic	1847–1924
Tinsley W. Rucker Jr.	1917	Georgia	Democratic	1848–1926
William W. Rucker	1899–1923	Missouri	Democratic	1855–1936
Eldon Rudd	1977–1987	Arizona	Republican	1920–2002
Stephen A. Rudd	1931–1936	New York	Democratic	1874–1936
James Edward Ruffin	1933–1935	Missouri	Democratic	1893–1977
Thomas Hart Ruffin	1853–1861	North Carolina	Democratic	1820–1863
Charles H. Ruggles	1821–1823	New York	Federalist	1789–1865
Nathaniel Ruggles	1813–1819	Massachusetts	Federalist	1761–1819
John N. W. Rumple	1901–1903	Iowa	Republican	1841–1903
David Rumsey	1847–1851	New York	Whig	1810–1883
Edward Rumsey	1837–1839	Kentucky	Whig	1796–1868
Donald Rumsfeld	1963–1969	Illinois	Republican	1932–2021
John Runk	1845–1847	New Jersey	Whig	1791–1872
Harold Runnels	1971–1980	New Mexico	Democratic	1924–1980
Jon Runyan	2011–2015	New Jersey	Republican	1973–present
Arthur R. Rupley	1913–1915	Pennsylvania	Republican	1868–1920
Philip Ruppe	1967–1979	Michigan	Republican	1926–2026
Dutch Ruppersberger	2003–2025	Maryland	Democratic	1946–present
Jacob Ruppert	1899–1907	New York	Democratic	1867–1939
Bobby Rush	1993–2023	Illinois	Democratic	1946–present
Harry W. Rusk	1886–1897	Maryland	Democratic	1852–1926
Jeremiah M. Rusk	1871–1877	Wisconsin	Republican	1830–1893
John Russ	1819–1823	Connecticut	Democratic-Republican	1767–1833
Benjamin E. Russell	1893–1897	Georgia	Democratic	1845–1909
Charles A. Russell	1887–1902	Connecticut	Republican	1852–1902
Charles H. Russell	1947–1949	Nevada	Republican	1903–1989
Daniel Lindsay Russell	1879–1881	North Carolina	Greenbacker	1845–1908
David Abel Russell	1835–1837	New York	National Republican	1780–1861
David Abel Russell	1837–1841	New York	Whig	1780–1861
Gordon J. Russell	1902–1910	Texas	Democratic	1859–1919
J. Edward Russell	1915–1917	Ohio	Republican	1867–1953
James M. Russell	1841–1843	Pennsylvania	Whig	1786–1870
Jeremiah Russell	1843–1845	New York	Democratic	1786–1867
John Russell	1805–1809	New York	Democratic-Republican	1772–1842
John E. Russell	1887–1889	Massachusetts	Democratic	1834–1903
Jonathan Russell	1821–1823	Massachusetts	Democratic-Republican	1771–1832
Joseph Russell	1845–1847; 1851–1853	New York	Democratic	1800–1875
Joseph J. Russell	1907–1909; 1911–1919	Missouri	Democratic	1854–1922
Leslie W. Russell	1891	New York	Republican	1840–1903
Richard M. Russell	1935–1937	Massachusetts	Democratic	1891–1977
Sam M. Russell	1941–1947	Texas	Democratic	1889–1971
Samuel L. Russell	1853–1855	Pennsylvania	Whig	1816–1891
Steve Russell	2015–2019	Oklahoma	Republican	1963–present
William Russell	1827–1833	Ohio	Democratic	1782–1845
William Russell	1841–1843	Ohio	Whig	1782–1845
William A. Russell	1879–1885	Massachusetts	Republican	1831–1899
William Fiero Russell	1857–1859	New York	Democratic	1812–1896
Marty Russo	1975–1993	Illinois	Democratic	1944–present
Albert Rust	1855–1857; 1859–1861	Arkansas	Democratic	1818–1870
Earl B. Ruth	1969–1975	North Carolina	Republican	1916–1989
Albert G. Rutherford	1937–1941	Pennsylvania	Republican	1879–1941
J. T. Rutherford	1955–1963	Texas	Democratic	1921–2006
Robert Rutherford	1793–1795	Virginia	Anti-Administration	1728–1803
Robert Rutherford	1795–1797	Virginia	Democratic-Republican	1728–1803
Samuel Rutherford	1925–1932	Georgia	Democratic	1870–1932
John Rutledge Jr.	1797–1803	South Carolina	Federalist	1766–1819
Daniel Bailey Ryall	1839–1841	New Jersey	Democratic	1798–1864
Elmer Ryan	1935–1941	Minnesota	Democratic	1907–1958
Harold M. Ryan	1962–1965	Michigan	Democratic	1911–2007
James Wilfrid Ryan	1899–1901	Pennsylvania	Democratic	1858–1907
Leo Ryan	1973–1978	California	Democratic	1925–1978
Paul Ryan	1999–2019	Wisconsin	Republican	1970–present
Thomas Ryan	1877–1889	Kansas	Republican	1837–1914
Thomas Jefferson Ryan	1921–1923	New York	Republican	1888–1968
Tim Ryan	2003–2023	Ohio	Democratic	1973–present
William Ryan	1893–1895	New York	Democratic	1840–1925
William F. Ryan	1961–1972	New York	Democratic	1922–1972
William H. Ryan	1899–1909	New York	Democratic	1860–1939
John Walker Ryon	1879–1881	Pennsylvania	Democratic	1825–1901
Joseph F. Ryter	1945–1947	Connecticut	Democratic	1914–1978
Jim Ryun	1997–2007	Kansas	Republican	1947–present
