= Charles Baber Cemetery =

Cemetery in Pottsville, Pennsylvania, US

- Interactive map of Charles Baber Cemetery

Details
- Location: 100 West Market Street, Pottsville, Pennsylvania
- Country: United States
- Coordinates: 40.68115°N 76.20903°W
- No. of graves: 10,000+
- Find a Grave: Charles Baber Cemetery

Charles Baber Cemetery is a cemetery in Pottsville, Pennsylvania. The Cemetery is situated on 25 acres of central Pottsville, between 12th and 16th Street.

== History ==
The stone wall which surrounds the entire cemetery was built during the 1800s by members of the Madera family, who were known for their stone masonry skills.

During the early morning hours of Memorial Day in 1891, Edward Fisher, senior vice commander of the Sons of Union Veterans of the Civil War's Gowen Post led a squad of members from the organization in decorating the graves of fallen soldiers and deceased veterans at the cemetery.

During the summer of 1898, a fire completely destroyed the barn on the cemetery's property, which was located behind the Chapel of the Resurrection.

In 1911, newspapers across Pennsylvania reported that the city of Pottsville was "in the throes of an epidemic of diphtheria," that [a]ll of the cases" were "in the proximity of the open sewer that flows through the Charles Baber Cemetery," that this open sewer was carrying "the sewage of Yorkville beyond Sixteenth street and the north side of Market street," and that this sewage flow was several inches deep.

In 2017, the cemetery hosted the city's 29th annual Arbor Day celebration. The 18th year that the celebration was held at the cemetery, the event featured the dedication and blessing of ten new trees, which included bald cypresses, dogwoods, pin oaks, and red buds. The Rev. Clifford B. Carr, the former rector of Pottsville's Trinity Episcopal Church, officiated at the ceremony. According to Carol S. Field, a member of the Charles Baber Preservation Trust, between the years 2000 and 2017, 153 trees had been planted at the cemetery on Arbor Day.

In 2018, Trinity Episcopal Church held summer services at the cemetery's Resurrection Chapel on Sunday mornings from June 17 through September 9 (Baber Day).

The cemetery is managed by a board of trustees from Pottsville's Trinity Episcopal Church and its Charles Baber Cemetery Preservation Trust.

== Notable burials ==
A number of former members of the U.S. House of Representatives and Pennsylvania House of Representatives have been buried at the Charles Baber Cemetery, as have been prominent United States business leaders and other social figures and many former soldiers who fought in the American Civil War, Spanish–American War, World War I and World War II. Among the most notable of those interred here are:

- Charles Napoleon Brumm (1838–1917): A Greenbacker and a Republican member of the U.S. House of Representatives from Pennsylvania
- George Franklin Brumm (1880–1934): Native of Minersville, Pennsylvania who became a Republican member of the U.S. House of Representatives
- Jake Daubert (1884–1924): Major League baseball first baseman from 1910 to 1924 (Brooklyn Dodgers and Cincinnati Reds) who led the National League in batting average in 1913 and 1914, helped the Dodgers reach their first World Series in 1916, and helped the Cincinnati Reds defeat the Chicago White Sox in 1919 World Series
- Francis Wade Hughes (1817–1885): Pennsylvania Senator for the 8th district from 1843 to 1844, Attorney General of Pennsylvania from 1853 to 1855
- Cyrus Maffet Palmer (1887–1959): Republican member of the U.S. House of Representatives
- Henry Clay Pleasants (1833–1880): Coal mining engineer and officer in the Union Army during the American Civil War, who organized the construction of a tunnel filled with explosives under the Confederate lines outside Petersburg, Virginia, which resulted in the Battle of the Crater on July 30, 1864
- Jack Quinn (1883–1946): Major League baseball pitcher
- John Reber (1858–1931): Republican member of the U.S. House of Representatives
- Christian Markle Straub (1804–1860): U.S. Representative for Pennsylvania's 11th congressional district from 1853 to 1855
- David Gottlob Yuengling (1808–1877): Founder and first president of America's oldest brewery, D. G. Yuengling & Son
- Frank D. Yuengling (1876–1963): President and owner of the Pottsville, Pennsylvania brewer, Yuengling
