= Amos Gustine =

American politician (1789–1844)

Member of the U.S. House of Representatives from Pennsylvania's 13th district
- In office May 4, 1841 – March 3, 1843
- Preceded by: Charles McClure
- Succeeded by: Henry Frick

Personal details
- Born: 1789 Pennsylvania, U.S.
- Died: March 3, 1844 (aged 54–55) Juniata County, Pennsylvania, U.S.
- Resting place: Presbyterian Cemetery in Mifflintown, Pennsylvania
- Party: Democratic

Amos Gustine (1789 – March 3, 1844) was a Democratic member of the U.S. House of Representatives from Pennsylvania from 1841 to 1843.

== Biography ==
Born in Pennsylvania in 1789, Gustine was a member of the board of managers of the Mifflin Bridge Company in Mifflin County, Pennsylvania in 1828. He then served as the sheriff of Juniata County, Pennsylvania from 1831 to 1834. Awarded the contract for the first courthouse erected at Mifflintown, Pennsylvania in 1832, he served as a member of the first town council of Mifflintown in 1833, and was also employed as a merchant in that same year.

Gustine was subsequently elected as treasurer of Juniata County in 1837.

=== Congress ===
Elected as a Democrat to the Twenty-seventh Congress, Gustine returned to farming and milling after his tenure of service ended.

== Death and interment ==
Gustine died in Jericho Mills, Pennsylvania on March 3, 1844, and was interred in the Presbyterian Cemetery in Mifflintown, Pennsylvania.

U.S. House of Representatives
Preceded by Charles McClure	Member of the U.S. House of Representatives from Pennsylvania's 13th congressional district 1841–1843	Succeeded by Henry Frick
