= Fred B. Gernerd =

American politician (1879–1948)

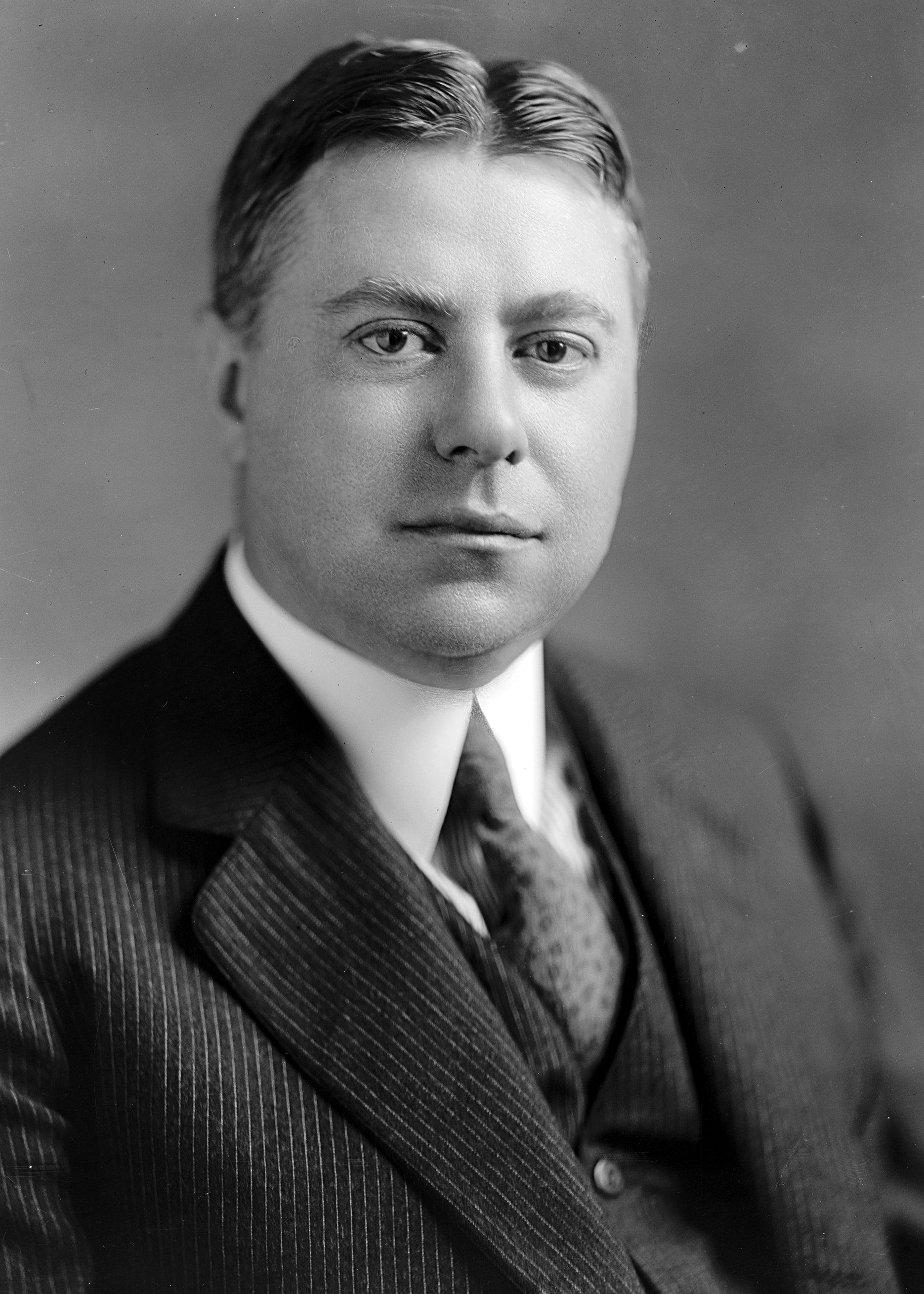
- Gernerd's official portrait in the Library of Congress

Member of the U.S. House of Representatives from Pennsylvania's 13th district
- In office March 4, 1921 – March 3, 1923
- Preceded by: Arthur Granville Dewalt
- Succeeded by: George F. Brumm

Personal details
- Born: Fred Benjamin Gernerd; November 22, 1879 Allentown, Pennsylvania, U.S.
- Died: August 7, 1948 (aged 68) Allentown, Pennsylvania, U.S.
- Resting place: Trexlertown Cemetery in Trexlertown, Pennsylvania
- Party: Republican
- Education: Franklin & Marshall College; Columbia University; Columbia Law School

Fred Benjamin Gernerd (November 22, 1879 – August 7, 1948) was an American lawyer and politician who served one term as a Republican member of the U.S. House of Representatives from Pennsylvania from 1921 to 1923.

== Early life and education ==
Gernerd was born in Allentown, Pennsylvania. He graduated from Franklin and Marshall College in Lancaster, Pennsylvania, in 1901, from Columbia University's school of political science in New York City in 1903, and from Columbia Law School in 1904. He was admitted to the bar in 1904 and commenced practice in Buffalo, New York.

== Career ==
In 1905, he returned to Allentown, serving as district attorney of Lehigh County from 1908 to 1912. He was a Pennsylvania Republican State Committeeman from 1912 to 1920 and a trustee of Franklin & Marshall College in Lancaster, Pennsylvania, and of Cedar Crest College in Allentown.

=== Congress ===
Gernerd was elected as a Republican to the Sixty-seventh Congress but was an unsuccessful candidate for reelection in 1922.

=== After Congress ===
He resumed the practice of law in Allentown and served as a delegate to the 1928 Republican National Convention.

== Death ==
Gernerd died in Allentown, Pennsylvania, on August 7, 1948, at age 68, and is interred in Trexlertown Cemetery in Trexlertown, Pennsylvania.

== Sources ==
- United States Congress. "Fred B. Gernerd (id: G000137)". Biographical Directory of the United States Congress..
- Fred Benjamin Gernerd at The Political Graveyard

U.S. House of Representatives
Preceded by Arthur G. Dewalt	Member of the U.S. House of Representatives from Pennsylvania's 13th congressional district 1921–1923	Succeeded by George F. Brumm
