= Marcus C. L. Kline =

American politician (1855–1911)

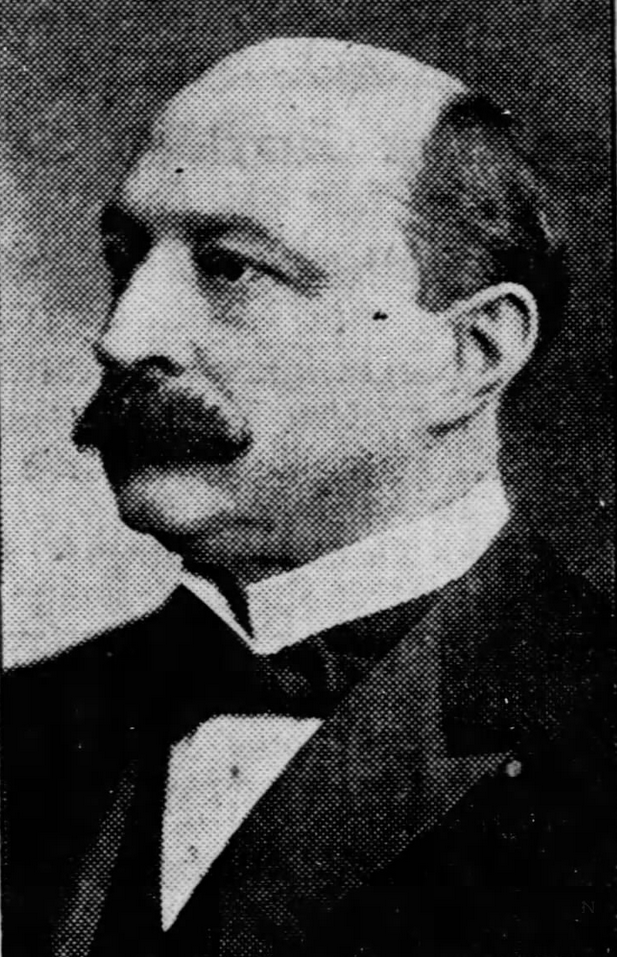

Member of the U.S. House of Representatives from Pennsylvania's 13th district
- In office March 4, 1903 – March 3, 1907
- Preceded by: George R. Patterson
- Succeeded by: John H. Rothermel

Personal details
- Born: Marcus Charles Lawrence Kline; March 26, 1855 Emmaus, Pennsylvania, U.S.
- Died: March 10, 1911 (aged 55) Allentown, Pennsylvania, U.S.
- Resting place: Fairview Cemetery in Allentown
- Party: Democratic
- Education: Muhlenberg College

Marcus Charles Lawrence Kline (March 26, 1855 – March 10, 1911) was an American lawyer, businessman, and politician who served two terms as a Democratic member of the U.S. House of Representatives from Pennsylvania from 1903 to 1907.

== Biography ==
Marcus C. L. Kline was born in Emmaus, Pennsylvania. He graduated from Muhlenberg College in Allentown, Pennsylvania, where he was a member of Chi Phi fraternity. He studied law, was admitted to the bar in 1876, and commenced practicing in Allentown.

=== Early career ===
He served as city solicitor of Allentown in 1877, as district attorney for Lehigh County, Pennsylvania, from 1887 to 1890, and chairman of the Democratic Party in Lehigh County, Pennsylvania, from 1895 to 1899.

He worked as president of the Lehigh Valley Trust Co. from 1899 to 1906.

=== Congress ===
Kline was elected as a Democrat to the Fifty-eighth and Fifty-ninth Congresses. He was not a candidate for renomination in 1906.

=== Later career ===
After Congress, Kline resumed the practice of law and also engaged in banking. He worked as president of the Allentown Trust Co. from 1907 to 1911. He was a delegate to the 1908 Democratic National Convention.

== Death ==
Kline died in Allentown, Pennsylvania, on March 10, 1911, at age 55, and was interred in Fairview Cemetery in Allentown.

== Sources ==
- United States Congress. "Marcus C.L. Kline (id: K000268)". Biographical Directory of the United States Congress.

U.S. House of Representatives
Preceded by George R. Patterson	Member of the U.S. House of Representatives from Pennsylvania's 13th congressional district 1903–1907	Succeeded by John H. Rothermel
