= James Black (Pennsylvania politician) =

American politician

Member of the U.S. House of Representatives from Pennsylvania
- In office March 4, 1843 – March 3, 1847
- Preceded by: John Snyder
- Succeeded by: Jasper E. Brady
- Constituency: 16th district
- In office December 5, 1836 – March 3, 1837
- Preceded by: Jesse Miller
- Succeeded by: Charles McClure
- Constituency: 13th district

Member of the Pennsylvania House of Representatives
- In office 1830-1831

Personal details
- Born: March 6, 1793 Newport, Pennsylvania, U.S.
- Died: June 21, 1872 (aged 79)
- Party: Jacksonian Democratic

James Black (March 6, 1793 – June 21, 1872) was a Jacksonian and Democratic member of the U.S. House of Representatives from Pennsylvania.

James Black was born in Newport, Pennsylvania. He was a member of the Pennsylvania House of Representatives in 1830 and 1831.

Black was elected as a Jacksonian to the Twenty-fourth Congress to fill the vacancy caused by the resignation of Jesse Miller. He served as associate judge of Perry County, Pennsylvania, in 1842 and 1843.

He was again elected as a Democrat to the Twenty-eighth and Twenty-ninth Congresses. After his time in congress, he served as State collector of tolls on the Juniata Canal. He died in New Bloomfield, Pennsylvania, in 1872. Interment in New Bloomfield Cemetery.

U.S. House of Representatives
Preceded by Jesse Miller	Member of the U.S. House of Representatives from Pennsylvania's 13th congressional district 1836–1837	Succeeded by Charles McClure
Preceded by John Snyder	Member of the U.S. House of Representatives from Pennsylvania's 16th congressional district 1843–1847	Succeeded by Jasper E. Brady
