= Charles McClure =

American politician

Charles McClure (1804 – January 10, 1846) was a Democratic member of the U.S. House of Representatives from Pennsylvania.

Charles McClure was born on Willow Grove farm, near Carlisle, Pennsylvania. He graduated from Dickinson College in Carlisle in 1824. He studied law, was admitted to the bar in 1826 and practiced. He was a member of the Pennsylvania House of Representatives in 1835.

McClure was elected as a Democrat to the Twenty-fifth Congress. He was elected to the Twenty-sixth Congress to fill the vacancy caused by the death of William S. Ramsey. He served as secretary of state of Pennsylvania from 1843 to 1845, and was active in promoting the public-school system of Pennsylvania. He died in Allegheny, Pennsylvania, in 1846, and is interred in Allegheny Cemetery in Pittsburgh, Pennsylvania.

== Sources ==
- United States Congress. "Charles McClure (id: M000345)". Biographical Directory of the United States Congress.
- The Political Graveyard

U.S. House of Representatives
Preceded by James Black	Member of the U.S. House of Representatives from Pennsylvania's 13th congressional district 1837–1839	Succeeded by William S. Ramsey
Preceded by William S. Ramsey	Member of the U.S. House of Representatives from Pennsylvania's 13th congressional district 1840–1841	Succeeded by Amos Gustine
