= Henry Pleasants =

Union United States Army general (1833–1880)

Henry Clay Pleasants
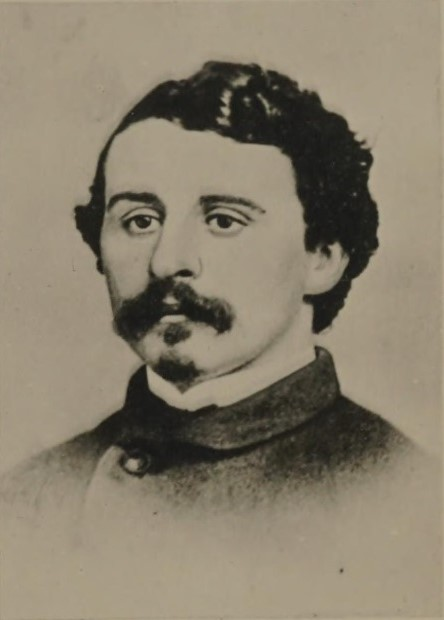
- Born: February 16, 1833; Buenos Aires, Argentine Confederation
- Died: March 26, 1880 (aged 47); Pottsville, Pennsylvania, U.S.
- Burial place: Charles Baber Cemetery, Pottsville, Pennsylvania, U.S.
- Military career
- Allegiance: United States of America: Union
- Branch: Union Army
- Service years: 1861–1865
- Rank: Lieutenant Colonel; Brevet Brigadier General
- Units: 6th Pennsylvania Infantry Regiment; 48th Pennsylvania Infantry Regiment
- Commands: 2nd Bde, 2nd Div, IX Corps
- Conflicts: American Civil War

Henry Clay Pleasants (February 16, 1833 – March 26, 1880) was a coal mining engineer and an officer in the Union Army during the American Civil War. He is best known for organizing the building of a tunnel filled with explosives under the Confederate lines outside Petersburg, Virginia, which resulted in the Battle of the Crater on July 30, 1864. The Union troops, however, failed in their opportunity to break the Siege of Petersburg.

== Early life and career ==
Pleasants was born in Buenos Aires, Argentina, to an American father and a Spanish mother. He did not live in the United States until he was 13, when he was sent to school in Philadelphia. He worked for the Pennsylvania Railroad and in anthracite coal mines.

In 1857, he moved to Pottsville, Pennsylvania, to become a civil engineer in the local mining industry. In 1860, he married Sarah "Sallie" Bannan, daughter of publisher Benjamin Bannan, but she died of illness on October 15 of that same year. A tradition, probably apocryphal, states that Pleasants's decision to join the army the following year was motivated by a desire to be killed in battle and join her in death.

== Civil War ==
With the outbreak of hostilities, Pleasants became a second lieutenant in the 6th Pennsylvania Volunteer Infantry, which enlisted for only three months. He re-enlisted as a captain in the 48th Pennsylvania Volunteer Infantry Regiment in July 1861. The regiment initially saw service in the Western Theater but came to the Eastern Theater and fought in such battles as Antietam, Second Bull Run, Fredericksburg and in the Wilderness.

By 1864, Pleasants had risen to lieutenant colonel and commanded the 48th Pennsylvania, which was one of the units outside Petersburg. Many of the 48th were coal miners, and Pleasants supposedly heard his men suggest running a shaft under the Confederate lines. Pleasants went to his superiors, who approved the plan. He battled a lack of supplies as well as a lack of interest on the part of Union generals until other attacks on Petersburg had failed.

He was successful in his construction to such an extent that the explosion killed nearly 300 Confederate soldiers. However, the Union troops, under Ambrose Burnside, failed to take advantage of the explosion and suffered considerable casualties in what is known as the Battle of the Crater. The Confederates recovered their original position.

Pleasants was appointed to temporary command the 2nd Brigade, 2nd Division, IX Corps, June 18, 1864, to June 25, 1865. He was mustered out of the volunteers on December 18, 1864.

On January 13, 1866, President Andrew Johnson nominated Pleasants for appointment to the grade of brevet brigadier general of volunteers, to rank from March 13, 1865, and the United States Senate confirmed the appointment on March 12, 1866. His brevet appointment citation specifically mentions his service at Petersburg.

== Later life ==
Pleasants returned to Pottsville after mustering out of the army and resumed his role as a mining engineer for the Philadelphia and Reading Coal and Iron Company, rising to the positions of chief engineer and then superintendent. He died at Pottsville, Pennsylvania on March 27, 1880, and was buried in the Charles Baber Cemetery in Pottsville.

== In popular culture ==
Harry Turtledove's alternate history novel The Guns of the South features Pleasants as a significant character.

== See also ==
- Hispanics in the American Civil War
- List of American Civil War brevet generals (Union)
