= George R. Patterson =

American politician (1863–1906)

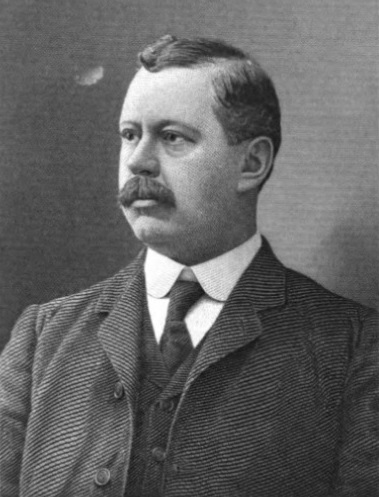

Member of the U.S. House of Representatives from Pennsylvania's 13th district
- In office March 4, 1901 – March 21, 1906
- Preceded by: James W. Ryan
- Succeeded by: Marcus Kline

Personal details
- Born: George Robert Patterson; November 9, 1863 Lewistown, Pennsylvania, U.S.
- Died: March 21, 1906 (aged 42) Washington, D.C., U.S.
- Resting place: Citizens’ Cemetery in Ashland, Pennsylvania
- Party: Republican

George Robert Patterson (November 9, 1863 – March 21, 1906) was an American businessman and politician who served three terms as a Republican member of the U.S. House of Representatives from Pennsylvania from 1901 until his death in 1906.

== Biography ==
George R. Patterson was born in Lewistown, Pennsylvania. He attended the Lewistown Academy, and was engaged in mercantile pursuits in 1880. He moved to Ashland, Pennsylvania, in 1886 and engaged in the wholesale grain and feed business.

=== Convention delegate ===
He was a delegate to the Republican National Convention in 1900 and 1904.

=== Congress ===
Patterson was elected as a Republican to the Fifty-seventh, Fifty-eighth, and Fifty-ninth Congresses and served until his death in Washington, D.C. on March 21, 1906.

Interment in Citizens’ Cemetery in Ashland.

== See also ==
- List of members of the United States Congress who died in office (1900–1949)

== Sources ==
- United States Congress. "George R. Patterson (id: P000115)". Biographical Directory of the United States Congress.
- The Political Graveyard
- George Robert Patterson, Late a Representative from Pennsylvania. 1907 U.S. Government Printing Office

U.S. House of Representatives
Preceded by James W. Ryan	Member of the U.S. House of Representatives from Pennsylvania's 13th congressional district 1901–1903	Succeeded by Marcus C.L. Kline
Preceded by Henry W. Palmer	Member of the U.S. House of Representatives from Pennsylvania's 12th congressional district 1903–1906	Succeeded by Charles N. Brumm
