= Henry Frick (politician) =

American politician (1795–1844)

Member of the U.S. House of Representatives from Pennsylvania's 13th district
- In office March 4, 1843 – March 1, 1844
- Preceded by: Amos Gustine
- Succeeded by: James Pollock

Member of the Pennsylvania House of Representatives
- In office 1828-1831

Personal details
- Born: March 17, 1795 Northumberland, Pennsylvania, U.S.
- Died: March 1, 1844 (aged 48) Washington, D.C., U.S.
- Party: Whig

Henry Frick (March 17, 1795 – March 1, 1844) was a Whig member of the U.S. House of Representatives from Pennsylvania.

== Biography ==
Henry Frick was born in Northumberland, Pennsylvania. He attended public schools and apprenticed to a printer in Philadelphia. He served in the War of 1812. He settled in Milton, Pennsylvania, in 1816, and established the Miltonian, a political journal, with which he was connected for over twenty years. He was a member of the Pennsylvania House of Representatives from 1828 to 1831.

Frick was elected as a Whig to the Twenty-eighth Congress and served until his death in Washington, D.C., in 1844. Interment in the Congressional Cemetery.

== See also ==
- List of members of the United States Congress who died in office (1790–1899)

== Sources ==
- United States Congress. "Henry Frick (id: F000383)". Biographical Directory of the United States Congress.
- The Political Graveyard

U.S. House of Representatives
Preceded by Amos Gustine	Member of the U.S. House of Representatives from Pennsylvania's 13th congressional district 1843–1844	Succeeded by James Pollock
