= Cyrus M. Palmer =

American politician (1887–1959)

Cyrus Maffet Palmer (February 12, 1887 – August 16, 1959) was a Republican member of the U.S. House of Representatives from Pennsylvania.

== Formative years ==
Born in Pottsville, Pennsylvania on February 12, 1887, Cyrus M. Palmer attended the University of Pennsylvania in Philadelphia, Pennsylvania, where he studied law, beginning in 1907. Admitted to the bar in 1911, he then opened his legal practice in Pottsville.

== Public service and legal career ==
Palmer served in the Pennsylvania State House of Representatives from 1916 to 1920 and as district attorney of Schuylkill County, Pennsylvania from 1920 to 1927.

He was elected as a Republican to the Seventieth Congress, but was an unsuccessful candidate for renomination in 1928. After his time in Congress, he resumed the practice of law, and became an alternate delegate to the Republican National Convention at Philadelphia in 1940.

Palmer was elected judge of the common pleas court of Schuylkill County, twenty-first judicial district of Pennsylvania, in 1931, and reelected in 1941 and 1951. He then became president judge of the court January 1, 1940, and served until his death.

== Death and interment ==
Palmer died in Pottsville on August 16, 1959, and was buried in that city's Charles Baber Cemetery.

== Sources ==
- United States Congress. "Cyrus M. Palmer (id: P000037)". Biographical Directory of the United States Congress.
- The Political Graveyard

U.S. House of Representatives
Preceded by George F. Brumm	Member of the U.S. House of Representatives from Pennsylvania's 13th congressional district 1927–1929	Succeeded by George F. Brumm
