= James X. McLanahan =

American politician

Chair of the House Judiciary Committee
- In office March 4, 1851 – March 4, 1853
- Preceded by: James Thompson
- Succeeded by: Frederick P. Stanton

Member of the United States House of Representatives from Pennsylvania's 16th district
- In office March 4, 1849 – March 4, 1853
- Preceded by: Jasper E. Brady
- Succeeded by: William H. Kurtz

Member of the Pennsylvania Senate from the 14th district
- In office 1841–1842
- Preceded by: William R. Gorgas
- Succeeded by: Jesse C. Horton

Member of the Pennsylvania Senate from the 18th district
- In office 1843–1844

Personal details
- Born: May 17, 1809 Greencastle, Pennsylvania, US
- Died: December 16, 1861 (aged 52) New York City, US
- Party: Democratic

James Xavier McLanahan (May 17, 1809 – December 16, 1861) was an American lawyer and politician who served two terms as a Democratic member of the U.S. House of Representatives for Pennsylvania's 16th congressional district from 1849 to 1853.

== Early life and education ==
McLanahan was born near Greencastle, Pennsylvania, to William and Mary (Gregg) McLanahan. He was the grandson of Pennsylvania Senator Andrew Gregg and second cousin to Pennsylvania Governor Andrew Gregg Curtin. He graduated from Dickinson College in Carlisle, Pennsylvania, in 1827. He studied law under George Chambers who went on to become a Congressman and Pennsylvania Supreme Court justice. He was admitted to the bar in 1837 and commenced practice in Chambersburg, Pennsylvania.

== Career ==
He served as a member of the Pennsylvania State Senate for the 14th district from 1841 to 1842 and for the 18th district from 1843 to 1844.

=== Congress ===
McLanahan was elected as a Democrat to the Thirty-first and Thirty-second Congresses. He was the chairman of the United States House Committee on the Judiciary during the Thirty-second Congress. He was not a candidate for renomination in 1852.

== Death ==
He resumed the practice of law and died in New York City in 1861, aged 52.

== Sources ==
- United States Congress. "James X. McLanahan (id: M000534)". Biographical Directory of the United States Congress.
- The Political Graveyard

Pennsylvania State Senate
Preceded by William R. Gorgas	Member of the Pennsylvania Senate, 14th district 1841-1842	Succeeded by Jesse C. Horton
Preceded by	Member of the Pennsylvania Senate, 18th district 1843-1844	Succeeded by
U.S. House of Representatives
Preceded by Jasper E. Brady	Member of the U.S. House of Representatives from Pennsylvania's 16th congressional district 1849–1853	Succeeded by Carlton B. Curtis
