= Jasper Ewing Brady =

American politician

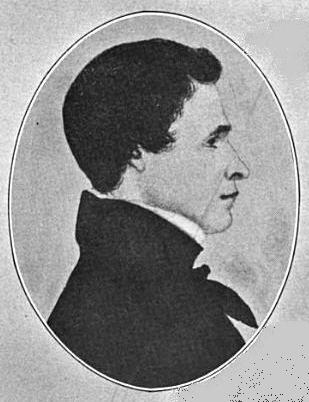

Member of the U.S. House of Representatives from Pennsylvania's 16th district
- In office March 4, 1847 – March 3, 1849
- Preceded by: James Black
- Succeeded by: James X. McLanahan

Personal details
- Born: March 4, 1797 Sunbury, Pennsylvania, U.S.
- Died: January 26, 1871 (aged 73)
- Resting place: Rock Creek Cemetery; Washington, D.C., U.S.
- Party: Whig

Jasper Ewing Brady (March 4, 1797 – January 26, 1871) was a Whig member of the U.S. House of Representatives from Pennsylvania.

Jasper E. Brady was born in Sunbury, Pennsylvania. He learned the hatter's trade and taught school in Franklin County, Pennsylvania. He studied law, was admitted to the bar in 1827 and commenced practice in Chambersburg, Pennsylvania. He served as treasurer of Franklin County, Pennsylvania, for three years. He was a member of the Pennsylvania House of Representatives in 1844 and 1845.

Brady was elected as a Whig to the Thirtieth Congress. He was an unsuccessful candidate for reelection in 1848. He moved to Pittsburgh, Pennsylvania, in September 1849 and resumed the practice of law. He served as a clerk in the office of the paymaster general in the War Department in Washington, D.C., from 1861 to 1869. He retired from active business pursuits in 1869 and resided in Washington, D.C., until his death in 1871. He was interred in City Cemetery in Sunbury, Pennsylvania, and later reinterred in Rock Creek Cemetery in Washington, D.C., in 1893.

== Sources ==
- United States Congress. "Jasper Ewing Brady (id: B000754)". Biographical Directory of the United States Congress.
- The Political Graveyard
- "Jasper Ewing Brady (1797-1871)". Famous Bradys. The Brady Family Heritage Association. Archived from the original on March 3, 2016.

U.S. House of Representatives
Preceded by James Black	Member of the U.S. House of Representatives from Pennsylvania's 16th congressional district 1847–1849	Succeeded by James X. McLanahan
