= Arthur G. Dewalt =

American politician (1854–1931)

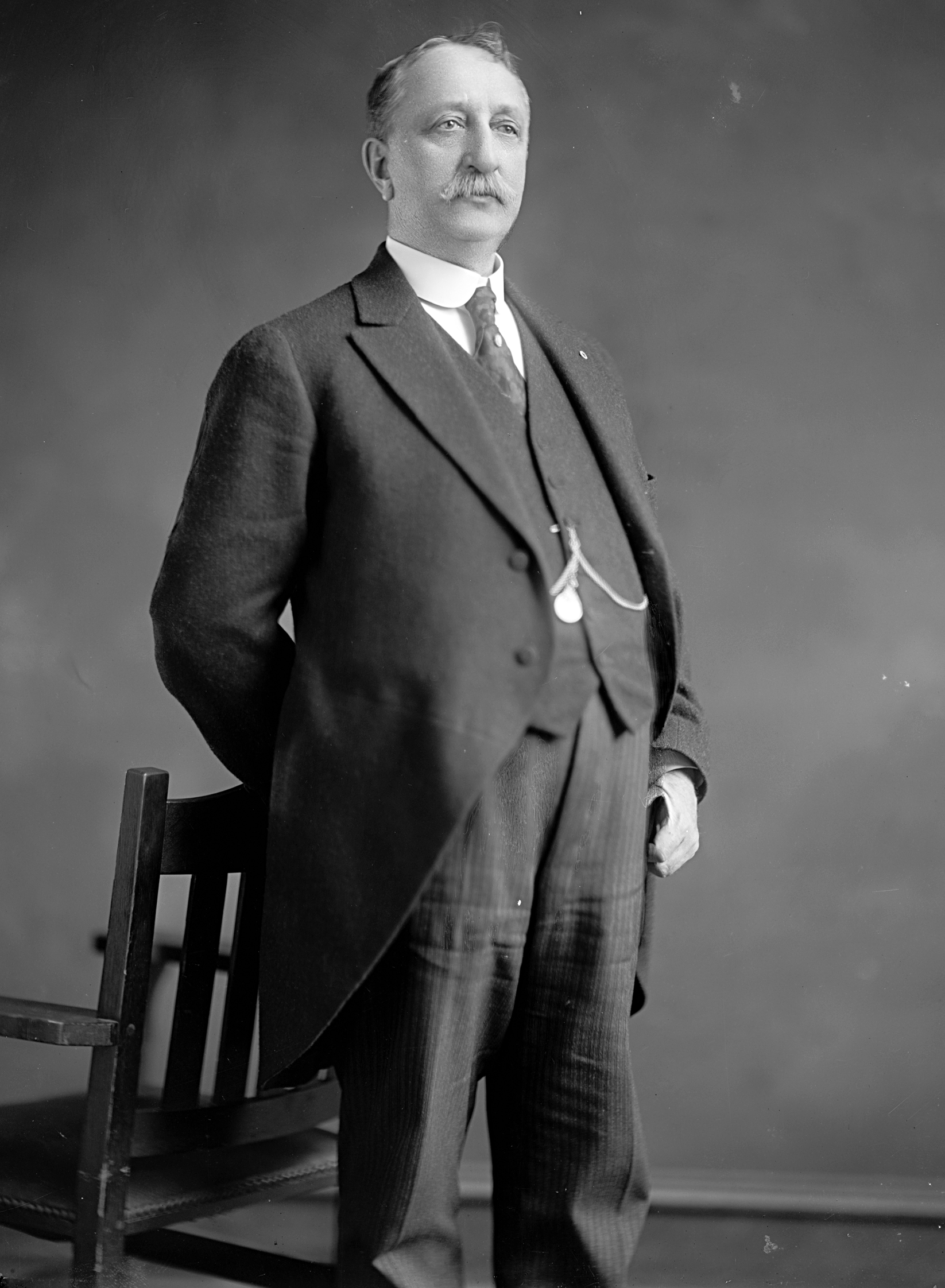

Member of the U.S. House of Representatives from Pennsylvania's 13th district
- In office March 4, 1915 – March 3, 1921
- Preceded by: John H. Rothermel
- Succeeded by: Fred Benjamin Gernerd

Member of the Pennsylvania Senate for the 16th district
- In office 1902–1910
- Preceded by: Harry Gibson Stiles
- Succeeded by: James A. Miller

Personal details
- Born: October 11, 1854 Bath, Pennsylvania
- Died: October 26, 1931 (aged 77) Allentown, Pennsylvania
- Party: Democratic
- Education: Lafayette College

Arthur Granville Dewalt (October 11, 1854 – October 26, 1931) was an American politician from Pennsylvania who served as a Democratic member of the U.S. House of Representatives for Pennsylvania's 13th congressional district from 1915 to 1921.

== Biography ==
Arthur G. Dewalt was born in Bath, Pennsylvania. He graduated from the Keystone State Normal School in 1870 and from Lafayette College in Easton, Pennsylvania, in 1874 and was a member of Chi Phi fraternity.

He studied law under John D. Stiles, was admitted to the bar in 1877 and commenced practice at Allentown, Pennsylvania, in 1878. He was district attorney of Lehigh County, Pennsylvania, from 1880 to 1883. He was admitted to the Pennsylvania Supreme Court in 1883 and to all the courts of Philadelphia in 1888.

He was a member of the Pennsylvania State Senate for the 16th district from 1903 to 1910. In 1906, he led the investigation of the Pennsylvania State Capitol Graft Scandal. He was a delegate to the Democratic National Convention in 1904 and 1908, and chairman of the Democratic State committee in 1909 and 1910. He served as adjutant of the Fourth Regiment of the Pennsylvania National Guard for ten years.

Dewalt was elected as a Democrat to the Sixty-fourth, Sixty-fifth, and Sixty-sixth Congresses. He declined to be a candidate for renomination in 1920. He was an unsuccessful candidate for election in 1926. He resumed the practice of law at Allentown, where he later died.

== Sources ==
- United States Congress. "Arthur G. Dewalt (id: D000288)". Biographical Directory of the United States Congress..
- Arthur Granville Dewalt at The Political Graveyard

Pennsylvania State Senate
Preceded by Harry Gibson Stiles	Member of the Pennsylvania Senate, 16th district 1902-1910	Succeeded by James A. Miller
U.S. House of Representatives
Preceded by John H. Rothermel	Member of the U.S. House of Representatives from Pennsylvania's 13th congressional district 1915–1921	Succeeded by Fred B. Gernerd
