= George F. Brumm =

American politician (1878–1934)

George Franklin Brumm
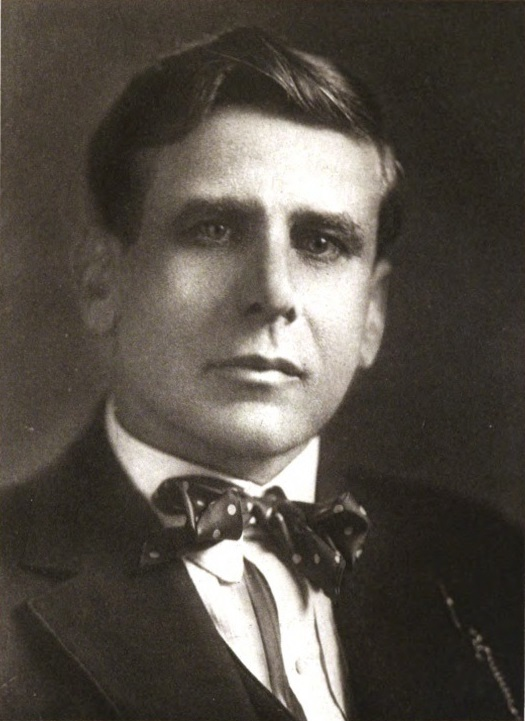
- Frontispiece of 1935's George F. Brumm, Late a Representative from Pennsylvania

Member of the U.S. House of Representatives from Pennsylvania's 13th district
- In office March 4, 1929 – May 29, 1934
- Preceded by: Cyrus M. Palmer
- Succeeded by: James H. Gildea
- In office March 4, 1923 – March 3, 1927
- Preceded by: Fred B. Gernerd
- Succeeded by: Cyrus M. Palmer

Personal details
- Born: January 24, 1878 Minersville, Pennsylvania, U.S.
- Died: May 29, 1934 (aged 56)
- Party: Republican

George Franklin Brumm (January 24, 1878 – May 29, 1934) was a Republican member of the U.S. House of Representatives from Pennsylvania.

George F. Brumm was born in 1878 in Minersville, Pennsylvania. His father was Congressman Charles N. Brumm. He graduated from the University of Pennsylvania in Philadelphia, Pennsylvania, in 1901, and from the University of Pennsylvania Law School in 1907. He served in a Pennsylvania National Guard engineer unit on the Mexican border in 1916. He was the election commissioner for Texas in 1918 to take the vote of servicemen at cantonments, and an attorney for the conscription board during World War I. He was an unsuccessful Republican candidate for the nomination to Congress in 1918 and 1920.

Brumm was elected as a Republican to the Sixty-eighth and to the succeeding Congress. He served as chairman of the United States House Committee on Expenditures in the Department of the Navy during the Sixty-ninth Congress. He was an unsuccessful candidate for renomination in 1926. He was again elected to the Seventy-first and to the two succeeding Congresses. He died in office in Philadelphia, Pennsylvania, and was buried in Charles Baber Cemetery in Pottsville, Pennsylvania.

== See also ==
- List of members of the United States Congress who died in office (1900–1949)

== Sources ==
- United States Congress. "George F. Brumm (id: B000978)". Biographical Directory of the United States Congress.
- The Political Graveyard

U.S. House of Representatives
Preceded by Fred B. Gernerd	Member of the U.S. House of Representatives from Pennsylvania's 13th congressional district 1923–1927	Succeeded by Cyrus M. Palmer
Preceded by Cyrus M. Palmer	Member of the U.S. House of Representatives from Pennsylvania's 13th congressional district 1929–1934	Succeeded by James H. Gildea
