= Pennsylvania's 13th congressional district =

U.S. House district for Pennsylvania

Coordinates: 40°07′26″N 75°09′36″W

- Interactive map of district boundaries since January 3, 2023
- Representative: John Joyce; R–Hollidaysburg
- Population (2025): 769,675
- Median household income: $70,590
- Ethnicity: 89.6% White; 3.7% Hispanic; 3.2% Two or more races; 2.4% Black; 0.7% Asian; 0.4% other
- Cook PVI: R+23

The 13th congressional district of Pennsylvania is a congressional district in the U.S. state of Pennsylvania. The district contains all of Adams, Bedford, Blair, Cambria, Franklin, Fulton, Huntingdon, Juniata, Mifflin, and Perry counties. It also includes slivers of Cumberland and Somerset counties. Republican John Joyce has represented the district since 2019. With a Cook Partisan Voting Index rating of R+23, it is the most Republican district in Pennsylvania.

Prior to February 2018, the district was located in southeastern Pennsylvania, covering eastern Montgomery County and Northeast Philadelphia. The district traditionally included most of Montgomery County, but was redrawn in 2002 to include part of Philadelphia, and altered again in 2012. The Supreme Court of Pennsylvania redrew the district in February 2018 after ruling the previous map unconstitutional. The old 13th district became the 4th district, and what was the ninth district in the southwest part of the state was modified and redesignated the 13th district, for the 2018 elections and representation thereafter.

The previously drawn district had long been a Republican stronghold, like many suburban districts in the Northeast. However, the brand of Republicanism in southeastern Pennsylvania was a moderate one, and the district, like the Philadelphia suburbs as a whole, became friendlier to Democrats during the 1990s as the national party veered to the right. The district had not voted Republican for president since 1988. In 1992, the district elected its first Democratic representative in 86 years, Marjorie Margolies-Mezvinsky. She was defeated in 1994 by Republican Jon D. Fox, but Joe Hoeffel regained the seat for the Democrats in 1998. It was in Democratic hands afterward, becoming even more Democratic after being pushed into Philadelphia after the 2000 census. In 2018, it was redistricted again by court order, becoming the most Republican congressional district in the Northeast.

== Demographics ==
As of the census of 2000, there were 647,435 people, 250,845 households, and 169,848 families residing in the district. The racial makeup of the district was 87.16% White, 6.05% Black or African American, 0.14% Native American, 4.05% Asian, 0.00% Pacific Islander, 1.32% from other races, and 1.24% from two or more races. 3.06% of the population were Hispanic or Latino of any race.

There were 250,845 households, out of which 30.4% had children under the age of 18 living with them, 53.3% were married couples living together, 10.8% had a female householder with no husband present, and 32.3% were non-families. 27.9% of all households were made up of individuals, and 12.6% had someone living alone who was 65 years of age or older. The average household size was 2.51, and the average family size was 3.09.

In the district, the population was spread out, with 23.5% under the age of 18, 7.1% from 18 to 24, 29.2% from 25 to 44, 22.9% from 45 to 64, and 17.3% who were 65 years of age or older. The median age was 39 years. For every 100 females there were 92.0 males. For every 100 females age 18 and over, there were 88.2 males.

The median income for a household in the district was $49,319, and the median income for a family was $61,108. Males had a median income of $36,441 versus $23,719 for females. The per capita income for the district was $25,053. About 5.1% of families and 7.1% of the population were below the poverty line, including 6.8% of those under age 18 and 8.5% of those age 65 or over.

== Recent election results from statewide races ==
Year	Office	Results
2008	President	McCain 61% – 37%
2008	Attorney General	Corbett 70% – 30%
2008	Auditor General	Beiler 53% – 47%
2010	Senate	Toomey 68% – 32%
2010	Governor	Corbett 72% – 28%
2012	President	Romney 67% – 33%
2012	Senate	Smith 64% – 36%
2014	Governor	Corbett 60% – 40%
2016	President	Trump 71% – 25%
2016	Senate	Toomey 67% – 27%
2016	Attorney General	Rafferty Jr. 68% – 32%
2016	Auditor General	Brown 62% – 31%
2016	Treasurer	Voit III 62% – 31%
2018	Senate	Barletta 64% – 34%
2018	Governor	Wagner 63% – 35%
2020	President	Trump 72% – 27%
2020	Attorney General	Heidelbaugh 69% – 28%
2020	Auditor General	DeFoor 72% – 24%
2020	Treasurer	Garrity 71% – 26%
2022	Senate	Oz 68% – 29%
2022	Governor	Mastriano 64% – 34%
2024	President	Trump 72% – 27%
2024	Senate	McCormick 70% – 28%
2024	Attorney General	Sunday 72% – 25%
2024	Auditor General	DeFoor 72% – 25%
2024	Treasurer	Garrity 73% – 25%

== Counties and municipalities ==
Adams County (34)

All 34 municipalities

Bedford County (38)

All 38 municipalities

Blair County (25)

All 25 municipalities

Cambria County (63)

All 63 municipalities

Cumberland County (22)

Hopewell Township, Lower Mifflin Township, Newburg, North Newton Township (part; also 10th), Shippensburg Borough (shared with Franklin County), Shippensburg Township, Southampton Township, Upper Frankford Township, Upper Mifflin Township

Franklin County (22)

All 22 municipalities

Fulton County (13)

All 13 municipalities

Huntingdon County (48)

All 48 municipalities

Juniata County (17)

All 17 municipalities

Mifflin County (16)

All 16 municipalities

Perry County (30)

All 30 municipalities

Somerset County (1)

Conemaugh Township (part; also 14th)

== List of members representing the district ==
Representative	Party	Years	Cong ress	Electoral history
District established March 4, 1813
Vacant		March 4, 1813 – May 13, 1813	13th	Member-elect John Smilie was redistricted from the 9th district and re-elected in 1812 but died December 30, 1812.
Isaac Griffin (New Geneva)	Democratic-Republican	May 13, 1813 – March 3, 1817	13th 14th	Elected to finish John Smilie's term. Re-elected in 1814. Retired.
Christian Tarr (Brownsville)	Democratic-Republican	March 4, 1817 – March 3, 1821	15th 16th	Elected in 1816. Re-elected in 1818. Lost re-election.
Andrew Stewart (Uniontown)	Democratic-Republican	March 4, 1821 – March 3, 1823	17th	Elected in 1820. Redistricted to the 14th district.
John Tod (Bedford)	Democratic-Republican	March 4, 1823 – ????, 1824	18th	Redistricted from the 8th district and re-elected in 1822. Resigned to become judge of Court of Common Pleas of 16th judicial district.
Vacant		?????, 1824 – December 6, 1824	18th	
Alexander Thomson (Bedford)	Democratic-Republican	December 6, 1824 – March 3, 1825	18th 19th	Elected October 12, 1824, to finish Tod's term. Elected the same day in 1824 to the next term. Resigned.
Alexander Thomson (Bedford)	Jacksonian	March 4, 1825 – May 1, 1826	18th 19th	Elected October 12, 1824, to finish Tod's term. Elected the same day in 1824 to the next term. Resigned.
Vacant		May 1, 1826 – December 4, 1826	19th	
Chauncey Forward (Somerset)	Jacksonian	December 4, 1826 – March 3, 1831	19th 20th 21st	Elected October 10, 1826, to finish Thomson's term and seated December 4, 1826. Elected the same day in 1826 to the next term. Re-elected in 1828. Retired.
George Burd (Bedford)	Anti-Jacksonian	March 4, 1831 – March 3, 1833	22nd	Elected in 1830. Redistricted to the 18th district.
Jesse Miller (Landisburg)	Jacksonian	March 4, 1833 – October 30, 1836	23rd 24th	Elected in 1832. Re-elected in 1834. Resigned to become the First Auditor of the United States Department of the Treasury.
Vacant		October 30, 1836 – December 5, 1836	24th	
James Black (Newport)	Jacksonian	December 5, 1836 – March 3, 1837	24th	Elected to finish Miller's term. [data missing]
Charles McClure (Carlisle)	Democratic	March 4, 1837 – March 3, 1839	25th	Elected in 1836. [data missing]
William Sterrett Ramsey (Carlisle)	Democratic	March 4, 1839 – October 17, 1840	26th	Elected in 1838. Died.
Vacant		October 17, 1840 – December 7, 1840	26th	
Charles McClure (Carlisle)	Democratic	December 7, 1840 – March 3, 1841	26th	Elected to finish Ramsey's term. [data missing]
Amos Gustine (Mifflintown)	Democratic	May 4, 1841 – March 3, 1843	27th	Elected in 1840. [data missing]
Henry Frick (Milton)	Whig	March 4, 1843 – March 1, 1844	28th	Elected in 1842. Died.
Vacant		March 1, 1844 – April 5, 1844	28th	
James Pollock (Milton)	Whig	April 5, 1844 – March 3, 1849	28th 29th 30th	Elected to finish Frick's term. Re-elected in 1844. Re-elected in 1846. [data missing]
Joseph Casey (New Berlin)	Whig	March 4, 1849 – March 3, 1851	31st	Elected in 1848. Retired.
James Gamble (Jersey Shore)	Democratic	March 4, 1851 – March 3, 1853	32nd	Elected in 1850. Redistricted to the 15th district.
Asa Packer (Mauch Chunk)	Democratic	March 4, 1853 – March 3, 1857	33rd 34th	Elected in 1852. Re-elected in 1854. [data missing]
William H. Dimmick (Honesdale)	Democratic	March 4, 1857 – March 3, 1861	35th 36th	Elected in 1856. Re-elected in 1858. [data missing]
Philip Johnson (Easton)	Democratic	March 4, 1861 – March 3, 1863	37th	Elected in 1860. Redistricted to the 11th district.
Henry W. Tracy (Standing Stone)	Independent Republican	March 4, 1863 – March 3, 1865	38th	Elected in 1862. [data missing]
Ulysses Mercur (Towanda)	Republican	March 4, 1865 – December 2, 1872	39th 40th 41st 42nd	Elected in 1864. Re-elected in 1866. Re-elected in 1868. Re-elected in 1870. Resigned to become associate justice of the Supreme Court of Pennsylvania.
Vacant		December 2, 1872 – December 24, 1872	42nd	
Frank C. Bunnell (Tunkhannock)	Republican	December 24, 1872 – March 3, 1873	42nd	Elected to finish Mercur's term. [data missing]
James D. Strawbridge (Danville)	Republican	March 4, 1873 – March 3, 1875	43rd	Elected in 1872. [data missing]
James B. Reilly (Pottsville)	Democratic	March 4, 1875 – March 3, 1879	44th 45th	Elected in 1874. Re-elected in 1876. Lost re-election.
John W. Ryon (Pottsville)	Democratic	March 4, 1879 – March 3, 1881	46th	Elected in 1878. [data missing]
Charles N. Brumm (Minersville)	Greenback	March 4, 1881 – March 3, 1885	47th 48th 49th 50th	Elected in 1880. Re-elected in 1882. [data missing]
Charles N. Brumm (Minersville)	Republican	March 4, 1885 – March 3, 1889	47th 48th 49th 50th	Elected in 1884. Re-elected in 1886. [data missing]
James B. Reilly (Pottsville)	Democratic	March 4, 1889 – March 3, 1895	51st 52nd 53rd	Elected in 1888. Re-elected in 1890. Re-elected in 1892. [data missing]
Charles N. Brumm (Minersville)	Republican	March 4, 1895 – March 3, 1899	54th 55th	Elected in 1894. Re-elected in 1896. [data missing]
James W. Ryan (Pottsville)	Democratic	March 4, 1899 – March 3, 1901	56th	Elected in 1898. [data missing]
George R. Patterson (Ashland)	Republican	March 4, 1901 – March 3, 1903	57th	Elected in 1900. Redistricted to the 12th district.
Marcus C.L. Kline (Allentown)	Democratic	March 4, 1903 – March 3, 1907	58th 59th	Elected in 1902. Re-elected in 1904. [data missing]
John H. Rothermel (Reading)	Democratic	March 4, 1907 – March 3, 1915	60th 61st 62nd 63rd	Elected in 1906. Re-elected in 1908. Re-elected in 1910. Re-elected in 1912. [data missing]
Arthur G. Dewalt (Allentown)	Democratic	March 4, 1915 – March 3, 1921	64th 65th 66th	Elected in 1914. Re-elected in 1916. Re-elected in 1918. [data missing]
Fred B. Gernerd (Allentown)	Republican	March 4, 1921 – March 3, 1923	67th	Elected in 1920. [data missing]
George F. Brumm (Minersville)	Republican	March 4, 1923 – March 3, 1927	68th 69th	Elected in 1922. Re-elected in 1924. [data missing]
Cyrus M. Palmer (Pottsville)	Republican	March 4, 1927 – March 3, 1929	70th	Elected in 1926. [data missing]
George F. Brumm (Minersville)	Republican	March 4, 1929 – May 29, 1934	71st 72nd 73rd	Elected in 1928. Re-elected in 1930. Re-elected in 1932. Died.
Vacant		May 29, 1934 – January 3, 1935	73rd	
James H. Gildea (Coaldale)	Democratic	January 3, 1935 – January 3, 1939	74th 75th	Elected in 1934. Re-elected in 1936. [data missing]
Ivor D. Fenton (Mahanoy City)	Republican	January 3, 1939 – January 3, 1945	76th 77th 78th	Elected in 1938. Re-elected in 1940. Re-elected in 1942. Redistricted to the 12th district.
Daniel K. Hoch (Reading)	Democratic	January 3, 1945 – January 3, 1947	79th	Redistricted from the 14th district and re-elected in 1944. [data missing]
Frederick Augustus Muhlenberg (Wernersville)	Republican	January 3, 1947 – January 3, 1949	80th	Elected in 1946. Lost re-election.
George M. Rhodes (Reading)	Democratic	January 3, 1949 – January 3, 1953	81st 82nd	Elected in 1948. Re-elected in 1950. Redistricted to the 14th district.
Samuel K. McConnell Jr. (Wynnewood)	Republican	January 3, 1953 – September 1, 1957	83rd 84th 85th	Redistricted from the 16th district and re-elected in 1952. Re-elected in 1954. Re-elected in 1956. Resigned.
Vacant		September 1, 1957 – November 5, 1957	85th	
John A. Lafore Jr. (Haverford)	Republican	November 5, 1957 – January 3, 1961	85th 86th	Elected to finish McConnell's term. Re-elected in 1958. Lost renomination.
Richard Schweiker (Worcester)	Republican	January 3, 1961 – January 3, 1969	87th 88th 89th 90th	Elected in 1960. Re-elected in 1962. Re-elected in 1964. Re-elected in 1966. Retired to run for U.S. senator.
R. Lawrence Coughlin (Plymouth Meeting)	Republican	January 3, 1969 – January 3, 1993	91st 92nd 93rd 94th 95th 96th 97th 98th 99th 100th 101st 102nd	Elected in 1968. Re-elected in 1970. Re-elected in 1972. Re-elected in 1974. Re-elected in 1976. Re-elected in 1978. Re-elected in 1980. Re-elected in 1982. Re-elected in 1984. Re-elected in 1986. Re-elected in 1988. Re-elected in 1990. Retired.
Marjorie Margolies-Mezvinsky (Narberth)	Democratic	January 3, 1993 – January 3, 1995	103rd	Elected in 1992. Lost re-election.
Jon D. Fox (Elkins Park)	Republican	January 3, 1995 – January 3, 1999	104th 105th	Elected in 1994. Re-elected in 1996. Lost re-election.
Joe Hoeffel (Abington Township)	Democratic	January 3, 1999 – January 3, 2005	106th 107th 108th	Elected in 1998. Re-elected in 2000. Re-elected in 2002. Retired to run for U.S. senator.
Allyson Schwartz (Abington Township)	Democratic	January 3, 2005 – January 3, 2015	109th 110th 111th 112th 113th	Elected in 2004. Re-elected in 2006. Re-elected in 2008. Re-elected in 2010. Re-elected in 2012. Retired to run for Governor of Pennsylvania
Brendan Boyle (Philadelphia)	Democratic	January 3, 2015 – January 3, 2019	114th 115th	Elected in 2014. Re-elected in 2016. Re-districted to the 2nd district.
John Joyce (Hollidaysburg)	Republican	January 3, 2019 – present	116th 117th 118th 119th	Elected in 2018. Re-elected in 2020. Re-elected in 2022. Re-elected in 2024. Re-elected in 2026.

== Recent election results ==
Year	Election	Winner	Party	Votes	%	Nominated opponent	Party	Votes	%
2000	General	Joseph M. Hoeffel	Democratic	146,026	53%	Stewart Greenleaf	Republican	126,501	46%
2002	General	Joseph M. Hoeffel	Democratic	107,945	51%	Melissa Brown	Republican	100,295	47%
2004	General	Allyson Schwartz	Democratic	171,763	56%	Melissa Brown	Republican	127,205	41%
2006	General	Allyson Schwartz	Democratic	147,368	66%	Raj Bhakta	Republican	75,492	34%
2008	General	Allyson Schwartz	Democratic	196,868	63%	Marina Kats	Republican	108,271	35%
2010	General	Allyson Schwartz	Democratic	117,798	56%	Dee Adcock	Republican	91,195	44%
2012	General	Allyson Schwartz	Democratic	209,901	69%	Joe Rooney	Republican	93,918	31%
2014	General	Brendan Boyle	Democratic	123,601	67%	Dee Adcock	Republican	60,549	33%
2016	General	Brendan Boyle	Democratic	239,316	100%	None			
2018	General	John Joyce	Republican	178,533	70%	Brent Ottaway	Democratic	74,733	29%
2020	General	John Joyce	Republican	267,789	73.5%	Todd Rowley	Democratic	96,612	26.5%
2022	General	John Joyce	Republican	260,345	100%	None			

== Historical district boundaries ==
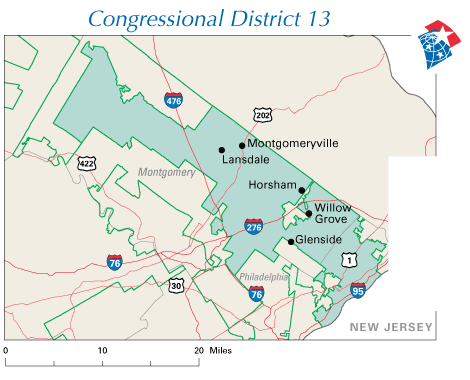
2003–2013

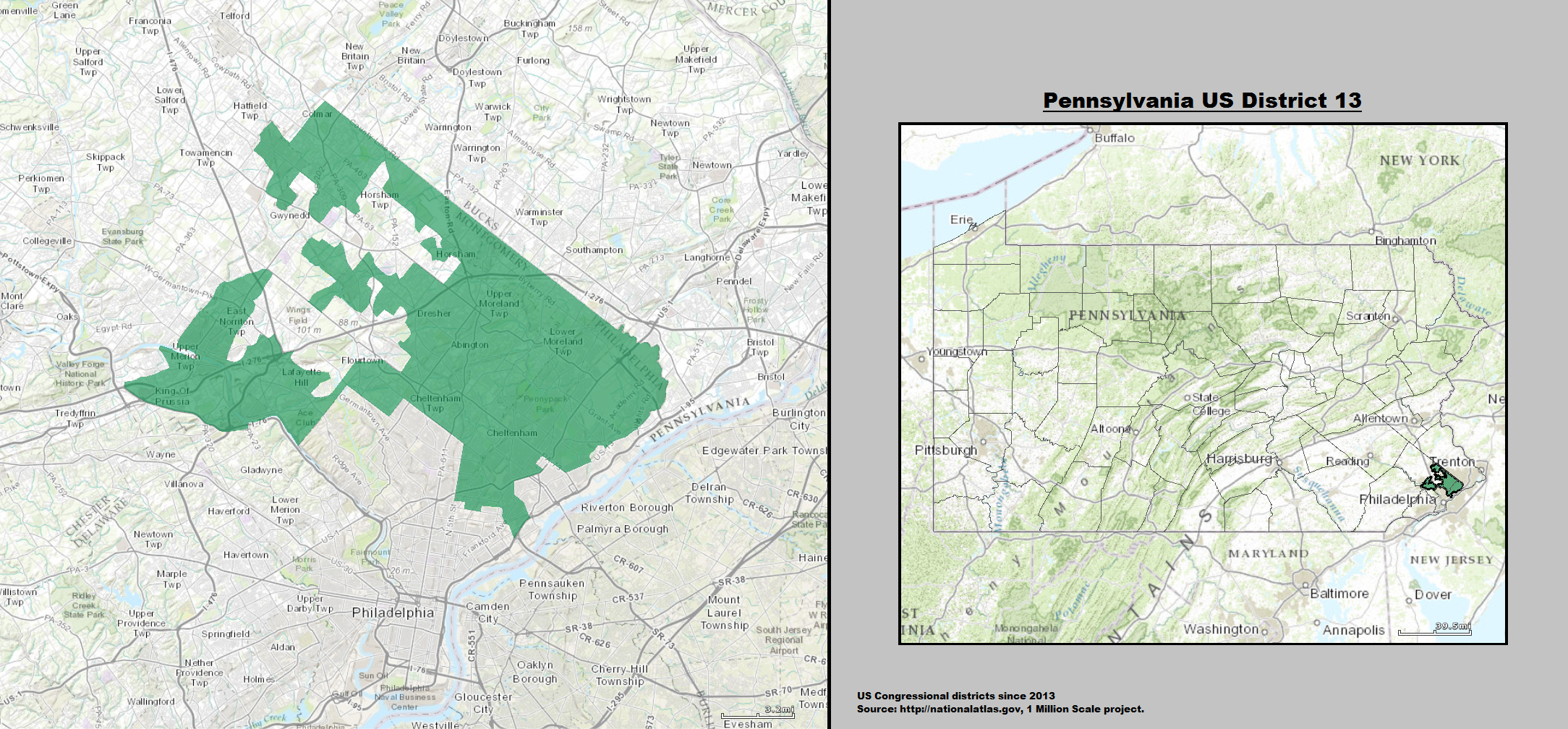
2013–2019

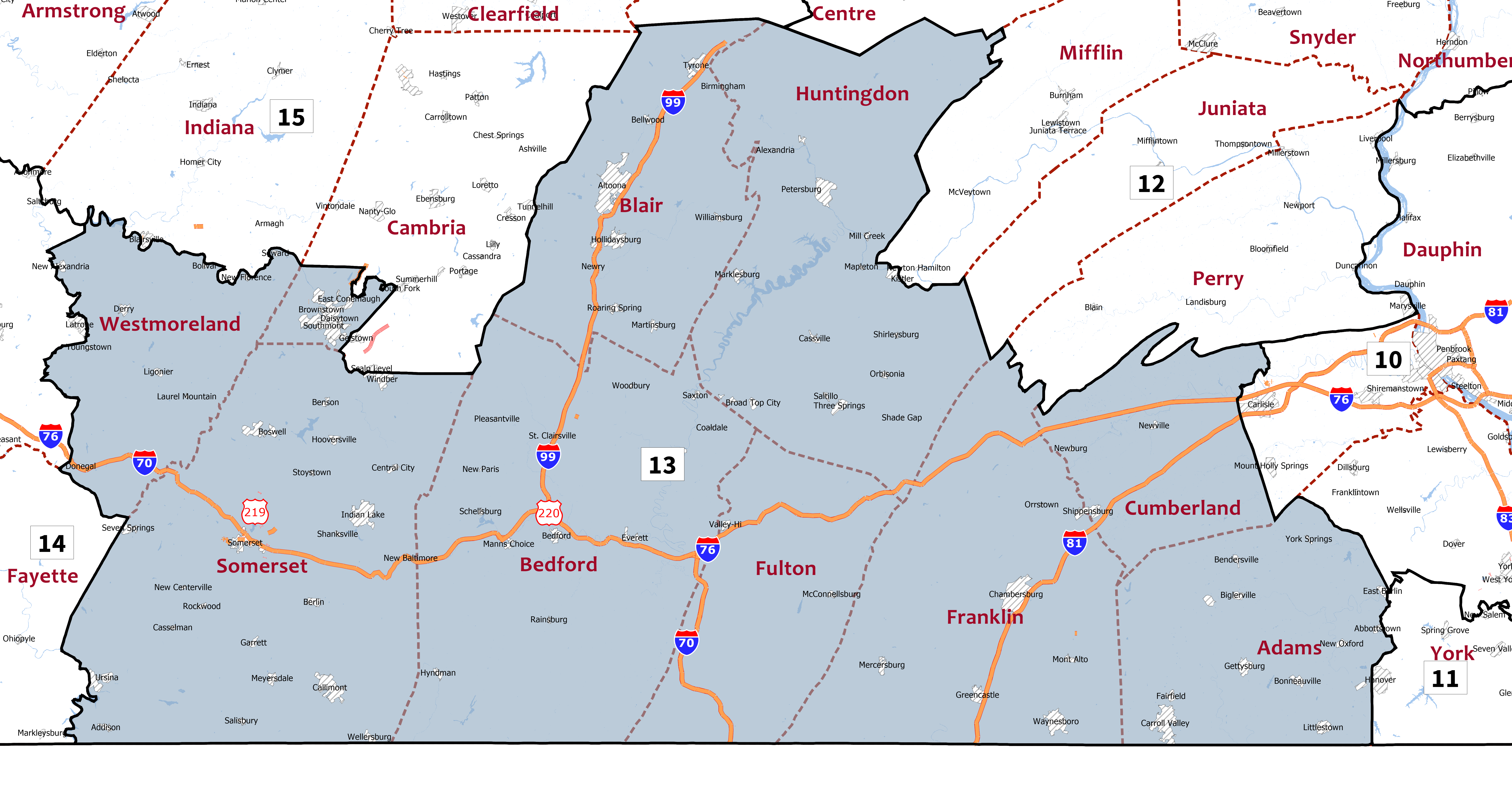
2019–2023

== See also ==
- List of United States congressional districts
- Pennsylvania's congressional districts
