= Jesse Miller (politician) =

American politician (1800–1850)

Member of the U.S. House of Representatives from Pennsylvania's 13th district
- In office March 4, 1833 – October 30, 1836
- Preceded by: George Burd
- Succeeded by: James Black

Member of the Pennsylvania Senate for the 16th district
- In office 1827–1832
- Preceded by: Alexander Mahon
- Succeeded by: John C. Plumer

Personal details
- Born: 1800 Landisburg, Pennsylvania, U.S.
- Died: August 20, 1850 (aged 49–50) Harrisburg, Pennsylvania, U.S.

Jesse Miller (1800 – August 20, 1850) was an American politician from Pennsylvania who served as a Jacksonian member of the U.S. House of Representatives from 1833 to 1836.

Jesse Miller (father of William Henry Miller) was born near Landisburg, Pennsylvania. He was the first clerk to county commissioner of Perry County, Pennsylvania, from 1820 to 1823. He was sheriff of Perry County from 1823 to 1826. He was a member of the Pennsylvania House of Representatives from 1826 until February 7, 1828, when he resigned. He served in the Pennsylvania State Senate for the 16th district from 1827 to 1832.

Miller elected as a Jacksonian to the Twenty-third and Twenty-fourth Congresses and served until his resignation on October 30, 1836. He served as chairman of the United States House Committee on Invalid Pensions during the Twenty-third and Twenty-fourth Congresses. He was the First Auditor of the United States Department of the Treasury, by appointment of President Andrew Jackson, 1836-1842. He was canal commissioner of Pennsylvania in 1844 and 1845 and Secretary of the Commonwealth of Pennsylvania from 1845 to 1848. He died in Harrisburg, Pennsylvania, in 1850. Interment in Harrisburg Cemetery.

== Sources ==
- United States Congress. "Jesse Miller (id: M000734)". Biographical Directory of the United States Congress.
- The Political Graveyard

Pennsylvania State Senate
| Preceded by Alexander Mahon | Member of the Pennsylvania Senate, 16th district 1827-1832 | Succeeded by John C. Plumer |
U.S. House of Representatives
| Preceded by George Burd | Member of the U.S. House of Representatives from Pennsylvania's 13th congressional district 1833–1836 | Succeeded by James Black |
