= John Walker Ryon =

American politician (1825–1901)

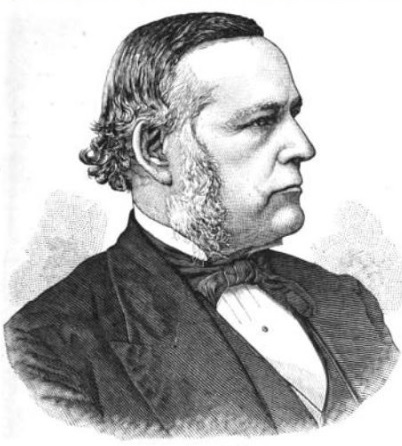

Member of the U.S. House of Representatives from Pennsylvania's 13th district
- In office March 4, 1879 – March 4, 1881
- Preceded by: James Bernard Reilly
- Succeeded by: Charles N. Brumm

Personal details
- Born: John Walker Ryon; March 4, 1825 Elkland, Pennsylvania, US
- Died: March 12, 1901 (aged 76) Pottsville, Pennsylvania, U.S.
- Resting place: St. Patrick's (No. 3) Cemetery
- Party: Democratic
- Education: Millville Academy in Orleans County, New York, and Wellsboro Academy in Wellsboro, Pennsylvania

John Walker Ryon (March 4, 1825 – March 12, 1901) was a 19th Century American lawyer, Civil War veteran, and politician who served as a Democratic member of the U.S. House of Representatives from Pennsylvania from 1879 to 1881.

== Biography ==
John W. Ryon was born in Elkland, Pennsylvania on March 4, 1825. He attended the common schools, Millville Academy in Orleans County, New York, and Wellsboro Academy in Wellsboro, Pennsylvania.

=== Lawyer ===
He then studied law, was admitted to the bar in 1847, and open a law practice in Lawrenceville, Pennsylvania.

From 1850 to 1856, he was district attorney of Tioga County, Pennsylvania.

=== Civil War ===
During the American Civil War, Ryon assisted with the organization of Company A of the famous Bucktail Regiment, and was then appointed by Governor Andrew Gregg Curtin as paymaster with the rank of major in the reserve corps.

=== Return to legal practice ===
Post-war he moved to Pottsville, Pennsylvania, and resumed the practice of law.

=== Congress ===
Ryon was elected as a Democrat to the Forty-sixth Congress. He served as president of the Pennsylvania National Bank for several years.

== Death and burial ==
Ryon died in Pottsville on March 12, 1901, and was interred in St. Patrick's (No. 3) Cemetery.

U.S. House of Representatives
Preceded by James Bernard Reilly	Member of the U.S. House of Representatives from Pennsylvania's 13th congressional district 1879–1881	Succeeded by Charles N. Brumm
