= William S. Ramsey =

American politician (1810–1840)

Member of the U.S. House of Representatives from Pennsylvania's 13th district
- In office March 4, 1839 – October 17, 1840
- Preceded by: Charles McClure
- Succeeded by: Charles McClure

Personal details
- Born: William Sterrett Ramsey; June 12, 1810 Carlisle, Pennsylvania, U.S.
- Died: October 17, 1840 (aged 30) Baltimore, Maryland, U.S.
- Cause of death: Suicide
- Resting place: Ashland Cemetery, Carlisle, Pennsylvania, U.S.
- Party: Democratic
- Education: Dickinson College
- Profession: Politician, lawyer

William Sterrett Ramsey (June 12, 1810 – October 17, 1840) was an American politician and lawyer who served in the United States House of Representatives from 1839 to his death in 1840. He represented the 13th congressional district of Pennsylvania as a Democrat in the 26th United States Congress.

== Early life and education ==
Ramsey was born in Carlisle, Pennsylvania on June 12, 1810. He attended Dickinson College before being sent to Europe in 1829 to complete his studies, serving as attaché of the American Legation in London. Ramsey was sent to France in July 1830 before returning to the United States in 1831, where he studied under his own father in Carlisle.

== Career ==
Ramsey was admitted to the bar in 1833.

Ramsey was elected as a Democrat to represent the 13th congressional district of Pennsylvania in the 26th United States Congress. His term began on March 4, 1839.

== Death ==
Although Ramsey was re-elected to the 27th United States Congress, he took his own life at the age of 30 at a hotel in Baltimore, Maryland on October 17, 1840. He was interred in Ashland Cemetery, located in Carlisle, Pennsylvania. Democrat Charles McClure was elected to serve out the remainder of Ramsey's term.

== See also ==
- List of members of the United States Congress who died in office (1790–1899)

U.S. House of Representatives
Preceded by Charles McClure	Member of the U.S. House of Representatives from Pennsylvania's 13th congressional district 1839–1840	Succeeded by Charles McClure
