= Charles N. Brumm =

American politician (1838–1917)

Charles Napoleon Brumm
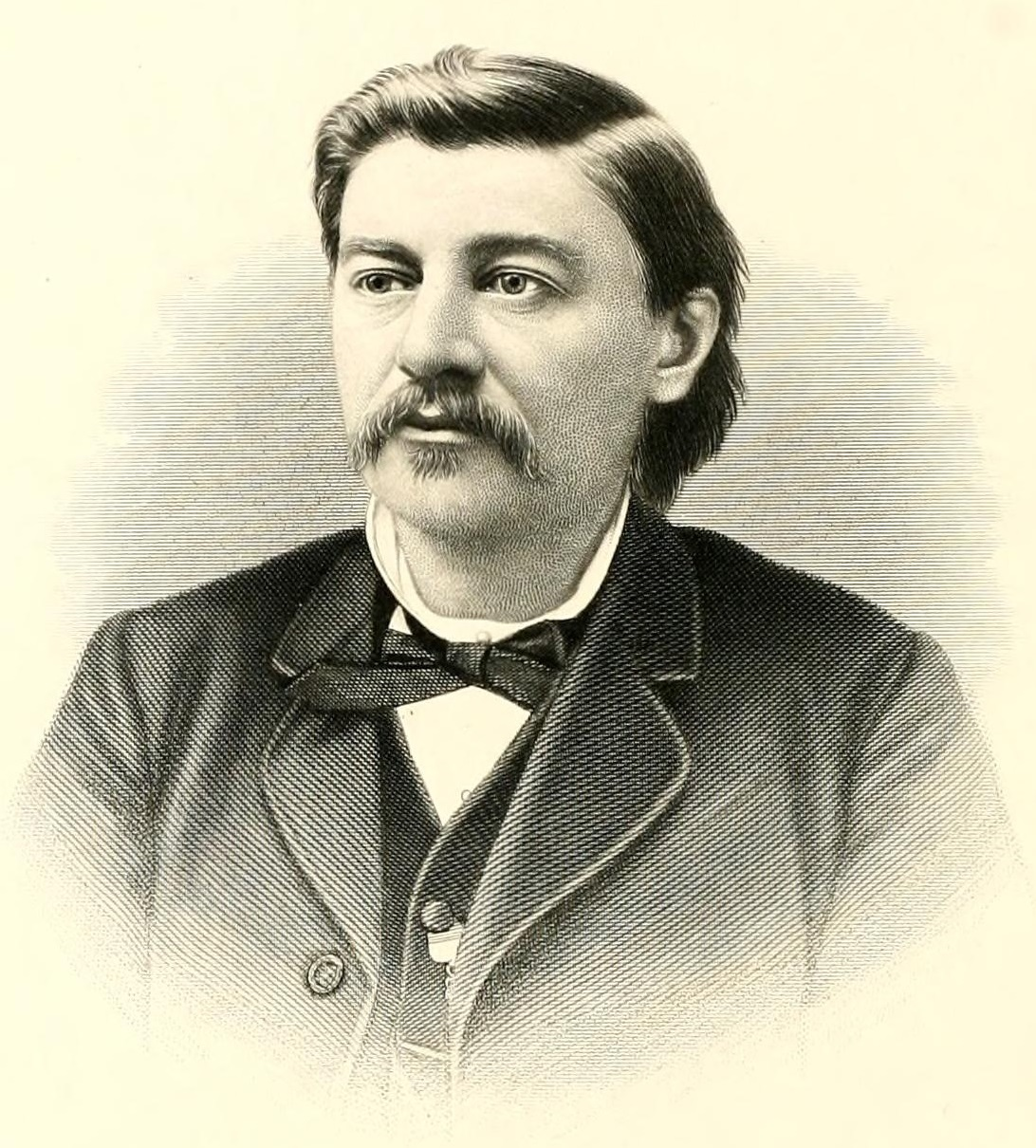
- From 1881's History of Schuylkill County, Pa.

Member of the U.S. House of Representatives from Pennsylvania
- In office November 6, 1906 – January 4, 1909
- Preceded by: George R. Patterson
- Succeeded by: Alfred B. Garner
- Constituency: 12th district
- In office March 4, 1895 – March 3, 1899
- Preceded by: James B. Reilly
- Succeeded by: James W. Ryan
- Constituency: 13th district
- In office March 4, 1881 – March 3, 1889
- Preceded by: John W. Ryon
- Succeeded by: James B. Reilly
- Constituency: 13th district

Personal details
- Born: June 9, 1838 Pottsville, Pennsylvania
- Died: January 11, 1917 (aged 78)
- Party: Greenback (1881–1885); Republican

Charles Napoleon Brumm (June 9, 1838 – January 11, 1917) was a Greenbacker and a Republican member of the U.S. House of Representatives from Pennsylvania.

== Early life and education ==
Charles N. Brumm was born in Pottsville, Pennsylvania. He attended the common schools and Pennsylvania College in Gettysburg, Pennsylvania. He studied law for two years.

== Civil War ==
Under the first call of President Abraham Lincoln for three-months’ men, Brumm enlisted as a private and was elected the first lieutenant of Company I, Fifth Regiment, Pennsylvania Volunteer Infantry. He reenlisted in 1861 for three years and was elected first lieutenant of Company K, Seventy-sixth Regiment, Pennsylvania Volunteer Infantry. He was detailed on the staff of General Barton as assistant quartermaster and aide-de-camp, which position he held under General Barton and General Galusha Pennypacker until the expiration of his term of service in 1871.

== Congressional service ==
After the war, Brumm resumed the study of law and was admitted to the bar in 1871. However, he was an unsuccessful candidate for election in 1878.

Brumm was elected as a Greenbacker to the Forty-seventh and Forty-eighth Congresses and as a Republican to the Forty-ninth and Fiftieth Congresses. He was an unsuccessful candidate for reelection in 1888. He was a delegate to the 1884 Republican National Convention.

Brumm was elected as a Republican to the 54th and 55th Congresses and served as chairman of the United States House Committee on Claims during these years. He was an unsuccessful candidate for renomination in 1898.

Brumm was again elected to the 59th Congress to fill the vacancy caused by the death of George R. Patterson. He was reelected to the 60th Congress and served until 1909 when he resigned, having been elected judge of the Schuylkill County Court of Common Pleas. He served as Chairman of the United States House Committee on Mileage during the Sixtieth Congress.

He served as judge until his death at Minersville, Pennsylvania.

== Inventions ==
Brumm was known for having a very mechanical mind. He was granted letters patent on a meat cutter, and also invented a brick and mortar elevator, a railroad snow shove, and a self-starting car-brake.

He is the father of Congressman George Franklin Brumm.

== See also ==
U.S. House of Representatives
Preceded by John W. Ryon	Member of the U.S. House of Representatives from Pennsylvania's 13th congressional district 1881–1889	Succeeded by James B. Reilly
Preceded by James B. Reilly	Member of the U.S. House of Representatives from Pennsylvania's 13th congressional district 1895–1899	Succeeded by James W. Ryan
Preceded by George R. Patterson	Member of the U.S. House of Representatives from Pennsylvania's 12th congressional district 1906–1909	Succeeded by Alfred B. Garner
