= John H. Rothermel =

American politician (1856–1922)

John Hoover Rothermel
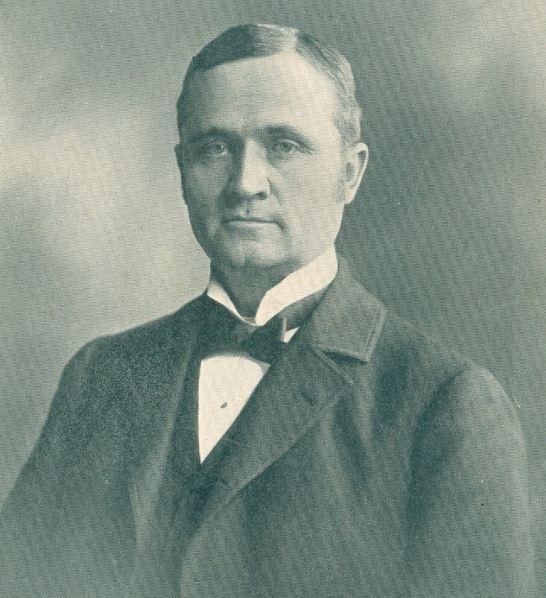

Member of the U.S. House of Representatives from Pennsylvania's 13th district
- In office March 4, 1907 – March 4, 1915
- Preceded by: Marcus C. L. Kline
- Succeeded by: Arthur G. Dewalt

Personal details
- Born: March 7, 1856 Richmond Township, Pennsylvania, U.S.
- Died: August 1922 (aged 66) Reading, Pennsylvania, U.S.
- Resting place: Charles Evans Cemetery
- Party: Democratic

John Hoover Rothermel (March 7, 1856 – August 1922) was an American lawyer and politician who served four terms as a Democratic member of the U.S. House of Representatives from Pennsylvania from 1907 to 1915.

== Biography ==
John H. Rothermel was born in Richmond Township, Pennsylvania. He pursued an academic course at Brunner's Business College in Reading, Pennsylvania. He taught school in Blandon Township, Pennsylvania, from 1876 to 1881. He served as a member of the faculty at Brunner's Scientific Academy. He studied law, was admitted to the bar in 1881 and commenced practice in Reading.

=== Early career ===
Rothermel worked as an assistant district attorney of Reading from 1886 to 1889. He served as county solicitor of Berks County, Pennsylvania from 1895 to 1898. He was an unsuccessful candidate for judge of the court of common pleas in 1899.

=== Congress ===
Rothermel was elected as a Democrat to the Sixtieth and to the three succeeding Congresses, serving from 1907 to 1915.

He served as the chairman of the United States House Committee on Expenditures in the Department of Commerce and Labor during the Sixty-second Congress, and of the United States House Committee on Expenditures in the Department of Commerce during the Sixty-third Congress. He was an unsuccessful candidate for reelection in 1914.

=== Later career and death ===
He resumed the practice of law, and died in Reading in 1922. Interment in Reading's Charles Evans Cemetery.

== Sources ==
- United States Congress. "John H. Rothermel (id: R000461)". Biographical Directory of the United States Congress.
- The Political Graveyard

U.S. House of Representatives
Preceded by Marcus C. L. Kline	Member of the U.S. House of Representatives from Pennsylvania's 13th congressional district 1907–1915	Succeeded by Arthur G. Dewalt
