= James W. Ryan =

American politician (1858–1907)

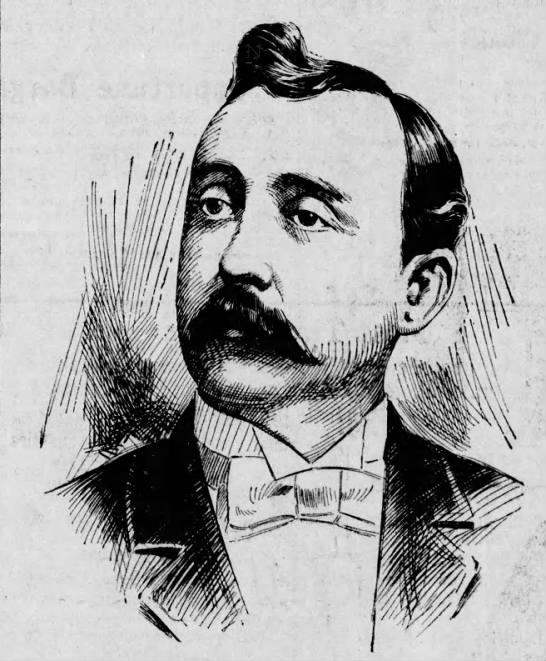

Member of the U.S. House of Representatives from Pennsylvania's 13th district
- In office Match 4, 1899 – March 3, 1901
- Preceded by: Charles N. Brumm
- Succeeded by: George R. Patterson

Personal details
- Born: James Wilfrid Ryan; October 16, 1858 Norwegian Township, Pennsylvania
- Died: February 26, 1907 (aged 48) Mahanoy City, Pennsylvania
- Resting place: Holy Rosary Cemetery in Frackville
- Party: Democratic
- Profession: lawyer

James Wilfrid Ryan (October 16, 1858 – February 26, 1907) was an American lawyer and politician who served one-term as a Democratic member of the U.S. House of Representatives from Pennsylvania from 1899 to 1901.

== Life and career ==
James W. Ryan was born in Norwegian Township, Pennsylvania. He moved to Mahanoy City, Pennsylvania, with his parents, where he attended the public schools. He graduated from the high school of Frackville, Pennsylvania.

=== Early career ===
After this he was a school teacher for a short time. He studied law, was admitted to the bar in 1884 and commenced practice in Pottsville, Pennsylvania.

He was elected district attorney in 1892 and served until January 1896.

=== Congress ===
Ryan was elected as a Democrat to the Fifty-sixth Congress.

=== Death and burial ===
After his time in Congress, he resumed the practice of law and died in Mahanoy City in 1907. He was buried in the Holy Rosary Cemetery in Frackville.

== Sources ==
- United States Congress. "James W. Ryan (id: R000557)". Biographical Directory of the United States Congress.
- The Political Graveyard

U.S. House of Representatives
Preceded by Charles N. Brumm	Member of the U.S. House of Representatives from Pennsylvania's 13th congressional district 1899–1901	Succeeded by George R. Patterson
