= List of former United States representatives (B) =

This is a complete list of former United States representatives whose last names begin with the letter B.

== Number of years and terms the member has served ==
The number of years the representative/delegate has served in Congress indicates the number of terms the representative/delegate has. Note the representative/delegate can also serve non-consecutive terms if the representative/delegate loses election and wins re-election to the House.

- 2 years - 1 or 2 terms
- 4 years - 2 or 3 terms
- 6 years - 3 or 4 terms
- 8 years - 4 or 5 terms
- 10 years - 5 or 6 terms
- 12 years - 6 or 7 terms
- 14 years - 7 or 8 terms
- 16 years - 8 or 9 terms
- 18 years - 9 or 10 terms
- 20 years - 10 or 11 terms
- 22 years - 11 or 12 terms
- 24 years - 12 or 13 terms
- 26 years - 13 or 14 terms
- 28 years - 14 or 15 terms
- 30 years - 15 or 16 terms
- 32 years - 16 or 17 terms
- 34 years - 17 or 18 terms
- 36 years - 18 or 19 terms
- 38 years - 19 or 20 terms
- 40 years - 20 or 21 terms
- 42 years - 21 or 22 terms
- 44 years - 22 or 23 terms
- 46 years - 23 or 24 terms
- 48 years - 24 or 25 terms
- 50 years - 25 or 26 terms
- 52 years - 26 or 27 terms
- 54 years - 27 or 28 terms
- 56 years - 28 or 29 terms
- 58 years - 29 or 30 terms

Name	Term	State/ Territory	Party	Lifespan
Clinton Babbitt	1891–1893	Wisconsin	Democratic	1831–1907
Elijah Babbitt	1859–1863	Pennsylvania	Republican	1795–1887
Alfred Babcock	1841–1843	New York	Whig	1805–1871
Joseph W. Babcock	1893–1907	Wisconsin	Republican	1850–1909
Leander Babcock	1851–1853	New York	Democratic	1811–1864
William Babcock	1831–1833	New York	Anti-Masonic	1785–1838
John J. Babka	1919–1921	Ohio	Democratic	1884–1937
Joe Baca	1999–2013	California	Democratic	1947–present
Jim Bacchus	1991–1995	Florida	Democratic	1949–present
Isaac Bacharach	1915–1937	New Jersey	Republican	1870–1956
Reuben K. Bachman	1879–1881	Pennsylvania	Democratic	1834–1911
Carl G. Bachmann	1925–1933	West Virginia	Republican	1890–1980
Michele Bachmann	2007–2015	Minnesota	Republican	1956–present
Spencer Bachus	1993–2015	Alabama	Republican	1947–present
Ezekiel Bacon	1807–1813	Massachusetts	Democratic-Republican	1776–1870
Henry Bacon	1886–1889; 1891–1893	New York	Democratic	1846–1915
John Bacon	1801–1803	Massachusetts	Democratic-Republican	1738–1820
Mark R. Bacon	1917	Michigan	Republican	1852–1941
Robert L. Bacon	1923–1938	New York	Republican	1884–1938
William J. Bacon	1877–1879	New York	Republican	1803–1889
De Witt C. Badger	1903–1905	Ohio	Democratic	1858–1926
Luther Badger	1825–1827	New York	National Republican	1785–1868
Robert Badham	1977–1989	California	Republican	1929–2005
Herman Badillo	1971–1977	New York	Democratic	1929–2014
George Baer Jr.	1797–1801; 1815–1817	Maryland	Federalist	1763–1834
John M. Baer	1917–1921	North Dakota	Republican	1886–1970
Scotty Baesler	1993–1999	Kentucky	Democratic	1941–present
Skip Bafalis	1973–1983	Florida	Republican	1929–2023
John C. Bagby	1875–1877	Illinois	Democratic	1819–1896
George A. Bagley	1875–1879	New York	Republican	1826–1915
John H. Bagley Jr.	1875–1877; 1883–1885	New York	Democratic	1832–1902
Alexander H. Bailey	1867–1871	New York	Republican	1817–1874
Cleveland M. Bailey	1945–1947; 1949–1963	West Virginia	Democratic	1886–1965
Jack Bailey	1851–1853	Georgia	States Rights	1812–1897
Jack Bailey	1853–1855	Georgia	Democratic	1812–1897
Donald A. Bailey	1979–1983	Pennsylvania	Democratic	1945–2020
Goldsmith Bailey	1861–1862	Massachusetts	Republican	1823–1862
Jeremiah Bailey	1835–1837	Maine	National Republican	1773–1853
John Bailey	1824–1825	Massachusetts	Democratic-Republican	1786–1835
John Bailey	1825–1831	Massachusetts	National Republican	1786–1835
John Mosher Bailey	1878–1881	New York	Republican	1838–1916
Joseph Bailey	1861–1865	Pennsylvania	Democratic	1810–1885
Joseph W. Bailey	1891–1901	Texas	Democratic	1862–1929
Joseph Weldon Bailey Jr.	1933–1935	Texas	Democratic	1892–1943
Ralph E. Bailey	1925–1927	Missouri	Republican	1878–1948
Theodorus Bailey	1793–1795	New York	Anti-Administration	1758–1828
Theodorus Bailey	1795–1797; 1799–1801; 1801–1803	New York	Democratic-Republican	1758–1828
Warren W. Bailey	1913–1917	Pennsylvania	Democratic	1855–1928
Wendell Bailey	1981–1983	Missouri	Republican	1940–present
Willis J. Bailey	1899–1901	Kansas	Republican	1854–1932
Brian Baird	1999–2011	Washington	Democratic	1956–present
Joseph E. Baird	1929–1931	Ohio	Republican	1865–1942
Samuel T. Baird	1897–1899	Louisiana	Democratic	1861–1899
Caleb Baker	1819–1821	New York	Democratic-Republican	1762–1849
Charles S. Baker	1885–1891	New York	Republican	1839–1902
Edward D. Baker	1845–1847; 1849–1851	Illinois	Whig	1811–1861
Ezra Baker	1815–1817	New Jersey	Democratic-Republican	c. 1765 – after 1818
Henry M. Baker	1893–1897	New Hampshire	Republican	1841–1912
Howard Baker Sr.	1951–1964	Tennessee	Republican	1902–1964
Irene Baker	1964–1965	Tennessee	Republican	1901–1994
J. Thompson Baker	1913–1915	New Jersey	Democratic	1847–1919
Jehu Baker	1865–1869; 1887–1889	Illinois	Republican	1822–1903
Jehu Baker	1897–1899	Illinois	Democratic	1822–1903
John Baker	1811–1813	Virginia	Federalist	1769–1823
John Baker	1875–1881	Indiana	Republican	1832–1915
LaMar Baker	1971–1975	Tennessee	Republican	1915–2003
Osmyn Baker	1840–1845	Massachusetts	Whig	1800–1875
Richard Baker	1987–2008	Louisiana	Republican	1948–present
Robert Baker	1903–1905	New York	Democratic	1862–1943
Stephen Baker	1861–1863	New York	Republican	1819–1875
William Baker	1891–1897	Kansas	Populist	1831–1910
William Benjamin Baker	1895–1901	Maryland	Republican	1840–1911
William H. Baker	1875–1879	New York	Republican	1827–1911
Bill Baker	1993–1997	California	Republican	1940–present
Charles M. Bakewell	1933–1935	Connecticut	Republican	1867–1957
Claude I. Bakewell	1947–1949; 1951–1953	Missouri	Republican	1912–1987
John Baldacci	1995–2003	Maine	Democratic	1955–present
Howard M. Baldrige	1931–1933	Nebraska	Republican	1894–1985
Alvin Baldus	1975–1981	Wisconsin	Democratic	1926–2017
Abraham Baldwin	1789–1795	Georgia	Anti-Administration	1754–1807
Abraham Baldwin	1795–1799	Georgia	Democratic-Republican	1754–1807
Augustus C. Baldwin	1863–1865	Michigan	Democratic	1817–1903
Harry Streett Baldwin	1943–1947	Maryland	Democratic	1894–1952
Henry Baldwin	1817–1822	Pennsylvania	Democratic-Republican	1780–1844
Henry Alexander Baldwin	1922–1923	Hawaii	Republican	1871–1946
John Baldwin	1825–1829	Connecticut	National Republican	1772–1850
John D. Baldwin	1863–1869	Massachusetts	Republican	1809–1883
John F. Baldwin Jr.	1955–1966	California	Republican	1915–1966
Joseph C. Baldwin	1941–1947	New York	Republican	1897–1957
Melvin Baldwin	1893–1895	Minnesota	Democratic	1838–1901
Simeon Baldwin	1803–1805	Connecticut	Federalist	1761–1851
Tammy Baldwin	1999–2013	Wisconsin	Democratic	1962–present
Edward Ball	1853–1857	Ohio	Independent Democrat	1811–1872
L. Heisler Ball	1901–1903	Delaware	Republican	1861–1932
Thomas H. Ball	1897–1903	Texas	Democratic	1859–1944
Thomas R. Ball	1939–1941	Connecticut	Republican	1896–1943
William Lee Ball	1817–1824	Virginia	Democratic-Republican	1781–1824
Frank Ballance	2003–2004	North Carolina	Democratic	1942–2019
Cass Ballenger	1986–2005	North Carolina	Republican	1926–2015
John Goff Ballentine	1883–1887	Tennessee	Democratic	1825–1915
Latimer W. Ballou	1875–1881	Rhode Island	Republican	1812–1900
William N. Baltz	1913–1915	Illinois	Democratic	1860–1943
Bert Bandstra	1965–1967	Iowa	Democratic	1922–1995
John H. Bankhead	1887–1907	Alabama	Democratic	1842–1920
Walter W. Bankhead	1941	Alabama	Democratic	1897–1988
William B. Bankhead	1917–1940	Alabama	Democratic	1874–1940
Jim Banks	2017–2025	Indiana	Republican	1979–present
John Banks	1831–1836	Pennsylvania	Anti-Masonic	1793–1864
Linn Banks	1838–1841	Virginia	Democratic	1784–1842
Nathaniel P. Banks	1853–1855	Massachusetts	Democratic	1816–1894
Nathaniel P. Banks	1855–1857	Massachusetts	American	1816–1894
Nathaniel P. Banks	1857; 1865–1873	Massachusetts	Republican	1816–1894
Nathaniel P. Banks	1875–1877	Massachusetts	Independent	1816–1894
Nathaniel P. Banks	1877–1879; 1889–1891	Massachusetts	Republican	1816–1894
Henry B. Banning	1873–1879	Ohio	Democratic	1836–1881
Henry T. Bannon	1905–1909	Ohio	Republican	1867–1950
Parke M. Banta	1947–1949	Missouri	Republican	1891–1970
Hiram Barber Jr.	1879–1881	Illinois	Republican	1835–1924
Isaac A. Barber	1897–1899	Maryland	Republican	1852–1909
J. Allen Barber	1871–1875	Wisconsin	Republican	1809–1881
Laird Howard Barber	1899–1901	Pennsylvania	Democratic	1848–1928
Levi Barber	1817–1819; 1821–1823	Ohio	National Republican	1777–1833
Noyes Barber	1821–1825	Connecticut	Democratic-Republican	1781–1844
Noyes Barber	1825–1835	Connecticut	National Republican	1781–1844
Ron Barber	2012–2015	Arizona	Democratic	1945–present
Henry E. Barbour	1919–1933	California	Republican	1877–1945
John S. Barbour	1823–1825	Virginia	Democratic-Republican	1790–1855
John S. Barbour	1825–1833	Virginia	Democratic	1790–1855
John S. Barbour Jr.	1881–1887	Virginia	Democratic	1820–1892
Lucien Barbour	1855–1857	Indiana	Oppositionist	1811–1880
Philip P. Barbour	1814–1825	Virginia	Democratic-Republican	1783–1841
Philip P. Barbour	1827–1830	Virginia	Democratic	1783–1841
Peter W. Barca	1993–1995	Wisconsin	Democratic	1955–present
Andrew J. Barchfeld	1905–1917	Pennsylvania	Republican	1863–1922
James Barcia	1993–2003	Michigan	Democratic	1952–present
Charles Frederick Barclay	1907–1911	Pennsylvania	Republican	1844–1914
David Barclay	1855–1857	Pennsylvania	Democratic	1823–1889
David Bard	1803–1813	Pennsylvania	Democratic-Republican	1744–1815
Graham A. Barden	1935–1961	North Carolina	Democratic	1896–1967
John All Barham	1895–1901	California	Republican	1843–1926
Walter S. Baring Jr.	1949–1953; 1957–1973	Nevada	Democratic	1911–1975
Abraham Andrews Barker	1865–1867	Pennsylvania	Republican	1816–1898
David Barker Jr.	1827–1829	New Hampshire	National Republican	1797–1834
Joseph Barker	1805–1809	Massachusetts	Democratic-Republican	1751–1815
Alben W. Barkley	1913–1927	Kentucky	Democratic	1877–1956
Ethelbert Barksdale	1883–1887	Mississippi	Democratic	1824–1893
William Barksdale	1853–1861	Mississippi	Democratic	1821–1863
Lou Barletta	2011–2019	Pennsylvania	Republican	1956–present
Bradley Barlow	1879–1881	Vermont	Greenbacker	1814–1889
Charles A. Barlow	1897–1899	California	Populist	1858–1927
Stephen Barlow	1827–1829	Pennsylvania	Democratic	1779–1845
Thomas Barlow	1993–1995	Kentucky	Democratic	1940–2017
Daniel D. Barnard	1827–1829; 1839–1845	New York	Whig	1797–1861
Doug Barnard Jr.	1977–1993	Georgia	Democratic	1922–2018
William O. Barnard	1909–1911	Indiana	Republican	1852–1939
Demas Barnes	1867–1869	New York	Democratic	1827–1888
George Barnes	1885–1891	Georgia	Democratic	1833–1901
James M. Barnes	1939–1943	Illinois	Democratic	1899–1958
Lyman E. Barnes	1893–1895	Wisconsin	Democratic	1855–1904
Michael D. Barnes	1979–1987	Maryland	Democratic	1943–present
William Barnett	1812–1815	Georgia	Democratic-Republican	1761–1832
John Barney	1825–1829	Maryland	National Republican	1785–1857
Samuel S. Barney	1895–1903	Wisconsin	Republican	1846–1919
Henry A. Barnhart	1908–1919	Indiana	Democratic	1858–1934
Charles Augustus Barnitz	1833–1835	Pennsylvania	Anti-Masonic	1780–1850
William Barnum	1867–1876	Connecticut	Democratic	1818–1889
Robert Barnwell	1791–1793	South Carolina	Pro-Administration	1761–1814
Robert Woodward Barnwell	1829–1831	South Carolina	Democratic	1801–1882
Robert Woodward Barnwell	1831–1833	South Carolina	Nullifier	1801–1882
Bob Barr	1995–2003	Georgia	Republican	1948–present
Joseph W. Barr	1959–1961	Indiana	Democratic	1918–1996
Samuel Fleming Barr	1881–1885	Pennsylvania	Republican	1829–1919
Thomas J. Barr	1859–1861	New York	Democratic	1812–1881
Granville Barrere	1873–1875	Illinois	Republican	1829–1889
Nelson Barrere	1851–1853	Ohio	Whig	1808–1883
John R. Barret	1859–1860; 1860–1861	Missouri	Democratic	1825–1903
Bill Barrett	1991–2001	Nebraska	Republican	1929–2016
Frank A. Barrett	1943–1950	Wyoming	Republican	1892–1962
Gresham Barrett	2003–2011	South Carolina	Republican	1961–present
Tom Barrett	1993–2003	Wisconsin	Democratic	1953–present
William A. Barrett	1945–1947; 1949–1976	Pennsylvania	Democratic	1896–1976
William Emerson Barrett	1895–1899	Massachusetts	Republican	1858–1906
Daniel Laurens Barringer	1826–1833	North Carolina	Democratic	1788–1852
Daniel Laurens Barringer	1833–1835	North Carolina	National Republican	1788–1852
Daniel Moreau Barringer	1843–1849	North Carolina	Whig	1806–1873
John Barrow	2005–2015	Georgia	Democratic	1955–present
Washington Barrow	1847–1849	Tennessee	Whig	1807–1866
Samuel J. Barrows	1897–1899	Massachusetts	Republican	1845–1909
Frederick G. Barry	1885–1889	Mississippi	Democratic	1845–1909
Henry W. Barry	1870–1875	Mississippi	Republican	1840–1875
Robert R. Barry	1959–1965	New York	Republican	1915–1988
William B. Barry	1935–1946	New York	Democratic	1902–1946
William T. Barry	1810–1811	Kentucky	Democratic-Republican	1784–1835
William S. Barry	1853–1855	Mississippi	Democratic	1821–1868
Gamaliel H. Barstow	1831–1833	New York	Anti-Masonic	1784–1865
Gideon Barstow	1821–1823	Massachusetts	Democratic-Republican	1783–1852
Richard Bartholdt	1893–1915	Missouri	Republican	1855–1932
Horace F. Bartine	1889–1893	Nevada	Republican	1848–1918
Bailey Bartlett	1797–1801	Massachusetts	Federalist	1750–1830
Bob Bartlett	1945–1959	Alaska	Democratic	1904–1968
Charles L. Bartlett	1895–1915	Georgia	Democratic	1853–1938
Franklin Bartlett	1893–1897	New York	Democratic	1847–1909
George A. Bartlett	1907–1911	Nevada	Democratic	1869–1951
Ichabod Bartlett	1823–1825	New Hampshire	Democratic-Republican	1786–1853
Ichabod Bartlett	1825–1829	New Hampshire	National Republican	1786–1853
Josiah Bartlett Jr.	1811–1813	New Hampshire	Democratic-Republican	1768–1838
Roscoe Bartlett	1993–2013	Maryland	Republican	1926–present
Steve Bartlett	1983–1991	Texas	Republican	1947–present
Thomas Bartlett Jr.	1851–1853	Vermont	Democratic	1808–1876
Mordecai Bartley	1823–1831	Ohio	National Republican	1783–1870
Bruce Barton	1937–1941	New York	Republican	1886–1967
Joe Barton	1985–2019	Texas	Republican	1949–present
Richard W. Barton	1841–1843	Virginia	Whig	1800–1859
Samuel Barton	1835–1837	New York	Democratic	1785–1858
Silas Reynolds Barton	1913–1915	Nebraska	Republican	1872–1916
William E. Barton	1931–1933	Missouri	Democratic	1868–1955
Charles Barwig	1889–1895	Wisconsin	Democratic	1837–1912
Coles Bashford	1867–1869	Arizona	Republican	1816–1878
Charles Bass	1995–2007; 2011–2013	New Hampshire	Republican	1952–present
Karen Bass	2011–2022	California	Democratic	1953–present
Lyman K. Bass	1873–1877	New York	Republican	1836–1889
Perkins Bass	1955–1963	New Hampshire	Republican	1912–2011
Ross Bass	1955–1964	Tennessee	Democratic	1918–1993
Burwell Bassett	1805–1813; 1815–1819; 1821–1825	Virginia	Democratic-Republican	1764–1841
Burwell Bassett	1825–1829	Virginia	Democratic	1764–1841
Edward Bassett	1903–1905	New York	Democratic	1863–1948
Ephraim Bateman	1815–1823	New Jersey	Democratic-Republican	1780–1829
Herb Bateman	1983–2000	Virginia	Republican	1928–2000
Arthur L. Bates	1901–1913	Pennsylvania	Republican	1859–1934
Edward Bates	1827–1829	Missouri	National Republican	1793–1869
George J. Bates	1937–1949	Massachusetts	Republican	1891–1949
Isaac C. Bates	1827–1835	Massachusetts	National Republican	1779–1845
James Bates	1831–1833	Maine	Democratic	1789–1882
James Woodson Bates	1819–1823	Arkansas	None	1788–1846
Jim Bates	1983–1991	California	Democratic	1941–present
Joe B. Bates	1938–1953	Kentucky	Democratic	1893–1965
William H. Bates	1950–1969	Massachusetts	Republican	1917–1969
Ellsworth Raymond Bathrick	1911–1915; 1917	Ohio	Democratic	1863–1917
James F. Battin	1961–1969	Montana	Republican	1925–1996
Laurie C. Battle	1947–1955	Alabama	Democratic	1912–2000
Max Baucus	1975–1978	Montana	Democratic	1941–present
Robert Bauman	1973–1981	Maryland	Republican	1937–present
Albert David Baumhart Jr.	1941–1942; 1955–1961	Ohio	Republican	1908–2001
Portus Baxter	1861–1867	Vermont	Republican	1806–1868
William V. Bay	1849–1851	Missouri	Democratic	1818–1894
James A. Bayard	1797–1803	Delaware	Federalist	1767–1815
Francis Baylies	1821–1825	Massachusetts	Federalist	1783–1852
Francis Baylies	1825–1827	Massachusetts	Democratic	1783–1852
William Baylies	1809–1809	Massachusetts	Federalist	1776–1865
William Baylies	1813–1817	Massachusetts	Federalist	1776–1865
William Baylies	1833–1835	Massachusetts	National Republican	1776–1865
R. E. B. Baylor	1829–1831	Alabama	Democratic	1793–1874
Thomas Bayly	1817–1823	Maryland	Federalist	1775–1829
Thomas H. Bayly	1844–1856	Virginia	Democratic	1810–1856
Thomas Monteagle Bayly	1813–1815	Virginia	Federalist	1775–1834
Thomas M. Bayne	1877–1891	Pennsylvania	Republican	1836–1894
Clifton B. Beach	1895–1899	Ohio	Republican	1845–1902
Lewis Beach	1881–1886	New York	Democratic	1835–1886
Samuel Beakes	1913–1917; 1917–1919	Michigan	Democratic	1861–1927
Charles Lewis Beale	1859–1861	New York	Republican	1824–1899
James M. H. Beale	1833–1837; 1849–1853	Virginia	Democratic	1786–1866
Joseph Grant Beale	1907–1909	Pennsylvania	Republican	1839–1915
Richard L. T. Beale	1847–1849; 1879–1881	Virginia	Democratic	1819–1893
C. William Beales	1915–1917	Pennsylvania	Republican	1877–1927
J. Glenn Beall	1943–1953	Maryland	Republican	1894–1971
J. Glenn Beall Jr.	1969–1971	Maryland	Republican	1927–2006
James Andrew Beall	1903–1915	Texas	Democratic	1866–1929
Reasin Beall	1813–1814	Ohio	Democratic-Republican	1769–1843
Harry P. Beam	1931–1942	Illinois	Democratic	1892–1967
Fernando C. Beaman	1861–1871	Michigan	Republican	1814–1882
John V. Beamer	1951–1959	Indiana	Republican	1896–1964
Benning M. Bean	1833–1837	New Hampshire	Democratic	1782–1866
Curtis Coe Bean	1885–1887	Arizona	Republican	1828–1904
Melissa Bean	2005–2011	Illinois	Democratic	1962–present
Edward Beard	1975–1981	Rhode Island	Democratic	1940–2021
Robin Beard	1973–1983	Tennessee	Republican	1939–2007
Samuel Beardsley	1831–1836; 1843–1844	New York	Democratic	1790–1860
John Beatty	1793–1795	New Jersey	Pro-Administration	1749–1826
John Beatty	1868–1873	Ohio	Republican	1828–1914
William Beatty	1837–1841	Pennsylvania	Democratic	1787–1851
Martin Beaty	1833–1835	Kentucky	National Republican	1784–1856
Andrew Beaumont	1833–1837	Pennsylvania	Democratic	1790–1853
Bob Beauprez	2003–2007	Colorado	Republican	1948–present
Xavier Becerra	1993–2017	California	Democratic	1958–present
Erasmus W. Beck	1872–1873	Georgia	Democratic	1833–1898
James B. Beck	1867–1875	Kentucky	Democratic	1822–1890
James M. Beck	1927–1934	Pennsylvania	Republican	1861–1936
Joseph D. Beck	1921–1929	Wisconsin	Republican	1866–1936
Frank J. Becker	1953–1965	New York	Republican	1899–1981
William M. Beckner	1894–1895	Kentucky	Democratic	1841–1910
Charles D. Beckwith	1889–1891	New Jersey	Republican	1838–1921
Lindley Beckworth	1939–1953; 1957–1967	Texas	Democratic	1913–1984
James Bede	1903–1909	Minnesota	Republican	1856–1942
Berkley Bedell	1975–1987	Iowa	Democratic	1921–2019
George M. Bedinger	1803–1807	Kentucky	Democratic-Republican	1756–1843
Henry Bedinger	1845–1849	Virginia	Democratic	1812–1858
Carlos Bee	1919–1921	Texas	Democratic	1867–1932
George M. Beebe	1875–1879	New York	Democratic	1836–1927
Philemon Beecher	1817–1821	Ohio	Federalist	1776–1839
Philemon Beecher	1823–1829	Ohio	National Republican	1776–1839
Carroll L. Beedy	1921–1935	Maine	Republican	1880–1947
Thomas Beekman	1829–1831	New York	National Republican	1790–1870
Joseph H. Beeman	1891–1893	Mississippi	Democratic	1833–1909
Ralph F. Beermann	1961–1965	Nebraska	Republican	1912–1977
Cyrus Beers	1838–1839	New York	Democratic	1786–1850
Edward M. Beers	1923–1932	Pennsylvania	Republican	1877–1932
Henry White Beeson	1841–1843	Pennsylvania	Democratic	1791–1863
James T. Begg	1919–1929	Ohio	Republican	1877–1963
Nick Begich	1971–1972	Alaska	Democratic	1932–1972
Josiah Begole	1873–1875	Michigan	Republican	1815–1896
Jacob A. Beidler	1901–1907	Ohio	Republican	1852–1912
Anthony Beilenson	1977–1997	California	Democratic	1932–2017
Andrew Beirne	1837–1841	Virginia	Democratic	1771–1845
Alfred F. Beiter	1933–1939; 1941–1943	New York	Democratic	1894–1974
Hiram Belcher	1847–1849	Maine	Whig	1790–1857
Nathan Belcher	1853–1855	Connecticut	Democratic	1813–1891
Page Belcher	1951–1973	Oklahoma	Republican	1899–1980
George O. Belden	1827–1829	New York	Democratic	1797–1833
James J. Belden	1887–1895; 1897–1899	New York	Republican	1825–1904
James B. Belford	1876–1877; 1879–1885	Colorado	Republican	1837–1910
Joseph M. Belford	1897–1899	New York	Republican	1852–1917
Charles E. Belknap	1889–1891; 1891–1893	Michigan	Republican	1846–1929
Hugh R. Belknap	1895–1899	Illinois	Republican	1860–1901
Alphonzo E. Bell Jr.	1961–1977	California	Republican	1914–2004
C. Jasper Bell	1935–1949	Missouri	Democratic	1885–1978
Charles K. Bell	1893–1897	Texas	Democratic	1853–1913
Charles W. Bell	1913–1915	California	Progressive Republican	1857–1927
Chris Bell	2003–2005	Texas	Democratic	1959–present
Hiram Bell	1851–1853	Ohio	Whig	1808–1855
Hiram Parks Bell	1873–1875; 1877–1879	Georgia	Democratic	1827–1907
James Martin Bell	1833–1835	Ohio	Democratic	1796–1849
John Bell	1827–1835	Tennessee	Democratic	1796–1869
John Bell	1835–1837	Tennessee	National Republican	1796–1869
John Bell	1837–1841	Tennessee	Whig	1796–1869
John Bell	1851	Ohio	Whig	1796–1869
John Calhoun Bell	1893–1903	Colorado	Populist	1851–1933
John J. Bell	1955–1957	Texas	Democratic	1910–1963
Joshua Fry Bell	1845–1847	Kentucky	Whig	1811–1870
Peter Hansborough Bell	1853–1857	Texas	Democratic	1810/2–1898
Samuel Newell Bell	1871–1873; 1875–1877	New Hampshire	Democratic	1829–1889
Theodore Arlington Bell	1903–1905	California	Democratic	1872–1922
Thomas M. Bell	1905–1931	Georgia	Democratic	1861–1941
John D. Bellamy	1899–1903	North Carolina	Democratic	1854–1942
Joseph Bellinger	1817–1819	South Carolina	Democratic-Republican	1773–1830
Oliver Belmont	1901–1903	New York	Democratic	1858–1908
Perry Belmont	1881–1889	New York	Democratic	1851–1947
James E. Belser	1843–1845	Alabama	Democratic	1805–1859
Frank E. Beltzhoover	1879–1883; 1891–1895	Pennsylvania	Democratic	1841–1923
George H. Bender	1939–1949; 1951–1954	Ohio	Republican	1896–1961
Charles B. Benedict	1877–1879	New York	Democratic	1828–1901
Cleve Benedict	1981–1983	West Virginia	Republican	1935–present
Henry S. Benedict	1916–1917	California	Republican	1878–1930
John S. Benham	1919–1923	Indiana	Republican	1863–1935
Dan Benishek	2011–2017	Michigan	Republican	1952–2021
Jaime Benítez Rexach	1973–1977	Puerto Rico	Popular Democratic	1908–2001
Adam Benjamin Jr.	1977–1982	Indiana	Democratic	1935–1982
John F. Benjamin	1865–1871	Missouri	Republican	1817–1877
George J. Benner	1897–1899	Pennsylvania	Democratic	1859–1930
Augustus W. Bennet	1945–1947	New York	Republican	1897–1983
Benjamin Bennet	1815–1819	New Jersey	Democratic-Republican	1764–1840
Hiram Pitt Bennet	1861–1865	Colorado	Republican	1826–1914
William Stiles Bennet	1905–1911; 1915–1917	New York	Republican	1870–1962
Charles E. Bennett	1949–1993	Florida	Democratic	1910–2003
Charles G. Bennett	1895–1899	New York	Republican	1863–1914
David S. Bennett	1869–1871	New York	Republican	1811–1894
Granville G. Bennett	1879–1881	Dakota	Republican	1833–1910
Hendley S. Bennett	1855–1857	Mississippi	Democratic	1807–1891
Henry Bennett	1849–1855	New York	Whig	1808–1868
Henry Bennett	1855–1857	New York	Oppositionist	1808–1868
Henry Bennett	1857–1859	New York	Republican	1808–1868
John B. Bennett	1943–1945; 1947–1964	Michigan	Republican	1904–1964
Joseph B. Bennett	1905–1911	Kentucky	Republican	1859–1923
Marion T. Bennett	1943–1949	Missouri	Republican	1914–2000
Philip A. Bennett	1941–1942	Missouri	Republican	1881–1942
Risden Tyler Bennett	1883–1887	North Carolina	Democratic	1840–1913
Thomas W. Bennett	1875–1876	Idaho	Independent	1831–1893
Allan Benny	1903–1905	New Jersey	Democratic	1867–1942
Carville Benson	1918–1921	Maryland	Democratic	1872–1929
Egbert Benson	1789–1793; 1813	New York	Federalist	1746–1833
Samuel P. Benson	1853–1855	Maine	Whig	1804–1876
Samuel P. Benson	1855–1857	Maine	Oppositionist	1804–1876
Kerry Bentivolio	2013–2015	Michigan	Republican	1951–present
Alvin Morell Bentley	1953–1961	Michigan	Republican	1918–1969
Helen Delich Bentley	1985–1995	Maryland	Republican	1923–2016
Henry Wilbur Bentley	1891–1893	New York	Democratic	1838–1907
Charles S. Benton	1843–1847	New York	Democratic	1810–1882
Jacob Benton	1867–1871	New Hampshire	Republican	1814–1892
Lemuel Benton	1793–1795	South Carolina	Anti-Administration	1754–1818
Lemuel Benton	1795–1799	South Carolina	Democratic-Republican	1754–1818
Maecenas E. Benton	1897–1905	Missouri	Democratic	1848–1924
Thomas Hart Benton	1853–1855	Missouri	Democratic	1782–1858
Ken Bentsen	1995–2003	Texas	Democratic	1959–present
Lloyd Bentsen	1948–1955	Texas	Democratic	1921–2006
Doug Bereuter	1979–2004	Nebraska	Republican	1939–present
Rick Berg	2011–2013	North Dakota	Republican	1959–present
Christopher A. Bergen	1889–1893	New Jersey	Republican	1841–1905
John T. Bergen	1831–1833	New York	Democratic	1786–1855
Teunis G. Bergen	1865–1867	New York	Democratic	1806–1881
Victor L. Berger	1911–1913; 1923–1929	Wisconsin	Socialist	1860–1929
Robert Bergland	1971–1977	Minnesota	Democratic-Farmer-Labor	1928–2018
Shelley Berkley	1999–2013	Nevada	Democratic	1951–present
William M. Berlin	1933–1937	Pennsylvania	Democratic	1880–1962
Howard Berman	1983–2013	California	Democratic	1941–present
John Bernard	1937–1939	Minnesota	Farmer-Labor	1893–1983
John Milton Bernhisel	1851–1859; 1861–1863	Utah	None	1799–1881
Albert S. Berry	1893–1901	Kentucky	Democratic	1836–1908
Campbell Polson Berry	1879–1883	California	Democratic	1834–1901
E. Y. Berry	1951–1971	South Dakota	Republican	1902–1999
John Berry	1873–1875	Ohio	Democratic	1833–1879
Marion Berry	1997–2011	Arkansas	Democratic	1942–2023
Earl Hanley Beshlin	1917–1919	Pennsylvania	Democratic	1870–1971
Ed Bethune	1979–1985	Arkansas	Republican	1935–present
Lauchlin Bethune	1831–1833	North Carolina	Democratic	1785–1874
Marion Bethune	1870–1871	Georgia	Republican	1816–1895
Silas Betton	1803–1807	New Hampshire	Federalist	1768–1822
Jackson Edward Betts	1951–1973	Ohio	Republican	1904–1993
Samuel Betts	1815–1817	New York	Democratic–Republican	1786–1868
John Lourie Beveridge	1871–1873	Illinois	Republican	1824–1910
Tom Bevill	1967–1997	Alabama	Democratic	1921–2005
Mario Biaggi	1969–1988	New York	Democratic	1917–2015
William W. Bibb	1807–1813	Georgia	Democratic-Republican	1781–1820
Thomas Marshal Bibighaus	1851–1853	Pennsylvania	Whig	1817–1853
Bennet Bicknell	1837–1839	New York	Democratic	1781–1841
George A. Bicknell	1877–1881	Indiana	Democratic	1815–1891
Charles John Biddle	1861–1863	Pennsylvania	Democratic	1819–1873
John Biddle	1829–1831	Michigan	None	1792–1859
Joseph Franklin Biddle	1932–1933	Pennsylvania	Republican	1871–1936
Richard Biddle	1837–1840	Pennsylvania	Anti-Masonic	1796–1847
Benjamin A. Bidlack	1841–1845	Pennsylvania	Democratic	1804–1849
Barnabas Bidwell	1805–1807	Massachusetts	Democratic-Republican	1763–1833
John Bidwell	1865–1867	California	Republican	1819–1900
Andrew Biemiller	1945–1947; 1949–1951	Wisconsin	Democratic	1906–1982
Fred Biermann	1933–1939	Iowa	Democratic	1884–1968
James S. Biery	1873–1875	Pennsylvania	Republican	1839–1904
Edward G. Biester Jr.	1967–1977	Pennsylvania	Republican	1931–present
John S. Bigby	1871–1873	Georgia	Republican	1832–1898
Abijah Bigelow	1810–1815	Massachusetts	Federalist	1775–1860
Herbert S. Bigelow	1937–1939	Ohio	Democratic	1870–1951
Lewis Bigelow	1821–1823	Massachusetts	Federalist	1785–1838
Judy Biggert	1999–2013	Illinois	Republican	1937–present
Asa Biggs	1845–1847	North Carolina	Democratic	1811–1878
Benjamin T. Biggs	1869–1873	Delaware	Democratic	1821–1893
Marion Biggs	1887–1891	California	Democratic	1823–1910
Brian Bilbray	1995–2001; 2006–2013	California	Republican	1951–present
James Bilbray	1987–1995	Nevada	Democratic	1938–2021
Michael Bilirakis	1983–2007	Florida	Republican	1930–present
Charles Billinghurst	1855–1857	Wisconsin	Oppositionist	1818–1865
Charles Billinghurst	1857–1859	Wisconsin	Republican	1818–1865
Alexander Billmeyer	1902–1903	Pennsylvania	Democratic	1841–1924
Charles Binderup	1935–1939	Nebraska	Democratic	1873–1950
Thomas Bines	1814–1815	New Jersey	Democratic-Republican	died 1826
Henry H. Bingham	1879–1912	Pennsylvania	Republican	1841–1912
John Bingham	1855–1863; 1865–1873	Ohio	Republican	1815–1900
Jonathan B. Bingham	1965–1983	New York	Democratic	1914–1986
Kinsley S. Bingham	1847–1851	Michigan	Democratic	1808–1861
Horace Binney	1833–1835	Pennsylvania	National Republican	1780–1875
William F. Birch	1918–1919	New Jersey	Republican	1870–1946
John Bird	1799–1801	New York	Federalist	1768–1806
John T. Bird	1869–1873	New Jersey	Democratic	1829–1911
Richard Ely Bird	1921–1923	Kansas	Republican	1878–1955
Ausburn Birdsall	1847–1849	New York	Democratic	1814–1903
Benjamin P. Birdsall	1903–1909	Iowa	Republican	1858–1917
James Birdsall	1815–1817	New York	Democratic–Republican	1783–1856
Samuel Birdsall	1837–1839	New York	Democratic	1791–1872
Victory Birdseye	1815–1817	New York	Democratic–Republican	1782–1853
Victory Birdseye	1841–1843	New York	Whig	1782–1853
Horatio Bisbee Jr.	1877–1879; 1881; 1882–1885	Florida	Republican	1839–1916
C. W. Bishop	1941–1955	Illinois	Republican	1890–1971
Dan Bishop	2019–2025	North Carolina	Republican	1964–present
James Bishop	1855–1857	New Jersey	Oppositionist	1816–1895
Mike Bishop	2015–2019	Michigan	Republican	1967–present
Phanuel Bishop	1799–1807	Massachusetts	Democratic-Republican	1739–1812
Rob Bishop	2003–2021	Utah	Republican	1951–present
Roswell P. Bishop	1895–1907	Michigan	Republican	1843–1920
Tim Bishop	2003–2015	New York	Democratic	1950–present
William D. Bishop	1857–1859	Connecticut	Democratic	1827–1904
William Henry Bissell	1849–1853	Illinois	Democratic	1811–1860
William Henry Bissell	1853–1855	Illinois	Independent Democrat	1811–1860
Harris J. Bixler	1921–1927	Pennsylvania	Republican	1870–1941
Diane Black	2011–2019	Tennessee	Republican	1951–present
Edward J. Black	1839–1841	Georgia	Whig	1806–1846
Edward J. Black	1842–1845	Georgia	Democratic	1806–1846
Eugene Black	1915–1929	Texas	Democratic	1879–1975
Frank S. Black	1895–1897	New York	Republican	1853–1913
George Robison Black	1881–1883	Georgia	Democratic	1835–1886
Henry Black	1841	Pennsylvania	Whig	1783–1841
James Black	1836–1837; 1843–1847	Pennsylvania	Democratic	1793–1872
James A. Black	1843–1848	South Carolina	Democratic	1793–1848
James C. C. Black	1893–1895; 1895–1897	Georgia	Democratic	1842–1928
John C. Black	1893–1895	Illinois	Democratic	1839–1915
Loring M. Black Jr.	1923–1935	New York	Democratic	1886–1956
Benjamin B. Blackburn	1967–1975	Georgia	Republican	1927–2024
E. Spencer Blackburn	1901–1903; 1905–1907	North Carolina	Republican	1868–1912
J. C. S. Blackburn	1875–1885	Kentucky	Democratic	1838–1918
Marsha Blackburn	2003–2019	Tennessee	Republican	1952–present
Robert E. Lee Blackburn	1929–1931	Kentucky	Republican	1870–1935
W. Jasper Blackburn	1868–1869	Louisiana	Republican	1820–1899
William Blackledge	1803–1809; 1811–1813	North Carolina	Democratic-Republican	1767–1828
William Salter Blackledge	1821–1823	North Carolina	Democratic-Republican	1793–1856
Esbon Blackmar	1848–1849	New York	Whig	1805–1857
Fred L. Blackmon	1911–1921	Alabama	Democratic	1873–1921
William W. Blackney	1935–1937; 1939–1953	Michigan	Republican	1876–1963
Julius W. Blackwell	1839–1841; 1843–1845	Tennessee	Democratic	c. 1797 – after 1845
Lucien Blackwell	1991–1995	Pennsylvania	Democratic	1931–2003
Rod Blagojevich	1997–2003	Illinois	Democratic	1956–present
James G. Blaine	1863–1876	Maine	Republican	1830–1893
Austin Blair	1867–1873	Michigan	Republican	1818–1894
Bernard Blair	1841–1843	New York	Whig	1801–1880
Francis Preston Blair Jr.	1857–1859; 1860; 1861–1862	Missouri	Republican	1821–1875
Francis Preston Blair Jr.	1863–1864	Missouri	Unconditional Unionist	1821–1875
Henry W. Blair	1875–1879; 1893–1895	New Hampshire	Republican	1834–1920
Jacob B. Blair	1861–1863	Virginia	Unionist	1821–1901
Jacob B. Blair	1863–1865	West Virginia	Unconditional Unionist	1821–1901
James Blair	1821–1822	South Carolina	Democratic-Republican	1786–1834
James Blair	1829–1834	South Carolina	Democratic	1786–1834
James G. Blair	1871–1873	Missouri	Liberal Republican	1825–1904
John Blair	1823–1825	Tennessee	Democratic-Republican	1790–1863
John Blair	1825–1835	Tennessee	Democratic	1790–1863
Samuel Steel Blair	1859–1863	Pennsylvania	Republican	1821–1890
Daniel Blaisdell	1809–1811	New Hampshire	Federalist	1762–1833
Harrison G. O. Blake	1859–1863	Ohio	Republican	1818–1876
John Blake Jr.	1805–1809	New York	Democratic–Republican	1762–1826
John L. Blake	1879–1881	New Jersey	Republican	1831–1899
Thomas H. Blake	1827–1829	Indiana	National Republican	1792–1849
Albert Blakeney	1901–1903; 1921–1923	Maryland	Republican	1850–1924
George W. Blanchard	1933–1935	Wisconsin	Republican	1884–1964
James J. Blanchard	1975–1983	Michigan	Democratic	1942–present
John Blanchard	1845–1849	Pennsylvania	Whig	1787–1849
Newton C. Blanchard	1881–1894	Louisiana	Democratic	1849–1922
Oscar E. Bland	1917–1923	Indiana	Republican	1877–1951
Richard P. Bland	1873–1895; 1897–1899	Missouri	Democratic	1835–1899
S. Otis Bland	1918–1950	Virginia	Democratic	1872–1950
Theodorick Bland	1789–1790	Virginia	Anti-Administration	1742–1790
William T. Bland	1919–1921	Missouri	Democratic	1861–1928
Ray Blanton	1967–1973	Tennessee	Democratic	1930–1996
Thomas L. Blanton	1917–1929; 1930–1937	Texas	Democratic	1872–1957
John Blatnik	1947–1974	Minnesota	Democratic-Farmer-Labor	1911–1991
Vicente T. Blaz	1985–1993	Guam	Republican	1928–2014
Orrin Dubbs Bleakley	1917	Pennsylvania	Republican	1854–1927
Harmanus Bleecker	1811–1813	New York	Federalist	1779–1849
Thomas J. Bliley Jr.	1981–2001	Virginia	Republican	1932–2023
Aaron T. Bliss	1889–1891	Michigan	Republican	1837–1906
Archibald M. Bliss	1875–1883; 1885–1889	New York	Democratic	1838–1923
George Bliss	1853–1855; 1863–1865	Ohio	Democratic	1813–1868
Philemon Bliss	1855–1859	Ohio	Republican	1813–1889
Iris Faircloth Blitch	1955–1963	Georgia	Democratic	1912–1993
Timothy Bloodworth	1790–1791	North Carolina	Anti-Administration	1736–1814
Isaac Bloom	1803	New York	Independent	1748–1803
Sol Bloom	1923–1949	New York	Democratic	1870–1949
Joseph Bloomfield	1817–1821	New Jersey	Democratic-Republican	1753–1823
Mike Blouin	1975–1979	Iowa	Democratic	1945–present
James Henderson Blount	1873–1893	Georgia	Democratic	1837–1903
Thomas Blount	1793–1795	North Carolina	Anti-Administration	1759–1812
Thomas Blount	1795–1799; 1805–1809; 1811–1812	North Carolina	Democratic-Republican	1759–1812
William Grainger Blount	1815–1819	Tennessee	Democratic-Republican	1784–1827
Henry Taylor Blow	1863–1865	Missouri	Unconditional Unionist	1817–1875
Henry Taylor Blow	1865–1867	Missouri	Republican	1817–1875
Richard W. Blue	1895–1897	Kansas	Republican	1841–1907
Rod Blum	2015–2019	Iowa	Republican	1955–present
Earl Blumenauer	1996–2025	Oregon	Democratic	1948–present
Roy Blunt	1997–2011	Missouri	Republican	1950–present
Lisa Blunt Rochester	2017–2025	Delaware	Democratic	1962–present
Peter Blute	1993–1997	Massachusetts	Republican	1956–present
William W. Boardman	1840–1843	Connecticut	Whig	1794–1871
Alexander Boarman	1872–1873	Louisiana	Liberal Republican	1839–1916
Charles J. Boatner	1889–1896; 1896–1897	Louisiana	Democratic	1849–1903
John Boccieri	2009–2011	Ohio	Democratic	1969–present
Abraham Bockee	1829–1831; 1833–1837	New York	Democratic	1784–1865
Thomas S. Bocock	1847–1861	Virginia	Democratic	1815–1891
Andrew Boden	1817–1821	Pennsylvania	Democratic-Republican	died 1835
Robert N. Bodine	1897–1899	Missouri	Democratic	1837–1914
Charles Bodle	1833–1835	New York	Democratic	1787–1835
Sherwood Boehlert	1983–2007	New York	Republican	1936–2021
John W. Boehne	1909–1913	Indiana	Democratic	1856–1946
John W. Boehne Jr.	1931–1943	Indiana	Democratic	1895–1973
John Boehner	1991–2015	Ohio	Republican	1949–present
Haldor Boen	1893–1895	Minnesota	Populist	1851–1912
Hale Boggs	1941–1943; 1947–1973	Louisiana	Democratic	1914–1972
J. Caleb Boggs	1947–1953	Delaware	Republican	1909–1993
Lindy Boggs	1973–1991	Louisiana	Democratic	1916–2013
Frank P. Bohn	1927–1933	Michigan	Republican	1866–1944
William D. Boies	1919–1929	Iowa	Republican	1857–1932
Gerald J. Boileau	1931–1935	Wisconsin	Republican	1900–1981
Gerald J. Boileau	1935–1939	Wisconsin	Progressive	1900–1981
David A. Bokee	1849–1851	New York	Whig	1805–1860
Edward Boland	1953–1989	Massachusetts	Democratic	1911–2001
Patrick J. Boland	1931–1942	Pennsylvania	Democratic	1880–1942
Veronica Grace Boland	1942–1943	Pennsylvania	Democratic	1899–1982
Thomas Boles	1868–1871; 1872–1873	Arkansas	Republican	1837–1905
Stephen Bolles	1939–1941	Wisconsin	Republican	1866–1941
Richard W. Bolling	1949–1983	Missouri	Democratic	1916–1991
Chester C. Bolton	1929–1937; 1939	Ohio	Republican	1882–1939
Frances P. Bolton	1940–1969	Ohio	Republican	1885–1977
Oliver P. Bolton	1953–1957; 1963–1965	Ohio	Republican	1917–1972
William P. Bolton	1949–1951	Maryland	Democratic	1885–1964
Charles G. Bond	1921–1923	New York	Republican	1877–1974
Shadrach Bond	1812–1813	Illinois	Independent	1773–1832
William K. Bond	1835–1841	Ohio	Whig	1792–1864
Bill Boner	1979–1987	Tennessee	Democratic	1945–present
Milledge Luke Bonham	1857–1860	South Carolina	Democratic	1813–1890
Henry Bonilla	1993–2007	Texas	Republican	1954–present
Edward Bonin	1953–1955	Pennsylvania	Republican	1904–1990
David Bonior	1977–2003	Michigan	Democratic	1945–present
Don Bonker	1975–1989	Washington	Democratic	1937–2023
Herbert Covington Bonner	1940–1965	North Carolina	Democratic	1891–1965
Jo Bonner	2003–2013	Alabama	Republican	1959–present
Mary Bono	1998–2013	California	Republican	1961–present
Sonny Bono	1995–1998	California	Republican	1935–1998
Robert W. Bonynge	1904–1909	Colorado	Republican	1863–1939
Azariah Boody	1853	New York	Whig	1815–1885
David A. Boody	1891	New York	Democratic	1837–1930
Charles F. Booher	1889; 1907–1921	Missouri	Democratic	1848–1921
George Booker	1870–1871	Virginia	Conservative	1821–1883
Ratliff Boon	1825–1827; 1829–1839	Indiana	Democratic	1781–1844
Andrew Boone	1875–1879	Kentucky	Democratic	1831–1886
Walter Booth	1849–1851	Connecticut	Free Soiler	1791–1870
Melvin M. Boothman	1887–1891	Ohio	Republican	1846–1904
William S. Booze	1897–1899	Maryland	Republican	1862–1933
John Boozman	2001–2011	Arkansas	Republican	1950–present
Charles M. Borchers	1913–1915	Illinois	Democratic	1869–1946
Madeleine Bordallo	2003–2019	Guam	Democratic	1933–present
Nathaniel B. Borden	1835–1839	Massachusetts	Democratic	1801–1865
Nathaniel B. Borden	1841–1843	Massachusetts	Whig	1801–1865
Vincent Boreing	1899–1903	Kentucky	Republican	1839–1903
Dan Boren	2005–2013	Oklahoma	Democratic	1973–present
Lyle Boren	1937–1947	Oklahoma	Democratic	1909–1992
Charles Borland Jr.	1821–1823	New York	Democratic–Republican	1786–1852
William P. Borland	1909–1919	Missouri	Democratic	1867–1919
Robert Borski	1983–2003	Pennsylvania	Democratic	1948–present
Peter I. Borst	1829–1831	New York	Democratic	1797–1848
Albert H. Bosch	1953–1960	New York	Republican	1908–2005
Douglas Bosco	1983–1991	California	Democratic	1946–present
Reva Beck Bosone	1949–1953	Utah	Democratic	1895–1983
John Linscom Boss Jr.	1815–1819	Rhode Island	Federalist	1780–1819
Pierre Bossier	1843–1844	Louisiana	Democratic	1797–1844
Leonard Boswell	1997–2013	Iowa	Democratic	1934–2018
Alexander Boteler	1859–1861	Virginia	Oppositionist	1815–1892
Jeremiah D. Botkin	1897–1899	Kansas	Populist	1849–1921
John Botts	1839–1843; 1847–1849	Virginia	Whig	1802–1869
Rick Boucher	1983–2011	Virginia	Democratic	1946–present
Gabriel Bouck	1877–1881	Wisconsin	Democratic	1828–1904
Joseph Bouck	1831–1833	New York	Democratic	1788–1858
Thomas Boude	1801–1803	Pennsylvania	Federalist	1752–1822
Elias Boudinot	1789–1795	New Jersey	Pro-Administration	1740–1821
James Bouldin	1834–1839	Virginia	Democratic	1792–1854
Thomas Bouldin	1829–1834	Virginia	Democratic	1781–1834
John Edward Bouligny	1859–1861	Louisiana	American	1824–1864
Beau Boulter	1985–1989	Texas	Republican	1942–present
Franklin Bound	1885–1889	Pennsylvania	Republican	1829–1910
Carolyn Bourdeaux	2021–2023	Georgia	Democratic	1970–present
Benjamin Bourne	1790–1795	Rhode Island	Pro-Administration	1755–1808
Benjamin Bourne	1795–1796	Rhode Island	Federalist	1755–1808
Shearjashub Bourne	1791–1795	Massachusetts	Pro-Administration	1746–1806
Charles Boustany	2005–2017	Louisiana	Republican	1956–present
Henry Sherman Boutell	1897–1911	Illinois	Republican	1856–1926
Charles A. Boutelle	1883–1901	Maine	Republican	1839–1901
George S. Boutwell	1863–1869	Massachusetts	Republican	1818–1905
Matthias J. Bovee	1835–1837	New York	Democratic	1793–1872
Frank T. Bow	1951–1972	Ohio	Republican	1901–1972
George E. Bowden	1887–1891	Virginia	Republican	1852–1908
Stanley E. Bowdle	1913–1915	Ohio	Democratic	1868–1919
Franklin Welsh Bowdon	1846–1851	Alabama	Democratic	1817–1857
Christopher C. Bowen	1868–1871	South Carolina	Republican	1832–1880
David R. Bowen	1973–1983	Mississippi	Democratic	1932–present
Henry Bowen	1883–1885	Virginia	Readjuster	1841–1915
Henry Bowen	1887–1889	Virginia	Republican	1841–1915
John Henry Bowen	1813–1815	Tennessee	Democratic-Republican	1780–1822
Rees Bowen	1873–1875	Virginia	Democratic	1809–1879
Gustavus M. Bower	1843–1845	Missouri	Democratic	1790–1864
William H. Bower	1893–1895	North Carolina	Democratic	1850–1910
Eaton J. Bowers	1903–1911	Mississippi	Democratic	1865–1939
George Meade Bowers	1916–1923	West Virginia	Republican	1863–1925
John M. Bowers	1813	New York	Federalist	1772–1846
William W. Bowers	1891–1897	California	Republican	1834–1917
Justin De Witt Bowersock	1899–1907	Kansas	Republican	1842–1922
Richard Bowie	1849–1853	Maryland	Whig	1807–1881
Sydney J. Bowie	1901–1907	Alabama	Democratic	1865–1928
Thomas Fielder Bowie	1855–1859	Maryland	Democratic	1808–1869
Walter Bowie	1802–1805	Maryland	Democratic-Republican	1748–1810
James B. Bowler	1953–1957	Illinois	Democratic	1875–1957
Chester Bowles	1959–1961	Connecticut	Democratic	1901–1986
Henry L. Bowles	1925–1929	Massachusetts	Republican	1866–1932
James B. Bowlin	1843–1851	Missouri	Democratic	1804–1874
William B. Bowling	1920–1928	Alabama	Democratic	1870–1946
Charles Calvin Bowman	1911–1912	Pennsylvania	Republican	1852–1941
Frank Llewellyn Bowman	1925–1933	West Virginia	Republican	1879–1936
Jamaal Bowman	2021–2025	New York	Democratic	1976–present
Selwyn Z. Bowman	1879–1883	Massachusetts	Republican	1840–1928
Thomas Bowman	1891–1893	Iowa	Democratic	1848–1917
Obadiah Bowne	1851–1853	New York	Whig	1822–1874
Samuel S. Bowne	1841–1843	New York	Democratic	1800–1865
John C. Box	1919–1931	Texas	Democratic	1871–1941
Barbara Boxer	1983–1993	California	Democratic	1940–present
William H. Boyce	1923–1925	Delaware	Democratic	1855–1942
William W. Boyce	1853–1860	South Carolina	Democratic	1818–1890
Adam Boyd	1803–1805; 1808–1813	New Jersey	Democratic-Republican	1746–1835
Alexander Boyd	1813–1815	New York	Federalist	1764–1857
Allen Boyd	1997–2011	Florida	Democratic	1945–present
John Frank Boyd	1907–1909	Nebraska	Republican	1853–1945
John H. Boyd	1851–1853	New York	Whig	1799–1868
Linn Boyd	1835–1837; 1839–1855	Kentucky	Democratic	1800–1859
Sempronius H. Boyd	1863–1865	Missouri	Unconditional Unionist	1828–1894
Sempronius H. Boyd	1869–1871	Missouri	Republican	1828–1894
Thomas A. Boyd	1877–1881	Illinois	Republican	1830–1897
Nancy Boyda	2007–2009	Kansas	Democratic	1955–present
Nathaniel Boyden	1847–1849	North Carolina	Whig	1796–1873
Nathaniel Boyden	1868–1869	North Carolina	Conservative	1796–1873
Benjamin Markley Boyer	1865–1869	Pennsylvania	Democratic	1823–1887
Lewis L. Boyer	1937–1939	Illinois	Democratic	1886–1944
Frank W. Boykin	1935–1963	Alabama	Democratic	1885–1969
John J. Boylan	1923–1938	New York	Democratic	1878–1938
Charles A. Boyle	1955–1959	Illinois	Democratic	1907–1959
Charles Edmund Boyle	1883–1887	Pennsylvania	Democratic	1836–1888
John Boyle	1803–1809	Kentucky	Democratic-Republican	1774–1835
Reese Bowen Brabson	1859–1861	Tennessee	Oppositionist	1817–1863
Jonathan Brace	1798–1800	Connecticut	Federalist	1754–1837
Henry Marie Brackenridge	1840–1841	Pennsylvania	Whig	1786–1871
George Bradbury	1813–1817	Massachusetts	Federalist	1770–1823
Theophilus Bradbury	1795–1797	Massachusetts	Federalist	1739–1803
John Brademas	1959–1981	Indiana	Democratic	1927–2016
Allen Alexander Bradford	1865–1867; 1869–1871	Colorado	Republican	1815–1888
Taul Bradford	1875–1877	Alabama	Democratic	1835–1883
Edward Bradley	1847	Michigan	Democratic	1808–1847
Frederick Van Ness Bradley	1939–1947	Michigan	Republican	1898–1947
Jeb Bradley	2003–2007	New Hampshire	Republican	1952–present
Michael J. Bradley	1937–1947	Pennsylvania	Democratic	1897–1979
Nathan B. Bradley	1873–1877	Michigan	Republican	1831–1906
Thomas J. Bradley	1897–1901	New York	Democratic	1870–1901
Thomas W. Bradley	1903–1913	New York	Republican	1844–1920
William C. Bradley	1813–1815; 1823–1825	Vermont	Democratic-Republican	1782–1867
William C. Bradley	1825–1827	Vermont	National Republican	1782–1867
Willis W. Bradley	1947–1949	California	Republican	1884–1954
Samuel Carey Bradshaw	1855–1857	Pennsylvania	Oppositionist	1809–1872
Bob Brady	1998–2019	Pennsylvania	Democratic	1945–present
James Dennis Brady	1885–1887	Virginia	Republican	1843–1900
Jasper E. Brady	1847–1849	Pennsylvania	Whig	1797–1871
Kevin Brady	1997–2023	Texas	Republican	1955–present
Edward S. Bragg	1877–1883; 1885–1887	Wisconsin	Democratic	1827–1912
John Bragg	1851–1853	Alabama	Democratic	1806–1878
Samuel Myron Brainerd	1883–1885	Pennsylvania	Republican	1842–1898
Bruce Braley	2007–2015	Iowa	Democratic	1957–present
Ernest K. Bramblett	1947–1955	California	Republican	1901–1966
John Branch	1831–1833	North Carolina	Democratic	1782–1863
Lawrence O'Bryan Branch	1855–1861	North Carolina	Democratic	1820–1862
William A. B. Branch	1891–1895	North Carolina	Democratic	1847–1910
Charles Brand	1923–1933	Ohio	Republican	1871–1966
Charles H. Brand	1917–1933	Georgia	Democratic	1861–1933
Augustus Brandegee	1863–1867	Connecticut	Republican	1828–1904
Frank B. Brandegee	1902–1905	Connecticut	Republican	1864–1924
William G. Brantley	1897–1913	Georgia	Democratic	1860–1934
Frank J. Brasco	1967–1975	New York	Democratic	1932–1998
Dave Brat	2014–2019	Virginia	Republican	1964–present
John Bratton	1884–1885	South Carolina	Democratic	1831–1898
Robert F. Brattan	1893–1894	Maryland	Democratic	1845–1894
William H. Brawley	1891–1894	South Carolina	Democratic	1841–1916
Elliott M. Braxton	1871–1873	Virginia	Democratic	1823–1891
William G. Bray	1951–1975	Indiana	Republican	1903–1979
William D. Brayton	1857–1861	Rhode Island	Republican	1815–1887
John Breaux	1972–1987	Louisiana	Democratic	1944–present
Phanor Breazeale	1899–1905	Louisiana	Democratic	1858–1934
Daniel Breck	1849–1851	Kentucky	Whig	1788–1871
Samuel Breck	1823–1825	Pennsylvania	Federalist	1771–1862
Clifton R. Breckinridge	1883–1890; 1890–1894	Arkansas	Democratic	1846–1932
James Breckinridge	1809–1817	Virginia	Federalist	1763–1833
James D. Breckinridge	1821–1823	Kentucky	Democratic-Republican	1781–1849
John B. Breckinridge	1973–1979	Kentucky	Democratic	1913–1979
John C. Breckinridge	1851–1855	Kentucky	Democratic	1821–1875
William Campbell Preston Breckinridge	1885–1895	Kentucky	Democratic	1837–1904
J. Floyd Breeding	1957–1963	Kansas	Democratic	1901–1977
Edward G. Breen	1949–1951	Ohio	Democratic	1908–1991
Walter E. Brehm	1943–1953	Ohio	Republican	1892–1971
Edward Breitung	1883–1885	Michigan	Republican	1831–1887
Robert G. Bremner	1913–1914	New Jersey	Democratic	1874–1914
Francis Brengle	1843–1845	Maryland	Whig	1807–1846
Joseph E. Brennan	1987–1991	Maine	Democratic	1934–2024
Martin A. Brennan	1933–1937	Illinois	Democratic	1879–1941
Vincent M. Brennan	1921–1923	Michigan	Republican	1890–1959
John Lewis Brenner	1897–1901	Ohio	Democratic	1832–1906
Richard Brent	1795–1799; 1801–1803	Virginia	Democratic-Republican	1757–1814
William L. Brent	1823–1825	Louisiana	Democratic-Republican	1784–1848
William L. Brent	1825–1829	Louisiana	National Republican	1784–1848
Lorenzo Brentano	1877–1879	Illinois	Republican	1813–1891
Samuel Brenton	1851–1853	Indiana	Whig	1810–1857
Samuel Brenton	1855–1857	Indiana	Oppositionist	1810–1857
Samuel Brenton	1857	Indiana	Republican	1810–1857
Thomas Hurley Brents	1879–1885	Washington	Republican	1840–1916
John L. Bretz	1891–1895	Indiana	Democratic	1852–1920
Joseph Brevard	1819–1821	South Carolina	Democratic-Republican	1766–1821
Francis B. Brewer	1883–1885	New York	Republican	1820–1892
J. Hart Brewer	1881–1885	New Jersey	Republican	1844–1900
Mark S. Brewer	1877–1881; 1887–1891	Michigan	Republican	1837–1901
Willis Brewer	1897–1901	Alabama	Democratic	1844–1912
Daniel Brewster	1959–1963	Maryland	Democratic	1923–2007
David P. Brewster	1839–1843	New York	Democratic	1801–1876
Henry C. Brewster	1895–1899	New York	Republican	1845–1928
Owen Brewster	1935–1941	Maine	Republican	1888–1961
Bill Brewster	1991–1997	Oklahoma	Democratic	1941–2022
Abraham L. Brick	1899–1908	Indiana	Republican	1860–1908
George H. Brickner	1889–1895	Wisconsin	Democratic	1834–1904
Jim Bridenstine	2013–2018	Oklahoma	Republican	1975–present
George Washington Bridges	1861–1863	Tennessee	Unionist	1825–1873
Samuel A. Bridges	1848–1849; 1853–1855; 1877–1879	Pennsylvania	Democratic	1802–1884
Clay Stone Briggs	1919–1933	Texas	Democratic	1876–1933
George Briggs	1849–1853; 1859–1861	New York	Whig	1805–1869
George N. Briggs	1831–1837	Massachusetts	National Republican	1796–1861
George N. Briggs	1837–1843	Massachusetts	Whig	1796–1861
James F. Briggs	1877–1883	New Hampshire	Republican	1827–1905
Elbert S. Brigham	1925–1931	Vermont	Republican	1877–1962
Elijah Brigham	1811–1816	Massachusetts	Federalist	1751–1816
Lewis A. Brigham	1879–1881	New Jersey	Republican	1831–1885
Bobby Bright	2009–2011	Alabama	Democratic	1952–present
John M. Bright	1871–1881	Tennessee	Democratic	1817–1911
Anthony Brindisi	2019–2021	New York	Democratic	1978–present
Henry R. Brinkerhoff	1843–1844	Ohio	Democratic	1787–1844
Jacob Brinkerhoff	1843–1847	Ohio	Democratic	1810–1880
Jack Brinkley	1967–1983	Georgia	Democratic	1930–2019
Samuel M. Brinson	1919–1922	North Carolina	Democratic	1870–1922
John Brisbin	1851	Pennsylvania	Democratic	1818–1880
Francis Bristow	1854–1855	Kentucky	Whig	1804–1864
Francis Bristow	1859–1861	Kentucky	Oppositionist	1804–1864
Henry Bristow	1901–1903	New York	Republican	1840–1906
James Jefferson Britt	1915–1917; 1919	North Carolina	Republican	1861–1939
Charles Robin Britt	1983–1985	North Carolina	Democratic	1942–present
Frederick A. Britten	1913–1935	Illinois	Republican	1871–1946
James Broadhead	1883–1885	Missouri	Democratic	1819–1898
Bill Brock	1963–1971	Tennessee	Republican	1930–2021
Lawrence Brock	1959–1961	Nebraska	Democratic	1906–1968
William H. Brockenbrough	1846–1847	Florida	Democratic	1812–1850
Franklin Brockson	1913–1915	Delaware	Democratic	1865–1942
John H. Brockway	1839–1843	Connecticut	Whig	1801–1870
Andrew R. Brodbeck	1913–1915; 1917–1919	Pennsylvania	Democratic	1860–1937
Case Broderick	1891–1899	Kansas	Republican	1839–1920
Joseph Davis Brodhead	1907–1909	Pennsylvania	Democratic	1859–1920
John Brodhead	1829–1833	New Hampshire	Democratic	1770–1838
John C. Brodhead	1831–1833; 1837–1839	New York	Democratic	1780–1859
Richard Brodhead	1843–1849	Pennsylvania	Democratic	1811–1863
William M. Brodhead	1975–1983	Michigan	Democratic	1941–present
Curtis Hooks Brogden	1877–1879	North Carolina	Republican	1816–1901
Frederick G. Bromberg	1873–1875	Alabama	Liberal Republican	1837–1930
Henry P. H. Bromwell	1865–1869	Illinois	Republican	1823–1903
Jacob H. Bromwell	1894–1903	Ohio	Republican	1848–1924
James E. Bromwell	1961–1965	Iowa	Republican	1920–2009
David Bronson	1841–1843	Maine	Whig	1800–1863
Isaac H. Bronson	1837–1839	New York	Democratic	1802–1855
Moses L. Broocks	1905–1907	Texas	Democratic	1864–1908
David Brooks	1797–1799	New York	Federalist	1756–1838
Edward S. Brooks	1919–1923	Pennsylvania	Republican	1867–1957
Edwin B. Brooks	1919–1923	Illinois	Republican	1868–1933
Franklin E. Brooks	1903–1907	Colorado	Republican	1860–1916
George M. Brooks	1869–1872	Massachusetts	Republican	1824–1893
J. Twing Brooks	1933–1937	Pennsylvania	Democratic	1884–1956
Jack Brooks	1953–1995	Texas	Democratic	1922–2012
James Brooks	1849–1853	New York	Democratic	1810–1873
James Brooks	1867–1873	New York	Whig	1810–1873
Micah Brooks	1815–1817	New York	Democratic–Republican	1775–1857
Mo Brooks	2011–2023	Alabama	Republican	1954–present
Overton Brooks	1937–1961	Louisiana	Democratic	1897–1961
Preston Brooks	1853–1856; 1856–1857	South Carolina	Democratic	1819–1857
Susan Brooks	2013–2021	Indiana	Republican	1960–present
Elijah V. Brookshire	1889–1895	Indiana	Democratic	1856–1936
Jacob Broom	1855–1857	Pennsylvania	American	1808–1864
James M. Broom	1805–1807	Delaware	Federalist	1776–1850
John M. Broomall	1863–1869	Pennsylvania	Republican	1816–1894
William Broomfield	1957–1993	Michigan	Republican	1922–2019
John C. Brophy	1947–1949	Wisconsin	Republican	1901–1976
Marriott Brosius	1889–1901	Pennsylvania	Republican	1843–1901
Donald G. Brotzman	1963–1965; 1967–1975	Colorado	Republican	1922–2004
Paul Broun	2007–2015	Georgia	Republican	1946–present
Robert F. Broussard	1897–1915	Louisiana	Democratic	1864–1918
Glen Browder	1989–1997	Alabama	Democratic	1943–present
John M. Brower	1887–1891	North Carolina	Republican	1845–1913
Aaron V. Brown	1839–1845	Tennessee	Democratic	1795–1859
Albert G. Brown	1839–1841; 1847–1853	Mississippi	Democratic	1813–1880
Anson Brown	1839–1840	New York	Whig	1800–1840
Anthony Brown	2017–2023	Maryland	Democratic	1961–present
Benjamin Brown	1815–1817	Massachusetts	Federalist	1756–1831
Charles Brown	1841–1843; 1847–1849	Pennsylvania	Democratic	1797–1883
Charles Elwood Brown	1885–1889	Ohio	Republican	1834–1904
Charles Harrison Brown	1957–1961	Missouri	Democratic	1920–2003
Clarence J. Brown	1939–1965	Ohio	Republican	1893–1965
Bud Brown	1965–1983	Ohio	Republican	1927–2022
Corrine Brown	1993–2017	Florida	Democratic	1946–present
Elias Brown	1829–1831	Maryland	Democratic	1793–1857
Foster V. Brown	1895–1897	Tennessee	Republican	1852–1937
Garry E. Brown	1967–1979	Michigan	Republican	1923–1998
George Brown Jr.	1963–1971; 1973–1999	California	Democratic	1920–1999
George Houston Brown	1851–1853	New Jersey	Whig	1810–1865
Hank Brown	1981–1991	Colorado	Republican	1940–present
Henry Brown	2001–2011	South Carolina	Republican	1935–present
James S. Brown	1863–1865	Wisconsin	Democratic	1824–1878
James W. Brown	1903–1905	Pennsylvania	Independent Republican	1844–1909
Jason B. Brown	1889–1895	Indiana	Democratic	1839–1898
Jeremiah Brown	1841–1845	Pennsylvania	Whig	1785–1858
John Brown	1789–1792	Virginia	Anti-Administration	1757–1837
John S. Brown	1809–1810	Maryland	Democratic-Republican	c. 1760–1815
John Brown	1821–1825	Pennsylvania	Democratic-Republican	1772–1845
John Brown	1799–1801	Rhode Island	Federalist	1736–1803
John B. Brown	1892–1893	Maryland	Democratic	1836–1898
John Robert Brown	1887–1889	Virginia	Republican	1842–1927
John W. Brown	1833–1837	New York	Democratic	1796–1875
John Y. Brown	1860–1861; 1873–1877	Kentucky	Democratic	1835–1904
John Y. Brown Sr.	1933–1935	Kentucky	Democratic	1900–1985
Joe Brown	1921–1923	Tennessee	Republican	1880–1939
Lathrop Brown	1913–1915	New York	Democratic	1883–1959
Milton Brown	1841–1847	Tennessee	Whig	1804–1883
Paul Brown	1933–1961	Georgia	Democratic	1880–1961
Prentiss M. Brown	1933–1936	Michigan	Democratic	1889–1973
Robert Brown	1798–1815	Pennsylvania	Democratic-Republican	1744–1823
Seth W. Brown	1897–1901	Ohio	Republican	1841–1923
Sherrod Brown	1993–2007	Ohio	Democratic	1952–present
Titus Brown	1825–1829	New Hampshire	National Republican	1786–1849
Webster E. Brown	1901–1907	Wisconsin	Republican	1851–1929
William Brown	1819–1821	Kentucky	Democratic-Republican	1779–1833
William G. Brown Sr.	1845–1849	Virginia	Democratic	1800–1884
William G. Brown Sr.	1861–1863	Virginia	Unionist	1800–1884
William G. Brown Sr.	1863–1865	West Virginia	Unconditional Unionist	1800–1884
William Gay Brown Jr.	1911–1916	West Virginia	Democratic	1856–1916
William J. Brown	1843–1845; 1849–1851	Indiana	Democratic	1805–1857
William Ripley Brown	1875–1877	Kansas	Republican	1840–1916
William Wallace Brown	1883–1887	Pennsylvania	Republican	1836–1926
Ginny Brown-Waite	2003–2011	Florida	Republican	1943–present
Sam Brownback	1995–1996	Kansas	Republican	1956–present
Charles Browne	1923–1925	New Jersey	Democratic	1875–1947
Edward E. Browne	1913–1931	Wisconsin	Republican	1868–1945
George H. Browne	1861–1863	Rhode Island	Unionist	1811–1885
Thomas H. B. Browne	1887–1891	Virginia	Republican	1844–1892
Thomas M. Browne	1877–1891	Indiana	Republican	1829–1891
Gordon Browning	1923–1935	Tennessee	Democratic	1889–1976
William J. Browning	1911–1920	New Jersey	Republican	1850–1920
Walter P. Brownlow	1897–1910	Tennessee	Republican	1851–1910
Charles B. Brownson	1951–1959	Indiana	Republican	1914–1988
Jim Broyhill	1963–1986	North Carolina	Republican	1927–2023
Joel Broyhill	1953–1974	Virginia	Republican	1919–2006
Donald C. Bruce	1961–1965	Indiana	Republican	1921–1969
Phineas Bruce	1803	Massachusetts	Federalist	1762–1809
Terry L. Bruce	1985–1993	Illinois	Democratic	1944–2026
Ferdinand Brucker	1897–1899	Michigan	Democratic	1858–1904
Henry Bruckner	1913–1917	New York	Democratic	1871–1942
Clement Laird Brumbaugh	1913–1921	Ohio	Democratic	1863–1921
D. Emmert Brumbaugh	1943–1947	Pennsylvania	Republican	1894–1977
Charles N. Brumm	1881–1889; 1895–1899	Pennsylvania	Republican	1838–1917
Charles N. Brumm	1906–1909	Pennsylvania	Greenbacker	1838–1917
George F. Brumm	1923–1927; 1929–1934	Pennsylvania	Republican	1880–1934
Stephen Brundidge Jr.	1897–1909	Arkansas	Democratic	1857–1938
David B. Brunner	1889–1893	Pennsylvania	Democratic	1835–1903
William F. Brunner	1929–1935	New York	Democratic	1887–1965
Henry Brush	1819–1821	Ohio	Democratic-Republican	1778–1855
Andrew DeWitt Bruyn	1837–1838	New York	Democratic	1790–1838
Guy M. Bryan	1857–1859	Texas	Democratic	1821–1901
Henry Hunter Bryan	1819–1821	Tennessee	Democratic-Republican	1786–1835
James W. Bryan	1913–1915	Washington	Progressive	1874–1956
John Heritage Bryan	1825–1827	North Carolina	Democratic	1798–1870
John Heritage Bryan	1827–1829	North Carolina	National Republican	1798–1870
Joseph Bryan	1803–1806	Georgia	Democratic-Republican	1773–1812
Joseph Hunter Bryan	1815–1819	North Carolina	Democratic-Republican	1782–1839
Nathan Bryan	1795–1798	North Carolina	Democratic-Republican	1748–1798
William Jennings Bryan	1891–1895	Nebraska	Democratic	1860–1925
Ed Bryant	1995–2003	Tennessee	Republican	1948–present
John Bryant	1983–1997	Texas	Democratic	1947–present
Lloyd Bryce	1887–1889	New York	Democratic	1851–1917
Joseph R. Bryson	1939–1953	South Carolina	Democratic	1893–1953
Andrew Buchanan	1835–1839	Pennsylvania	Democratic	1780–1848
Frank Buchanan	1911–1917	Illinois	Democratic	1862–1930
Frank Buchanan	1946–1951	Pennsylvania	Democratic	1902–1951
Hugh Buchanan	1881–1885	Georgia	Democratic	1823–1890
James Buchanan	1821–1831	Pennsylvania	Democratic	1791–1868
James Buchanan	1885–1893	New Jersey	Republican	1839–1900
James P. Buchanan	1913–1937	Texas	Democratic	1867–1937
John A. Buchanan	1889–1893	Virginia	Democratic	1843–1921
John H. Buchanan Jr.	1965–1981	Alabama	Republican	1928–2018
Vera Buchanan	1951–1955	Pennsylvania	Democratic	1902–1955
John Conrad Bucher	1831–1833	Pennsylvania	Democratic	1792–1851
Alfred Eliab Buck	1869–1871	Alabama	Republican	1832–1902
Charles F. Buck	1895–1897	Louisiana	Democratic	1841–1918
Daniel Buck	1795–1797	Vermont	Federalist	1753–1816
D. Azro A. Buck	1823–1825	Vermont	Democratic-Republican	1789–1841
D. Azro A. Buck	1827–1829	Vermont	National Republican	1789–1841
Ellsworth B. Buck	1944–1949	New York	Republican	1892–1970
Frank H. Buck	1933–1942	California	Democratic	1887–1942
John R. Buck	1881–1883; 1885–1887	Connecticut	Republican	1835–1917
Ken Buck	2015–2024	Colorado	Republican	1959–present
Charles R. Buckalew	1887–1891	Pennsylvania	Democratic	1821–1899
John T. Buckbee	1927–1936	Illinois	Republican	1871–1936
Ralph Pomeroy Buckland	1865–1869	Ohio	Republican	1812–1892
Rich T. Buckler	1935–1943	Minnesota	Farmer-Labor	1865–1950
Charles A. Buckley	1935–1965	New York	Democratic	1890–1967
C. W. Buckley	1868–1873	Alabama	Republican	1835–1906
James R. Buckley	1923–1925	Illinois	Democratic	1870–1945
James V. Buckley	1949–1951	Illinois	Democratic	1894–1954
Clarence Buckman	1903–1907	Minnesota	Republican	1851–1917
Aylett H. Buckner	1873–1885	Missouri	Democratic	1816–1894
Aylette Buckner	1847–1849	Kentucky	Whig	1806–1869
Richard A. Buckner	1823–1825	Kentucky	Democratic-Republican	1763–1847
Richard A. Buckner	1825–1829	Kentucky	National Republican	1763–1847
Larry Bucshon	2011–2025	Indiana	Republican	1962–present
James Budd	1883–1885	California	Democratic	1851–1908
Ted Budd	2017–2023	North Carolina	Republican	1971–present
Hamer Budge	1951–1961	Idaho	Republican	1910–2003
Jack Buechner	1987–1991	Missouri	Republican	1940–2020
Alexander W. Buel	1849–1851	Michigan	Democratic	1813–1868
Alexander H. Buell	1851–1853	New York	Democratic	1801–1853
Ann Marie Buerkle	2011–2013	New York	Republican	1951–present
Howard Buffett	1943–1949; 1951–1953	Nebraska	Republican	1903–1964
James Buffington	1855–1857	Massachusetts	American	1817–1875
James Buffington	1857–1863	Massachusetts	Republican	1817–1875
James Buffington	1869–1875	Massachusetts	Republican	1817–1875
Joseph Buffington	1843–1847	Pennsylvania	Whig	1803–1872
Joseph Buffum Jr.	1819–1821	New Hampshire	Democratic-Republican	1784–1874
Robert M. Bugg	1853–1855	Tennessee	Whig	1805–1887
Robert J. Bulkley	1911–1915	Ohio	Democratic	1880–1965
John Bull	1833–1835	Missouri	National Republican	1803–1863
Melville Bull	1895–1903	Rhode Island	Republican	1854–1909
Henry A. Bullard	1831–1834	Louisiana	National Republican	1788–1851
Henry A. Bullard	1850–1851	Louisiana	Whig	1788–1851
Robert Bullock	1889–1893	Florida	Democratic	1828–1905
Stephen Bullock	1797–1799	Massachusetts	Federalist	1735–1816
Wingfield Bullock	1821	Kentucky	Democratic-Republican	died 1821
Alfred L. Bulwinkle	1921–1929; 1931–1950	North Carolina	Democratic	1883–1950
Samuel Bunch	1833–1835	Tennessee	Democratic'	1786–1849
Samuel Bunch	1835–1837	Tennessee	National Republican	1786–1849
Hezekiah S. Bundy	1865–1867; 1873–1875; 1893–1895	Ohio	Republican	1817–1895
Solomon Bundy	1877–1879	New York	Republican	1823–1889
Berkeley L. Bunker	1945–1947	Nevada	Democratic	1906–1999
Benjamin H. Bunn	1889–1895	North Carolina	Democratic	1844–1907
Jim Bunn	1995–1997	Oregon	Republican	1956–present
Frank C. Bunnell	1872–1873; 1885–1889	Pennsylvania	Republican	1842–1911
Rudolph Bunner	1827–1829	New York	Democratic	1779–1837
Jim Bunning	1987–1999	Kentucky	Republican	1931–2017
Thomas L. Bunting	1891–1893	New York	Democratic	1844–1898
John Chilton Burch	1859–1861	California	Democratic	1826–1885
Thomas G. Burch	1931–1946	Virginia	Democratic	1869–1951
Horatio C. Burchard	1869–1879	Illinois	Republican	1825–1908
Samuel D. Burchard	1875–1877	Wisconsin	Democratic	1836–1901
Thomas F. Burchill	1943–1945	New York	Democratic	1882–1955
George Burd	1831–1835	Pennsylvania	National Republican	1793–1844
Samuel Swinfin Burdett	1869–1873	Missouri	Republican	1836–1914
Clark Burdick	1919–1933	Rhode Island	Republican	1868–1948
Quentin Burdick	1959–1960	North Dakota	Democratic	1908–1992
Theodore Weld Burdick	1877–1879	Iowa	Republican	1836–1898
Usher L. Burdick	1935–1945; 1949–1959	North Dakota	Republican	1879–1960
Clair Burgener	1973–1983	California	Republican	1921–2006
Dempsey Burges	1795–1799	North Carolina	Democratic-Republican	1751–1800
Tristam Burges	1825–1835	Rhode Island	National Republican	1770–1853
George F. Burgess	1901–1917	Texas	Democratic	1861–1919
Michael C. Burgess	2003–2025	Texas	Republican	1950–present
William O. Burgin	1939–1946	North Carolina	Democratic	1877–1946
Henry Burk	1901–1903	Pennsylvania	Republican	1850–1903
Aedanus Burke	1789–1791	South Carolina	Anti-Administration	1743–1802
Charles H. Burke	1899–1907; 1909–1915	South Dakota	Republican	1861–1944
Edmund Burke	1839–1845	New Hampshire	Democratic	1809–1882
Edward R. Burke	1933–1935	Nebraska	Democratic	1880–1968
Frank W. Burke	1959–1963	Kentucky	Democratic	1920–2007
J. Herbert Burke	1967–1979	Florida	Republican	1913–1993
James A. Burke	1959–1979	Massachusetts	Democratic	1910–1983
James F. Burke	1905–1915	Pennsylvania	Republican	1867–1932
John H. Burke	1933–1935	California	Democratic	1894–1951
Michael E. Burke	1911–1917	Wisconsin	Democratic	1863–1918
Raymond H. Burke	1947–1949	Ohio	Republican	1881–1954
Robert E. Burke	1897–1901	Texas	Democratic	1847–1901
Thomas Henry Burke	1949–1951	Ohio	Democratic	1904–1959
William J. Burke	1919–1923	Pennsylvania	Republican	1862–1925
Yvonne Brathwaite Burke	1973–1979	California	Democratic	1932–present
Elmer Burkett	1899–1905	Nebraska	Republican	1867–1935
Everett G. Burkhalter	1963–1965	California	Democratic	1897–1975
Edwin C. Burleigh	1897–1911	Maine	Republican	1843–1916
Henry G. Burleigh	1883–1887	New York	Republican	1832–1900
John H. Burleigh	1873–1877	Maine	Republican	1822–1877
Walter A. Burleigh	1865–1869	Dakota	Republican	1820–1896
William Burleigh	1823–1825	Maine	Democratic-Republican	1785–1827
William Burleigh	1825–1827	Maine	National Republican	1785–1827
Albert S. Burleson	1899–1913	Texas	Democratic	1863–1937
Omar Burleson	1947–1978	Texas	Democratic	1906–1991
Anson Burlingame	1855–1857	Massachusetts	American	1820–1870
Anson Burlingame	1857–1861	Massachusetts	Republican	1820–1870
Bill Burlison	1969–1981	Missouri	Democratic	1931–2019
Barker Burnell	1841–1843	Massachusetts	Whig	1798–1843
Daniel D. Burnes	1893–1895	Missouri	Democratic	1851–1899
James N. Burnes	1883–1889	Missouri	Democratic	1827–1889
Edward Burnett	1887–1889	Massachusetts	Democratic	1849–1925
Henry Cornelius Burnett	1855–1861	Kentucky	Democratic	1825–1866
John L. Burnett	1899–1919	Alabama	Democratic	1854–1919
William E. Burney	1940–1941	Colorado	Democratic	1893–1969
Alfred A. Burnham	1859–1863	Connecticut	Republican	1819–1879
George Burnham	1933–1937	California	Republican	1868–1939
John A. Burns	1957–1959	Hawaii	Democratic	1909–1975
Joseph Burns	1857–1859	Ohio	Democratic	1800–1875
Max Burns	2003–2005	Georgia	Republican	1948–present
Robert Burns	1833–1837	New Hampshire	Democratic	1792–1866
M. G. Burnside	1949–1953; 1955–1957	West Virginia	Democratic	1902–1991
Thomas Burnside	1815–1816	Pennsylvania	Democratic-Republican	1782–1851
Albert G. Burr	1867–1871	Illinois	Democratic	1829–1882
Richard Burr	1995–2005	North Carolina	Republican	1955–present
Orlando Burrell	1895–1897	Illinois	Republican	1826–1921
Sherman Everett Burroughs	1917–1923	New Hampshire	Republican	1870–1923
Silas M. Burroughs	1857–1860	New York	Republican	1810–1860
Daniel Burrows	1821–1823	Connecticut	Democratic-Republican	1766–1858
Joseph H. Burrows	1881–1883	Missouri	Greenbacker	1840–1914
Julius C. Burrows	1873–1875; 1879–1883; 1885–1895	Michigan	Republican	1837–1915
Lorenzo Burrows	1849–1853	New York	Whig	1805–1885
Armistead Burt	1843–1853	South Carolina	Democratic	1802–1883
Olger B. Burtness	1921–1933	North Dakota	Republican	1884–1960
Charles G. Burton	1895–1897	Missouri	Republican	1846–1926
Clarence G. Burton	1948–1953	Virginia	Democratic	1886–1982
Dan Burton	1983–2013	Indiana	Republican	1938–present
Hiram R. Burton	1905–1909	Delaware	Republican	1841–1927
Hutchins Gordon Burton	1819–1824	North Carolina	Democratic-Republican	1774–1836
John Burton	1974–1983	California	Democratic	1932–2025
Laurence J. Burton	1963–1971	Utah	Republican	1926–2002
Phillip Burton	1964–1983	California	Democratic	1926–1983
Sala Burton	1983–1987	California	Democratic	1925–1987
Theodore E. Burton	1889–1891; 1895–1909; 1921–1928	Ohio	Republican	1851–1929
William A. Burwell	1806–1821	Virginia	Democratic-Republican	1780–1821
Fred E. Busbey	1943–1945; 1947–1949; 1951–1955	Illinois	Republican	1895–1966
George H. Busby	1851–1853	Ohio	Republican	1794–1869
T. Jeff Busby	1923–1935	Mississippi	Democratic	1884–1964
Samuel T. Busey	1891–1893	Illinois	Democratic	1835–1909
Alvin Bush	1951–1959	Pennsylvania	Republican	1893–1959
Cori Bush	2021–2025	Missouri	Democratic	1976–present
George H. W. Bush	1967–1971	Texas	Republican	1924–2018
Allen R. Bushnell	1891–1893	Wisconsin	Democratic	1833–1909
Robert G. Bushong	1927–1929	Pennsylvania	Republican	1883–1951
Albert Bustamante	1985–1993	Texas	Democratic	1935–2021
Cheri Bustos	2013–2023	Illinois	Democratic	1961–present
Benjamin Butler	1867–1875	Massachusetts	Republican	1818–1893
Benjamin Butler	1877–1879	Massachusetts	Republican	1818–1893
Chester P. Butler	1847–1850	Pennsylvania	Whig	1798–1850
Ezra Butler	1813–1815	Vermont	Democratic-Republican	1763–1838
James Joseph Butler	1901–1902; 1902–1903; 1903–1905	Missouri	Democratic	1862–1917
John Cornelius Butler	1941–1949; 1951–1953	New York	Republican	1887–1953
Josiah Butler	1817–1823	New Hampshire	Democratic-Republican	1779–1854
M. Caldwell Butler	1972–1983	Virginia	Republican	1925–2014
Mounce G. Butler	1905–1907	Tennessee	Democratic	1849–1917
Robert R. Butler	1928–1933	Oregon	Republican	1881–1933
Roderick R. Butler	1867–1875; 1887–1889	Tennessee	Republican	1827–1902
Sampson H. Butler	1839–1842	South Carolina	Democratic	1803–1848
Thomas Butler	1818–1821	Louisiana	Democratic-Republican	1785–1847
Thomas B. Butler	1849–1851	Connecticut	Whig	1806–1873
Thomas S. Butler	1897–1899	Pennsylvania	Independent Republican	1855–1928
Thomas S. Butler	1899–1928	Pennsylvania	Republican	1855–1928
Walter H. Butler	1891–1893	Iowa	Democratic	1852–1931
William Butler	1801–1813	South Carolina	Democratic-Republican	1759–1821
William Butler	1841–1843	South Carolina	Whig	1790–1850
William O. Butler	1839–1843	Kentucky	Democratic	1791–1880
Samuel Butman	1827–1831	Maine	National Republican	1788–1864
G. K. Butterfield	2004–2022	North Carolina	Democratic	1947–present
Martin Butterfield	1859–1861	New York	Republican	1790–1866
Benjamin Butterworth	1879–1883; 1885–1891	Ohio	Republican	1837–1898
Daniel E. Button	1967–1971	New York	Republican	1917–2009
Charles W. Buttz	1876–1877	South Carolina	Republican	1837–1913
Steve Buyer	1993–2011	Indiana	Republican	1958–present
Jesse Atherton Bynum	1833–1841	North Carolina	Democratic	1797–1868
William D. Bynum	1885–1895	Indiana	Democratic	1846–1927
Adam M. Byrd	1903–1911	Mississippi	Democratic	1859–1912
Robert Byrd	1953–1959	West Virginia	Democratic	1917–2010
Bradley Byrne	2014–2021	Alabama	Republican	1955–present
Emmet Byrne	1957–1959	Illinois	Republican	1896–1974
James A. Byrne	1953–1973	Pennsylvania	Democratic	1906–1980
Leslie Byrne	1993–1995	Virginia	Democratic	1946–present
William T. Byrne	1937–1952	New York	Democratic	1876–1952
James F. Byrnes	1911–1925	South Carolina	Democratic	1882–1972
John W. Byrnes	1945–1973	Wisconsin	Republican	1913–1985
Jo Byrns	1909–1936	Tennessee	Democratic	1869–1936
Joseph W. Byrns Jr.	1939–1941	Tennessee	Democratic	1903–1973
Samuel Byrns	1891–1893	Missouri	Democratic	1848–1914
Beverly Byron	1979–1993	Maryland	Democratic	1932–2025
Goodloe Byron	1971–1978	Maryland	Democratic	1929–1978
Katharine Byron	1941–1943	Maryland	Democratic	1903–1976
William D. Byron	1939–1941	Maryland	Democratic	1895–1941
