= Pennsylvania's 28th congressional district =

Former U.S. House district in Pennsylvania

Coordinates: 40°25′N 80°00′W

- Obsolete district
- Created: 1889
- Eliminated: 1960
- Years active: 1889-1963

Pennsylvania's 28th congressional district was one of Pennsylvania's districts of the United States House of Representatives.

== List of representatives ==
Representative	Party	Years	Cong ress	Note
District established March 4, 1889
James Kerr (Clearfield)	Democrat	March 4, 1889 – March 3, 1891	51st	Elected in 1888. Lost renomination.
George F. Kribbs (Clarion)	Democrat	March 4, 1891 – March 3, 1895	52nd 53rd	Elected in 1890. Re-elected in 1892. Lost renomination.
William C. Arnold (Dubois)	Republican	March 4, 1895 – March 3, 1899	54th 55th	Elected in 1894. Re-elected in 1896; Retired.
James K.P. Hall (Ridgway)	Democrat	March 4, 1899 – November 29, 1902	56th 57th	Elected in 1898. Re-elected in 1900. Resigned after being elected to the Pennsylvania State Senate.
Vacant		November 29, 1902 – March 3, 1903	57th	
Joseph C. Sibley (Franklin)	Republican	March 4, 1903 – March 3, 1907	58th 59th	Redistricted from the 27th district and re-elected in 1902. Re-elected in 1904. Retired.
Nelson P. Wheeler (Endeavor)	Republican	March 4, 1907 – March 3, 1911	60th 61st	Elected in 1906. Re-elected in 1908. Lost renomination in 1910, won election contest, but declined seat.
Peter M. Speer (Oil City)	Republican	March 4, 1911 – March 3, 1913	62nd	Elected in 1910. Lost re-election.
Willis J. Hulings (Oil City)	Progressive	March 4, 1913 – March 3, 1915	63rd	Elected in 1912. Lost re-election.
Samuel H. Miller (Mercer)	Republican	March 4, 1915 – March 3, 1917	64th	Elected in 1914. Declined to be a candidate for renomination.
Orrin D. Bleakley (Franklin)	Republican	March 4, 1917 – April 3, 1917	65th	Resigned having never qualified. The seat then remained vacant.
Vacant		April 4, 1917 – November 5, 1917	65th	
Earl H. Beshlin (Warren)	Democrat	November 6, 1917 – March 3, 1919	65th	Elected to finish vacant term. Lost re-election.
Willis J. Hulings (Oil City)	Republican	March 4, 1919 – March 3, 1921	66th	Elected in 1918; Lost renomination.
Harris J. Bixler (Johnsonburg)	Republican	March 4, 1921 – March 3, 1927	67th 68th 69th	Elected in 1920. Re-elected in 1922. Re-elected in 1924. Lost renomination.
Thomas C. Cochran (Mercer)	Republican	March 4, 1927 – March 3, 1933	70th 71st 72nd	Elected in 1926. Re-elected in 1928. Re-elected in 1930. Redistricted to the 20th district.
William M. Berlin (Greensburg)	Democrat	March 4, 1933 – January 3, 1937	73rd 74th	Elected in 1932. Re-elected in 1934. Lost renomination.
Robert G. Allen (Greensburg)	Democrat	January 3, 1937 – January 3, 1941	75th 76th	Elected in 1936. Re-elected in 1938. Lost renomination.
Augustine B. Kelley (Greensburg)	Democrat	January 3, 1941 – January 3, 1945	77th 78th	Elected in 1940. Re-elected in 1942. Redistricted to the 27th district.
Robert L. Rodgers (Erie)	Republican	January 3, 1945 – January 3, 1947	79th	Redistricted from the 29th district and re-elected in 1944. Lost renomination.
Carroll D. Kearns (Farrell)	Republican	January 3, 1947 – January 3, 1953	80th 81st 82nd	Elected in 1946. Re-elected in 1948. Re-elected in 1950. Redistricted to the 24th district.
Herman P. Eberharter (Pittsburgh)	Democrat	January 3, 1953 – September 9, 1958	83rd 84th 85th	Redistricted from the 32nd district and re-elected in 1952. Re-elected in 1954. Re-elected in 1956. Died.
Vacant		September 9, 1958 – January 3, 1959	85th	
William S. Moorhead (Pittsburgh)	Democrat	January 3, 1959 – January 3, 1963	86th 87th	Elected in 1958. Re-elected in 1960. Redistricted to the 14th district
District dissolved January 3, 1963
