= Nelson P. Wheeler =

American politician

Nelson Platt Wheeler
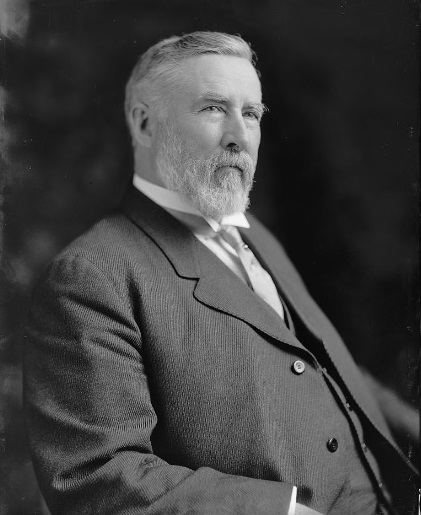

Member of the U.S. House of Representatives from Pennsylvania's 28th district
- In office March 4, 1907 – March 3, 1911
- Preceded by: Joseph C. Sibley
- Succeeded by: Peter Moore Speer

Personal details
- Born: November 4, 1841 Portville, New York, U.S.
- Died: March 3, 1920 (aged 78) Pasadena, California, U.S.
- Party: Republican

Nelson Platt Wheeler (November 4, 1841 – March 3, 1920) was a U.S. representative from the state of Pennsylvania.

== Biography ==
Born in Portville, New York on November 4, 1841, Nelson P. Wheeler was the brother of William E. Wheeler. He attended the public schools and academies in Olean, and Deposit, New York.

He then became a surveyor and civil engineer, and moved to Endeavor, Pennsylvania, where he engaged in the lumber business, agriculture and banking. He was elected as county commissioner in 1866, and then also held various township offices.

Wheeler was member of the Pennsylvania State House of Representatives in 1878 and 1879. He was elected as a Republican to the Sixtieth and Sixty-first Congresses. He was one of 14 representatives, all Republicans, to oppose the Sixteenth Amendment to the United States Constitution, which imposed a federal income tax. He was an unsuccessful candidate for renomination in 1910, but the primary election was contested and his opponent subsequently withdrew and he was tendered the congressional nomination, but declined. He resumed his former business pursuits in Endeavor.

== Later years, death and interment ==
Wheeler moved to Pasadena, California in 1915 due to poor health, and died there on March 3, 1920. He was interred in the Mountain View Cemetery.

== Sources ==
- United States Congress. "Nelson P. Wheeler (id: W000340)". Biographical Directory of the United States Congress.
- The Political Graveyard

U.S. House of Representatives
Preceded by Joseph C. Sibley	Member of the U.S. House of Representatives from Pennsylvania's 28th congressional district 1907 - 1911	Succeeded by Peter M. Speer
