= Denis J. Driscoll =

American politician (1871–1958)

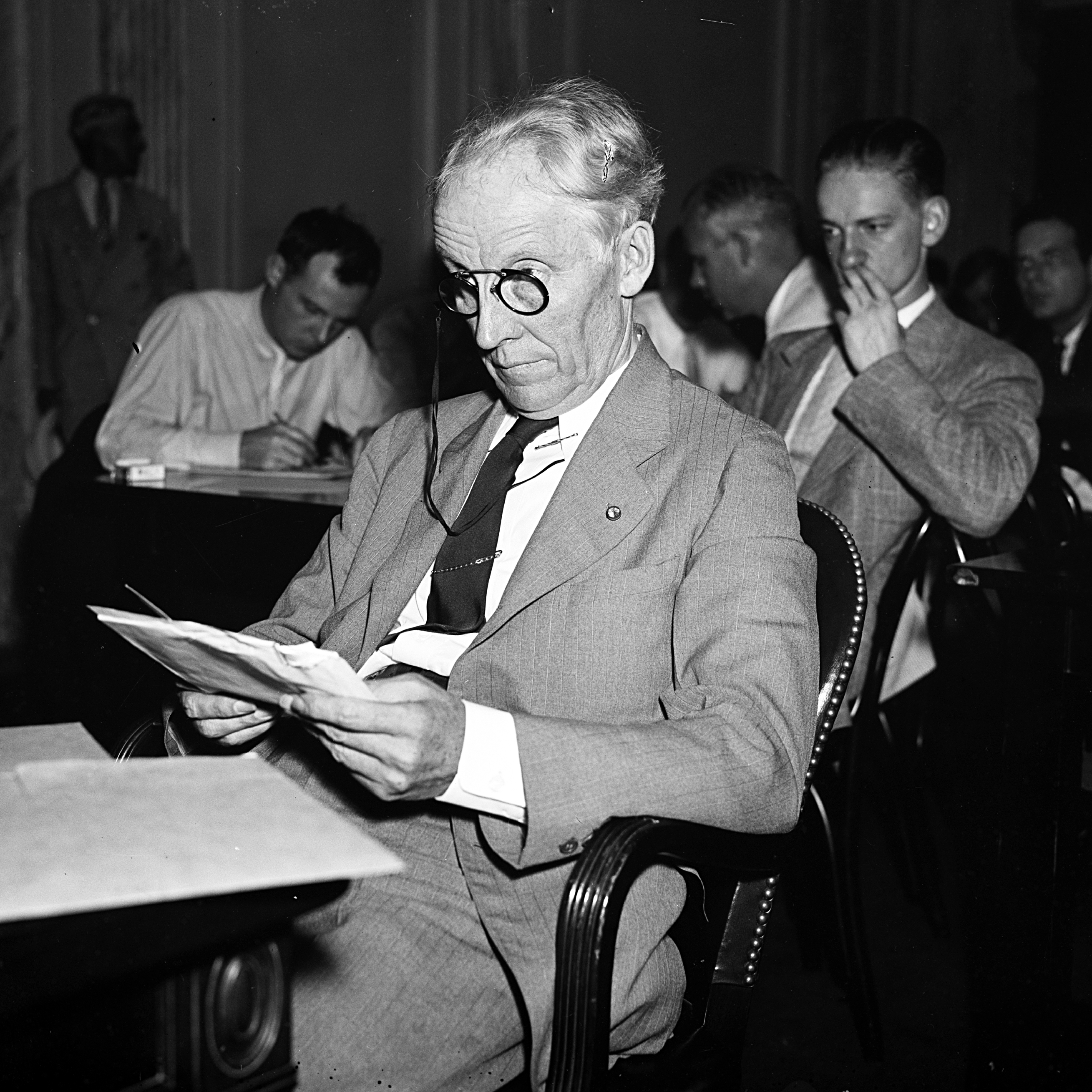
- Driscoll in July 1935

Member of the U.S. House of Representatives from Pennsylvania's 20th district
- In office January 3, 1935 – January 3, 1937
- Preceded by: Thomas Cunningham Cochran
- Succeeded by: Benjamin Jarrett

Personal details
- Born: Denis Joseph Driscoll; March 27, 1871 North Lawrence, New York, U.S.
- Died: January 18, 1958 (aged 86) St. Marys, Pennsylvania, U.S.
- Resting place: St. Mary’s Catholic Cemetery
- Party: Democratic

Denis Joseph Driscoll (March 27, 1871 – January 18, 1958) was an American lawyer, educator, and politician who served as a Democratic Party member of the U.S. House of Representatives from Pennsylvania for one term from 1935 to 1937.

== Early life and education ==
Denis J. Driscoll was born in North Lawrence, New York, United States. He attended the Lawrenceville Academy, and State Teachers' College in Potsdam, New York.

He taught school in Potsdam in 1888 and 1889 and in St. Marys, Pennsylvania, in 1890 and 1891. He was principal of public schools in St. Marys from 1892 to 1897.

== War service ==
Driscoll studied law and was admitted to the bar in 1898, and on the same day enlisted as a private in the Sixteenth Regiment, Pennsylvania National Guard, which on that day had been called for service in the Spanish–American War.

After the war, he commenced the practice of law in St. Marys.

== Political career ==
Driscoll was a member of the Democratic State committee from 1899 to 1922, serving as chairman in 1905. He was the chief burgess of St. Marys from 1903 to 1906. He was also president of St. Marys School Board from 1911 to 1936, and a delegate to the Democratic National Conventions in 1916 and 1920.

He served as United States Attorney for the western district of Pennsylvania in 1920 and 1921.

== Congress and later career ==
Driscoll was elected as a Democrat to the Seventy-fourth Congress. He was an unsuccessful candidate for reelection in 1936.

He was appointed chairman of the Pennsylvania Public Utility Commission for a ten-year term in 1937, and he resigned from this position to accept an appointment in 1940, by the United States District Court for the Southern District of New York, as one of two trustees in the reorganization of the bankrupt Associated Gas and Electric Corporation, and served until August 1946.

== Death ==
Driscoll died in St. Marys, Pennsylvania, and is buried in St. Marys Catholic Cemetery.

U.S. House of Representatives
Preceded by Thomas C. Cochran	Member of the U.S. House of Representatives from Pennsylvania's 20th congressional district 1935–1937	Succeeded by Benjamin Jarrett
