= Peter Moore Speer =

American politician

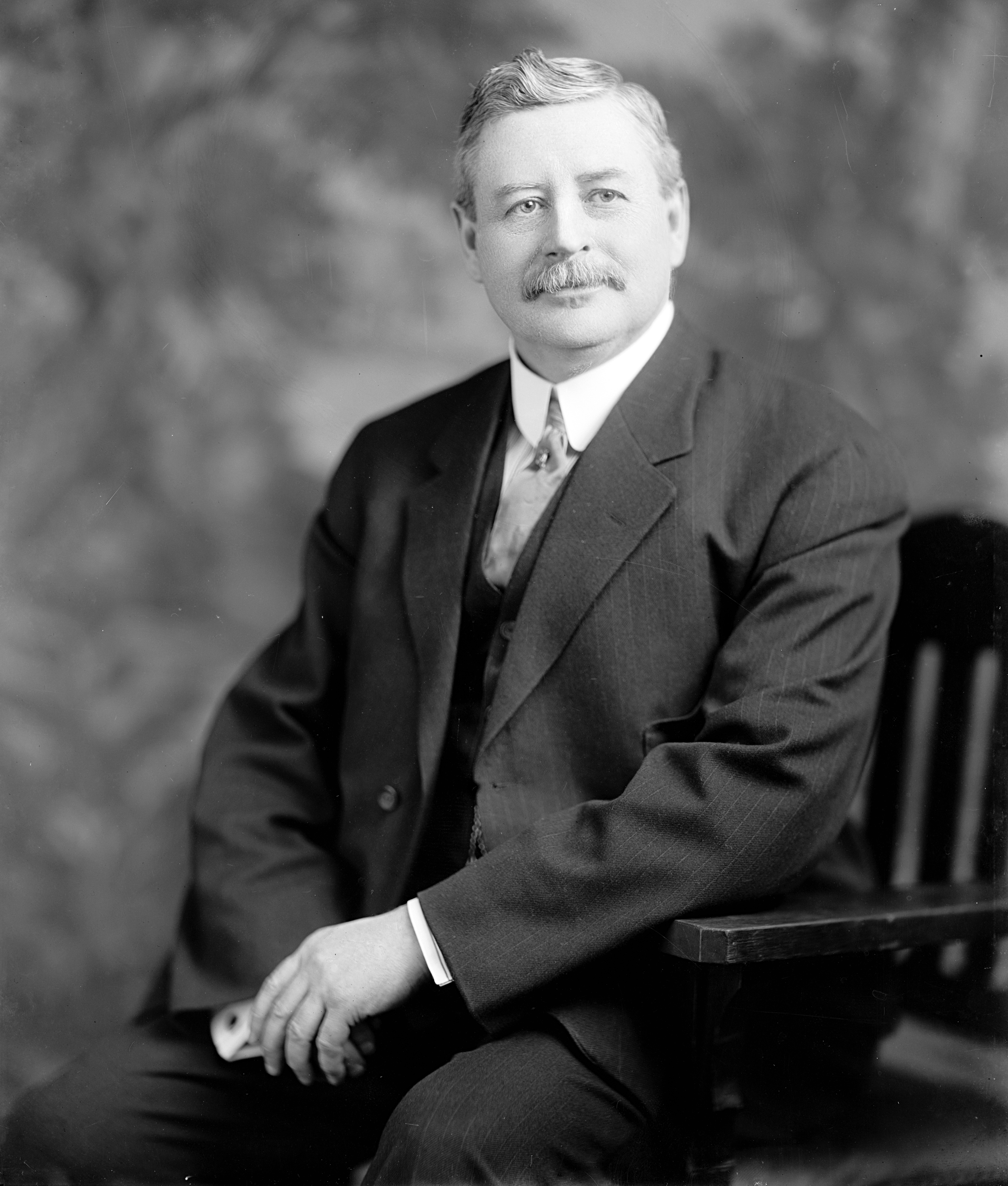

Member of the U.S. House of Representatives from Pennsylvania's 28th district
- In office March 4, 1911 – March 3, 1913

Pennsylvania House of Representatives
- In office 1897–1898

Personal details
- Born: December 29, 1862 Oil City, Pennsylvania, U.S.
- Died: August 3, 1933 (aged 70) New York City, U.S.
- Party: Republican
- Education: Washington and Jefferson College

Peter Moore Speer (December 29, 1862 – August 3, 1933) was a Republican member of the U.S. House of Representatives from Pennsylvania.

Peter M. Speer was born near Oil City, Pennsylvania. He attended Allegheny College in Meadville, Pennsylvania, and the Westminster College in New Wilmington, Pennsylvania. He graduated from Washington and Jefferson College in Washington, Pennsylvania, in 1887. He studied law; was admitted to the bar in 1889 and commenced practice in Oil City. He was district attorney of Venango County from 1891 to 1893. He worked as city solicitor of Oil City from 1895 to 1906. He was a member of the Pennsylvania State House of Representatives in 1897 and 1898.

Speer was elected as a Republican to the Sixty-second Congress. He was an unsuccessful candidate for reelection in 1912. He resumed the practice of law in Oil City. He moved to New York City in 1918 and continued the practice of law. He was the assistant general counsel for the Standard Oil Company from 1918 to 1922, as general counsel and member of the board of directors from 1922 to 1928, and as vice president from 1928 to 1932. He retired from active business pursuits in 1932 and died in New York City in 1933. Interment in Kensico Cemetery, near White Plains, New York.

== Sources ==
- United States Congress. "Peter M. Speer (id: S000712)". Biographical Directory of the United States Congress.
- The Political Graveyard

U.S. House of Representatives
Preceded by Nelson P. Wheeler	Member of the U.S. House of Representatives from Pennsylvania's 28th congressional district 1911 - 1913	Succeeded by Willis J. Hulings
