= Benjamin Jarrett =

American politician

Member of the U.S. House of Representatives from Pennsylvania's 30th district
- In office January 3, 1937 – January 3, 1943
- Preceded by: Denis J. Driscoll
- Succeeded by: Leon H. Gavin

Member of the Pennsylvania House of Representatives
- In office 1911–1913

Personal details
- Born: July 18, 1881 Sharon, Pennsylvania, U.S.
- Died: July 20, 1944 (aged 63) Zanesville, Ohio, U.S.
- Party: Republican

Benjamin Bryant Jarrett (July 18, 1881 – July 20, 1944) was a Republican member of the U.S. House of Representatives from Pennsylvania.

== Biography ==
Benjamin Jarrett was born in Sharon, Pennsylvania. He worked as a telegraph operator and later as foreman in a steel mill. He studied law, was admitted to the bar in 1907 and commenced practice in Farrell, Pennsylvania. He was city solicitor of Farrell from 1910 to 1930. He served in the Pennsylvania State Senate from 1911 to 1913. He was a member of the Pennsylvania State Workmen's Compensation Board from 1919 to 1923. He served as chairman of Mercer County, Pennsylvania, Republican committee.

Jarrett was elected as a Republican in 1937, and served until 1943, meaning he served in the Seventy-fifth, Seventy-sixth, and Seventy-seventh Congresses. He was not a candidate for renomination in 1942. He resumed the practice of law, and died, while on a visit to Zanesville, Ohio. He is buried in Oakwood Cemetery in Sharon, Pennsylvania.

== Sources ==
- United States Congress. "Benjamin Jarrett (id: J000060)". Biographical Directory of the United States Congress.
- The Political Graveyard

U.S. House of Representatives
Preceded by Denis J. Driscoll	Member of the U.S. House of Representatives from Pennsylvania's 30th congressional district 1937–1943	Succeeded by Leon H. Gavin
