= Samuel H. Miller =

American politician (1840–1918)

Samuel Miller
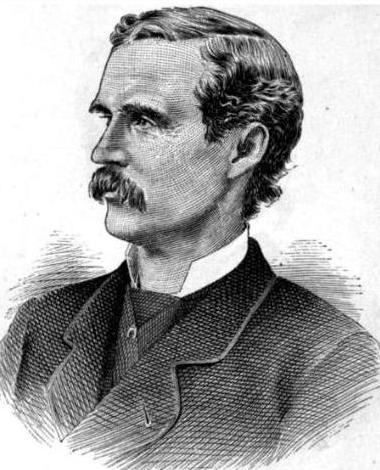
- 1882 portrait of Miller

Member of the U.S. House of Representatives from Pennsylvania's 28th district
- In office March 4, 1915 – March 3, 1917
- Preceded by: Willis James Hulings
- Succeeded by: Orrin Dubbs Bleakley

Member of the U.S. House of Representatives from Pennsylvania's 26th district
- In office March 4, 1881 – March 3, 1885
- Preceded by: Samuel Bernard Dick
- Succeeded by: George Washington Fleeger

Personal details
- Born: April 19, 1840 Coolspring Township, Mercer County, Pennsylvania, US
- Died: September 4, 1918 (aged 78) Mercer, Pennsylvania, US
- Party: Republican

Samuel Henry Miller (April 19, 1840 – September 4, 1918) was an American educator and Civil War veteran who served as a Republican member of the U.S. House of Representatives from Pennsylvania for two terms from 1881 to 1885, and then, thirty years later, for a third term from 1915 to 1917.

== Early life ==
Born in Coolspring Township, Mercer County, Pennsylvania, on April 19, 1840, Miller graduated from Westminster College in New Wilmington, Pennsylvania, in 1860. He taught school.

During the American Civil War, Miller served in the Fifty-fifth Regiment of the Pennsylvania Militia.

== Career ==
Miller edited and published the Mercer Dispatch from 1861 to 1870. He also studied law, was admitted to the bar, and began his legal practice in Mercer in 1871.

=== Congress ===
Miller was elected as a Republican to the Forty-seventh and Forty-eighth Congresses (1881-1885), but declined to be a candidate for renomination in 1884. Between terms, he resumed the practice of law in Mercer and served as president judge of several courts of Mercer County, Pennsylvania from 1894 to 1904. He was then elected to the Sixty-fourth Congress (1915-1917), but declined to be a candidate for renomination in 1916.

== Death and interment ==
Miller died in Mercer, Pennsylvania, on September 4, 1918, aged 78, and was interred at Mercer Citizens Cemetery.

== Sources ==
- United States Congress. "Samuel H. Miller (id: M000753)". Biographical Directory of the United States Congress.
- The Political Graveyard

U.S. House of Representatives
Preceded by Samuel B. Dick	Member of the U.S. House of Representatives from Pennsylvania's 26th congressional district 1881–1885	Succeeded by George W. Fleeger
Preceded by Willis J. Hulings	Member of the U.S. House of Representatives from Pennsylvania's 28th congressional district 1915–1917	Succeeded by Orrin D. Bleakley
