= Robert G. Allen =

American businessperson and politician

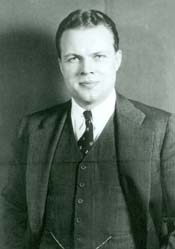

Member of the U.S. House of Representatives from Pennsylvania's 28th district
- In office January 3, 1937 – January 3, 1941
- Preceded by: William M. Berlin
- Succeeded by: Augustine B. Kelley

Personal details
- Born: August 24, 1902 Winchester, Massachusetts, US
- Died: August 9, 1963 (aged 60) Keene, Virginia, US
- Party: Democratic
- Relatives: Warren A. Morton (son-in-law)
- Education: Harvard College

Military service
- Allegiance: United States
- Branch/service: United States Army: Ordnance Corps
- Years of service: 1942 – 1945
- Rank: Major
- Battles/wars: World War II

Robert Gray Allen (August 24, 1902 – August 9, 1963) was an American businessman and a two-term Democratic member of the U.S. House of Representatives from Pennsylvania from 1937 to 1941.

== Early life and education ==
Allen was born in Winchester, Massachusetts, on August 24, 1902. In 1906, he moved to Minneapolis. He was graduated from Phillips Academy at Andover, Massachusetts, in 1922 and later attended Harvard College in Cambridge, Massachusetts. He moved to Greensburg, Pennsylvania in 1929 and was a salesman and sales manager for a valve and fittings manufacturing business until 1937.

== Political and military career ==
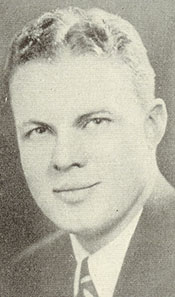
Allen in Congress

He was district administrator of the Works Progress Administration in 1935 and 1936.

Allen was elected as a Democrat to the Seventy-fifth and Seventy-sixth Congresses. He was not a candidate for renomination in 1940. He became president of the Duff-Norton Manufacturing Company in Pittsburgh, from 1940 to 1943. He was commissioned a major in the United States Army Ordnance Corps in July 1942 and was promoted to lieutenant colonel in February 1943. He served until his discharge in January 1945.

After his time in Congress and the Army, he served in a variety of business positions:

- Baldwin Locomotive Works (Sales manager) from 1945 to 1946
- Fisher Plastics Corporation (Vice President) in Boston, Massachusetts from 1946 to 1947
- Great Lakes Carbon Corporation (Vice President) from 1947 to 1954
- Pesco Products (President), a division of Borg-Warner Corporation, from 1954–1957
- Bucyrus-Erie Company (Vice President in 1957 - 1958, and president in 1958)
- Bucyrus-Erie Co. of Canada, Ltd. (chairman of the board and president)
- Ruston-Bucyrus, Ltd., Lincoln, England (chairman of the board)
- Director of the First National Bank of Milwaukee, Wisconsin.

He retired from business activities in 1962 and moved from Milwaukee, to Keene, Virginia, where he died on August 9, 1963, aged 60.

== Family and personal life ==
Allen married Katharine Hancock Wilson on January 17, 1925. Together, they had three children.

U.S. House of Representatives
Preceded by William M. Berlin	Member of the U.S. House of Representatives from Pennsylvania's 28th congressional district 1937–1941	Succeeded by Augustine B. Kelley
