= Willis J. Hulings =

American politician

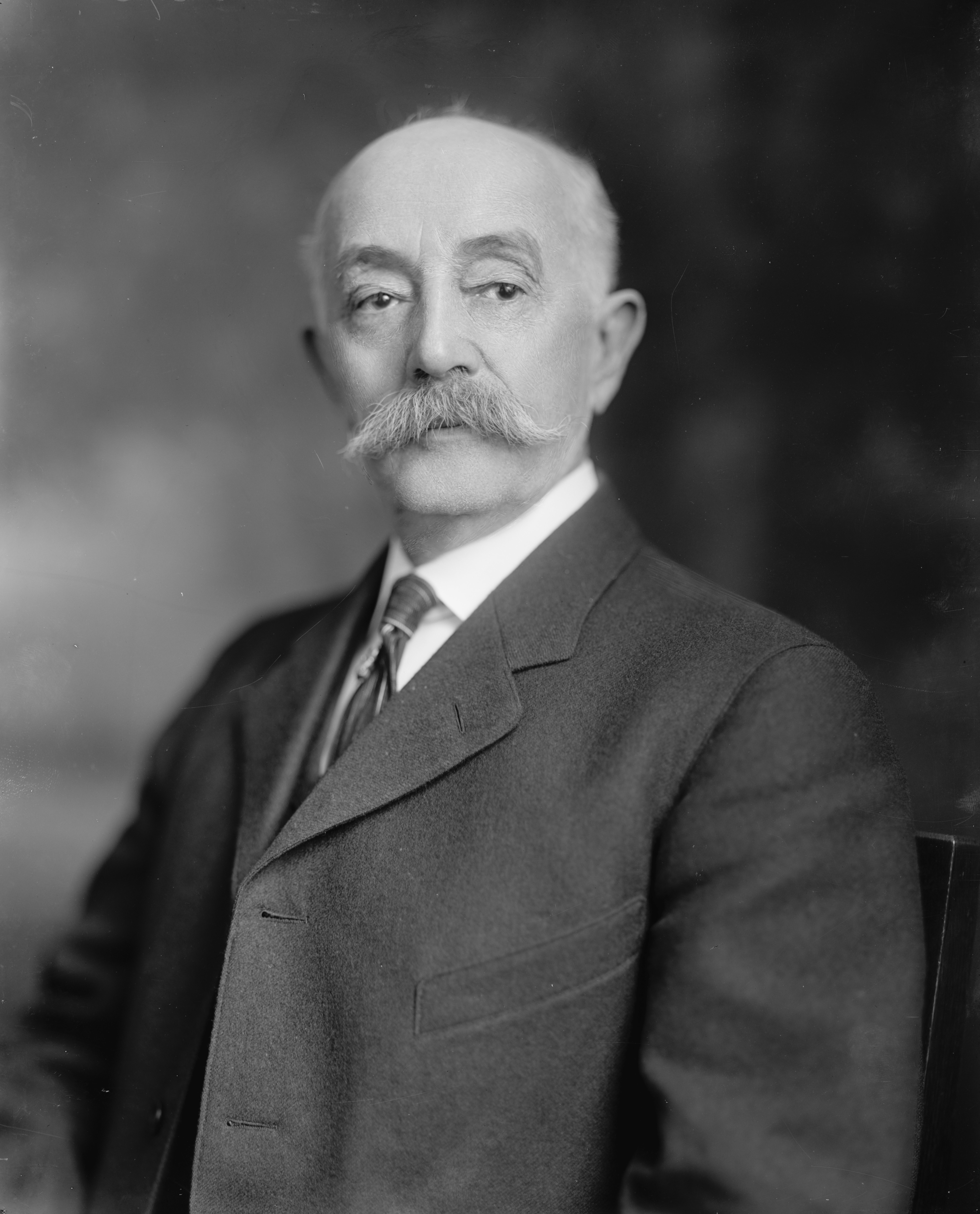

Member of the U.S. House of Representatives from Pennsylvania's 28th district
- In office March 4, 1919 – March 3, 1921
- Preceded by: Earl Hanley Beshlin
- Succeeded by: Harris Jacob Bixler
- In office March 4, 1913 – March 3, 1915
- Preceded by: Peter Moore Speer
- Succeeded by: Samuel Henry Miller

Member of the Pennsylvania Senate
- In office 1906-1910

Member of the Pennsylvania House of Representatives
- In office 1881-1887

Personal details
- Born: July 1, 1850 Rimersburg, Pennsylvania, U.S.
- Died: August 8, 1924 (aged 74) Oil City, Pennsylvania, U.S.
- Party: Progressive; Republican

Willis James Hulings (July 1, 1850 – August 8, 1924) was a Progressive and a Republican member of the U.S. House of Representatives from Pennsylvania.

== Biography ==
Willis J. Hulings was born in Rimersburg, Pennsylvania. He attended the Kittanning Academy. He studied law and was admitted to practice in Pennsylvania, West Virginia, and Arizona. He became a civil engineer and was engaged in mining and the petroleum business.

Hulings was elected as a Republican to the Pennsylvania State House of Representatives and served from 1881 to 1887. He was a member of the Pennsylvania National Guard from 1876 to 1912, serving in the various grades from private to brigadier general. He served as a general in the United States Army during the Spanish–American War. He was a member of the Pennsylvania State Senate from 1906 to 1910. He was elected as a Progressive to the Sixty-third Congress. He was an unsuccessful candidate for reelection in 1914. He was elected as a Republican to the Sixty-sixth Congress, and was an unsuccessful candidate for reelection in 1920. He died in Oil City, Pennsylvania. Interment in Grove Hill Cemetery.

U.S. House of Representatives
Preceded by Peter M. Speer	Member of the U.S. House of Representatives from Pennsylvania's 28th congressional district 1913 - 1915	Succeeded by Samuel H. Miller
Preceded by Earl H. Beshlin	Member of the U.S. House of Representatives from Pennsylvania's 28th congressional district 1919 - 1921	Succeeded by Harris J. Bixler
