= Augustine B. Kelley =

American politician

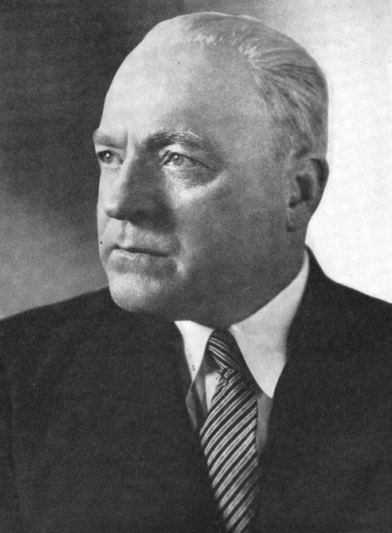

Member of the U.S. House of Representatives from Pennsylvania
- In office January 3, 1941 – November 20, 1957
- Preceded by: Robert G. Allen (28th); Harve Tibbott (27th); James F. Lind (21st)
- Succeeded by: Robert L. Rodgers (28th); James G. Fulton (27th); John H. Dent (21st)
- Constituency: 28th district (1941-45); 27th district (1945-53); 21st district (1953-57)

Personal details
- Born: Augustine Bernard Kelley; July 9, 1883 New Baltimore, Pennsylvania, U.S.
- Died: November 20, 1957 (aged 74) Bethesda, Maryland, U.S.
- Resting place: Arlington National Cemetery
- Party: Democratic
- Education: United States Military Academy at West Point

Augustine Bernard Kelley (July 9, 1883 – November 20, 1957) was an American businessman, military officer, and politician who served as a Democratic member of the U.S. House of Representatives from Pennsylvania from 1941 to 1957.

== Life and career ==
Kelley was born in New Baltimore, Pennsylvania. He attended the United States Military Academy in West Point, New York, in 1904 and 1905, but had to withdraw because of a heart condition. He studied mining engineering with the International Correspondence School from 1907 to 1912. He began his business career in 1905 as a clerk with the Pennsylvania Railroad, and later became superintendent of the H.C. Frick Coke Company. He was also associated with other coke and coal companies. He served as a member of the Greensburg, Pennsylvania, Board of Education in 1935 and 1936.

=== Congress ===
Kelley was elected as a Democrat to the Seventy-seventh and to the eight succeeding Congresses and served until his death. In Congress he served as Chairman of the United States House Committee on Invalid Pensions during the 79th United States Congress.

=== Death and burial ===
He died in Bethesda, Maryland on November 20, 1957 and is interred in Arlington National Cemetery.

== See also ==
- List of members of the United States Congress who died in office (1950–1999)

U.S. House of Representatives
| Preceded by Robert G. Allen | Member of the U.S. House of Representatives from Pennsylvania's 28th congressional district 1941–1945 | Succeeded by Robert L. Rodgers |
| Preceded by Harve Tibbott | Member of the U.S. House of Representatives from Pennsylvania's 27th congressional district 1945–1953 | Succeeded by James G. Fulton |
| Preceded by James F. Lind | Member of the U.S. House of Representatives from Pennsylvania's 21st congressional district 1953–1957 | Succeeded by John H. Dent |
