= Harris J. Bixler =

American politician

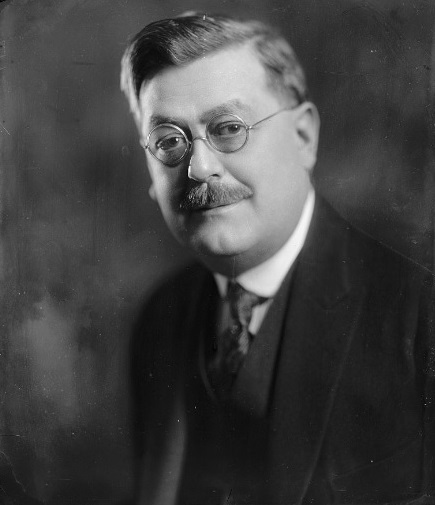

Member of the U.S. House of Representatives from Pennsylvania's 28th district
- In office March 4, 1921 – March 3, 1927
- Preceded by: Willis J. Hulings
- Succeeded by: Thomas C. Cochran

Personal details
- Born: Harris Jacob Bixler; September 16, 1870 New Buffalo, Pennsylvania, U.S.
- Died: April 29, 1941 (aged 70)
- Resting place: Duncannon Cemetery in Duncannon, Pennsylvania
- Party: Republican

Harris Jacob Bixler (September 16, 1870 – March 29, 1941) was a Republican member of the U.S. House of Representatives from Pennsylvania for three terms from 1921 to 1927.

== Early life and career ==
Harris J. Bixler was born in New Buffalo, Pennsylvania. He attended Lock Haven State Normal School. He taught school in the country districts in Perry and Clinton Counties from 1878 to 1892. He attended Potts Business College in Williamsport, Pennsylvania.

=== Business ===
He moved to Johnsonburg, Pennsylvania, in 1892 and worked as a shipping clerk. He was later engaged in banking and manufacturing, and served as director of the Johnsonburg National Bank.

=== Early political career ===
He served as president of the city council from 1900 to 1904 and as president of the board of education from 1904 to 1910. He was mayor of Johnsonburg from 1908 to 1912, and sheriff of Elk County, Pennsylvania, from 1916 to 1920. He served as chairman of the Republican county committee from 1916 to 1925, and as a treasurer of Elk County from 1920 to 1922.

== Congress ==
In 1920, Bixler was elected as a Republican to the Sixty-seventh, Sixty-eighth, and Sixty-ninth Congresses. He was an unsuccessful candidate for renomination in 1926.

== Later career and death ==
He was engaged in business as a freight contractor and also interested in agricultural pursuits. He died in Johnsonburg. Interment in Duncannon Cemetery in Duncannon, Pennsylvania.

== Sources ==
- United States Congress. "Harris J. Bixler (id: B000493)". Biographical Directory of the United States Congress.
- The Political Graveyard

U.S. House of Representatives
Preceded by Willis J. Hulings	Member of the U.S. House of Representatives from Pennsylvania's 28th congressional district 1921 - 1927	Succeeded by Thomas C. Cochran
