= Thomas Cunningham Cochran =

American lawyer and politician

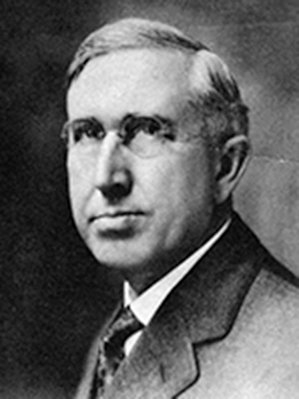

Member of the U.S. House of Representatives from Pennsylvania
- In office March 4, 1927 – January 3, 1935
- Preceded by: Harris J. Bixler
- Succeeded by: Denis J. Driscoll
- Constituency: 28th district (1927–1933); 20th district (1933–1935)

Personal details
- Born: November 30, 1877 Sandy Creek Township, Pennsylvania, U.S.
- Died: December 10, 1957 (aged 80)
- Party: Republican

Thomas Cunningham Cochran (November 30, 1877 – December 10, 1957) was an American lawyer and Republican member of the U.S. House of Representatives from Pennsylvania for four terms from 1927 to 1935.

== Early life and career ==
Thomas C. Cochran was born in Sandy Creek Township, Pennsylvania (near Sheakleyville, Pennsylvania). He moved with his parents to Mercer, Pennsylvania, in 1879. He graduated from the Mercer High School in 1896 and from Westminster College in New Wilmington, Pennsylvania, in 1901. He was a member of the Sigma Phi Epsilon fraternity. He was a member of the faculty of Mercer Academy in 1902 and 1903. He studied law, and was admitted to the bar in 1903. He commenced practice in Mercer, Pennsylvania. He was district attorney of Mercer County, Pennsylvania, from 1906 to 1909. He was a trustee of Westminster College.

== Congress ==
Cochran was elected as a Republican to the Seventieth and to the three succeeding Congresses. He was not a candidate for renomination in 1934.

== Later career and death ==
After his time in Congress, he served as a delegate to the Inter-Parliamentary Union Conferences in Paris, France, in 1927, Berlin, Germany, in 1928, Geneva, Switzerland, in 1929, London, England, in 1930, and Istanbul, Turkey, in 1934, and as an observer in Oslo, Norway, in 1939, Istanbul in 1951, and Washington, D.C. in 1953.

He resumed the practice of law, and died in Mercer. Interment in Mercer Citizens Cemetery.

== Sources ==
- United States Congress. "Thomas C. Cochran (id: C000566)". Biographical Directory of the United States Congress.
- The Political Graveyard

U.S. House of Representatives
Preceded by Harris J. Bixler	Member of the U.S. House of Representatives from Pennsylvania's 28th congressional district 1927–1933	Succeeded by William M. Berlin
Preceded by Howard W. Stull	Member of the U.S. House of Representatives from Pennsylvania's 20th congressional district 1933–1935	Succeeded by Denis J. Driscoll
