= New Buffalo, Pennsylvania =

Borough in Pennsylvania, US

- Borough
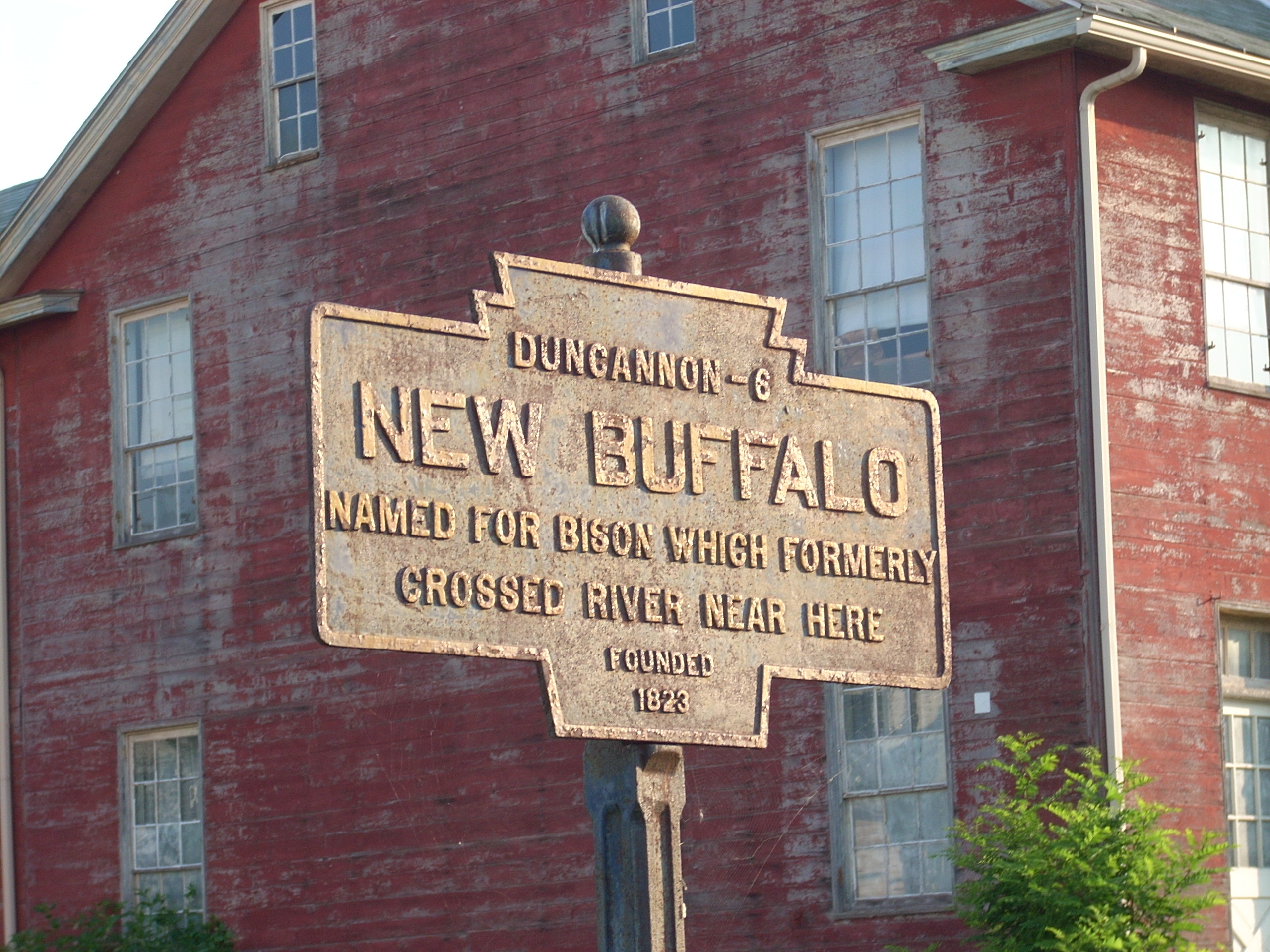
- Keystone Marker

- Location of New Buffalo in Perry County, Pennsylvania.

- Location within Pennsylvania Location within the United States
- Coordinates: 40°27′15″N 76°58′12″W
- Country: United States
- State: Pennsylvania
- County: Perry
- Settled: 1800
- Incorporated: 1848

Area
  - Total: 0.058 sq mi (0.15 km^{2})
  - Land: 0.058 sq mi (0.15 km^{2})
  - Water: 0 sq mi (0.00 km^{2})
- Elevation (center of borough by church): 370 ft (110 m)
- Highest elevation (northeast borough boundary): 440 ft (130 m)
- Lowest elevation (Susquehanna River): 360 ft (110 m)

Population (2020)
  - Total: 124
  - Density: 2,094.8/sq mi (808.79/km^{2})
- Time zone: UTC-5 (Eastern (EST))
  - Summer (DST): UTC-4 (EDT)
- Zip code: 17069
- Area code: 717
- FIPS code: 42-53320
- Website: https://newbuffaloboro.org/

New Buffalo is a borough in Perry County, Pennsylvania, United States. The population was 124 at the time of the 2020 census.

It is part of the Harrisburg metropolitan area.

== Geography ==
According to the United States Census Bureau, the borough has a total area of 0.1 square mile (0.2 km^{2}), all of it land.

== Demographics ==
Historical population
Census	Pop.	Note	%±
1870	259		—
1880	222		−14.3%
1890	220		−0.9%
1900	171		−22.3%
1910	135		−21.1%
1920	93		−31.1%
1930	97		4.3%
1940	101		4.1%
1950	155		53.5%
1960	153		−1.3%
1970	150		−2.0%
1980	156		4.0%
1990	145		−7.1%
2000	123		−15.2%
2010	129		4.9%
2020	124		−3.9%
2021 (est.)	124	Steady	0.0%

As of the census of 2000, there were 123 people, 57 households, and 36 families residing in the borough.

The population density was 1,843.5 inhabitants per square mile (711.8/km^{2}). There were 59 housing units at an average density of 884.3 per square mile (341.4/km^{2}).

The racial makeup of the borough was 95.12% White, 2.44% African American, 0.81% Asian, and 1.63% from two or more races.

There were 57 households, out of which 19.3% had children under the age of eighteen living with them; 40.4% were married couples living together, 15.8% had a female householder with no husband present, and 36.8% were non-families. 33.3% of all households were made up of individuals, and 12.3% had someone living alone who was sixty-five years of age or older.

The average household size was 2.16 and the average family size was 2.72.

In the borough the population was spread out, with 17.9% under the age of eighteen, 8.9% from eighteen to twenty-four, 22.0% from twenty-five to forty-four, 38.2% from forty-five to sixty-four, and 13.0% who were sixty-five years of age or older. The median age was forty-six years.

For every one hundred females, there were 92.2 males. For every one hundred females aged eighteen and over, there were 98.0 males.

The median income for a household in the borough was $31,250, and the median income for a family was $28,750. Males had a median income of $31,250 compared with that of $23,750 for females.

The per capita income for the borough was $17,276. There were 20.6% of families and 22.0% of the population living below the poverty line, including 50.0% of those who were under the age of eighteen. None of those were over the age of sixty-four.
