= William M. Berlin =

American politician

Member of the U.S. House of Representatives from Pennsylvania's 28th district
- In office March 4, 1933 – January 3, 1937
- Preceded by: Thomas C. Cochran
- Succeeded by: Robert G. Allen

Personal details
- Born: William Markle Berlin; March 29, 1880 Delmont, Pennsylvania, U.S.
- Died: October 14, 1962 (aged 82)
- Party: Democratic

William Markle Berlin (March 29, 1880 – October 14, 1962) was an American businessman and politician who served as a Democratic member of the U.S. House of Representatives from Pennsylvania for two terms from 1933 to 1937.

== Life and career ==
William M. Berlin was born on a farm near Delmont, Pennsylvania. He graduated from Laird Institute at Murrysville, Pennsylvania, in 1896, and moved to Greensburg, Pennsylvania, in 1916.

He was engaged as an automobile distributor, in the wholesale oil and gas business, and in coal mining.

=== Political career ===
He was chairman of the Democratic County Committee in 1916.

In 1932, Berlin was elected as a Democrat to the Seventy-third and Seventy-fourth Congresses. He was an unsuccessful candidate for renomination in 1936.

After his time in Congress, he served as clerk of the court of Westmoreland County, Pennsylvania, from 1937 to 1941.

=== Later career and death ===
He resumed the mining of coal in Pennsylvania and West Virginia in 1941. He was a delegate to the 1944 Democratic National Convention in Chicago, and an unsuccessful candidate for the Republican congressional nomination in 1950.

He served as assistant librarian of the United States House of Representatives from February 1, 1957, until 1961 when promoted to librarian, and served in that capacity until his death in Greensburg, Pennsylvania.

== Sources ==
- United States Congress. "William M. Berlin (id: B000409)". Biographical Directory of the United States Congress.
- The Political Graveyard

U.S. House of Representatives
Preceded by Thomas C. Cochran	Member of the U.S. House of Representatives from Pennsylvania's 28th congressional district 1933–1937	Succeeded by Robert G. Allen
