= Earl Hanley Beshlin =

American politician

Earl H. Beshlin
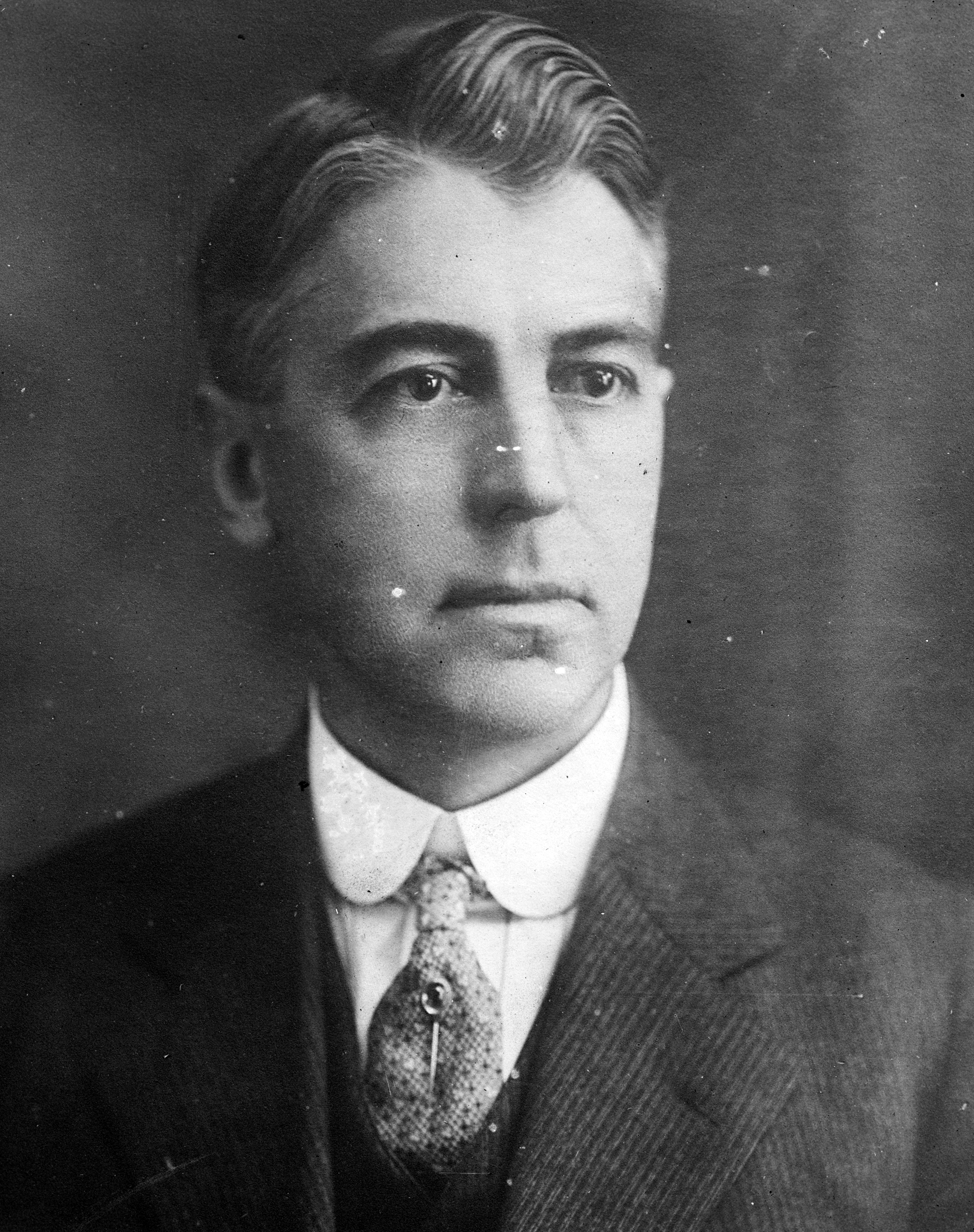

Member of the U.S. House of Representatives from Pennsylvania's 28th district
- In office November 6, 1917 – March 3, 1919
- Preceded by: Orrin D. Bleakley
- Succeeded by: Willis J. Hulings

Personal details
- Born: Earl Hanley Beshlin; April 28, 1870 Conewango Township, Pennsylvania, U.S.
- Died: July 12, 1971 (aged 101) Warren, Pennsylvania, U.S.
- Party: Democratic

Earl Hanley Beshlin (April 28, 1870 – July 12, 1971) was an American lawyer, businessman, and politician who served one term as a Democratic member of the U.S. House of Representatives from Pennsylvania from 1917 to 1919.

== Early life and career ==
Earl H. Beshlin was born in Conewango Township, Pennsylvania. He graduated from Warren High School in Warren, Pennsylvania. He became a lawyer and engaged in private practice. He was elected Burgess of Warren County, Pennsylvania, from 1906 to 1909. He served as borough solicitor of Warren County from 1914 to 1918.

== Congress ==
Beshlin elected as a Democrat and Prohibitionist to the Sixty-fifth Congress, by special election, to fill the vacancy caused by the resignation of United States Representative Orrin D. Bleakley. Beshlin's Republican opponent in the 1917 special election, Captain Ulysses Grant Lyons, was actually declared the winner erroneously on November 7, 1917, by the New York Times. Beshlin was an unsuccessful candidate for reelection in 1918.

== Later career and death ==
Beshlin was a member and later chairman of the Board of Education of Warren County from 1919 to 1935. He was also a hospital executive.

Beshlin died in 1971, at the age of 101, in Warren, Pennsylvania and is interred in Oakland Mausoleum.

== Sources ==
- United States Congress. "Earl H. Beshlin (id: B000421)". Biographical Directory of the United States Congress.
- The Political Graveyard

U.S. House of Representatives
Preceded by Orrin D. Bleakley	Member of the U.S. House of Representatives from Pennsylvania's 28th congressional district 1917 - 1919	Succeeded by Willis J. Hulings
