= Orrin Dubbs Bleakley =

American businessman and politician

Orrin D. Bleakly
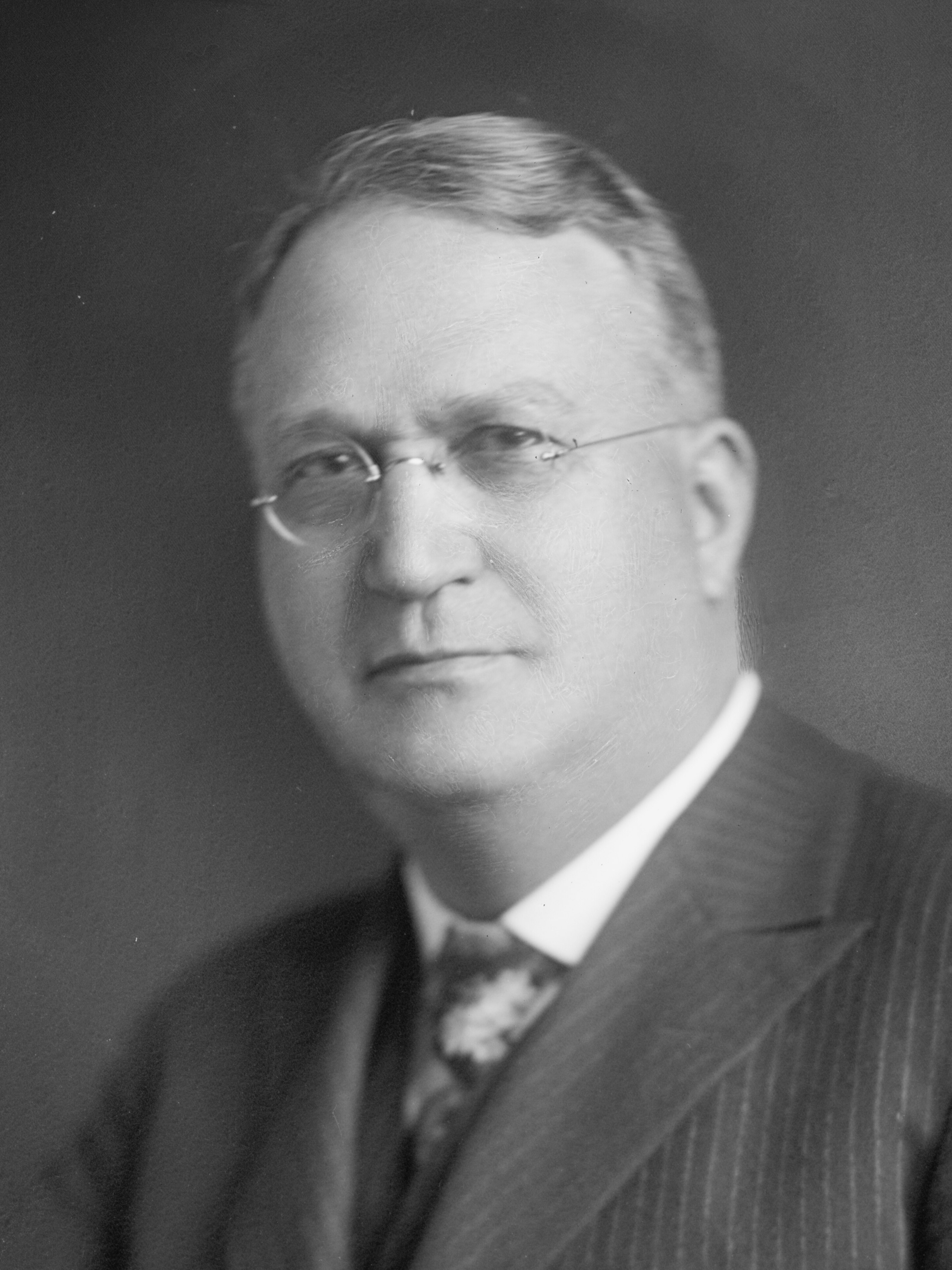

Member of the U.S. House of Representatives from Pennsylvania's 28th district
- In office March 4, 1917 – April 3, 1917
- Preceded by: Samuel H. Miller
- Succeeded by: Earl H. Beshlin

Personal details
- Born: Orrin Dubbs Bleakley; May 5, 1854 Franklin, Pennsylvania, U.S.
- Died: December 3, 1927 (aged 73)
- Resting place: Franklin Cemetery in Franklin, Pennsylvania
- Party: Republican

Orrin Dubbs Bleakley (May 5, 1854 – December 3, 1927) was an American businessman and politician who served as a Republican member of the U.S. House of Representatives from Pennsylvania for one month in 1917. He resigned his seat after a conviction for campaign finance improprieties.

== Early life and career ==
Bleakley was born on May 5, 1854, in Franklin, Pennsylvania. He attended the University of Bonn, in Prussia. He was engaged in banking with his father until 1876. He became interested in the production of oil and worked in the industry from 1876 to 1883. He organized the Franklin Trust Company in 1883, and became its president. He was a delegate at large to the Republican National Convention in 1904, and served as chairman of the Venango County Republican committee.

Upon his election to Congress in November 1916, Bleakley became the first government official to fly from his home state to DC. The trip was made in a 75-horsepower Curtiss biplane from Philadelphia, piloted by Sergeant William C. Ocker, on leave from the United States Aviation Corps at the time. The trip took 3:15 hours, including an unscheduled stop in a wheatfield in Maryland.

== Congress and later career ==
Bleakley was elected as a Republican to the Sixty-fifth Congress and served from March 4 to April 3, 1917, when he resigned without having qualified. His resignation came after he was convicted and fined under the Federal Corrupt Practices Act. Bleakley's offense—he had spent more than the allotted $5,000 on his campaign.

He resumed banking in Franklin.

== Death and burial ==
He died in Robinson, Illinois, on December 3, 1927. Interment in Franklin Cemetery in Franklin, Pennsylvania.

== Sources ==
- United States Congress. "Orrin D. Bleakley (id: B000552)". Biographical Directory of the United States Congress.
- The Political Graveyard
- Venango County Historical Society. Venango County 2000: The Changing Scene. VCHS, Franklin. 2000.

U.S. House of Representatives
Preceded by Samuel H. Miller	Member of the U.S. House of Representatives from Pennsylvania's 28th congressional district 1917	Succeeded by Earl H. Beshlin
