= Stineman =

Stineman is a surname. Notable people with the surname include:

- Galadriel Stineman (fl. 2009), American actress and model
- Jacob C. Stineman (1842–1913), American politician from Pennsylvania
- Washington Irving Stineman (1869–1947), American politician from Pennsylvania
