= Senator Stineman =

Senator Stineman may refer to:

- Jacob C. Stineman (1842–1913), Pennsylvania State Senate
- Washington Irving Stineman (1869–1947), Pennsylvania State Senate

== See also ==
- Senator Stine (disambiguation)
