= George M. Wertz =

American politician

George Wertz
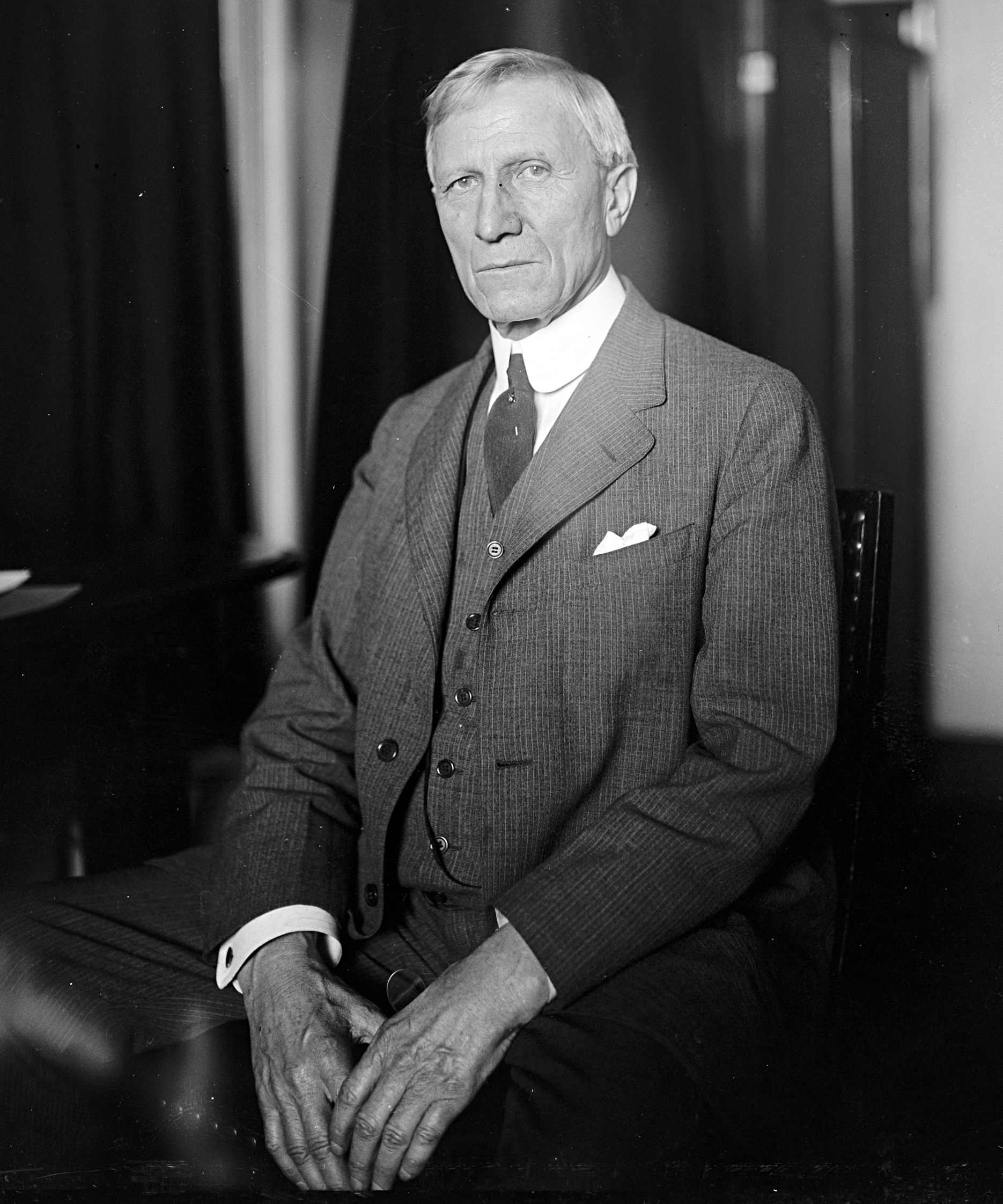

Member of the U.S. House of Representatives from Pennsylvania's 20th district
- In office March 4, 1923 – March 3, 1925
- Preceded by: Edward Brooks
- Succeeded by: Anderson Walters

President pro tempore of the Pennsylvania Senate
- In office May 25, 1911 – January 7, 1913
- Preceded by: William Crow
- Succeeded by: Daniel Gerberich

Member of the Pennsylvania Senate from the 35th district
- In office January 5, 1909 – January 7, 1913
- Preceded by: Jacob C. Stineman
- Succeeded by: Jacob C. Stineman

Personal details
- Born: July 19, 1856 Johnstown, Pennsylvania, U.S.
- Died: November 19, 1928 (aged 72) Johnstown, Pennsylvania, U.S.
- Party: Republican
- Spouse: Louisa Glitch

George M. Wertz (July 19, 1856 – November 19, 1928) was a Republican politician, teacher and publisher from Pennsylvania.

== Formative years and family ==
George Munson Wertz was born near Johnstown, Pennsylvania on July 19, 1856. He attended the public schools, Ebensburg Academy and the National Normal School in Lebanon, Ohio.

His father, German-Dunkard Jacob Wertz, an ardent Republican and abolitionist, was the great grandson of a 1735 Palatine immigrant and rose to prominence as a farmer.

His daughter Ada Olive Hager (née Wertz) attended Vassar, graduating in 1908. She was one of the original graveyard suffragettes.

== Career ==
A teacher in his community's public school system from 1876 to 1884, George M. Wertz was elected as a Republican member of the Board of School Directors in 1890. As he progressed in his political career, he became chair of his county's Republican Party committee.

In 1893, Wertz began a three-year term as Cambria County commissioner, and in November 1897, Cambria County sheriff, a position he held until 1901. Through the influence of his iron manufacturer father-in-law, Wertz assumed a post as manager of the Cambria Steel Company, where his accomplishments included securing options for control of the Manufacturer's Water Company, Somerset County.

A member of the Pennsylvania State Senate from 1909 to 1913, he served as the body's President pro tempore from 1911 to 1913.

Wertz later organized and ran the Johnstown Daily Leader from 1911 to 1917, creating Cambria County's first afternoon newspaper. He was also an ardent farmer and fruit grower.

Wertz was elected to the Sixty-eighth Congress, but was defeated in the 1924 Republican primary.

He belonged to the Evangelical Lutheran Church; the Summit Lodge Masons; the Johnstown School of Instruction – Masons; and was knighted by the Oriental Commandery, No. 61, Knights Templar.

== Death and interment ==
Wertz sold real estate until his death in Johnstown on November 19, 1928. He was interred in the Grandview Cemetery, Johnstown.

U.S. House of Representatives
Preceded by Edward Brooks	Member of the U.S. House of Representatives from Pennsylvania's 20th congressional district 1923–1925	Succeeded by Anderson Walters
Political offices
Preceded by William Crow	President pro tempore of the Pennsylvania Senate; 1911–1913	Succeeded by Daniel Gerberich
Pennsylvania State Senate
Preceded by Jacob C. Stineman	Member of the Pennsylvania Senate for the 35th district 1909–1913	Succeeded by Jacob C. Stineman
