= Amos Myers =

American politician

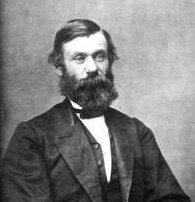

Member of the U.S. House of Representatives from Pennsylvania's 20th district
- In office March 4, 1863 – March 3, 1865
- Preceded by: Jesse Lazear
- Succeeded by: Charles Vernon Culver

Personal details
- Born: April 23, 1824 Petersburg, Pennsylvania, U.S.
- Died: October 18, 1893 (aged 69) East Carlton, New York, U.S.
- Resting place: Crown Hill Cemetery and Arboretum, Section 38, Lot 308, indianapolis, indiana
- Party: Republican
- Education: Allegheny College
- Profession: Politician, lawyer

Amos Myers (April 23, 1824 – October 18, 1893) was a Republican member of the U.S. House of Representatives from Pennsylvania.

Myers was born in Petersburg (now East Petersburg), Pennsylvania, on April 23, 1824. He attended a private school near Clarion, Pennsylvania, and in 1843 graduated from Allegheny College in Meadville, Pennsylvania. He studied law, was admitted to the bar in 1846 and commenced practice in Clarion. He held several local offices, and was appointed district attorney of Clarion County, Pennsylvania in 1847.

Myers was elected as a Republican to the Thirty-eighth Congress (March 4, 1863 – March 3, 1865). He served as chairman of the United States House Committee on Expenditures in the Department of the Treasury during the Thirty-eighth Congress. He resumed the practice of law in Clarion. He moved to Kentucky and was ordained to the Baptist ministry. He preached in Kentucky, Pennsylvania, and New York, and died in East Carlton (now Kent), New York, on October 18, 1893. Interment in Crown Hill Cemetery in Indianapolis, Indiana.

== Sources ==
- United States Congress. "Amos Myers (id: M001126)". Biographical Directory of the United States Congress.
- Amos Myers at The Political Graveyard

U.S. House of Representatives
Preceded by Jesse Lazear	Member of the U.S. House of Representatives from Pennsylvania's 20th congressional district 1863–1865	Succeeded by Charles V. Culver
