= Langhorne Wister =

American military officer (1834–1891)

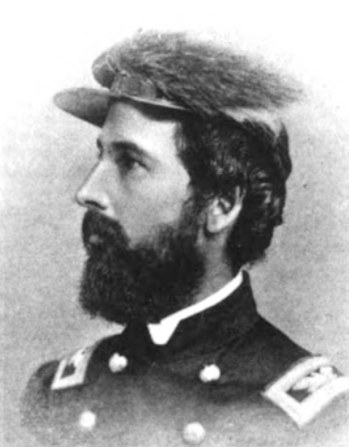
- Born: September 20, 1834; Philadelphia, Pennsylvania, U.S.
- Died: March 19, 1891 (aged 56); Philadelphia, Pennsylvania, U.S.
- Burial place: Laurel Hill Cemetery, Philadelphia, Pennsylvania, U.S.
- Military career
- Allegiance: United States
- Branch: Union army
- Service years: 1861–1864
- Rank: Colonel
- Commands: 13th Pennsylvania Reserve Regiment; 150th Pennsylvania Infantry Regiment
- Conflicts: American Civil War; Battle of Dranesville; Battle of Beaver Dam Creek; Battle of Glendale; Battle of Gaines' Mill (WIA); Battle of Fredericksburg; Battle of Chancellorsville; Battle of Gettysburg (WIA)

Langhorne Wesley Wister (September 20, 1834 – March 19, 1891) was an American military officer who served in the Union army during the American Civil War. He raised a company and served as captain of the 13th Pennsylvania Reserve Regiment. He was promoted to colonel of the 150th Pennsylvania Infantry Regiment, fought in some of the key battles of the eastern theater, and was wounded in action twice. He was brevetted brigadier general after the war in recognition of his service.

== Early life and education ==
Wister was born at Belfield, the Wister family estate, in the Germantown neighborhood of Philadelphia, Pennsylvania, on September 20, 1834. His father, William Wister, was treasurer of the North Pennsylvania Railroad. Langhorne was educated at Germantown Academy and moved to Duncannon, Pennsylvania, after graduation to work at the Duncannon Iron Company as chief accountant.

== Career ==
He volunteered in the Union Army and personally raised a company from Duncannon. He was mustered on June 4, 1861, and served as captain in the 13th Pennsylvania Reserve Regiment, known as the "Bucktails", under Charles John Biddle. He fought at the Battle of Dranesville, the Battle of Beaver Dam Creek, and the Battle of Glendale. He was wounded in the ankle at the Battle of Gaines' Mill.

At the end of the Peninsula campaign, he was stationed in Philadelphia on recruiting duty, but was quickly recalled into active service. He was promoted to colonel on September 4, 1862, and commanded the 150th Pennsylvania Infantry Regiment, known as the "Third Bucktails". He fought at the Battle of Fredericksburg and at the Battle of Chancellorsville in I Corps of the Army of the Potomac.

Wister assumed command of a brigade on the first day of the Battle of Gettysburg after Colonel Roy Stone was wounded. Wister was wounded in the face and had to give up command, however, he remained on the field of battle to motivate the troops. He took a leave of absence to recover from his wound and returned to lead the brigade. He resigned on February 22, 1864. He was brevetted brigadier general of volunteers, to rank from March 13, 1865, for his service at Fredericksburg, Chancellorsville and Gettysburg.

He returned to Duncannon, resumed work at the iron business, and became a partner in L. & R. Wister & Co., an iron commission merchant. He owned a 280-acre farm in Perry County, Pennsylvania. He was a member of the Military Order of the Loyal Legion of the United States.

Wister died of meningitis at home in Germantown on March 19, 1891, and was interred at Laurel Hill Cemetery in Section L, Lot 316-318.

== See also ==
- List of American Civil War brevet generals (Union)
