= Seth H. Yocum =

American politician (1834–1895)

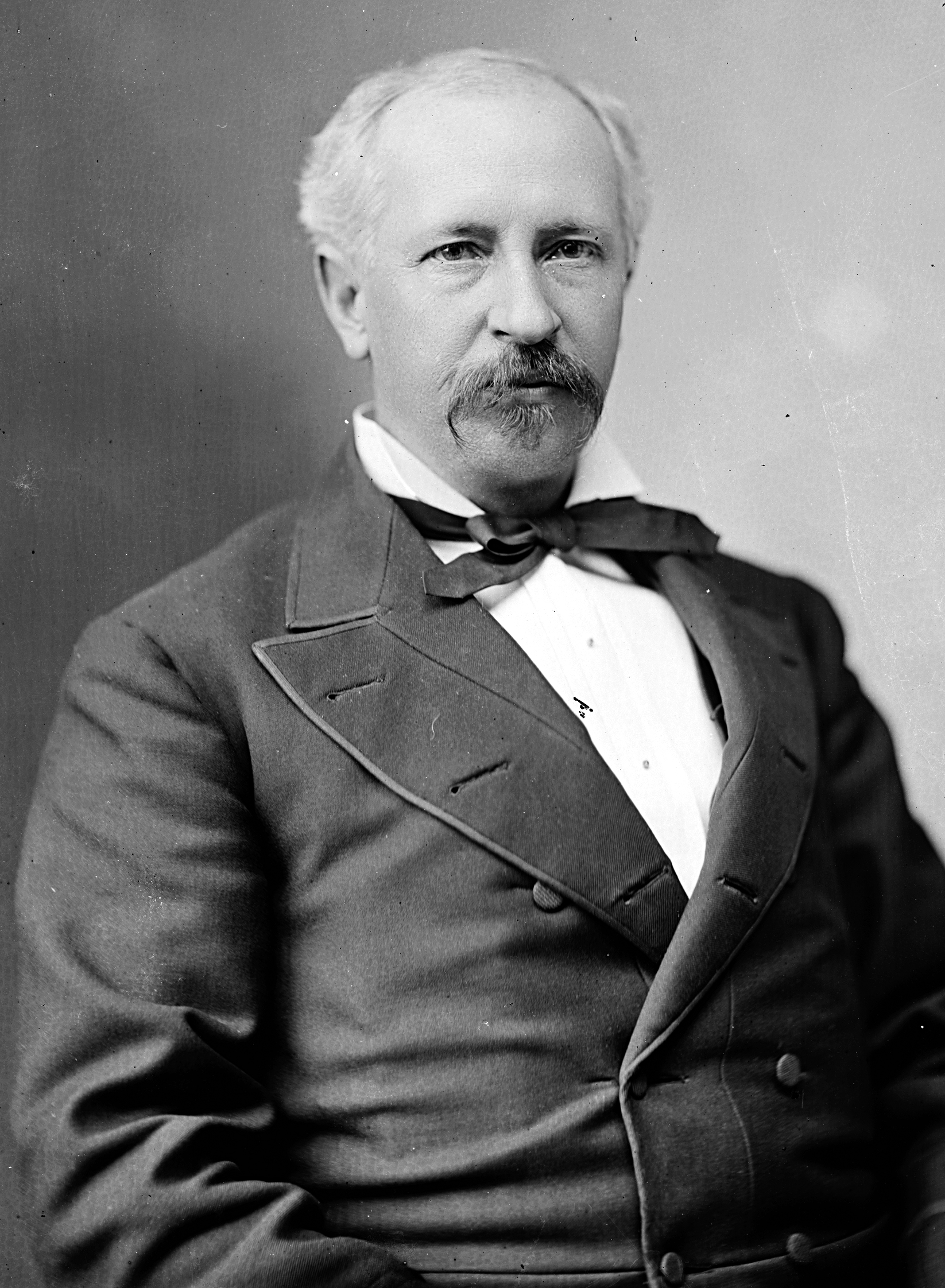

Member of the U.S. House of Representatives from Pennsylvania's 20th district
- In office March 4, 1879 – March 3, 1881
- Preceded by: Levi A. Mackey
- Succeeded by: Andrew Gregg Curtin

Personal details
- Born: August 2, 1834 Catawissa, Pennsylvania
- Died: April 19, 1895 (aged 60) Santa Monica, California
- Party: Greenback
- Education: Dickinson College
- Occupation: Attorney, businessman

Military service
- Allegiance: United States of America
- Branch/service: Union Army

Seth Hartman Yocum (August 2, 1834 – April 19, 1895) was a Greenback member of the U.S. House of Representatives from Pennsylvania.

Seth H. Yocum was born in Catawissa, Pennsylvania. After attending rural schools, he went to Philadelphia in 1850 and learned the printer's trade. Yocum also taught school for several years, and graduated from Dickinson College in 1860, where he was a member of Phi Kappa Psi. During the American Civil War, Yocum entered the Union Army as a private and was promoted to the first lieutenant of the Fifth Pennsylvania Cavalry. He studied law, was admitted to the Schuylkill County, Pennsylvania bar in 1865 and commenced practice in Ashland, Pennsylvania. He moved to Bellefonte, Pennsylvania in 1873 and continued the practice of law, serving as district attorney of Centre County, Pennsylvania from 1875 to 1879.

Yocum was elected as a Greenbacker to the Forty-sixth Congress in the 1878 election, but was not a candidate for renomination in 1880. He moved to Johnson City, Tennessee, and engaged in the tanning business. He was elected mayor of Johnson City in 1885. After this, Yocum moved to Pasadena, California, and began growing oranges commercially. He died in Santa Monica, California in 1895 and was interred in Mountain View Cemetery in Pasadena.

== See also ==
- List of mayors of Johnson City, Tennessee

U.S. House of Representatives
Preceded by Levi A. Mackey	Member of the U.S. House of Representatives from Pennsylvania's 20th congressional district March 4, 1879 – March 3, 1881	Succeeded by Andrew Gregg Curtin
