= John Dickey (American politician) =

American politician

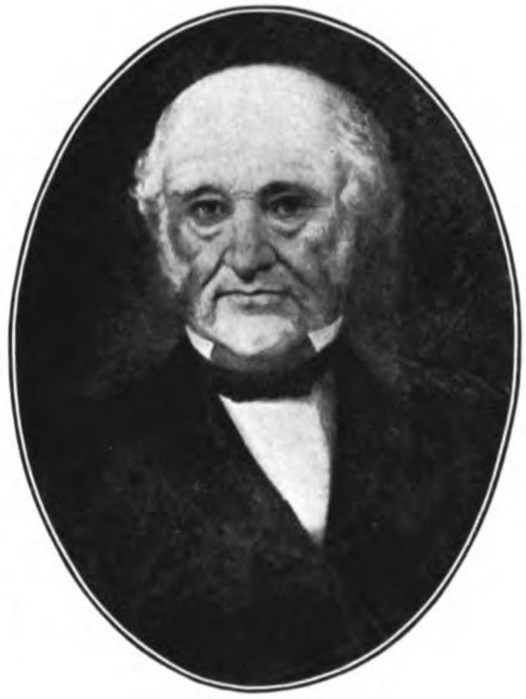

Member of the U.S. House of Representatives from Pennsylvania's 20th district
- In office March 4, 1847 – March 3, 1849
- Preceded by: John Hoge Ewing
- Succeeded by: Robert R. Reed
- In office March 4, 1843 – March 3, 1845
- Preceded by: Henry White Beeson
- Succeeded by: John Hoge Ewing

Member of the Pennsylvania Senate
- In office 1835; 1837

Personal details
- Born: June 23, 1794 Greensburg, Pennsylvania
- Died: March 14, 1853 (aged 58) Beaver, Pennsylvania
- Party: Whig

John Dickey (June 23, 1794 – March 14, 1853) was a Whig member of the U.S. House of Representatives from Pennsylvania.

== Biography ==
John Dickey (father of Oliver James Dickey) was born in Greensburg, Pennsylvania. He was appointed postmaster of Old Brighton, Pennsylvania, on April 11, 1818, and served until May 17, 1821. He served as sheriff from 1824 to 1827. He was a member of the Pennsylvania State Senate in 1835 and 1837.

Dickey was elected as a Whig to the Twenty-eighth Congress. He was again elected to the Thirtieth Congress. He was appointed United States Marshal for the western district of Pennsylvania on January 22, 1852. He died in Beaver, Pennsylvania, in 1853. Interment in the Old Cemetery.

== Sources ==
- United States Congress. "John Dickey (id: D000314)". Biographical Directory of the United States Congress.
- The Political Graveyard

U.S. House of Representatives
Preceded by Henry White Beeson	Member of the U.S. House of Representatives from Pennsylvania's 20th congressional district 1843–1845	Succeeded by John Hoge Ewing
Preceded by John Hoge Ewing	Member of the U.S. House of Representatives from Pennsylvania's 20th congressional district 1847–1849	Succeeded by Robert R. Reed
