= John Hoge Ewing =

American politician

John H. Ewing
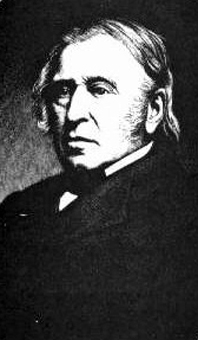
- portrait of John Hoge Ewing, was an American politician

Member of the U.S. House of Representatives from Pennsylvania's 20th district
- In office March 4, 1845 – March 3, 1847
- Preceded by: John Dickey
- Succeeded by: John Dickey

Member of the Pennsylvania Senate for the 17th district
- In office 1838-1842
- Preceded by: Isaac Leet
- Succeeded by: Walter Craig

Member of the Pennsylvania House of Representatives
- In office 1835-1836

Personal details
- Born: October 5, 1796 Brownsville, Pennsylvania, US
- Died: June 9, 1887 (aged 90) Washington, Pennsylvania, US
- Party: Whig
- Education: Washington College

John Hoge Ewing (October 5, 1796 – June 9, 1887) was an American politician from Pennsylvania who served as a Whig member of the U.S. House of Representatives for Pennsylvania's 20th congressional district from 1845 to 1847.

== Biography ==
Ewing, son of William Porter Ewing and Mary Conwell Ewing, was born near Brownsville, Pennsylvania, in 1796. In 1814, he graduated from Washington College (now Washington and Jefferson College) in Washington, Pennsylvania. He studied law, was admitted to the Bar in 1818, and commenced practice in Washington, Pennsylvania.

He practiced law for only two years when he was awarded a contract (in partnership with his father) to construct the National Pike's road-bed between Brownsville and Hillsborough, Pennsylvania, which was completed in 1820. Ewing never returned to the active practice of law, but instead engaged in a variety of business and agricultural pursuits.

On November 2, 1820, Ewing married Ellen Blaine, daughter of James Blaine, Esq., and aunt of James Gillespie Blaine, the Republican presidential candidate in 1884. The Ewings had ten children (not all of whom survived childhood) before Ellen Blaine Ewing died in 1840 from complications following childbirth; in 1845, John Hoge Ewing married Margaret Brown, with whom he had two children.

Ewing was a trustee of Washington College from 1834 to 1887 and of Washington Female Seminary from 1846 to 1887. He was a member of the Pennsylvania House of Representatives in 1835–36, and served in the Pennsylvania State Senate for the 17th district from 1838 to 1842. He was elected as a Whig to the Twenty-ninth Congress, and was a delegate to the 1860 Republican National Convention.

He was a staunch supporter of the Union cause during the Civil War, and in 1862, at the age of 66, served as Captain of Company F of the 6th Pennsylvania Regiment of Militia, which was briefly called up and deployed to Chambersburg, Pennsylvania during Robert E. Lee's Maryland invasion that September.

Ewing was an Elder and Trustee in the First Presbyterian Church of Washington, and was the long-time president of the Washington County Agricultural Society. He owned substantial tracts of land in Washington County, the Virginia (later West Virginia) panhandle, and Wright County, Iowa (and possibly other places). He also and operated a small coal mine a few miles north of Washington Borough in an area known as the Meadowlands.

In addition to his work on the National Road, Ewing was also a superintendent of construction over a portion of the Washington-Pittsburgh Turnpike in the mid-1830s. Additionally, Ewing was an active proponent of railroads as far back as 1831, and in the 1850s and 1860s he was instrumental in garnering local support for both the Hempfield Railroad and the Chartiers Valley Railroad, which linked Washington to Wheeling and Pittsburgh, respectively. In addition to serving on the board of directors of the Chartiers Valley Railroad and as the first president of the Washington-Waynesburg Railroad, Ewing was also a longtime director of the Franklin Bank of Washington.

Ewing died in Washington on June 9, 1887, at the age of 90.

== Sources ==
- United States Congress. "John Hoge Ewing (id: E000278)". Biographical Directory of the United States Congress.
- The Political Graveyard

Washington "Examiner" and "Reporter" newspapers, 1809–1888 Crumrine, Boyd, "History of Washington County, Pennsylvania" 1882. Earl Forrest, "History of Washington County, Pennsylvania," 1926. Beers, J.H., "Commemorative Biographical Record: Washington County, Pennsylvania.," 1893. (p. 44)

Pennsylvania House of Representatives
Preceded by	Member of the Pennsylvania House of Representatives; 1835-1836	Succeeded by
Pennsylvania State Senate
Preceded by Isaac Leet	Member of the Pennsylvania Senate, 17th district 1838-1842	Succeeded by Walter Craig
U.S. House of Representatives
Preceded by John Dickey	Member of the U.S. House of Representatives from Pennsylvania's 20th congressional district 1845–1847	Succeeded by John Dickey
