= Jonathan Knight (railroad executive) =

American civil engineer and politician (1787–1858)

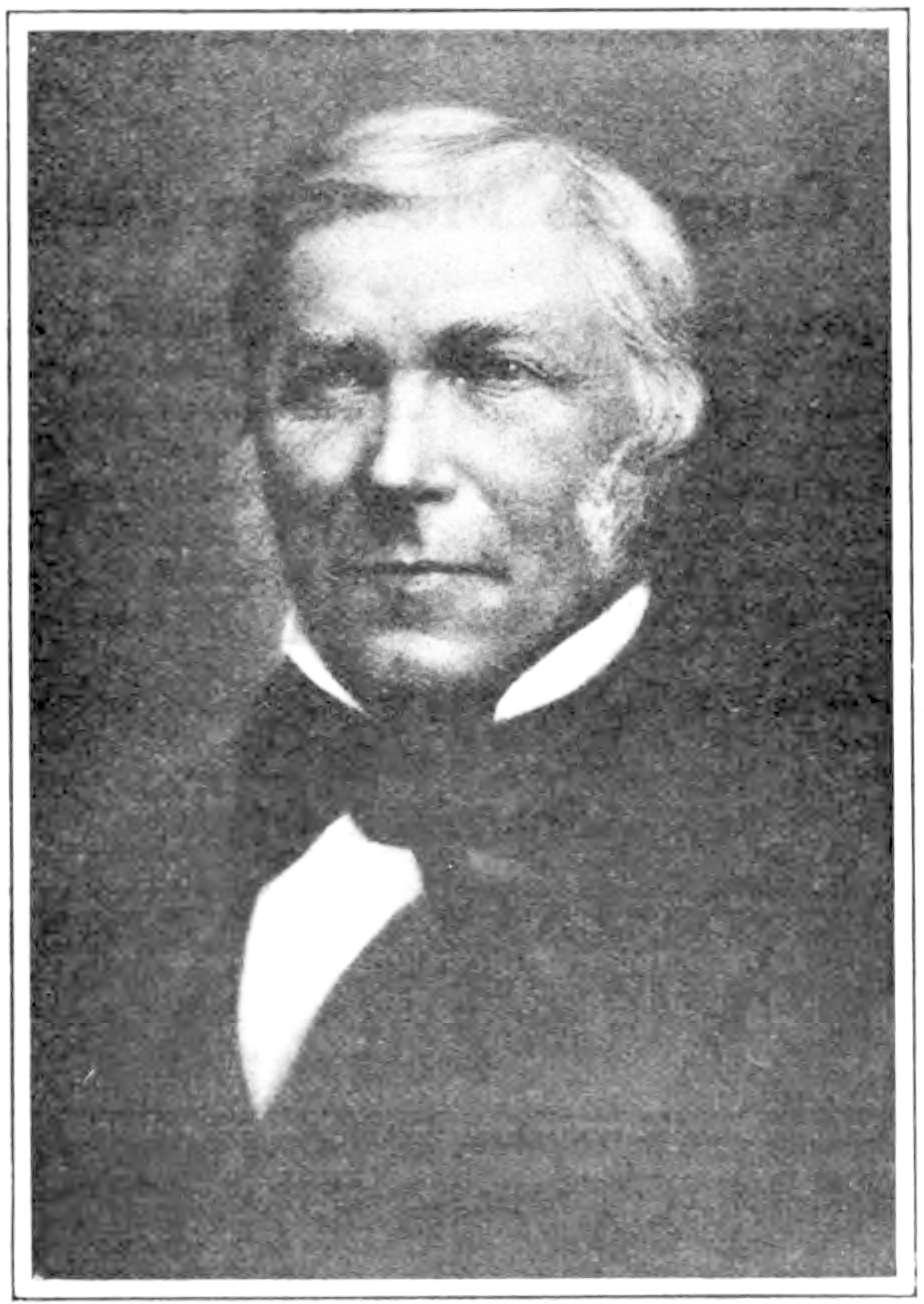
- Baltimore and Ohio employee magazine photo of Jonathan Knight

Member of the U.S. House of Representatives from Pennsylvania's 20th district
- In office March 4, 1855 – March 3, 1857
- Preceded by: John L. Dawson
- Succeeded by: William Montgomery

Member of the Pennsylvania Senate for the 20th district
- In office 1822–1828
- Preceded by: Rees Hill
- Succeeded by: Isaac Leet

Personal details
- Born: November 22, 1787 Bucks County, Pennsylvania, U.S.
- Died: November 22, 1858 (aged 71) East Bethlehem Township, Pennsylvania, U.S.
- Party: Whig
- Occupation: Civil engineer

Jonathan Knight (November 22, 1787 – November 22, 1858) was an American civil engineer and politician associated with early United States internal improvements. He served as a commissioner and engineer on the National Road, where he conducted route-location surveys in Ohio and Indiana beginning in the early 1820s and helped establish alignments and sectional divisions used for construction.

In 1828, Knight joined the Baltimore and Ohio Railroad and, following service on its initial Board of Engineers, became its chief engineer in 1830. His work included route evaluation, track design decisions, and the adaptation of British railway technology to American conditions during the railroad’s formative years.

Knight later served in the Pennsylvania Senate from 1822 to 1828 and in the U.S. House of Representatives from 1855 to 1857.

== Early life and education ==
Jonathan Knight was born in Bucks County, Pennsylvania, the tenth child of Abel and Anna S. Knight. In 1801, he moved with his parents to East Bethlehem Township, Pennsylvania in Washington County, Pennsylvania. He attended the common schools, worked as a teacher, and later purchased a farm. Knight eventually became a surveyor and later practiced as a civil engineer.

Knight developed technical skills through practical experience and self-study rather than formal engineering education, a pathway that Calhoun identifies as typical of early 19th-century American civil engineers, who were often trained through surveying and work on internal-improvement projects rather than formal schooling.

In 1816, he was appointed by the state of Pennsylvania to prepare a map of Washington County, Pennsylvania. He subsequently served as a county commissioner for three years.

== Professional career ==
Knight’s professional career combined survey work, internal-improvement engineering, and later railroad development. He assisted in preliminary surveys for the Chesapeake and Ohio Canal and the National Road between Cumberland, Maryland, and Wheeling, Virginia (now West Virginia), working under federal authority during the expansion of early transportation infrastructure.

In April 1828, Knight entered the service of the Baltimore and Ohio Railroad (B&O), where he later became its chief engineer during the railroad’s initial construction.

After leaving railroad service, he engaged in agricultural pursuits and served as secretary of an agricultural society in Washington County, Pennsylvania.

== National Road ==
Knight’s principal early engineering work was associated with the westward extension of the National Road under federal authority in the 1820s. An 1822 survey map attributed to him documents his route-location work for divisions 4 through 7 in Ohio. In 1825 he was appointed a commissioner for the extension of the road, serving under federal authority to complete its location west of the Ohio River through Ohio and Indiana.

During this period, the National Road was administered under a commissioner–superintendent system in which commissioners exercised responsibility for route location, contracts, and reporting, while construction was carried out through separately contracted work under federal oversight. Knight’s role as commissioner thus combined technical route-location work with administrative authority over the progress of the extension, an experience that informed his later work in railroad engineering and organization on the Baltimore and Ohio Railroad.

=== Ohio route location and alignment studies ===
Knight conducted comparative surveys of alternative alignments across Ohio, selecting routes that balanced grade, distance, and construction feasibility. He examined proposed deviations from earlier survey lines and recommended retaining the original alignments where alternatives did not provide sufficient engineering advantage.

Knight was directly involved in determining the final location between Fairview and Zanesville, a distance of approximately forty-four miles, which was surveyed, fixed, and subsequently placed under contract for construction.

=== Indiana survey and corridor development ===
In 1827, Knight was dispatched to survey the route across Indiana. Contemporary federal reports indicate that the survey work extended westward from Columbus toward Indianapolis, covering an estimated distance of approximately 167 miles along both direct and alternative routes.

He divided the survey into eastern and western sections and emphasized direct alignment, deviating only where terrain conditions required adjustment. He documented swampy terrain, flood-prone basins, and major river crossings, including the Wabash River, recommending a crossing near Terre Haute. Knight also evaluated the availability of construction materials, noting uneven limestone distribution and its implications for cost and surfacing methods.

=== Engineering method ===
Knight’s work illustrates early American route-location practice based on field measurement and empirical judgment. Survey parties used compass bearings and chain measurement, with field notes converted into mapped alignments using geometric methods. Rather than relying on formal analytical models, Knight adopted a comparative approach, examining alternative routes and selecting alignments based on observed terrain conditions and practical construction considerations. His work also reflects the administrative context of federal internal improvements, in which survey, location, contracting, and staged construction were closely coordinated through the commissioner system. Taken together, these practices reflect an early form of constraint-based engineering design, in which route alignment was determined by integrating terrain, materials, hydrology, and cost considerations.

=== Relationship to construction and administration ===
Knight’s role combined technical and administrative functions characteristic of early federal public works. Commissioners were responsible for determining route location, letting contracts, and supervising expenditures, while construction was executed by contractors under local superintendence.

This structure produced a partial overlap between engineering and administrative authority, with commissioners such as Knight directing surveys and location decisions while also managing contractual and financial aspects of the work. This experience is reflected in his later railroad work, particularly in his continued use of route-location methods and organized survey practices on the Baltimore and Ohio Railroad.

== Baltimore and Ohio Railroad ==
Knight entered the service of the Baltimore and Ohio Railroad (B&O) in April 1828 as part of its initial engineering organization, which combined federal engineering expertise, private management, and construction oversight within a Board of Engineers. The company appointed Knight and Stephen Harriman Long as engineers on equal footing in authority and compensation, though Long played the more prominent role in articulating the Board’s engineering policies. Knight, then a member of the Pennsylvania Senate, entered upon his duties on April 12, 1828, when the board first assembled.

At its first meeting, the board appointed Caspar Wever superintendent of construction. Wever had worked on the National Road, and Long later stated that Knight’s favorable testimony contributed to Wever’s appointment. Calhoun treats this arrangement as part of the B&O’s initial effort to combine federal engineering expertise, local civil engineering experience, and practical construction management.

In April and May 1828, Long and Knight personally examined principal routes from Baltimore toward Williamsport. Their report supported the route by the Point of Rocks and the Potomac valley over the alternative route by Jones Falls and Harman's Gap. The route-location work included quantitative comparisons of construction and transportation costs, including the estimated cost of double-track construction and repair, transportation costs, and the effect of grades on motive power and operating expense.

In 1828, Knight was sent to England with other B&O engineers to study railroad construction and operations. Upon his return in 1829, he continued in a senior engineering capacity, and after the Board of Engineers dissolved in 1830, he became the railroad’s chief engineer.

Knight’s tenure extended through the initial construction of the B&O’s main line westward from Baltimore, including early work toward Harpers Ferry, Virginia, as well as development of the Washington Branch connecting Baltimore and Washington, D.C..

=== Engineering practice and technology ===
Knight’s work on the B&O required adapting emerging British railway technology to American conditions. Early design decisions included selecting rail forms, track gauge, and wheel-flange configurations, all of which were unsettled in American practice during the late 1820s.

The railroad evaluated alternative track structures, including wood-and-iron systems and stone-supported rails, as well as imported English “patent rails,” which were ultimately rejected as too material-intensive for American conditions.

Knight also participated in decisions regarding track gauge and operating standards, initially adopting dimensions influenced by English practice before the railroad converged on a gauge consistent with that of the Liverpool and Manchester Railway.

His engineering work extended to a detailed evaluation of track behavior and performance. In assessing the use of stone rails, Knight argued that rails laid on edge in curved alignments would be unstable under load, reasoning that they would tend to overturn under the centrifugal force of passing trains; this conclusion was supported by analytical calculation.

The adoption of alternative rail systems also introduced operational challenges, including deformation of iron straps and the problem of “snake heads,” in which iron straps could loosen and penetrate rolling stock.

Knight’s approach to these problems reflected a continuation and adaptation of his National Road practice, in which route location, materials, and construction methods were treated as integrated elements of engineering design. On the railroad, this expanded to include mechanical and operational considerations, marking a transition from road engineering to a more complex, system-level form of civil engineering.

=== Institutional and engineering structure ===
The B&O’s first engineering organization divided responsibility between survey and design on one hand and execution of construction on the other. Knight and Long served on the Board of Engineers, while Wever, as superintendent of construction, was responsible for executing the board’s plans and instructions.

In practice, this arrangement produced disputes over control of route location, contracts, construction methods, and inspection authority. Calhoun treats these conflicts as characteristic of early American civil engineering, when the boundaries among engineers, commissioners, company officers, and construction supervisors were not yet fully differentiated.

The dissolution of the Board of Engineers in 1830 and Knight’s subsequent elevation to chief engineer marked a shift from divided to more centralized engineering authority on the Baltimore and Ohio Railroad. The earlier arrangement, which separated collective engineering direction from construction execution, had led to persistent disputes over control of route location, contracts, and inspections. Under the revised structure, technical authority was consolidated under a single chief engineer, aligning design, decision-making, and construction oversight within a more unified framework.

Historians have interpreted this transition as part of a broader evolution in early American railroad organization, in which experimental or hybrid governance arrangements gave way to more clearly defined engineering hierarchies.

Knight resigned from the B&O in 1842 and subsequently engaged in agricultural pursuits.

== Political career ==
Knight served as a member of the Pennsylvania Senate for the 20th district from 1822 to 1828.

He was elected as an Whig candidate to the Thirty-fourth Congress (1855–1857). However, Knight was an unsuccessful candidate for reelection in 1856 and for election in 1858. Following his congressional service, Knight resumed agricultural pursuits near East Bethlehem Township, Pennsylvania, where he remained until his death in 1858.

== Legacy ==
Knightstown, Indiana, was named in his honor, reflecting his role in surveying and planning the western extension of the National Road through the state during the 1820s.

Knight’s engineering work on the National Road and the Baltimore and Ohio Railroad places him among the early generation of American civil engineers who operated before the formalization of engineering education and professional practice. His career illustrates the transition from empirically based surveying and route location to more integrated forms of engineering design that incorporated materials, construction methods, and operational considerations.

On the National Road, Knight’s surveys in Ohio and Indiana contributed to the establishment of route alignments and sectional organization used for construction. His field notes and recommendations, including assessments of terrain, material availability, and bridge requirements, demonstrate the close relationship between surveying and design in early American infrastructure projects.

On the Baltimore and Ohio Railroad, Knight participated in adapting British railway technology to American conditions, including decisions regarding rail forms, track gauge, and track behavior. His work reflects the early development of railroad engineering as a system-level discipline integrating civil, mechanical, and operational factors.

Taken together, Knight’s career exemplifies the role of the early American civil engineer as a practitioner working across surveying, design, and construction in the formative period of the nation’s transportation infrastructure.

== Bibliography ==
- Knight, Jonathan (1838). Report Upon the Locomotive Engines: And the Police and Management of Several of the Principal Rail Roads in the Northern and Middle States. Lucas & Deaver.
- Chase, Patrick F. (2024). Jonathan Knight: Pathfinder of American Roads. Fillingim Brothers Publishing.

Pennsylvania State Senate
Preceded by Rees Hill	Member of the Pennsylvania Senate, 20th district 1822-1828	Succeeded by Isaac Leet
U.S. House of Representatives
Preceded by John L. Dawson	Member of the U.S. House of Representatives from Pennsylvania's 20th congressional district 1855–1857	Succeeded by William Montgomery
