= Darwin A. Finney =

American politician

Member of the U.S. House of Representatives from Pennsylvania's 20th district
- In office March 4, 1867 – August 25, 1868
- Preceded by: Charles Vernon Culver
- Succeeded by: Solomon Newton Pettis

Member of the Pennsylvania Senate
- In office 1856-1861

Personal details
- Born: August 11, 1814 Shrewsbury, Vermont
- Died: August 25, 1868 (aged 54) Brussels, Belgium
- Party: Republican

Darwin Asahel Finney (August 11, 1814 – August 25, 1868) was a Republican member of the U.S. House of Representatives from Pennsylvania.

== Early life ==
Darwin Asahel Finney was born in Shrewsbury, Vermont. He attended the public schools and attended the military academy at Norwich, Vermont (then the ALS&MA, now Norwich University). He moved with his parents to Meadville, Pennsylvania. He served in a clerk in a law office in Kingsbury, New York, in 1834 and 1835. He graduated from Allegheny College in Meadville in 1840. He studied law, was admitted to the bar in 1842 and commenced practice in Meadville.

== Public service ==
He was a member of the Pennsylvania State Senate from 1856 to 1861.

Finnery was elected as a Republican to the Fortieth Congress and served until his death at Brussels, Belgium, in 1868. Interment in Greendale Cemetery in Meadville, Pennsylvania. Cenotaph at Congressional Cemetery in Washington, D.C.

== See also ==
- List of members of the United States Congress who died in office (1790–1899)

== Sources ==
- United States Congress. "Darwin A. Finney (id: F000136)". Biographical Directory of the United States Congress. Retrieved on 2009-5-15
- The Political Graveyard

U.S. House of Representatives
Preceded by Charles V. Culver	Member of the U.S. House of Representatives from Pennsylvania's 20th congressional district 1867–1868	Succeeded by S. Newton Pettis
