= William Montgomery (Pennsylvania politician, born 1818) =

American politician

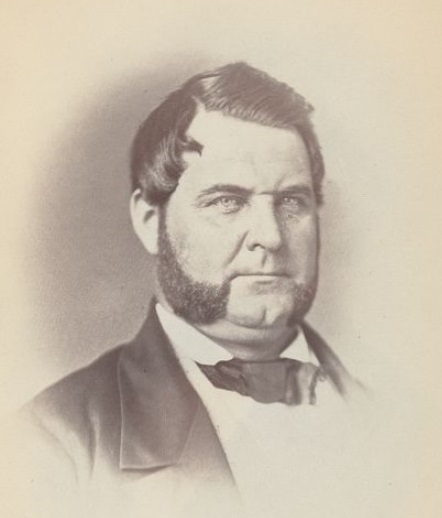
William Montgomery (Pennsylvania Congressman)

William Montgomery (April 11, 1818 – April 28, 1870) was a Democratic member of the U.S. House of Representatives from Pennsylvania.

== Formative years ==
Born in Canton Township, Pennsylvania on April 11, 1818, Montgomery pursued classical studies before graduating from Washington College (now Washington and Jefferson College) in Washington, Pennsylvania in 1839.

He then studied law and was admitted to the bar in 1841.

== Career ==
Following the completion of his legal studies, Montgomery opened a private law practice in Washington County. Appointed as district attorney in 1845, he became an unsuccessful candidate for election to the United States House of Representatives in 1854.

Montgomery was elected as a Democrat to the Thirty-fifth and Thirty-sixth Congresses, however, but was not a candidate for renomination in 1860.

He then served as was a delegate to the 1860 Democratic National Convention and resumed the practice of law. Six years later, he ran again for Congress, but was also unsuccessful in that 1866 election.

== Death and interment ==
Montgomery died in Washington County, Pennsylvania on April 28, 1870, and was interred in the Washington Cemetery.

== Sources ==
- United States Congress. "William Montgomery (id: M000875)". Biographical Directory of the United States Congress.
- The Political Graveyard

U.S. House of Representatives
| Preceded by Jonathan Knight | Member of the U.S. House of Representatives from Pennsylvania's 20th congressional district 1857–1861 | Succeeded by Jesse Lazear |
