= J. Monroe Reisinger =

James Monroe Reisinger
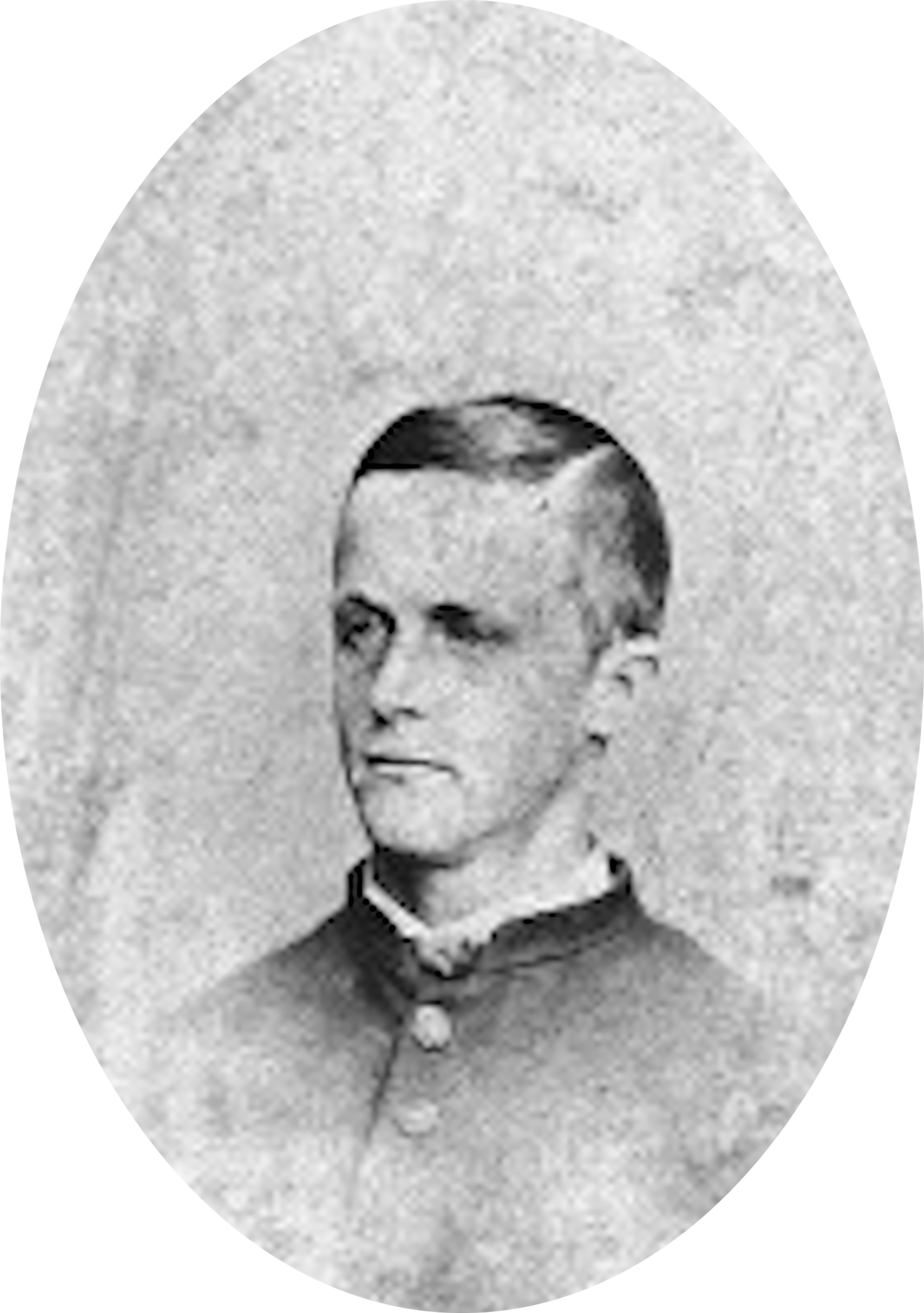
- Born: October 28, 1842; Fallston, Pennsylvania, US
- Died: May 25, 1925 (aged 82); Franklin, Pennsylvania, US
- Burial place: Greendale Cemetery
- Military career
- Allegiance: United States
- Branch: US Army
- Service years: 1862 - 1867
- Rank: First Lieutenant
- Units: Company H, 150th Pennsylvania Infantry
- Conflicts: Battle of Gettysburg; American Civil War
- Awards: Medal of Honor

James Monroe "Roe" Reisinger (October 28, 1842 – May 25, 1925) was an American soldier who fought with the Union Army in the American Civil War. Reisinger received his country's highest award for bravery during combat, the Medal of Honor, for actions taken on July 1, 1863 during the Battle of Gettysburg.

== Early life ==
Reisinger was born in Fallston, Pennsylvania in 1842 to Charles and Providence Reisinger. At age 2, the family moved to Venango County, Pennsylvania, and worked as farmers, lumberers, and blacksmiths. After six years, the family moved yet again, to Meadville, Pennsylvania where Roe attended school for three years, attending the Meadville Academy.

== Civil War service ==
At the onset of the Civil War, Reisinger enlisted with the 150th Pennsylvania Infantry Regiment and was assigned to Company H. His first conflict was at the Battle of Gettysburg where he served as one of the color corporals for his regiment. At around 2 o'clock, Reisinger was wounded by a musket shot to the ball of the right foot and had to proceed on crutches. Told to fall to the back of the unit, he refused, and marched forward on his heel. The 150th engaged a large Confederate advance near the McPherson house, and here Reisinger was shot a second time, in the right leg. As he fell back he was shot for a third time, in the right hip. Reisinger was held in a hospital for nearly a year, with the final musket ball extracted in May, 1864. For his valor during the fight, Reisinger was awarded the Medal of Honor on January 25, 1907.

After his recovery, Reisinger was assigned to Company B of the 14th Reserve Corps, and then served as an officer in the 114th Regiment Infantry U.S. Colored Troops in Texas until 1867.

== Medal of Honor citation ==
The President of the United States of America, in the name of Congress, takes pleasure in presenting the Medal of Honor to Corporal James Monroe Reisinger, United States Army, for extraordinary heroism on 1 July 1863, while serving with Company H, 150th Pennsylvania Infantry, in action at Gettysburg, Pennsylvania, for specially brave and meritorious conduct in the face of the enemy.

== Personal life ==
After his service, Reisinger studied law and was admitted to the bar, practicing in Meadville. He also worked as a newspaper publisher, and worked with the Galena-Signal Oil Company until retirement.

Reisinger died in 1925 at the age of 82.
