= Henry Smith Munroe =

- Born: March 25, 1850; Brooklyn, New York, United States
- Died: May 4, 1933 (aged 83); Litchfield, Connecticut, United States
- Occupations: Scientist, educator United States
- Known for: Foreign advisor to Meiji Japan

Henry Smith Munroe (March 25, 1850 – May 4, 1933) (born Henry Maynard Smith) was an American geologist who worked in Meiji period Japan as a foreign advisor to the Japanese government.

== Biography ==
Munroe was born in Brooklyn, New York and obtained a Masters of Engineering at Columbia University in 1869. From 1870 to 1871 he worked as Assistant Geologist with the Ohio State Geological Survey. Between 1870 and 1872 he occupied the post of Assistant Chemist at the United States Department of Agriculture.

Hired by the Japanese government on a three-year contract from 1872 and 1875, Munroe was assigned to Yesso (now Hokkaidō), in northern Japan, as Assistant Geologist and Mining Engineer with the Geological Survey of Yesso for the Hokkaidō Colonization Agency. Munroe was one of a group of foreign engineers (including Horace Capron, Thomas Antisell, A.G. Warfield and Benjamin Lyman) who conducted a land and resources survey of Hokkaidō, with the particular aim of developing its mineral resources. Munroe was assigned to work with Lyman on a geological survey after Antisell had been dismissed from his post due to personal conflicts with Capron. His work laid the foundations for the future coal mining industry in Hokkaido.

At the conclusion of his contract, Munroe was hired as a professor of Geology and Mining at the Tokyo Imperial University from 1875 and 1876.

Munroe returned to the United States, and obtained his Ph.D. at Columbia University in 1877, where he subsequently became Adjunct Professor of Mining until 1891. He was Professor of Mining at Columbia from 1891 until 1915. From 1897 to 1899 he was Dean, Faculty of Applied Sciences, Columbia University. In 1917 he became Consulting Engineer to the United States Bureau of Mines. His brother, Edmund Munroe Smith, was also a professor at Columbia.

On May 4, 1933, Munroe died at home in Litchfield, Connecticut.
