= Robert R. Reed =

American politician (1807–1864)

Robert Rentoul Reed

Member of the U.S. House of Representatives from Pennsylvania's 20th district
- In office March 4, 1849 – March 3, 1851
- Preceded by: John Dickey
- Succeeded by: John Allison

Personal details
- Born: March 12, 1807 Washington, Pennsylvania
- Died: December 14, 1864 (aged 57) Washington, Pennsylvania
- Education: Washington and Jefferson College; University of Pennsylvania

Robert Rentoul Reed (March 12, 1807 – December 14, 1864) was a Whig member of the U.S. House of Representatives from Pennsylvania.

Reed was born in Washington, Pennsylvania. He graduated from Washington and Jefferson College in Washington in 1824 and from the medical department of the University of Pennsylvania in 1829. He began the practice of medicine in Washington.

Reed was elected as a Whig to the Thirty-first Congress. He was a member of the Pennsylvania House of Representatives in 1863 and 1864. He died near Washington in 1864, and was interred in Washington Cemetery.

== Sources ==
- United States Congress. "Robert R. Reed (id: R000126)". Biographical Directory of the United States Congress.
- The Political Graveyard

U.S. House of Representatives
Preceded by John Dickey	Member of the U.S. House of Representatives from Pennsylvania's 20th congressional district 1849–1851	Succeeded by John Allison
