= Edward S. Brooks =

American politician

Edward Schroeder Brooks
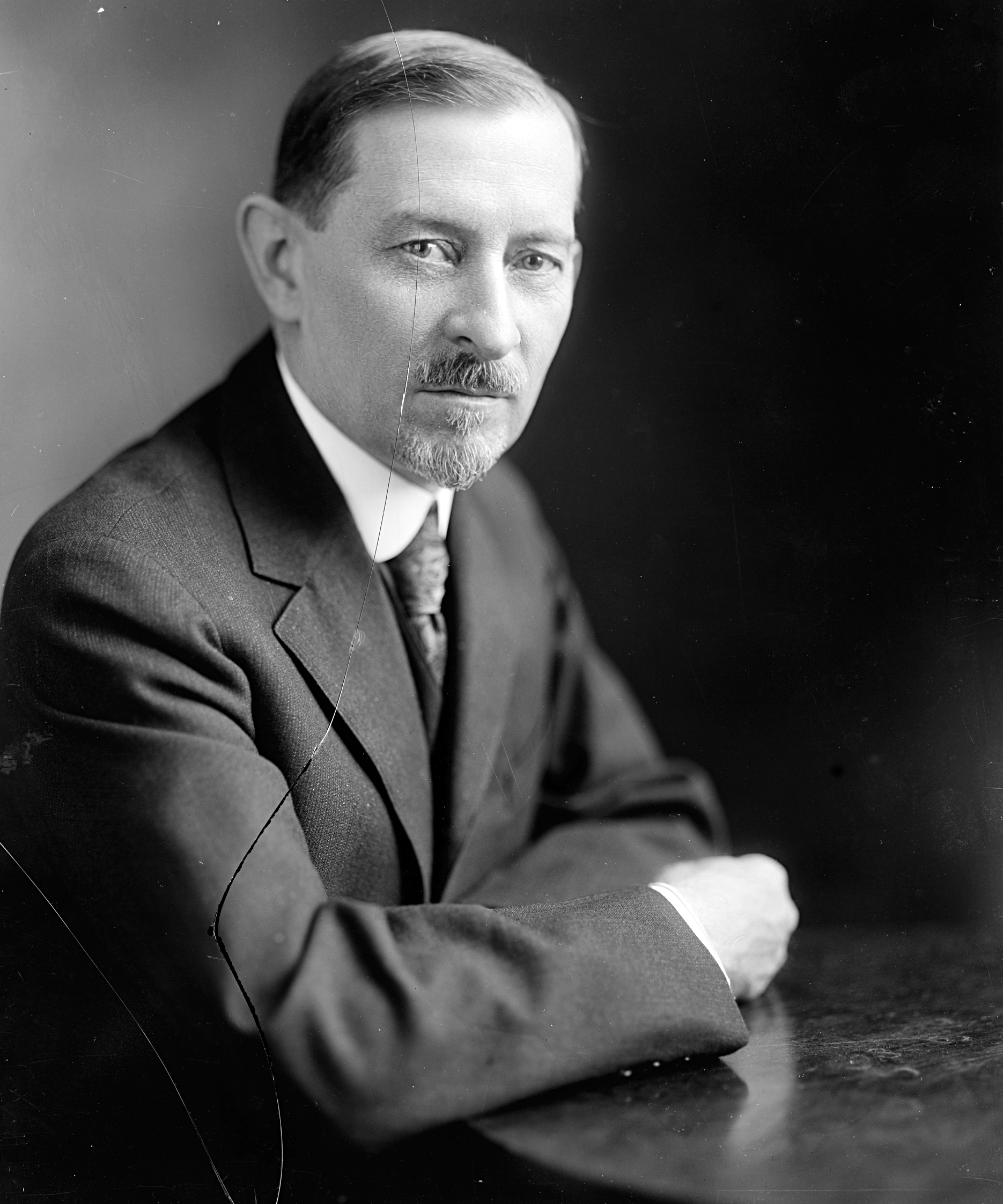

Member of the U.S. House of Representatives from Pennsylvania's 20th district
- In office March 4, 1919 – March 3, 1923
- Preceded by: Andrew R. Brodbeck
- Succeeded by: George M. Wertz

Personal details
- Born: June 14, 1867 York, Pennsylvania, U.S.
- Died: July 12, 1957 (aged 90) York, Pennsylvania, U.S.
- Resting place: Prospect Hill Cemetery
- Party: Republican

Edward Schroeder Brooks (June 14, 1867 – July 12, 1957) was a Republican member of the U.S. House of Representatives from Pennsylvania.

== Early life ==
Edward S. Brooks was born in York, Pennsylvania. He attended the York County Academy and York Collegiate Institute.

== Career ==
He was engaged as a banker, manufacturer of steel forgings, and as a contractor. He served as a member of the city council from 1897 to 1902, and as treasurer of York County, Pennsylvania, from 1903 to 1905. He was a member of the Republican State committee in 1917 and 1918.

Brooks was elected as a Republican to the Sixty-sixth and Sixty-seventh Congresses. He was not a candidate for renomination in 1922. After his time in Congress, he served as acting postmaster of York, Pennsylvania, from September 30, 1925, until February 23, 1926, and postmaster from 1926 to 1931. He was engaged in the clothing business from 1937 until his retirement.

== Personal life ==
He was a member of Knights of Pythias.

== Death ==
He died in York and is buried in Prospect Hill Cemetery.

== Sources ==
- United States Congress. "Edward S. Brooks (id: B000876)". Biographical Directory of the United States Congress.
- The Political Graveyard

U.S. House of Representatives
Preceded by Andrew R. Brodbeck	Member of the U.S. House of Representatives from Pennsylvania's 20th congressional district 1919 - 1923	Succeeded by George M. Wertz
