= Charles Vernon Culver =

American politician

Member of the U.S. House of Representatives from Pennsylvania's 20th district
- In office March 4, 1865 – March 3, 1867
- Preceded by: Amos Myers
- Succeeded by: Darwin A. Finney

Personal details
- Born: September 6, 1830 Logan, Ohio
- Died: January 10, 1909 (aged 78) Philadelphia, Pennsylvania
- Party: Republican

Charles Vernon Culver (September 6, 1830 – January 10, 1909) was a Republican member of the U.S. House of Representatives from Pennsylvania.

== Early life ==
Culver was born in Logan, Ohio. He received a liberal preparatory schooling and attended the Ohio Wesleyan University in Delaware, Ohio. He moved to Pennsylvania and settled in Reno, Pennsylvania, and engaged in mercantile pursuits. He also became interested in the development of oil in Venango County, Pennsylvania, and the establishment of national banks in thirteen cities throughout the East.

He was elected as a Republican to the Thirty-ninth Congress. He was not a candidate for renomination in 1866. While a member of Congress, he became bankrupt and was imprisoned in 1866 but was eventually acquitted after a long trial. He resumed operations in the oil business, with headquarters in Franklin, Pennsylvania. He died while on a business trip in Philadelphia in 1909. He was interred in Franklin Cemetery in Franklin, Pennsylvania.

== Culver and the Great Bank Scandal ==
Culver had made a small profit in Logan, Ohio, by investing some bank money in oil. He took that money and began buying up banks throughout the oil region. He bought land two miles below Oil City, Pennsylvania, where he established the town of Reno and The Reno Oil and Land Company and starting selling stock in what appears to have been a basic pyramid scheme.

Culver also attempted to establish the Reno-Pithole railroad, to run between Reno and Pithole, Pennsylvania, the leading oil boom town at the time. Culver was not one for half measures—to run the railroad he hired Ambrose Burnside, and to hook investors, he brought deep-pocketed men of wealth from all over the country to tour his as-yet-non-existent oil fields.

Ultimately Culver's plan collapsed and he was pursued by creditors and courts up and down the oil region. The collapse of his banks triggered a financial panic throughout the oil region that drove many oilmen out of the business and created chaos that set the stage for men like John D. Rockefeller to move in.

A more complete and colorful account of Culver's career can be found in the book The Great Oildorado by Hildegarde Dolson.

U.S. House of Representatives
Preceded by Amos Myers	Member of the U.S. House of Representatives from Pennsylvania's 20th congressional district 1865–1867	Succeeded by Darwin A. Finney
