= Jesse Lazear =

American politician

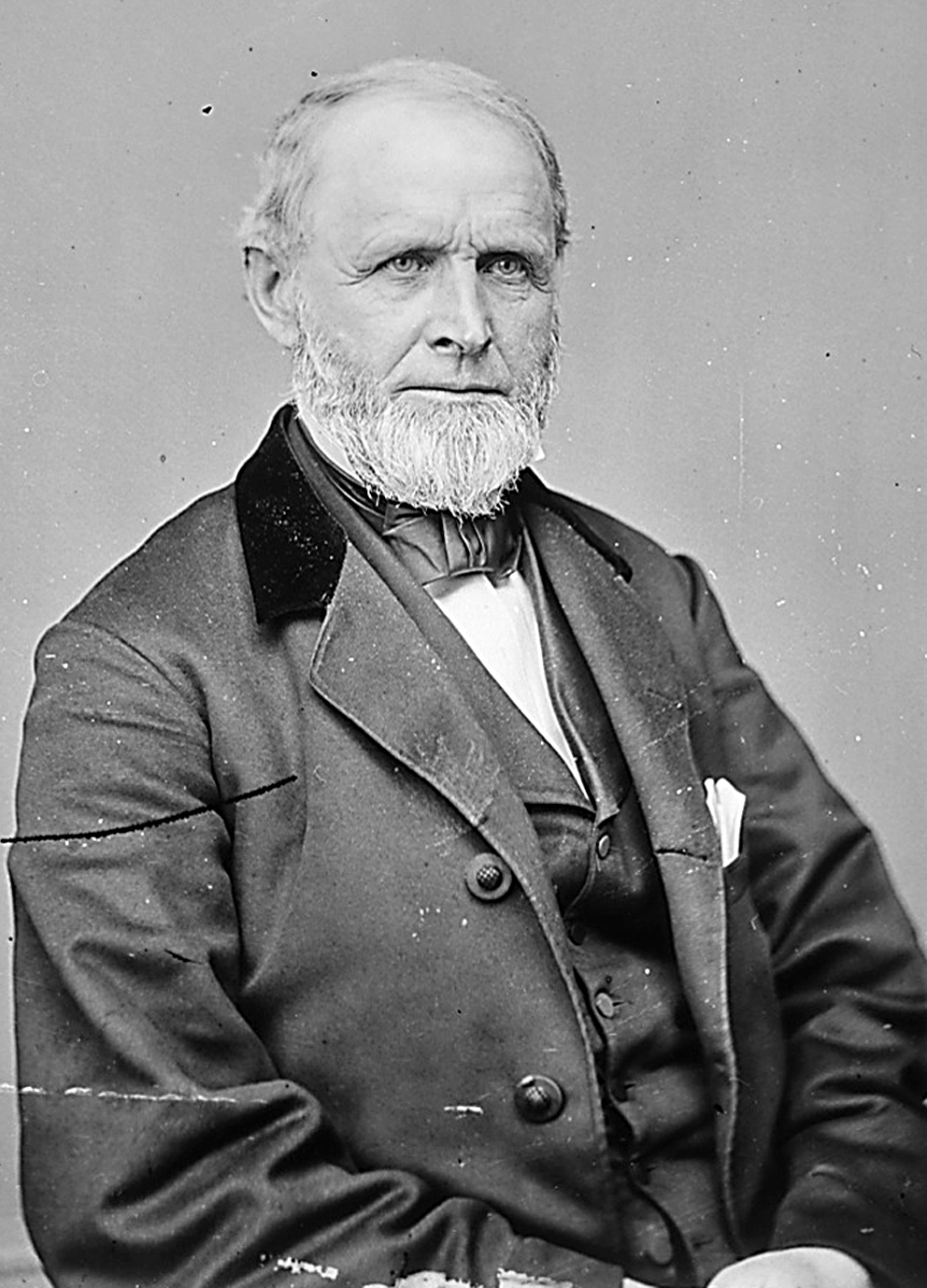

Member of the U.S. House of Representatives from Pennsylvania
- In office March 4, 1861 – March 3, 1865
- Preceded by: William Montgomery (20th); John Patton (24th)
- Succeeded by: Amos Myers (20th); George V. Lawrence (24th)
- Constituency: 20th district (1861-63); 24th district (1863-65)

Personal details
- Born: December 12, 1804 Richhill Township, Pennsylvania, US
- Died: September 2, 1877 (aged 72) Baltimore County, Maryland, US
- Party: Democratic

Jesse Lazear (December 12, 1804 – September 2, 1877) was a Democratic member of the U.S. House of Representatives from Pennsylvania.

== Biography ==
Lazear was born to Thomas Lazear, Esq., and Elizabeth (Braddock) in Richhill Township, Greene County, Pennsylvania. He received a limited schooling, taught school, and engaged in mercantile pursuits. He served as Recorder of Deeds for Greene County, Pennsylvania, from 1829 to 1832. Lazear was a bank cashier of the Farmers & Drovers' Bank in Waynesburg, Pennsylvania from 1835 to 1867.

Lazear was elected as a Democrat to the Thirty-seventh and Thirty-eighth Congresses. He served as chairman of the United States House Committee on Expenditures on Public Buildings during the Thirty-seventh Congress. He was not a candidate for renomination in 1864.

Lazear was a delegate to the Union National Convention at Philadelphia in 1866. He retired to his country home, "Windsor Mill Farm", in Woodlawn, Baltimore County, Maryland, in 1867. He served as president of the Baltimore & Powhatan Railroad Company from 1871 to 1874.

== Death and interment ==
Lazear died at his country home in 1877 and was interred in the Green Mount Cemetery in Waynesburg.

== Sources ==
- United States Congress. "Jesse Lazear (id: L000154)". Biographical Directory of the United States Congress.
- Jesse Lazear at The Political Graveyard

U.S. House of Representatives
Preceded by William Montgomery	Member of the U.S. House of Representatives from Pennsylvania's 20th congressional district 1861–1863	Succeeded by Amos Myers
Preceded by John Patton	Member of the U.S. House of Representatives from Pennsylvania's 24th congressional district 1863–1865	Succeeded by George V. E. Lawrence
