= Munroe Smith =

American jurist and historian (1854–1926)

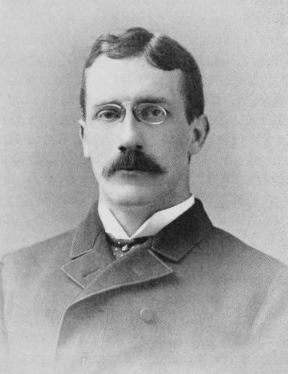
- Born: Edmund Munroe Smith; December 8, 1854; Brooklyn, New York, US
- Died: April 13, 1926 (aged 71); New York, New York, US
- Education: Amherst College; Columbia Law School; University of Göttingen
- Occupations: Jurist, historian
- Spouse: Emma Gertrude Huidekoper (m. 1890)
- Children: 1

Edmund Munroe Smith (December 8, 1854 – April 13, 1926) was an American jurist and historian.

== Family and education ==
Smith was born in Brooklyn, New York, the son of Horatio Southgate Smith and his wife, Susan Dwight Munroe. He received his A.B. from Amherst College in 1874 and his LL.B. from Columbia Law School in 1877. In 1879, Smith returned to Amherst to earn an A.M. degree. He received the degree of J.U.D. from the University of Göttingen in 1880.

In 1890, Smith married Emma Gertrude Huidekoper, daughter of General Henry S. Huidekoper. They had one daughter, Gertrude Munroe Smith, born in 1891. Smith's brother, Henry Maynard Smith (he changed his name to Henry Smith Munroe), was also a professor at Columbia, and served as Dean of the School of Mines from 1891 to 1915. Smith's great-granddaughter is Meg Whitman, former CEO of eBay and candidate for Governor of California.

== Career ==
Smith filled several posts at Columbia University from 1880 onwards. He was a lecturer in Roman law and an instructor in history from 1880 to 1883. He was promoted to adjunct professor of history in 1883, and became a full professor of Roman law and comparative jurisprudence in 1891. Smith was one of the founders of the Political Science Quarterly, and served as its managing editor from 1886 to 1893 and again from 1904 to 1913.

He retired from teaching in 1924 and died of pneumonia at his home in Manhattan on April 13, 1926, at the age of 71.

== Publications ==
His works include:

- Smith, Edmund Munroe (1883). The Law of Nationality. Chicago: Melbert B. Cary & Co.
- Smith, Edmund Munroe (1898). Bismarck and German Unity, a historical outline. Columbia University Press.
- Smith, Edmund Munroe (1915). Military Strategy Versus Diplomacy in Bismarck's Time and Afterwards. New York: Ginn & Company.
- Smith, Edmund Munroe (1916). American Diplomacy in the European War. New York: Ginn & Company.
- Smith, Edmund Munroe (1918). Militarism and Statecraft. New York and London: G.P. Putnam's Sons.

He wrote articles on Roman law and cognate subjects for the New International Encyclopedia.
