= 150th Pennsylvania Infantry Regiment =

Union Army volunteer infantry regiment

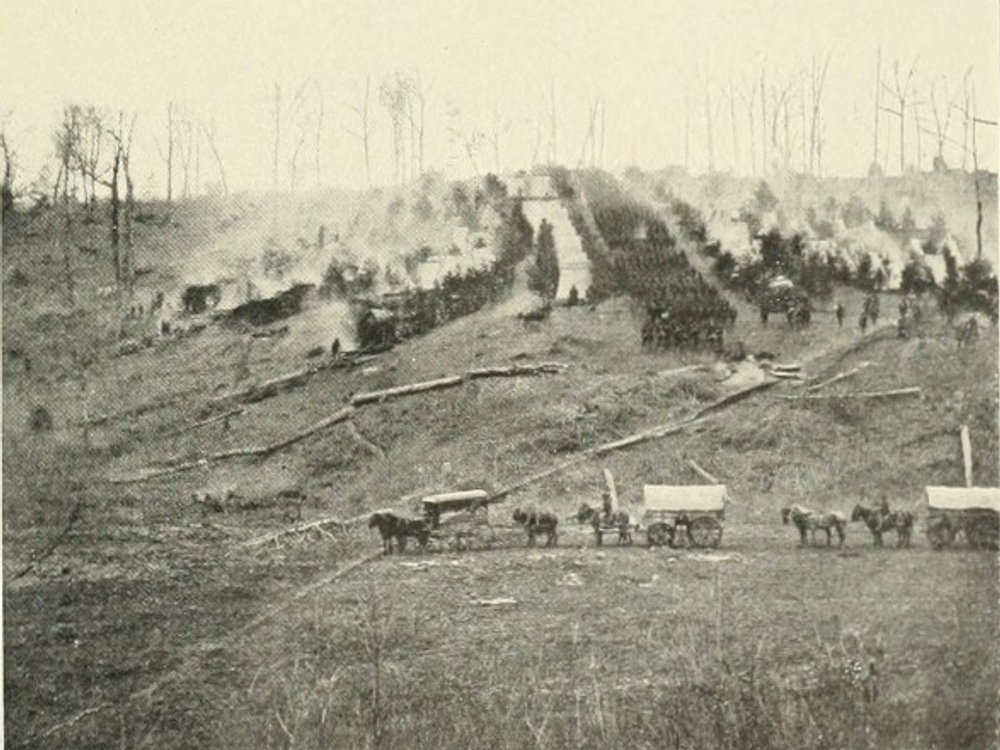
- The 150th Pennsylvania in early April 1863.
- Active: September 04, 1862 – June 24, 1865
- Disbanded: June 24, 1865
- Country: United States
- Allegiance: Union
- Branch: Infantry
- Engagements: American Civil War: Chancellorsville Campaign; Gettysburg campaign; Bristoe Campaign; Mine Run Campaign; Overland Campaign; Petersburg Campaign

Commanders
- Notable commanders: Col. Langhorne Wister; Lt. Col. Henry S. Huidekoper

The 150th Pennsylvania Infantry was a Union Army volunteer regiment during the American Civil War. Gettysburg was the first major battle that the 150th was in, where it held back overwhelming numbers of Confederates for several hours.

== Service history ==
Colonel Langhorne Wister raised the 150th Pennsylvania Infantry in Philadelphia and Harrisburg in September 1862. The regiment quickly joined the defences at Washington D.C. Its Company K, commanded by Captain David Derrickson, was detached and served as bodyguard for President Abraham Lincoln for the duration of the war, including at his stay at the Soldiers' Home. The rest of the regiment joined the Army of the Potomac in February 1863. There it served in the 2nd Brigade, 3rd Division, First Corps.

Going into Gettysburg with 397 men present it saw action on all three days. Colonel Wister assumed brigade command and every field officer was wounded. The regiment lost 53 men killed & mortally wounded, 134 wounded, and 77 missing. Lieutenant-colonel Henry S. Huidekoper and Corporal J. Monroe Reisinger received the Medal of Honor while members of the regiment.

In 1864 the 150th was transferred to the Fifth Corps where it was in various brigades, including that of Brig. Gen. Joshua L. Chamberlain. It continued to serve until it was mustered out in June 1865.

== See also ==
- List of Pennsylvania Civil War regiments
