= Andrew R. Brodbeck =

American politician

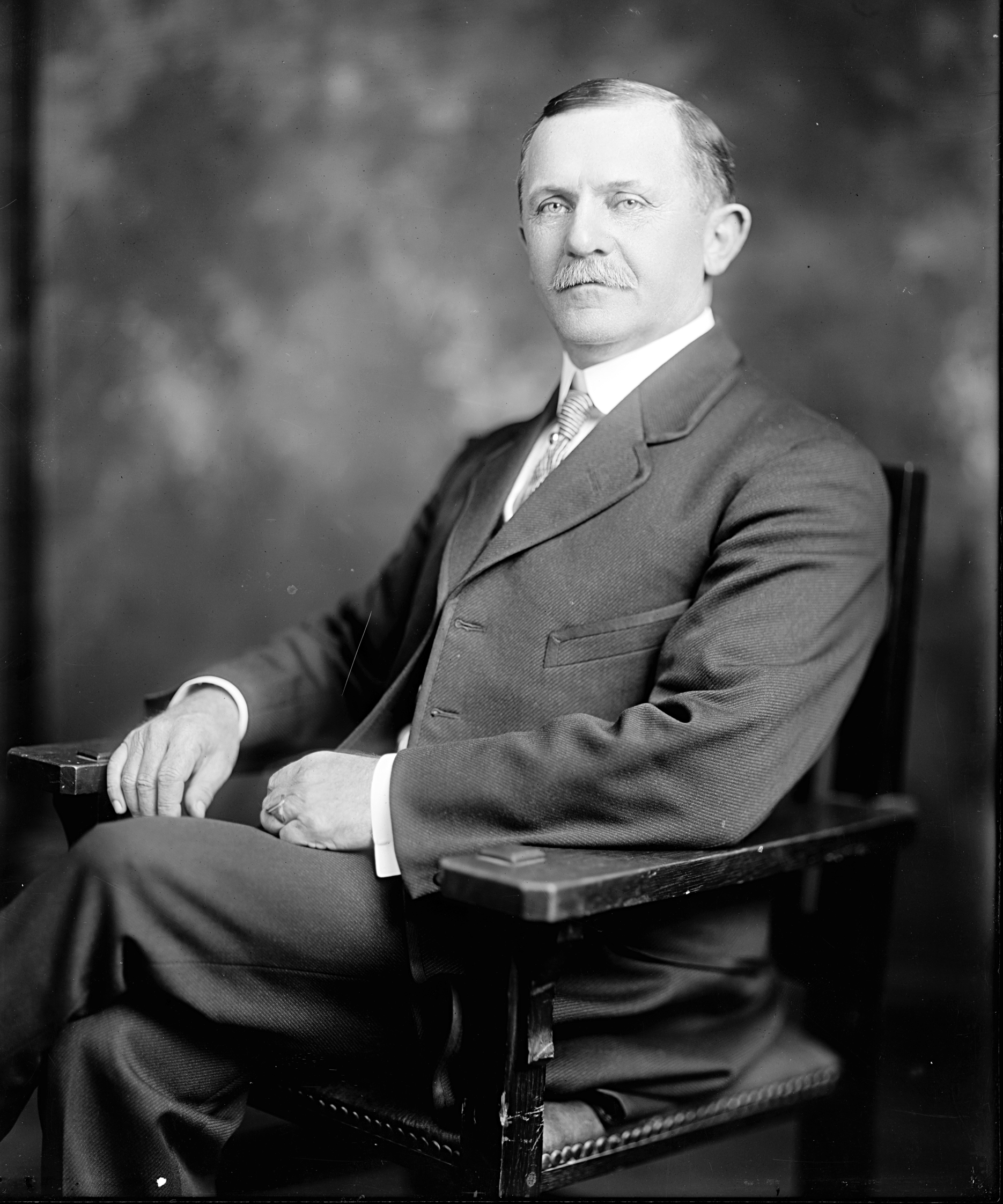

Member of the U.S. House of Representatives from Pennsylvania's 20th district
- In office March 4, 1917 – March 3, 1919
- Preceded by: Cyrus William Beales
- Succeeded by: Edward Schroeder Brooks
- In office March 4, 1913 – March 3, 1915
- Preceded by: Daniel F. Lafean
- Succeeded by: Cyrus William Beales

Personal details
- Born: April 11, 1860 Jefferson, Pennsylvania, U.S.
- Died: February 27, 1937 (aged 76) Hanover, Pennsylvania, U.S.
- Party: Democratic

Andrew R. Brodbeck (April 11, 1860 – February 27, 1937) was an American businessman and Democratic member of the U.S. House of Representatives from Pennsylvania, serving two non-consecutive terms from 1913 to 1915 and again from 1917 to 1919.

== Biography ==
Andrew R. Brodbeck was born in Jefferson, Pennsylvania. He was engaged in agricultural pursuits, and taught in the public schools of York County from 1878 to 1880. He moved to Hanover, Pennsylvania, in 1880 and engaged in the farm implement and fertilizer business until 1896. He served as sheriff of York County from 1896 to 1899. He was a member of the board of directors of various business enterprises. He was an unsuccessful candidate for election in 1910.

=== Congress ===
Brodbeck was elected as a Democrat to the Sixty-third Congress, but was an unsuccessful candidate for reelection in 1914. He was again elected to the Sixty-fifth Congress. He was an unsuccessful candidate for reelection in 1918. He was a delegate at large to the 1920 Democratic National Convention.

== Retirement and death ==
He retired in 1920 and died in Hanover and was buried in Mount Olivet Cemetery.

== Sources ==
- United States Congress. "Andrew R. Brodbeck (id: B000855)". Biographical Directory of the United States Congress.
- The Political Graveyard

U.S. House of Representatives
Preceded by Daniel F. Lafean	Member of the U.S. House of Representatives from Pennsylvania's 20th congressional district 1913–1915	Succeeded by Cyrus William Beales
Preceded by Cyrus William Beales	Member of the U.S. House of Representatives from Pennsylvania's 20th congressional district 1917–1919	Succeeded by Edward Schroeder Brooks
