= Pennsylvania's 20th congressional district =

Former U.S. House district in Pennsylvania

- Obsolete district
- Created: 1830
- Eliminated: 2000
- Years active: 1833-2003

Pennsylvania's twentieth congressional district was a congressional district in southwestern Pennsylvania. It was created following the 1830 census and was disbanded after the 2000 census removed two representatives from Pennsylvania. The 18th district is generally considered to be its successor, although the 12th district contains some of its territory.

== List of members representing the district ==
Representatives	Party	Years	Cong ress	Electoral history
District established March 4, 1833
Andrew Stewart (Uniontown)	Anti-Masonic	March 4, 1833 – March 3, 1835	23rd	Redistricted from the 14th district and re-elected in 1832. [data missing]
Andrew Buchanan (Waynesburg)	Jacksonian	March 4, 1835 – March 3, 1837	24th 25th	Elected in 1834. Re-elected in 1836. [data missing]
Andrew Buchanan (Waynesburg)	Democratic	March 4, 1837 – March 3, 1839	24th 25th	Elected in 1834. Re-elected in 1836. [data missing]
Enos Hook (Waynesburg)	Democratic	March 4, 1839 – April 18, 1841	26th 27th	Elected in 1838. Re-elected in 1840. Resigned.
Vacant		April 18, 1841 – May 31, 1841	27th	
Henry W. Beeson (Uniontown)	Democratic	May 31, 1841 – March 3, 1843	27th	Elected to finish Hook's term. [data missing]
John Dickey (Beaver)	Whig	March 4, 1843 – March 3, 1845	28th	Elected in 1843. [data missing]
John H. Ewing (Washington)	Whig	March 4, 1845 – March 3, 1847	29th	Elected in 1844. [data missing]
John Dickey (Beaver)	Whig	March 4, 1847 – March 3, 1849	30th	Elected in 1846. [data missing]
Robert R. Reed (Washington)	Whig	March 4, 1849 – March 3, 1851	31st	Elected in 1848. [data missing]
John Allison (Beaver)	Whig	March 4, 1851 – March 3, 1853	32nd	Elected in 1850. [data missing]
John L. Dawson (Brownsville)	Democratic	March 4, 1853 – March 3, 1855	33rd	Redistricted from the 18th district and re-elected in 1852. [data missing]
Jonathan Knight (East Bethlehem)	Opposition	March 4, 1855 – March 3, 1857	34th	Elected in 1854. [data missing]
William Montgomery (Washington)	Democratic	March 4, 1857 – March 3, 1861	35th 36th	Elected in 1856. Re-elected in 1858. [data missing]
Jesse Lazear (Waynesburg)	Democratic	March 4, 1861 – March 3, 1863	37th	Elected in 1860. Redistricted to the 24th district.
Amos Myers (Clarion)	Republican	March 4, 1863 – March 3, 1865	38th	Elected in 1862. [data missing]
Charles V. Culver (Franklin)	Republican	March 4, 1865 – March 3, 1867	39th	Elected in 1864. [data missing]
Darwin A. Finney (Meadville)	Republican	March 4, 1867 – August 25, 1868	40th	Elected in 1866. Died.
Vacant		August 25, 1868 – December 7, 1868	40th	
S. Newton Pettis (Meadville)	Republican	December 7, 1868 – March 3, 1869	40th	Elected to finish Finney's term. [data missing]
Calvin W. Gilfillan (Franklin)	Republican	March 4, 1869 – March 3, 1871	41st	Elected in 1868. [data missing]
Samuel Griffith (Mercer)	Democratic	March 4, 1871 – March 3, 1873	42nd	Elected in 1870. [data missing]
Hiram L. Richmond (Meadville)	Republican	March 4, 1873 – March 3, 1875	43rd	Elected in 1872. [data missing]
Levi A. Mackey (Lock Haven)	Democratic	March 4, 1875 – March 3, 1879	44th 45th	Elected in 1874. Re-elected in 1876. [data missing]
Seth H. Yocum (Bellefonte)	Greenback	March 4, 1879 – March 3, 1881	46th	Elected in 1878. [data missing]
Andrew G. Curtin (Bellefonte)	Democratic	March 4, 1881 – March 3, 1887	47th 48th 49th	Elected in 1880. Re-elected in 1882. Re-elected in 1884. [data missing]
John Patton (Curwensville)	Republican	March 4, 1887 – March 3, 1889	50th	Elected in 1886. [data missing]
Edward Scull (Somerset)	Republican	March 4, 1889 – March 3, 1893	51st 52nd	Redistricted from the 17th district and re-elected in 1888. Re-elected in 1890. [data missing]
Josiah D. Hicks (Altoona)	Republican	March 4, 1893 – March 3, 1899	53rd 54th 55th	Elected in 1892. Re-elected in 1894. Re-elected in 1896. [data missing]
Joseph E. Thropp (Everett)	Republican	March 4, 1899 – March 3, 1901	56th	Elected in 1898. [data missing]
Alvin Evans (Ebensburg)	Republican	March 4, 1901 – March 3, 1903	57th	Elected in 1900. Redistricted to the 19th district.
Daniel F. Lafean (York)	Republican	March 4, 1903 – March 3, 1913	58th 59th 60th 61st 62nd	Elected in 1902. Re-elected in 1904. Re-elected in 1906. Re-elected in 1908. Re-elected in 1910. [data missing]
Andrew R. Brodbeck (Hanover)	Democratic	March 4, 1913 – March 3, 1915	63rd	Elected in 1912. [data missing]
Cyrus W. Beales (Gettysburg)	Republican	March 4, 1915 – March 3, 1917	64th	Elected in 1914. [data missing]
Andrew R. Brodbeck (Hanover)	Democratic	March 4, 1917 – March 3, 1919	65th	Elected in 1916. [data missing]
Edward S. Brooks (York)	Republican	March 4, 1919 – March 3, 1923	66th 67th	Elected in 1918. Re-elected in 1920. [data missing]
George M. Wertz (Johnstown)	Republican	March 4, 1923 – March 3, 1925	68th	Elected in 1922. [data missing]
Anderson H. Walters (Johnstown)	Republican	March 4, 1925 – March 3, 1927	69th	Elected in 1924. [data missing]
J. Russell Leech (Ebensburg	Republican	March 4, 1927 – January 29, 1932	70th 71st 72nd	Elected in 1926. Re-elected in 1928. Re-elected in 1930. Resigned to become a member of the U.S. Board of Tax Appeals
Vacant		January 29, 1932 – April 26, 1932	72nd	
Howard W. Stull (Johnstown)	Republican	April 26, 1932 – March 3, 1933	72nd	Elected to finish Leech's term. [data missing]
Thomas C. Cochran (Mercer)	Republican	March 4, 1933 – January 3, 1935	73rd	Redistricted from the 28th district and re-elected in 1932. [data missing]
Denis J. Driscoll (St. Marys)	Democratic	January 3, 1935 – January 3, 1937	74th	Elected in 1934. [data missing]
Benjamin Jarrett (Farrell)	Republican	January 3, 1937 – January 3, 1943	75th 76th 77th	Elected in 1936. Re-elected in 1938. Re-elected in 1940. [data missing]
Leon H. Gavin (Oil City)	Republican	January 3, 1943 – January 3, 1945	78th	Elected in 1942. Redistricted to the 19th district.
Francis E. Walter (Easton)	Democratic	January 3, 1945 – January 3, 1953	79th 80th 81st 82nd	Redistricted from the 21st district and re-elected in 1944. Re-elected in 1946. Re-elected in 1948. Re-elected in 1950. Redistricted to the 15th district.
James E. Van Zandt (Altoona)	Republican	January 3, 1953 – January 3, 1963	83rd 84th 85th 86th 87th	Redistricted from the 22nd district and re-elected in 1952. Re-elected in 1954. Re-elected in 1956. Re-elected in 1958. Re-elected in 1960. [data missing]
Elmer J. Holland (Pittsburgh)	Democratic	January 3, 1963 – August 9, 1968	88th 89th 90th	Redistricted from the 30th district and re-elected in 1962. Re-elected in 1964. Re-elected in 1966. Died.
Vacant		August 9, 1968 – November 5, 1968	90th	
Joseph M. Gaydos (McKeesport)	Democratic	November 5, 1968 – January 3, 1993	90th 91st 92nd 93rd 94th 95th 96th 97th 98th 99th 100th 101st 102nd	Elected to finish Holland's term. Re-elected in 1968. Re-elected in 1970. Re-elected in 1972. Re-elected in 1974. Re-elected in 1976. Re-elected in 1978. Re-elected in 1980. Re-elected in 1982. Re-elected in 1984. Re-elected in 1986. Re-elected in 1988. Re-elected in 1990. [data missing]
Austin Murphy (Monongahela)	Democratic	January 3, 1993 – January 3, 1995	103rd	Redistricted from the 22nd district and re-elected in 1992. [data missing]
Frank Mascara (Charleroi)	Democratic	January 3, 1995 – January 3, 2003	104th 105th 106th 107th	Elected in 1994. Re-elected in 1996. Re-elected in 1998. Re-elected in 2000. Redistricted to the 18th district but moved to and lost renomination in the 12th district.
District dissolved January 3, 2003

== Recent electoral history ==
Year	Democratic			Republican			Write-ins
Year	Candidate	Votes	Pct	Candidate	Votes	Pct	Votes
1992	Austin J. Murphy	114,898	51%	Bill Townsend	111,591	49%	
1994	Frank Mascara	95,251	53%	Mike McCormick	84,156	47%	12
1996	Frank Mascara	113,394	54%	Mike McCormick	97,004	46%	4
1998	Frank Mascara	97,885	100%	(no candidate)			190
2000	Frank Mascara	145,131	64%	Ronald J. Davis	80,312	36%	

Source: "Election Statistics". Office of the Clerk of the House of Representatives.
