= Hiram L. Richmond =

American politician

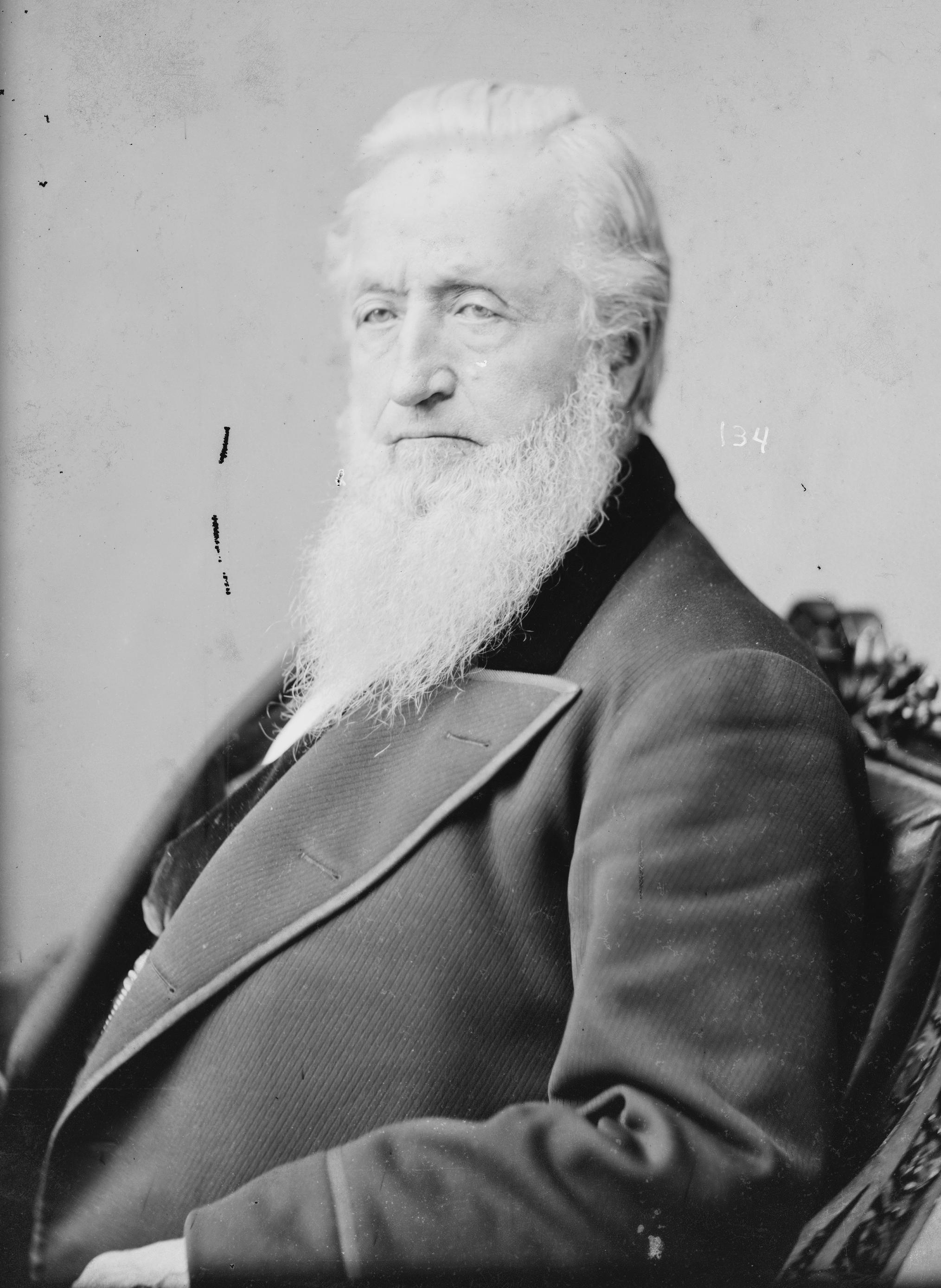

Member of the U.S. House of Representatives from Pennsylvania's 20th district
- In office March 4, 1873 – March 3, 1875
- Preceded by: Samuel Griffith
- Succeeded by: Levi A. Mackey

Personal details
- Born: May 17, 1810 Chautauqua, New York
- Died: February 19, 1885 (aged 74) Meadville, Pennsylvania
- Party: Republican; Whig (previously)
- Education: Allegheny College
- Occupation: Attorney

Hiram Lawton Richmond (May 17, 1810 – February 19, 1885) was a Republican member of the U.S. House of Representatives from Pennsylvania.

Hiram L. Richmond was born in Chautauqua, New York. He received his early education from a private instructor and in the common schools. He studied medicine two years with his father. He attended Allegheny College in Meadville, Pennsylvania, in 1834 and 1835 but did not graduate. He studied law, was admitted to the bar in 1838 and commenced the practice of law in Meadville. In early manhood was a staunch Whig but united with the Republican Party upon its organization.

Richmond was elected as a Republican to the Forty-third Congress. He was not a candidate for renomination in 1874. He served as a member of the board of trustees of Allegheny College for many years. He resumed the practice of law, and died in Meadville in 1885. Interment in Greendale Cemetery.

== Sources ==
- United States Congress. "Hiram L. Richmond (id: R000233)". Biographical Directory of the United States Congress.
- The Political Graveyard

U.S. House of Representatives
Preceded by Samuel Griffith	Member of the U.S. House of Representatives from Pennsylvania's 20th congressional district 1873–1875	Succeeded by Levi A. Mackey
