= Samuel Griffith (Pennsylvania politician) =

American politician

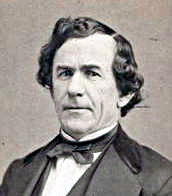

Member of the U.S. House of Representatives from Pennsylvania's 20th district
- In office March 4, 1871 – March 3, 1873
- Preceded by: Calvin Willard Gilfillan
- Succeeded by: Hiram Lawton Richmond

Personal details
- Born: February 14, 1816 Merthyr Tydfil, Glamorgan, Wales, U.K.
- Died: October 1, 1893 (aged 77) Mercer, Pennsylvania, U.S.
- Party: Democratic

Samuel Griffith (February 14, 1816 – October 1, 1893) was a Welsh-American political figure who represented Pennsylvania's 20th congressional district in the U.S. House of Representatives from March 4, 1871, to March 3, 1873.

== Biography ==
Griffith's birthplace in Wales, Merthyr Tydfil, was a booming industrial town which, at the time, was a part of the historic county of Glamorgan. He was instructed in elementary subjects by a private teacher and subsequently graduated from Allegheny College in Meadville, Pennsylvania. Following law studies, he was admitted to the bar in 1846, at the age of thirty and, over the following decades, practiced law in the Mercer County seat, Mercer.

At the age of fifty-six, he campaigned as a Democrat to represent his congressional district and was elected to the 42nd United States Congress in November 1870. After an unsuccessful reelection campaign in 1872, he resumed law practice in Mercer.

Samuel Griffith died in Mercer at the age of seventy-seven and was buried in Mercer Cemetery.

U.S. House of Representatives
Preceded by Calvin W. Gilfillan	Member of the U.S. House of Representatives from Pennsylvania's 20th congressional district 1871–1873	Succeeded by Hiram L. Richmond
