= Greendale Cemetery =

Details
- Established: 1813
- Location: Crawford County, Pennsylvania
- Coordinates: 41°38′36″N 80°08′06″W
- Type: Public
- Owned by: Greendale Cemetery Association
- Size: 200 acres (1 km^{2}))
- No. of graves: 21,000
- Website: Official Site
- Find a Grave: Greendale Cemetery

The Greendale Cemetery, in Meadville, Pennsylvania is a publicly owned, non-profit rural cemetery. Many notable people, including a Supreme Court Justice, several congressmen, soldiers, and inventors are interred in the cemetery.

== History ==
As early as 1788, in the year in which he founded the town that now bears his name, David Mead recognized the need to establish a local burial ground. In 1811, he deeded land at the present day corner of Randolph Street and Park Avenue to the Presbyterian Church. In 1813, it was enclosed by a fence. At that time, it cost $0.50 to bury an adult, $0.25 for a child, and $1.00 for a "stranger."

By the middle of the nineteenth century, the limited size of the cemetery and its location in the middle of the growing downtown district prompted the relocation of the burial ground. Several leading citizens of the community agreed to take on the task and arranged for the purchase of land parcels at the end of Randolph Street, some in Meadville itself and many in what is now West Mead Township. They were successful, and the new grounds were incorporated as the Meadville Cemetery.

On March 11, 1852, the remains in the Randolph Street Cemetery were disinterred and moved to the present-day location. Though they were placed in one large grave, the individual grave markers were also moved and may be found in a central section of Greendale.

In 1853, the area was renamed as Greendale Cemetery, and was designated as both a park and a burial ground. Though a municipal project, it had been created by private citizens for the community. In accordance with Pennsylvania law and its charter, it was to be administered by an independent board of corporators and managers elected by that board and operate on a non-profit basis as a service to area residents.

An archway was built at the cemetery's entrance in 1865 at a cost of $315. In 1874, a receiving vault was erected for $2,100. In 1875, the house originally built for the sexton in 1856 was moved within the gated area and designated the superintendent's home.

Herman Munz was hired in 1875 to plant the grounds. Today more than fifteen hundred rhododendrons decorate the grounds.

The cemetery offers lantern tours of the site during the month of October.

== Notable burials ==
- Henry Baldwin (judge) (January 14, 1780 – April 21, 1844), Associate Justice of the Supreme Court of the United States from January 18, 1830, to April 21, 1844.
- Stephen Barlow (Pennsylvania politician) (June 13, 1779 – August 24, 1845), Jacksonian member of the U.S. House of Representatives from Pennsylvania.
- Arthur Laban Bates (June 6, 1859 – August 26, 1934), U.S. Representative from the state of Pennsylvania.
- John Dick (politician) (June 17, 1794 – May 29, 1872), member of the U.S. House of Representatives from Pennsylvania.
- Samuel Bernard Dick (October 26, 1836 – May 10, 1907), Republican member of the U.S. House of Representatives from Pennsylvania.
- Mrs. A. Elmore (March 29, 1829 – October 27, 1901), temperance reformer, philanthropist, writer, editor
- Patrick Farrelly (1770 – January 12, 1826), member of the U.S. House of Representatives from Pennsylvania.
- John Wilson Farrelly (July 7, 1809 – December 20, 1860), Whig member of the U.S. House of Representatives from Pennsylvania.
- Darwin Abel Finney (August 11, 1814 – August 25, 1868), Republican member of the U.S. House of Representatives from Pennsylvania.
- Athelston Gaston (April 24, 1838 – September 23, 1907), Democratic member of the U.S. House of Representatives from Pennsylvania.
- John W. Howe (1801 – December 1, 1873), Free Soil and Whig member of the U.S. House of Representatives from Pennsylvania.
- Henry Shippen Huidekoper (July 17, 1839 – November 9, 1918), Pennsylvania soldier, author, postmaster, and businessman.
- Solomon Newton Pettis (October 10, 1827 – September 18, 1900), Republican member of the U.S. House of Representatives from Pennsylvania.
- J. Monroe Reisinger (October 28, 1842 – May 25, 1925), soldier and Medal of Honor recipient
- Hiram Lawton Richmond (May 17, 1810 – February 19, 1885), Republican member of the U.S. House of Representatives from Pennsylvania
- Gideon Sundback (April 24, 1880 – June 21, 1954), Swede-American inventor, businessman and resident of Meadville, Pennsylvania associated with the development of the zipper.

== See also ==
- List of burial places of justices of the Supreme Court of the United States
