= Levi A. Mackey =

American politician from Pennsylvania (1819–1889)

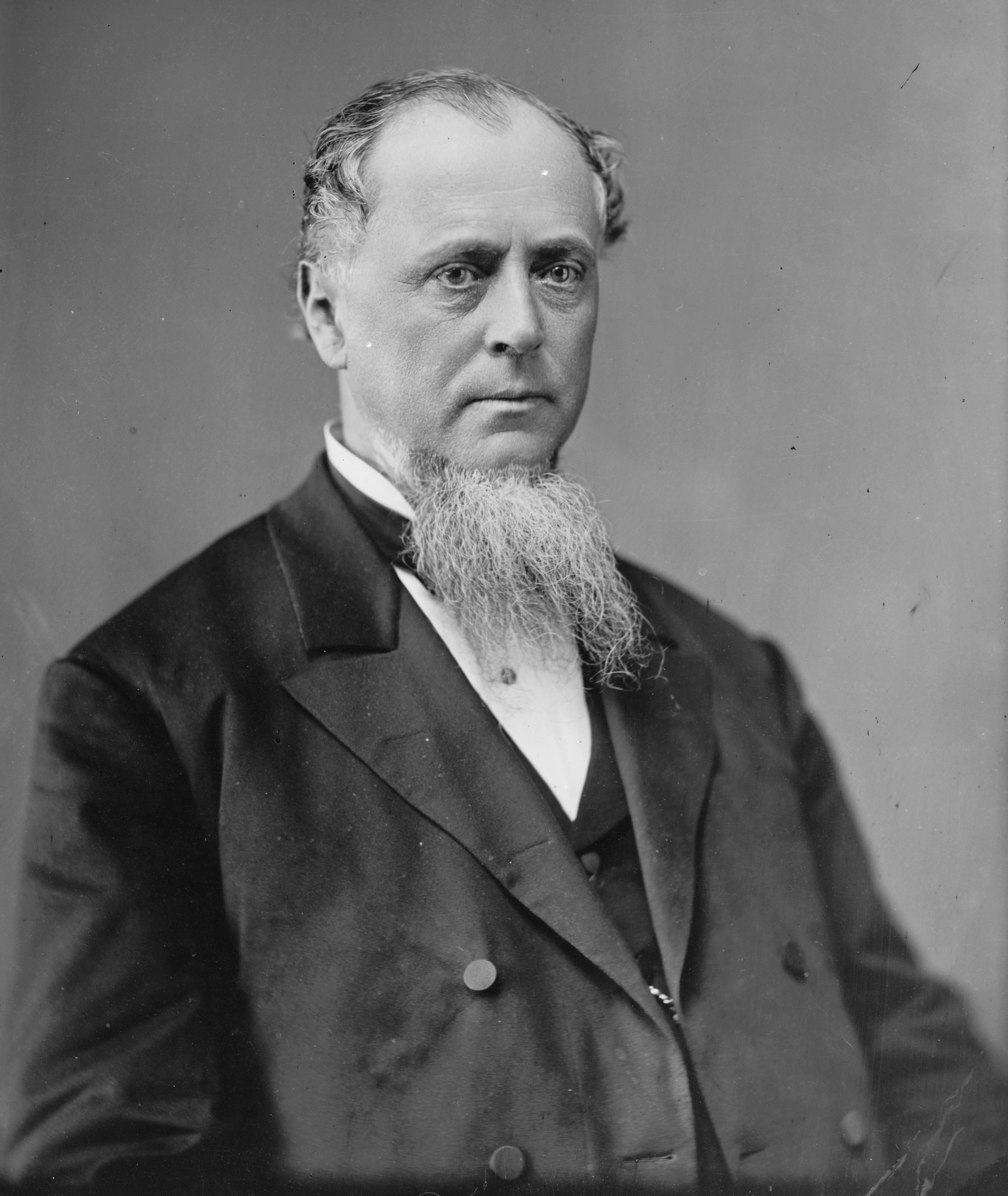

Member of the U.S. House of Representatives from Pennsylvania's 20th district
- In office March 4, 1875 – March 3, 1879
- Preceded by: Hiram L. Richmond
- Succeeded by: Seth H. Yocum

Personal details
- Born: November 25, 1819 White Deer Township, Pennsylvania
- Died: February 8, 1889 (aged 69) Lock Haven, Pennsylvania
- Party: Democratic
- Education: Union College; Dickinson College
- Occupation: Attorney, banker

Levi Augustus Mackey (November 25, 1819 – February 8, 1889) was a United States representative from Pennsylvania.

Mackey was born in White Deer Township, Union County, Pennsylvania. In 1837, he graduated from Union College in Schenectady, New York, with Phi Beta Kappa honors and membership in Kappa Alpha Society, before studying law at Dickinson College in Carlisle, Pennsylvania.

From 1841 until 1855, Mackey practiced law in Lock Haven, Pennsylvania. He then served as the president of Lock Haven Bank and as president of the Bald Eagle Valley Railroad.

Mackey served as a delegate to the 1852 Whig National Convention and to the 1872 Democratic National Convention. He campaigned, unsuccessfully, for a seat in the 41st United States Congress in 1868 but was elected mayor of Lock Haven in 1870. From March 4, 1875 to March 3, 1879 he served as a Democratic U.S. Representative to the Forty-fourth and 45th United States Congresses, representing the 20th District of Pennsylvania.

He died in Lock Haven, Pennsylvania, February 8, 1889, and was interred at Highland Cemetery in Lock Haven.

== Sources ==
- United States Congress. "Levi A. Mackey (id: M000025)". Biographical Directory of the United States Congress.
- The Political Graveyard
- Historic American Buildings Survey (HABS) documentation, filed under Lock Haven, Clinton County, PA:
  - HABS No. PA-5524, "Levi A. Mackey House", 8 photos, 16 data pages, 2 photo caption pages
  - HABS No. PA-5524-A, "Levi A. Mackey Carriage House", 6 photos, 4 data pages, 3 photo caption pages

U.S. House of Representatives
Preceded by Hiram L. Richmond	Member of the U.S. House of Representatives from Pennsylvania's 20th congressional district March 4, 1875 – March 3, 1879	Succeeded by Seth H. Yocum
