= Isaac Leet =

American politician

Member of the U.S. House of Representatives from Pennsylvania's 21st district
- In office March 4, 1839 – March 3, 1841
- Preceded by: Thomas M. T. McKennan
- Succeeded by: Joseph Lawrence

Member of the Pennsylvania Senate for the 20th district
- In office 1833–1836
- Preceded by: Jonathan Knight
- Succeeded by: John James Pearson

Member of the Pennsylvania Senate for the 17th district
- In office 1837–1838
- Preceded by: George McCulloch
- Succeeded by: John Hoge Ewing

Personal details
- Born: 1801 Washington, Pennsylvania, US
- Died: June 10, 1844 (aged 42–43) Washington, Pennsylvania, US
- Party: Democratic
- Education: Washington College

Isaac Leet (1801 – June 10, 1844) was an American politician from Pennsylvania who served as a Democratic member of the U.S. House of Representatives for Pennsylvania's 21st congressional district from 1839 to 1841.

== Biography ==
Isaac Leet was born near Washington, Pennsylvania. He graduated from Washington College (now Washington & Jefferson College) in Washington, Pennsylvania, in 1822. He studied law under Thomas McKean Thompson McKennan was admitted to the bar in 1826 and commenced practice in Washington, Pennsylvania. He served as treasurer of Washington County, Pennsylvania, from 1826 to 1830. He was deputy attorney general of Washington County from 1830 to 1834, and was a member of the Pennsylvania State Senate for the 20th district from 1833 to 1836 and the 17th district from 1837 to 1838.

Leet was elected as a Democrat to the Twenty-sixth Congress. He was an unsuccessful candidate for reelection in 1840 to the Twenty-seventh Congress. He died in Washington in 1844.

== Sources ==
- United States Congress. "Isaac Leet (id: L000211)". Biographical Directory of the United States Congress.
- The Political Graveyard

Pennsylvania State Senate
Preceded by Jonathan Knight	Member of the Pennsylvania Senate from the 20th district 1833–1836	Succeeded by John James Pearson
Preceded by George McCulloch	Member of the Pennsylvania Senate from the 17th district 1837–1838	Succeeded by John Hoge Ewing
U.S. House of Representatives
Preceded by Thomas M. T. McKennan	Member of the U.S. House of Representatives from Pennsylvania's 21st congressional district 1839–1841	Succeeded by Joseph Lawrence
