= C. William Beales =

American politician

Cyrus William Beales
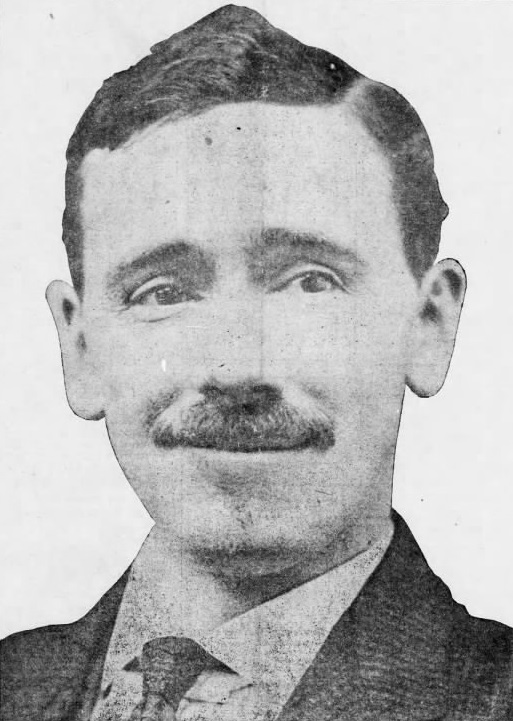
- Adams County Independent (Littlestown, PA), May 27, 1911

Member of the U.S. House of Representatives from Pennsylvania's 22nd district
- In office March 4, 1915 – March 3, 1917
- Preceded by: Andrew R. Brodbeck
- Succeeded by: Andrew R. Brodbeck

Member of the Pennsylvania Senate
- In office 1917-1921

Personal details
- Born: December 16, 1877 York Spring, Pennsylvania, U.S.
- Died: November 14, 1927 (aged 49) Gettysburg, Pennsylvania, U.S.
- Party: Republican

Cyrus William Beales (December 16, 1877 – November 14, 1927) was a Republican member of the U.S. House of Representatives from Pennsylvania.

C. William Beales was born on a farm near York Spring, Pennsylvania. At the age of thirteen, upon the death of his father, took over the operation of his father’s farm. He graduated from the pharmaceutical department of the Ohio Northern University at Ada, Ohio, in 1899. He settled at York Springs and was employed as a pharmacist. He moved to Gettysburg, Pennsylvania, in 1903 upon his appointment as mercantile appraiser of Adams County. He was clerk to the county commissioners in 1904 and 1905, and was engaged in the drug, banking, manufacturing, and printing businesses. He was the postmaster of Gettysburg from 1910 to 1914.

Beales was elected as a Republican to the Sixty-fourth Congress. He was not a candidate for renomination in 1916. He was a member of the Pennsylvania State Senate from 1917 to 1921. He remained engaged in the drug business in Gettysburg until his death in 1927. He is interred in his family plot in Evergreen Cemetery.

== Sources ==
- United States Congress. "C. William Beales (id: B000269)". Biographical Directory of the United States Congress.
- The Political Graveyard

U.S. House of Representatives
Preceded by Andrew R. Brodbeck	Member of the U.S. House of Representatives from Pennsylvania's 20th congressional district 1915 - 1917	Succeeded by Andrew R. Brodbeck
