= S. Newton Pettis =

American politician (1827–1900)

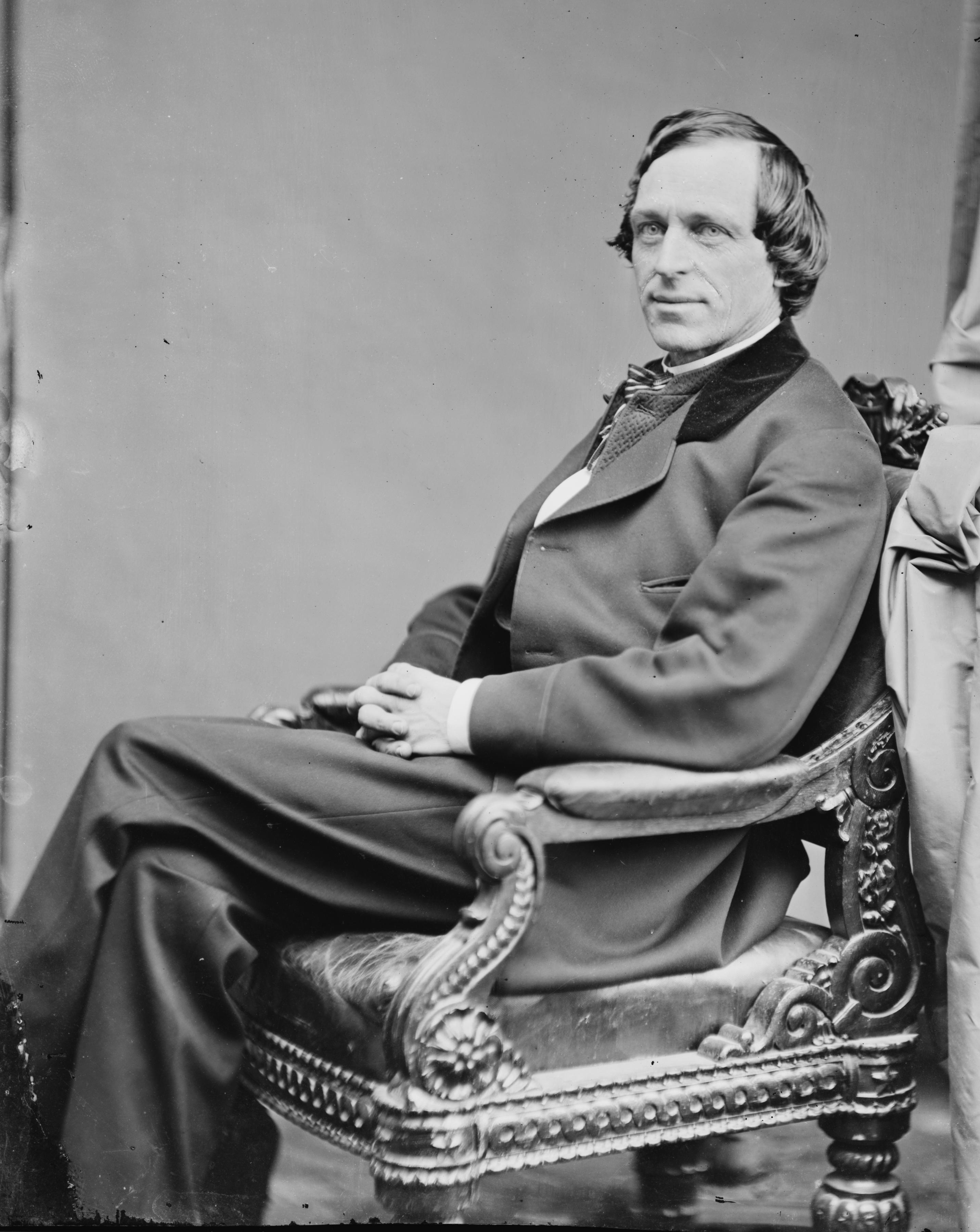
Solomon Newton Pettis

Solomon Newton Pettis (October 10, 1827 – September 18, 1900) was a Republican member of the U.S. House of Representatives from Pennsylvania.

== Early life ==
S. Newton Pettis was born in Lenox, Ohio. He studied law, was admitted to the bar in 1848 and commenced practice in Meadville, Pennsylvania. He was a delegate to the 1860 Republican National Convention.

== Public service ==
On March 21, 1861, President Lincoln appointed Pettis an associate justice of Colorado Territory, but he never really served in the position. He departed Denver some time after July 30, 1861 without ever presiding over the court he was appointed to. He remained absent until his replacement, Allen A. Bradford was appointed associate justice in June 1862. He returned to Meadville and continued to practice law.

Pettis was elected as a Republican to the Fortieth Congress to fill the vacancy caused by the death of Darwin A. Finney. He was an unsuccessful candidate for reelection in 1868. He resumed the practice of law in Meadville.

Pettis was appointed Minister to Bolivia September 4, 1878, and served until November 1, 1879. He was again engaged in the practice of law until his death in Meadville in 1900. Interment in Greendale Cemetery.

== Sources ==
- United States Congress. "S. Newton Pettis (id: P000274)". Biographical Directory of the United States Congress.
- The Political Graveyard

U.S. House of Representatives
Preceded by Darwin A. Finney	Member of the U.S. House of Representatives from Pennsylvania's 20th congressional district 1868–1869	Succeeded by Calvin W. Gilfillan
Diplomatic posts
Preceded by Robert M. Reynolds	United States Minister Resident, Bolivia; 2 June 1879 – 30 October 1879	Succeeded by Charles Adams

Political offices
Preceded by Position established	Justice of the Colorado Supreme Court; 1861–1862	Succeeded by Allen Alexander Bradford
