= Herman Eberhardt Baumer =

American politician

Member of the Pennsylvania Senate from the 35th district
- In office 1925–1936
- Preceded by: Washington Irving Stineman
- Succeeded by: John J. Haluska

Personal details
- Born: April 10, 1873 Johnstown, Pennsylvania, US
- Died: October 2, 1952 (aged 79) Johnstown, Pennsylvania, US
- Education: Harvard College (BA)

Herman Eberhardt Baumer (April 10, 1873 – October 2, 1952) was a member of the Pennsylvania State Senate, serving from 1925 to 1936.
