= List of mayors of Johnson City, Tennessee =

Johnson City, Tennessee mayors

The following is a list of mayors of Johnson City, Tennessee, United States of America.

- Henry Johnson, ca.1870
- Seth H. Yocum, ca.1885
- E. C. Reeves
- Ike I. Jobe, ca.1890
- Thomas E. Matson, ca.1892
- Henry C. Hart
- W. A. Dickenson, ca.1911
- Walter W. Faw
- W. J. Exum
- James A. Summers
- James W. Crumley
- W. J. Barton
- D. A. Vines
- Guy L. Smith Sr.
- S. E. Miller
- Charles P. Faw
- W. B. Ellison
- B. B. Snipes
- Marion Sell, ca.1937
- Sam H. Sells
- Howard Patrick, ca.1949
- T. F. Beckner Jr., ca.1953
- George Oldham, c. 1954 – 1955
- Guy Blackwell, ca.1956
- Ross H. Spears Jr., ca.1960
- Richard Machamer, ca.1970
- John Love, ca.1980
- P.C. Snapp, ca.1990
- David Phillip Roe, 2007–2009
- Jane Myron, ca.2010
- Ralph Van Brocklin, 2013-2015
- Clayton Stout, 2015-2016
- David Tomita, 2016 – 2018
- Jenny Brock, 2018 – 2020
- Joe Wise, 2020–2022
- Todd Fowler, 2022 – 2024
- John Hunter, 2024 - 2025
- Greg Cox, 2025 _ present

== See also ==
- Johnson City history
