= Henry S. Huidekoper =

Union Army officer (1839–1918)

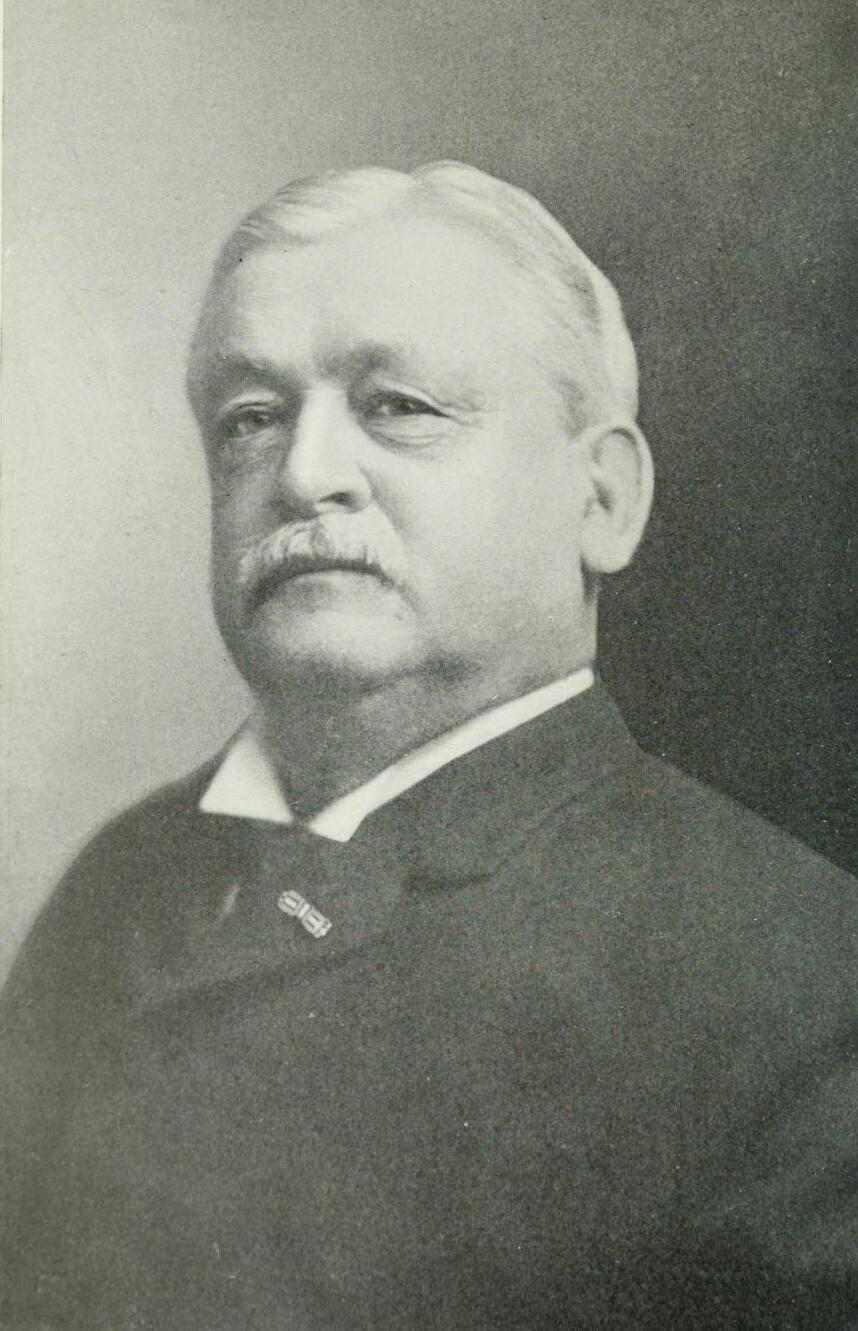
- Huidekoper in a 1914 publication
- Born: Henry Shippen Huidekoper; July 17, 1839; Meadville, Pennsylvania, U.S.
- Died: November 9, 1918 (aged 79); Philadelphia, Pennsylvania, U.S.
- Burial place: Greendale Cemetery, Meadville, Pennsylvania, U.S.
- Military career
- Allegiance: United States of America; Union
- Branch: Union Army; Pennsylvania National Guard
- Service years: 1862–1864 (Army); 1870–1880 (National Guard)
- Rank: Lieutenant Colonel (Army); Major General (National Guard)
- Unit: 150th Pennsylvania Infantry
- Conflicts: American Civil War; Battle of Gettysburg
- Awards: Medal of Honor
- Other work: Author, Postmaster, and Businessman

Henry Shippen Huidekoper (July 17, 1839 – November 9, 1918) was a Union Army lieutenant colonel from Pennsylvania who received the United States military's highest decorations for bravery, the Medal of Honor, for his actions at the Battle of Gettysburg during the American Civil War.

After graduating from Harvard, he accepted a commission as an officer in the Union Army. While fighting at the Battle of Gettysburg, he was wounded twice and had to have his arm amputated due to the wounds. For his actions during the battle, he received the Medal of Honor. He attempted to rejoin the Union Army, but was forced to resign due to his injuries. In 1870, he accepted an appointment as a major general in the Pennsylvania National Guard.

In 1877 Huidekoper was sent to help put an end to a severe railroad strike in Pennsylvania. He accepted a job as the postmaster of Philadelphia and worked for a few years in the telephone industry before becoming an overseer at Harvard College. He died in 1918 and is buried in Meadville, Pennsylvania.

== Family and education ==
Huidekoper was born in Meadville, Pennsylvania, on July 17, 1839, the son of Edgar Huidekoper and Frances (Shippen) Huidekoper and the grandson of Harm Jan Huidekoper (the founder of Meadville Theological School). He received his A.B. from Harvard College in 1862, and received his M.A. from the same college in 1872. In 1864, Huidekoper married his cousin, Emma Gertrude Evans, the daughter of Thomas Wallis Evans and Anne De Costa Yard Evans of Germantown, Philadelphia. They had one daughter, Gertrude, born in 1865, who later married Professor Munroe Smith of Columbia University, and one son, Thomas, born in 1870. His great-great-granddaughter is Meg Whitman, former CEO of eBay and candidate for Governor of California.

== Civil War and National Guard ==
After graduating from Harvard, Huidekoper served in the American Civil War as captain, lieutenant-colonel, and colonel with the 150th Pennsylvania Infantry. On July 1, 1863, while in command of his regiment at the Battle of Gettysburg, he was wounded twice, losing his right arm. He later received the Medal of Honor as a result of the action that day. According to the citation, "while engaged in repelling an attack of the enemy, [he] received a severe wound of the right arm, but instead of retiring remained at the front in command of the regiment."

Huidekoper returned to service in September 1863 but because of the severity of his wounds, he was compelled to resign from the army in 1864 at Culpeper, Virginia. He was appointed major general in the Pennsylvania National Guard by Governor John W. Geary in 1870. He helped suppress the Great Railroad Strike of 1877 under Governor John F. Hartranft, "solving at Scranton a question between the civil and military powers with such tact and firmness as to establish himself strongly in the confidence of the governor and the people."

== Later career ==
Upon reorganization of the National Guard, with Governor Hartranft as the major general, Huidekoper was appointed the senior brigadier general in the Guard. In 1879, he compiled and published a Manual of Service, which became an accepted authority on military matters. From 1880 to 1886, he was postmaster of Philadelphia, where he was credited with having organized and carried through the ounce measure for letters, instead of the former half ounce. Afterward he was employed by the Metropolitan Telephone and Telegraph Company from 1886 to 1887, and by the Bell Telephone Company from 1887 to 1913.

In 1896, Huidekoper wrote a brief reminiscence of his dealings with President Abraham Lincoln.

From 1898 to 1910, he served as one of the overseers of Harvard College. He died November 9, 1918, in a Philadelphia hospital and was buried at Greendale Cemetery, Meadville, Pennsylvania.

== Medal of Honor citation ==
Rank and organization: Lieutenant Colonel, 150th Pennsylvania Infantry. Place and date: At Gettysburg, Pa., 1 July 1863. Entered service at: Philadelphia, Pa. Born: 17 July 1839, Meadville, Pa. Date of issue: 27 May 1905.

Citation:

While engaged in repelling an attack of the enemy, received a severe wound of the right arm, but instead of retiring remained at the front in command of the regiment.

== See also ==
- List of Medal of Honor recipients for the Battle of Gettysburg
- List of American Civil War Medal of Honor recipients: G–L
