= Calvin Willard Gilfillan =

American politician

Calvin W. Gilfillan
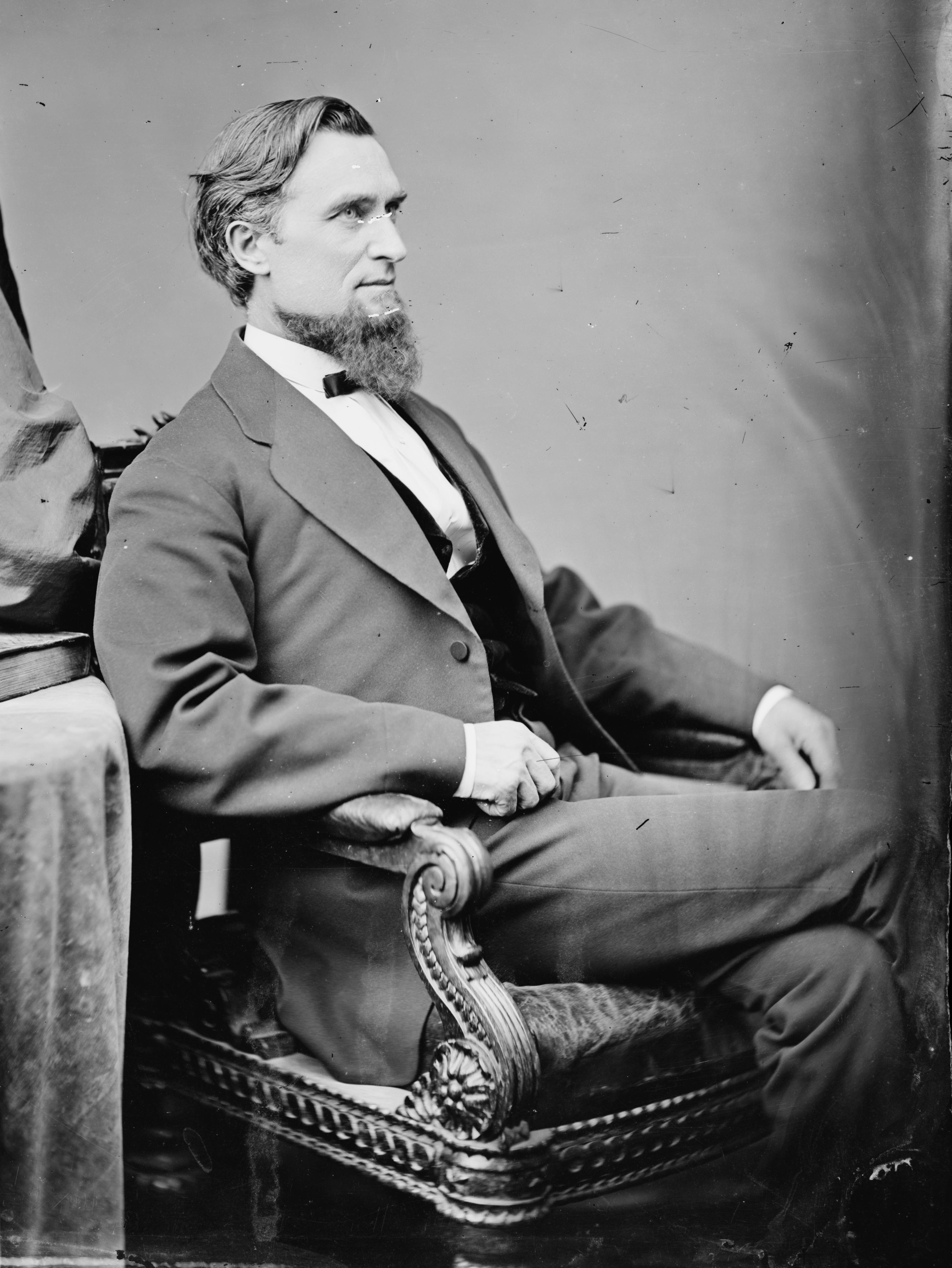

Member of the U.S. House of Representatives from Pennsylvania's 20th district
- In office March 4, 1869 – March 3, 1871
- Preceded by: Solomon Newton Pettis
- Succeeded by: Samuel Griffith

Member of the Pennsylvania House of Representatives
- In office 1859

Personal details
- Born: February 20, 1832 East Brook, Pennsylvania
- Died: December 2, 1901 (aged 69) Franklin, Pennsylvania
- Party: Republican
- Education: Westminster College

Calvin Willard Gilfillan (February 20, 1832 – December 2, 1901) was a Republican member of the U.S. House of Representatives from Pennsylvania.

== Biography ==
Calvin W. Gilfillan was born near East Brook, Lawrence County, Pennsylvania. He attended the common schools and graduated from Westminster College in New Wilmington, Pennsylvania. He served as superintendent of schools of Mercer County, Pennsylvania, for two terms. He served as clerk of the Pennsylvania State House of Representatives in 1859. He studied law, was admitted to the bar in 1859 and commenced practice in Mercer, Pennsylvania. He was appointed prosecuting attorney for Venango County, Pennsylvania, in 1861 and elected in 1862 for three years.

Gilfillan was elected as a Republican to the Forty-first Congress. He was an unsuccessful candidate for reelection in 1870. He practiced law until 1873. He was later engaged in banking and was a delegate to the 1872 Republican National Convention. He died in Franklin, Pennsylvania, in 1901. Interment in the Franklin Cemetery.

== Sources ==
- United States Congress. "Calvin Willard Gilfillan (id: G000185)". Biographical Directory of the United States Congress.
- The Political Graveyard

U.S. House of Representatives
Preceded by S. Newton Pettis	Member of the U.S. House of Representatives from Pennsylvania's 20th congressional district 1869–1871	Succeeded by Samuel Griffith
