= South Fork, Pennsylvania =

Borough in Pennsylvania, US

- Borough
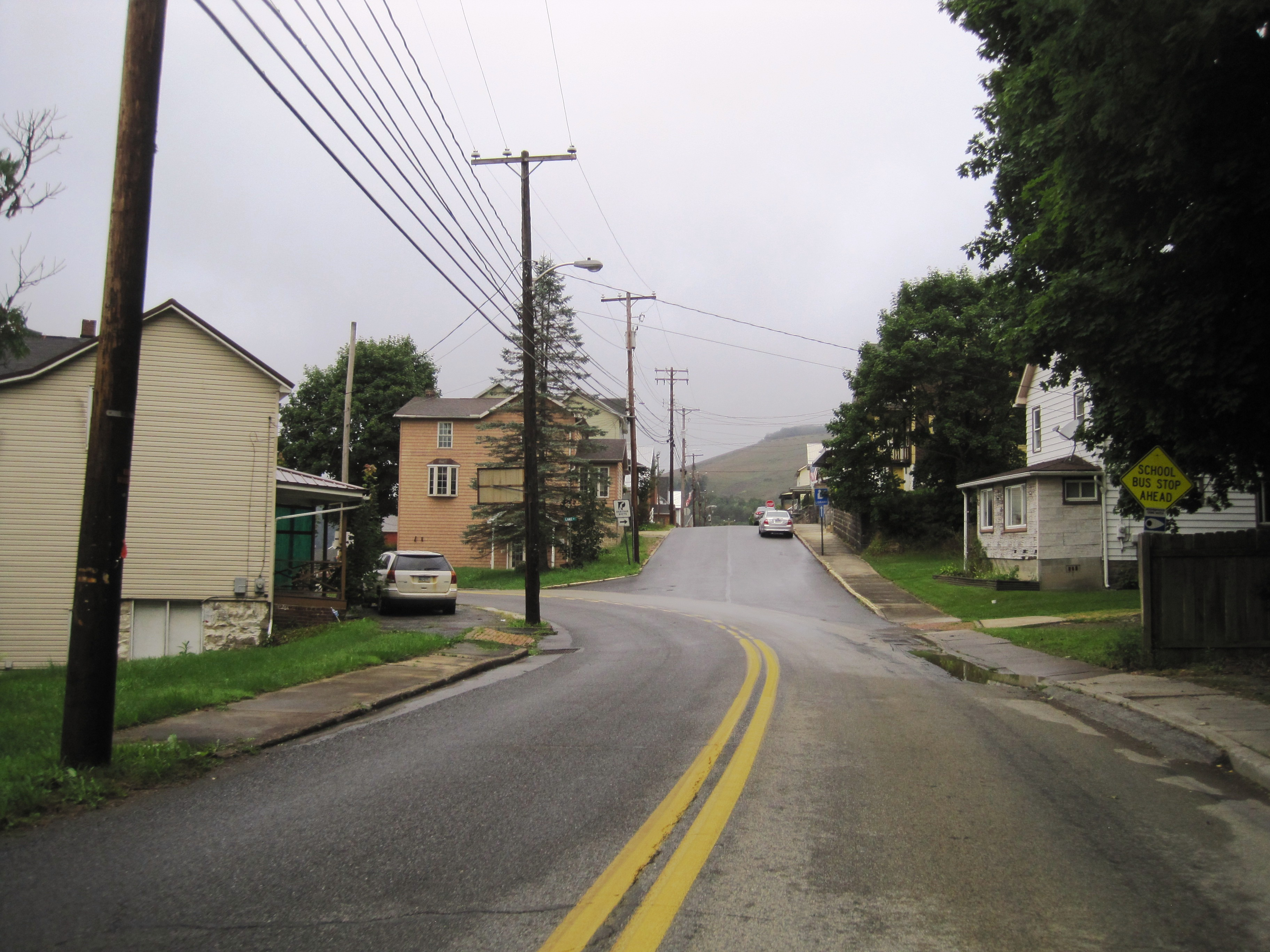
- Lake Street and Main Street in South Fork

- Location of South Fork in Cambria County, Pennsylvania.

- Location within Pennsylvania Location within the United States
- Coordinates: 40°21′54″N 78°47′26″W
- Country: United States
- State: Pennsylvania
- County: Cambria
- Incorporated: 1887

Government
  - Type: Borough council

Area
  - Total: 0.50 sq mi (1.30 km^{2})
  - Land: 0.47 sq mi (1.22 km^{2})
  - Water: 0.027 sq mi (0.07 km^{2})
- Elevation: 1,503 ft (458 m)

Population (2010)
  - Total: 928
  - Estimate (2019): 842
  - Density: 1,784.3/sq mi (688.91/km^{2})
- Time zone: UTC-5 (Eastern (EST))
  - Summer (DST): UTC-4 (EDT)
- ZIP code: 15956
- Area code: 814
- FIPS code: 42-72168
- GNIS feature ID: 1215034

South Fork is a borough in Cambria County, Pennsylvania, United States. It is part of the Johnstown, Pennsylvania Metropolitan Statistical Area. As of the 2020 census, South Fork had a population of 954.

== Geography ==
South Fork is located in south-central Cambria County at 40°21′54″N 78°47′26″W (40.365042, -78.790474), in the valley of the Little Conemaugh River at the confluence of its South Fork. U.S. Route 219, a four-lane expressway, passes just east of the borough and leads 10 miles (16 km) north to Ebensburg, the Cambria County seat. Johnstown is 10 miles (16 km) to the southwest, and Altoona is approximately 30 miles (48 km) to the northeast.

According to the United States Census Bureau, the borough of South Fork has a total area of 0.50 square miles (1.30 km^{2}), of which 0.47 square miles (1.22 km^{2}) is land and 0.027 square miles (0.07 km^{2}), or 5.74%, is water.

== Demographics ==
Historical population
Census	Pop.	Note	%±
1890	1,295		—
1900	2,635		103.5%
1910	4,592		74.3%
1920	4,239		−7.7%
1930	3,227		−23.9%
1940	3,023		−6.3%
1950	2,616		−13.5%
1960	2,053		−21.5%
1970	1,661		−19.1%
1980	1,401		−15.7%
1990	1,197		−14.6%
2000	1,138		−4.9%
2010	928		−18.5%
2020	954		2.8%

As of the census of 2000, there were 1,138 people, 452 households, and 311 families residing in the borough. The population density was 2,208.1 inhabitants per square mile (852.6/km^{2}). There were 484 housing units at an average density of 939.1 per square mile (362.6/km^{2}). The racial makeup of the borough was 99.74% White, 0.09% African American, and 0.18% from two or more races. Hispanic or Latino of any race were 0.62% of the population.

There were 452 households, out of which 31.0% had children under the age of 18 living with them, 50.7% were married couples living together, 13.9% had a female householder with no husband present, and 31.0% were non-families. 29.0% of all households were made up of individuals, and 16.2% had someone living alone who was 65 years of age or older. The average household size was 2.50 and the average family size was 3.07.

In the borough the population was spread out, with 24.9% under the age of 18, 8.9% from 18 to 24, 27.9% from 25 to 44, 19.9% from 45 to 64, and 18.5% who were 65 years of age or older. The median age was 37 years. For every 100 females there were 97.9 males. For every 100 females age 18 and over, there were 93.0 males.

The median income for a household in the borough was $30,144, and the median income for a family was $34,531. Males had a median income of $25,375 versus $16,563 for females. The per capita income for the borough was $13,298. About 11.1% of families and 12.0% of the population were below the poverty line, including 21.8% of those under age 18 and 5.5% of those age 65 or over.

== Notable people ==
- Washington Irving Stineman (1869–1947), member of the Pennsylvania Senate
- Sara Evelyn Stein Smith (1907-2005), Detroit public school educator, patron of the arts, and builder of Myhaven (1950 Usonian house designed by Frank Lloyd Wright).

== See also ==
- Johnstown Flood
