= Washington Irving Stineman =

American politician (1869–1947)

Member of the Pennsylvania Senate from the 35th district
- In office 1921–1924
- Succeeded by: Herman Eberhardt Baumer

Personal details
- Born: August 23, 1869 South Fork, Pennsylvania, U.S.
- Died: September 29, 1947 (aged 78) Johnstown, Pennsylvania, U.S.
- Resting place: Lloyd Cemetery; Ebensburg, Pennsylvania, U.S.
- Party: Republican
- Spouse: Nannie M. James (m. 1893)
- Children: 2
- Parent: Jacob C. Stineman (father)
- Education: Central Pennsylvania College
- Occupation: Politician; coal businessman

Washington Irving Stineman (August 23, 1869 – September 29, 1947) was an American politician from Pennsylvania. He served in the Pennsylvania Senate from 1921 to 1924.

== Early life ==
Washington Irving Stineman was born on August 23, 1869, in South Fork, Pennsylvania, to Mary Eleanor (née Varner) and Jacob C. Stineman. His father was a state senator. He was educated at public schools in South Fork. He attended Central Pennsylvania College, but left in his sophomore year.

== Career ==
Stineman helped organize and later served as general manager of Stineman Coal and Coke Company in 1893. He was treasurer of Stineman Brothers and director and treasurer of Euclid Coal and Coke Company.

Stineman was elected as a Republican to the Pennsylvania Senate, representing district 35, from 1921 to 1924. He served on the appropriations, canals and inland navigation, congressional apportionment, exposition affairs, forestry, judicial apportionment, mines and mining, new counties and county seats, public roads and highways, and public supply of light, heat, and water committees.

Stineman was president of the South Fork National Bank for 34 years. He was president of the South Fork Fire Brick Company and served as president of the Stineman Coal Mining Company up until his death. He was a Mason and was a member of the Old Colony Club of New York, Pennsylvania Society, Sunnehanna Country Club and the Elks.

== Personal life ==
Stineman married Nannie M. James of Ebensburg in 1893. They had two sons, James Calvin and Frank H.

Stineman died following a heart attack on September 29, 1947, at his home in Johnstown. He is buried in Lloyd Cemetery in Ebensburg.
