= Jacob C. Stineman =

American politician (1842–1913)

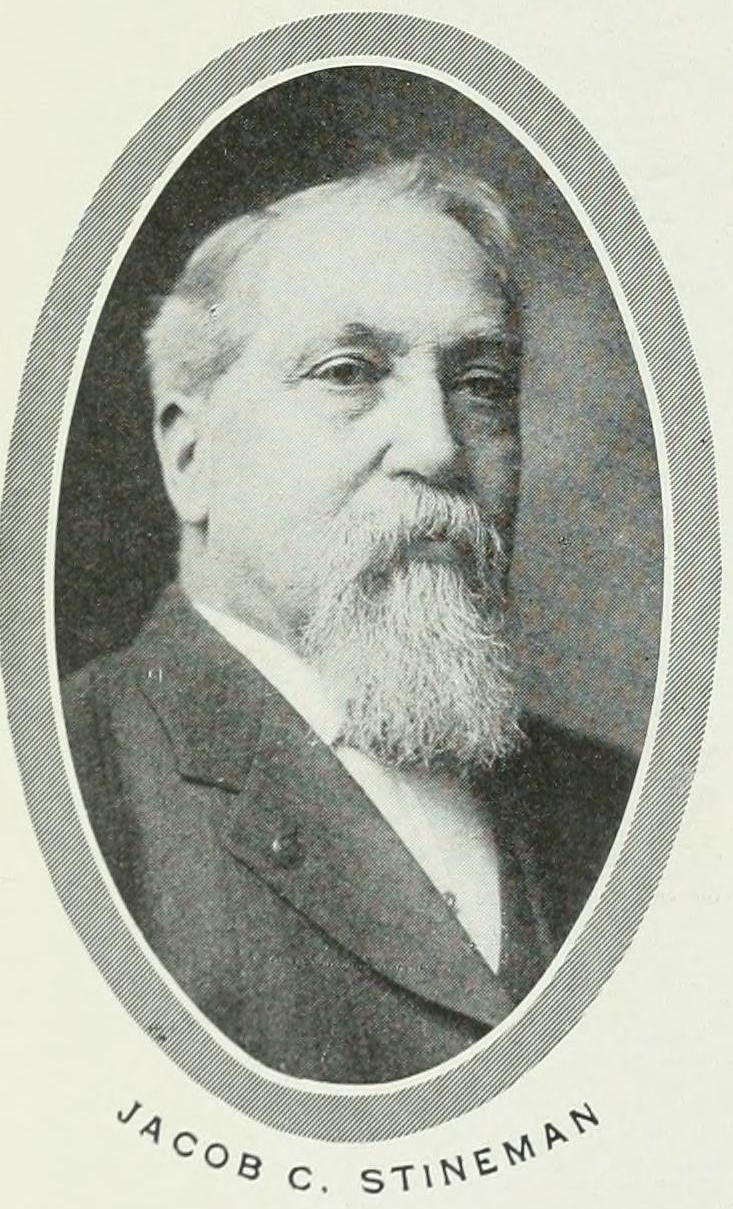
- Stineman in a 1914 publication

Member of the Pennsylvania Senate from the 35th district
- In office 1913 – April 4, 1913
- In office 1896–1908

Member of the Pennsylvania House of Representatives from the Cambria County district
- In office 1893–1896

Personal details
- Born: Jacob Croyle Stineman; April 9, 1842 Adams Township, Cambria County, Pennsylvania, U.S.
- Died: April 2, 1913 (aged 70) South Fork, Pennsylvania, U.S.
- Resting place: South Fork Cemetery; South Fork, Pennsylvania, U.S.
- Party: Republican (before 1913); Democratic
- Spouse: Ellen Varner (m. 1866; died 1910)
- Children: 8, including Washington
- Occupation: Politician; farmer; coal businessman; educator

Jacob Croyle Stineman (April 9, 1842 – April 2, 1913) was an American politician from Pennsylvania. He served as a member of the Pennsylvania House of Representatives from 1893 to 1896 and in the Pennsylvania Senate from 1896 to 1908 and in 1913.

== Early life ==
Jacob Croyle Stineman was born on April 9, 1842, in Richland Township (later Adams Township), Cambria County, Pennsylvania, to Elizabeth (née Croyle) and Jacob Stineman. He grew up on his father's farm and attended public schools. At the age of 16, he became a teacher and taught at a school on Frankstown Road in Adams Township for four years.

== Career ==
Following the Confederate Army entering Pennsylvania in 1863, Stineman served two months in the state militia. He later enlisted in the Union Army and attained the rank of sergeant in Company F of the 198th Pennsylvania Infantry Regiment in the Civil War. He served in the army from 1864 to 1865. He was at the surrender of General Lee at Appomattox. He then worked as a farmer and took up coal mining. He became a mine boss and then became superintendent of the mines. In 1873, he acquired Stineman Coal Mining Company, it included holdings of the Stineman Coal and Coke Company, the Maryland Coal Company at St. Michael, the H. C. Stineman Coal Company, and the O. M. Stineman Coal Company. He served as president of the Stineman Coal and Coke Company and was director of the Stineman Coal Mining Company, the South Fork Fire Brick Company, the South Fork Water Company, the Title, Trust, and Guarantee Company of Johnstown, the Second National Bank of Altoona, and the Record Publishing Company of South Fork. He was president of the First National Bank of South Fork. He was school director in South Fork for 15 years.

Stineman ran for sheriff of Cambria County unsuccessfully in 1885. He was later elected as county sheriff and served from 1888 to 1890. In 1889 he became the chairman of the Cambria County Republican Committee. He was a delegate to the 1889 Republican State Convention. He was elected as a Republican to the Pennsylvania House of Representatives, representing Cambria County, and served from 1893 to 1896. He did not run for re-election in 1896. He was elected to the Pennsylvania Senate as a Republican, representing the 35th district, serving from 1896 to 1908. He was elected to the senate again in 1913 on a Washington and Democratic ticket. He served until his death. During his first tenure in the senate, he served as chairman of the public grounds and buildings committee and served on the corporations, forestry, legislative apportionment, military affairs and railroad committees. In 1913, he served as chairman of the library committee and served on the appropriations, congressional apportionment, corporations, finance, legislative apportionment, mines and mining, and public supply of light, heat, and water committees. In 1907, he was appointed by Governor Edwin Sydney Stuart as a member of the Gettysburg Memorial Commission. He served as a presidential elector for President Taft in 1908.

Stineman was director of the Citizen's National Bank of Johnstown. He taught Sunday school and was a member of the board of trustees of Albright College in Myerstown. He founded the Daniel T. Stineman Post. No. 560 of the Grand Army of the Republic of South Fork. It was named in honor of his brother who died at Battle of Hatcher's Run. He was also a member of Cambria Lodge, No. 278 Free and Accepted Masons, South Fork Lodge, No. 101, Knights of Pythias, the Independent Order of Odd Fellows and the Junior Order of United American Mechanics.

== Personal life ==
Stineman married Ellen Varner, daughter of Samuel Varner, of Richland Township on December 20, 1866. They had eight children, Nora Lucretia, Albert Meade, Washington Irving, Oliver Morton, Jacob Wilbur, Nettie May, Harvey Cameron and Lillie Blanche. His wife died in 1910. His son Washington Irving served in the Pennsylvania Senate. He owned a house and spent his summers in Orlando, Florida.

Stineman died of erysipelas on April 2, 1913, at his home in South Fork. He was interred at South Fork Cemetery.
