= List of former United States representatives (G) =

This is a complete list of former United States representatives whose last names begin with the letter G.

== Number of years and terms the member has served ==
The number of years the representative/delegate has served in Congress indicates the number of terms the representative/delegate has. Note the representative/delegate can also serve non-consecutive terms if the representative/delegate loses election and wins re-election to the House.

- 2 years - 1 or 2 terms
- 4 years - 2 or 3 terms
- 6 years - 3 or 4 terms
- 8 years - 4 or 5 terms
- 10 years - 5 or 6 terms
- 12 years - 6 or 7 terms
- 14 years - 7 or 8 terms
- 16 years - 8 or 9 terms
- 18 years - 9 or 10 terms
- 20 years - 10 or 11 terms
- 22 years - 11 or 12 terms
- 24 years - 12 or 13 terms
- 26 years - 13 or 14 terms
- 28 years - 14 or 15 terms
- 30 years - 15 or 16 terms
- 32 years - 16 or 17 terms
- 34 years - 17 or 18 terms
- 36 years - 18 or 19 terms
- 38 years - 19 or 20 terms
- 40 years - 20 or 21 terms
- 42 years - 21 or 22 terms
- 44 years - 22 or 23 terms
- 46 years - 23 or 24 terms
- 48 years - 24 or 25 terms
- 50 years - 25 or 26 terms
- 52 years - 26 or 27 terms
- 54 years - 27 or 28 terms
- 56 years - 28 or 29 terms
- 58 years - 29 or 30 terms

Name	Term	State/ Territory	Party	Lifespan
Isauro Gabaldon	1920–1928	Philippines	None	1875–1942
Tulsi Gabbard	2013–2021	Hawaii	Democratic	1981–present
Matt Gaetz	2017–2024	Florida	Republican	1982–present
Joshua Gage	1817–1819	Massachusetts	Democratic-Republican	1763–1831
Harry C. Gahn	1921–1923	Ohio	Republican	1880–1962
John P. Gaines	1847–1849	Kentucky	Whig	1795–1857
John W. Gaines	1897–1909	Tennessee	Democratic	1860–1926
Joseph H. Gaines	1901–1911	West Virginia	Republican	1864–1951
William E. Gaines	1887–1889	Virginia	Republican	1844–1912
Nathan Gaither	1829–1833	Kentucky	Democratic	1788–1862
John Galbraith	1833–1837; 1839–1841	Pennsylvania	Democratic	1794–1860
George Gale	1789–1791	Maryland	Pro-Administration	1756–1815
Levin Gale	1827–1829	Maryland	Democratic	1784–1834
Richard P. Gale	1941–1945	Minnesota	Republican	1900–1973
Nick Galifianakis	1967–1973	North Carolina	Democratic	1928–2023
Neil Gallagher	1959–1973	New Jersey	Democratic	1921–2018
James A. Gallagher	1943–1945; 1947–1949	Pennsylvania	Republican	1869–1957
Mike Gallagher	2017–2024	Wisconsin	Republican	1984–present
Thomas Gallagher	1909–1921	Illinois	Democratic	1850–1930
William Gallagher	1945–1946	Minnesota	Democratic-Farmer-Labor	1875–1946
Albert Gallatin	1795–1801	Pennsylvania	Democratic-Republican	1761–1849
Elton Gallegly	1987–2013	California	Republican	1944–present
Pete Gallego	2013–2015	Texas	Democratic	1961–present
Ruben Gallego	2015–2025	Arizona	Democratic	1979–present
José Manuel Gallegos	1853–1856; 1871–1873	New Mexico	Democratic	1815–1875
Jacob H. Gallinger	1885–1889	New Hampshire	Republican	1837–1918
James A. Gallivan	1914–1928	Massachusetts	Democratic	1866–1928
Dean Gallo	1985–1994	New Jersey	Republican	1935–1994
Samuel Galloway	1855–1857	Ohio	Oppositionist	1811–1872
Albert Gallup	1837–1839	New York	Democratic	1796–1851
James Gamble	1851–1855	Pennsylvania	Democratic	1809–1883
John Rankin Gamble	1891	South Dakota	Republican	1848–1891
Ralph A. Gamble	1937–1957	New York	Republican	1885–1959
Robert J. Gamble	1895–1897; 1899–1901	South Dakota	Republican	1851–1924
Roger L. Gamble	1833–1835	Georgia	Democratic	1787–1847
Roger L. Gamble	1841–1843	Georgia	Whig	1787–1847
Stephen Warfield Gambrill	1924–1938	Maryland	Democratic	1873–1938
Robert Gammage	1977–1979	Texas	Democratic	1938–2012
Harry Gandy	1915–1921	South Dakota	Democratic	1881–1957
James V. Ganly	1919–1921; 1923	New York	Democratic	1878–1923
Barzillai Gannett	1809–1812	Massachusetts	Democratic-Republican	1764–1832
Greg Ganske	1995–2003	Iowa	Republican	1949–present
John Ganson	1863–1865	New York	Democratic	1818–1874
Martin K. Gantz	1891–1893	Ohio	Democratic	1862–1916
Harvey C. Garber	1903–1907	Ohio	Democratic	1866–1938
Jacob A. Garber	1929–1931	Virginia	Republican	1879–1953
Milton C. Garber	1923–1933	Oklahoma	Republican	1867–1948
Joe Garcia	2013–2015	Florida	Democratic	1963–present
Mike Garcia	2020–2025	California	Republican	1976–present
Robert Garcia	1978–1990	New York	Democratic	1933–2017
Warren Gard	1913–1921	Ohio	Democratic	1873–1929
Barent Gardenier	1807–1811	New York	Federalist	1776–1822
Augustus P. Gardner	1902–1917	Massachusetts	Republican	1865–1918
Cory Gardner	2011–2015	Colorado	Republican	1974–present
Edward J. Gardner	1945–1947	Ohio	Democratic	1898–1950
Francis Gardner	1807–1809	New Hampshire	Democratic-Republican	1771–1835
Frank Gardner	1923–1929	Indiana	Democratic	1872–1937
Gideon Gardner	1809–1811	Massachusetts	Democratic-Republican	1759–1832
Jim Gardner	1967–1969	North Carolina	Republican	1933–present
John J. Gardner	1893–1913	New Jersey	Republican	1845–1921
Mills Gardner	1877–1879	Ohio	Republican	1830–1910
Washington Gardner	1899–1911	Michigan	Republican	1845–1928
James A. Garfield	1863–1880	Ohio	Republican	1831–1881
Selucius Garfielde	1869–1873	Washington	Republican	1822-1883
David S. Garland	1810–1811	Virginia	Democratic-Republican	1769–1841
James Garland	1835–1839	Virginia	Democratic	1791–1885
James Garland	1839–1841	Virginia	Conservative	1791–1885
Mahlon M. Garland	1915–1920	Pennsylvania	Republican	1856–1920
Peter A. Garland	1961–1963	Maine	Republican	1923–2005
Rice Garland	1834–1837	Louisiana	National Republican	c. 1795–1861
Rice Garland	1837–1840	Louisiana	Whig	c. 1795–1861
Edward Garmatz	1947–1973	Maryland	Democratic	1903–1986
Alfred B. Garner	1909–1911	Pennsylvania	Republican	1873–1930
John Nance Garner	1903–1933	Texas	Democratic	1868–1967
James M. Garnett	1805–1809	Virginia	Democratic-Republican	1770–1843
Muscoe R. H. Garnett	1856–1861	Virginia	Democratic	1821–1864
Robert S. Garnett	1817–1825	Virginia	Democratic-Republican	1789–1840
Robert S. Garnett	1825–1827	Virginia	Democratic	1789–1840
Daniel G. Garnsey	1825–1829	New York	National Republican	1779–1851
Abraham Ellison Garrett	1871–1873	Tennessee	Democratic	1830–1907
Clyde L. Garrett	1937–1941	Texas	Democratic	1885–1959
Daniel E. Garrett	1913–1915; 1917–1919; 1921–1932	Texas	Democratic	1869–1932
Finis J. Garrett	1905–1929	Tennessee	Democratic	1875–1956
Scott Garrett	2003–2017	New Jersey	Republican	1959–present
Tom Garrett	2017–2019	Virginia	Republican	1972–present
Daniel Garrison	1823–1825	New Jersey	Democratic-Republican	1782–1851
Daniel Garrison	1825–1827	New Jersey	Democratic	1782–1851
George T. Garrison	1881–1883; 1884–1885	Virginia	Democratic	1835–1889
Nathaniel Garrow	1827–1829	New York	Democratic	1780–1841
William Willis Garth	1877–1879	Alabama	Democratic	1828–1912
Fred C. Gartner	1939–1941	Pennsylvania	Republican	1896–1972
Lucius J. Gartrell	1857–1861	Georgia	Democratic	1821–1891
William S. Garvin	1845–1847	Pennsylvania	Democratic	1806–1883
J. Vaughan Gary	1945–1965	Virginia	Democratic	1892–1973
Allard H. Gasque	1923–1938	South Carolina	Democratic	1873–1938
Elizabeth Hawley Gasque	1938–1939	South Carolina	Democratic	1886–1989
Percy Lee Gassaway	1935–1937	Oklahoma	Democratic	1885–1937
Athelston Gaston	1899–1901	Pennsylvania	Democratic	1838–1907
William Gaston	1813–1817	North Carolina	Federalist	1778–1844
Seth Merrill Gates	1839–1843	New York	Whig	1800–1877
Ezekiel C. Gathings	1939–1969	Arkansas	Democratic	1903–1979
Alfred Moore Gatlin	1823–1825	North Carolina	Democratic-Republican	1790–1841
Lucien C. Gause	1875–1879	Arkansas	Democratic	1836–1880
Joseph A. Gavagan	1929–1943	New York	Democratic	1892–1968
Leon H. Gavin	1943–1963	Pennsylvania	Republican	1893–1963
Edward J. Gay	1885–1889	Louisiana	Democratic	1816–1889
Joseph M. Gaydos	1968–1993	Pennsylvania	Democratic	1926–2015
John Gayle	1847–1849	Alabama	Whig	1792–1859
June W. Gayle	1900–1901	Kentucky	Democratic	1865–1942
James M. Gaylord	1851–1853	Ohio	Democratic	1811–1874
James W. Gazlay	1823–1825	Ohio	Democratic-Republican	1784–1874
John H. Gear	1887–1891; 1893–1895	Iowa	Republican	1825–1900
Bertrand W. Gearhart	1935–1949	California	Republican	1890–1955
Thomas J. Geary	1890–1895	California	Democratic	1854–1929
John Gebhard	1821–1823	New York	Federalist	1782–1854
George W. Geddes	1879–1887	Ohio	Democratic	1824–1892
James Geddes	1813–1815	New York	Federalist	1763–1838
James P. Geelan	1945–1947	Connecticut	Democratic	1901–1982
Bernard J. Gehrmann	1935–1943	Wisconsin	Progressive	1880–1958
Jacob A. Geissenhainer	1889–1895	New Jersey	Democratic	1839–1917
Sam Gejdenson	1981–2001	Connecticut	Democratic	1948–present
George Gekas	1983–2003	Pennsylvania	Republican	1930–2021
L. M. Gensman	1921–1923	Oklahoma	Republican	1878–1954
Brady P. Gentry	1953–1957	Texas	Democratic	1896–1966
Meredith Poindexter Gentry	1839–1843; 1845–1853	Tennessee	Whig	1809–1866
Henry George Jr.	1911–1915	New York	Democratic	1862–1916
Melvin C. George	1881–1885	Oregon	Republican	1849-1933
Myron V. George	1950–1959	Kansas	Republican	1900–1972
Newell A. George	1959–1961	Kansas	Democratic	1904–1992
Dick Gephardt	1977–2005	Missouri	Democratic	1941–present
Elmer H. Geran	1923–1925	New Jersey	Democratic	1875–1954
Pete Geren	1989–1997	Texas	Democratic	1952–present
Charles L. Gerlach	1939–1947	Pennsylvania	Republican	1895–1947
Jim Gerlach	2003–2015	Pennsylvania	Republican	1955–present
Fred B. Gernerd	1921–1923	Pennsylvania	Republican	1879–1948
Elbridge Gerry	1789–1793	Massachusetts	Anti-Administration	1744–1814
Elbridge Gerry	1849–1851	Maine	Democratic	1813–1886
James Gerry	1839–1843	Pennsylvania	Democratic	1796–1873
Peter G. Gerry	1913–1915	Rhode Island	Democratic	1879–1957
William H. Gest	1887–1891	Illinois	Republican	1838–1912
Thomas S. Gettys	1964–1974	South Carolina	Democratic	1912–2003
James Lawrence Getz	1867–1873	Pennsylvania	Democratic	1821–1891
Lee E. Geyer	1939–1941	California	Democratic	1888–1941
James Gholson	1833–1835	Virginia	National Republican	1798–1848
Samuel J. Gholson	1836–1838	Mississippi	Democratic	1808–1883
Thomas Gholson Jr.	1808–1816	Virginia	Democratic-Republican	c. 1780–1816
Robert Giaimo	1959–1981	Connecticut	Democratic	1919–2006
Greg Gianforte	2017–2021	Montana	Republican	1961–present
Jim Gibbons	1997–2006	Nevada	Republican	1944–present
Sam Gibbons	1963–1997	Florida	Democratic	1920–2012
Bob Gibbs	2011–2023	Ohio	Republican	1954–present
Florence R. Gibbs	1940–1941	Georgia	Democratic	1890–1964
W. Benjamin Gibbs	1939–1940	Georgia	Democratic	1889–1940
Charles Hopper Gibson	1885–1891	Maryland	Democratic	1842–1900
Chris Gibson	2011–2017	New York	Republican	1964–present
Ernest Willard Gibson	1923–1933	Vermont	Republican	1872–1940
Eustace Gibson	1883–1887	West Virginia	Democratic	1842–1900
Henry R. Gibson	1895–1905	Tennessee	Republican	1837–1938
James K. Gibson	1870–1871	Virginia	Conservative	1812–1879
John S. Gibson	1941–1947	Georgia	Democratic	1893–1960
Randall L. Gibson	1875–1883	Louisiana	Democratic	1832–1892
De Witt C. Giddings	1872–1875; 1877–1879	Texas	Democratic	1827–1903
Joshua Reed Giddings	1838–1842; 1842–1849	Ohio	Whig	1795–1864
Joshua Reed Giddings	1849–1855	Ohio	Free Soiler	1795–1864
Joshua Reed Giddings	1855–1857	Ohio	Oppositionist	1795–1864
Joshua Reed Giddings	1857–1859	Ohio	Republican	1795–1864
Napoleon B. Giddings	1855	Nebraska	Democratic	1816–1897
Charles L. Gifford	1922–1947	Massachusetts	Republican	1871–1947
Oscar S. Gifford	1885–1889; 1889–1891	Dakota; South Dakota	Republican	1842–1913
Gabby Giffords	2007–2012	Arizona	Democratic	1970–present
Edward Gilbert	1850–1851	California	Democratic	c. 1819–1852
Ezekiel Gilbert	1793–1795	New York	Pro-Administration	1756–1841
Ezekiel Gilbert	1795–1797	New York	Federalist	1756–1841
George G. Gilbert	1899–1907	Kentucky	Democratic	1849–1909
Jacob H. Gilbert	1960–1971	New York	Democratic	1920–1981
Newton W. Gilbert	1905–1906	Indiana	Republican	1862–1939
Ralph Waldo Emerson Gilbert	1921–1929; 1931–1933	Kentucky	Democratic	1882–1939
Sylvester Gilbert	1818–1819	Connecticut	Democratic-Republican	1755–1846
William A. Gilbert	1855–1857	New York	Oppositionist	1815–1875
Wayne Gilchrest	1991–2009	Maryland	Republican	1946–present
Fred C. Gilchrist	1931–1945	Iowa	Republican	1868–1950
James H. Gildea	1935–1939	Pennsylvania	Democratic	1890–1988
William Branch Giles	1790–1795	Virginia	Anti-Administration	1762–1830
William Branch Giles	1795–1798; 1801–1803	Virginia	Democratic-Republican	1762–1830
William F. Giles	1845–1847	Maryland	Democratic	1807–1879
Calvin W. Gilfillan	1869–1871	Pennsylvania	Republican	1832–1901
John Gilfillan	1885–1887	Minnesota	Republican	1835–1924
Clarence C. Gilhams	1906–1909	Indiana	Republican	1860–1912
John Gill Jr.	1905–1911	Maryland	Democratic	1850–1918
Joseph J. Gill	1899–1903	Ohio	Republican	1846–1920
Michael Joseph Gill	1914–1915	Missouri	Democratic	1864-1918
Patrick F. Gill	1909–1911; 1912–1913	Missouri	Democratic	1868–1923
Thomas Gill	1963–1965	Hawaii	Democratic	1922–2009
Courtland C. Gillen	1931–1933	Indiana	Democratic	1880–1954
Dean M. Gillespie	1944–1947	Colorado	Republican	1884–1949
Eugene P. Gillespie	1891–1893	Pennsylvania	Democratic	1852–1899
Frank Gillespie	1933–1935	Illinois	Democratic	1869–1954
James Gillespie	1793–1795	North Carolina	Anti-Administration	c. 1747–1805
James Gillespie	1795–1799; 1803–1805	North Carolina	Democratic-Republican	c. 1747–1805
Oscar W. Gillespie	1903–1911	Texas	Democratic	1858–1927
Charles W. Gillet	1893–1905	New York	Republican	1840–1908
Ransom H. Gillet	1833–1837	New York	Democratic	1800–1876
Frederick H. Gillett	1893–1925	Massachusetts	Republican	1851–1935
James Gillett	1903–1906	California	Republican	1860–1937
Edward H. Gillette	1879–1881	Iowa	Greenbacker	1840–1918
Guy Mark Gillette	1933–1936	Iowa	Democratic	1879–1973
Wilson D. Gillette	1941–1951	Pennsylvania	Republican	1880–1951
Kirsten Gillibrand	2007–2009	New York	Democratic	1966–present
George W. Gillie	1939–1949	Indiana	Republican	1880–1963
John J. Gilligan	1965–1967	Ohio	Democratic	1921–2013
James Lisle Gillis	1857–1859	Pennsylvania	Democratic	1792–1881
Paul Gillmor	1989–2007	Ohio	Republican	1939–2007
Alexander Gillon	1793–1794	South Carolina	Anti-Administration	1741–1794
Benjamin A. Gilman	1973–2003	New York	Republican	1922–2016
Charles J. Gilman	1857–1859	Maine	Republican	1824–1901
Nicholas Gilman	1789–1795	New Hampshire	Pro-Administration	1755–1814
Nicholas Gilman	1795–1797	New Hampshire	Federalist	1755–1814
Dixie Gilmer	1949–1951	Oklahoma	Democratic	1901–1954
George Rockingham Gilmer	1821–1823	Georgia	Democratic-Republican	1790–1859
George Rockingham Gilmer	1827–1829; 1833–1835	Georgia	Democratic	1790–1859
John Adams Gilmer	1857–1859	North Carolina	American	1805–1868
John Adams Gilmer	1859–1861	North Carolina	Oppositionist	1805–1868
Thomas Walker Gilmer	1841–1843	Virginia	Whig	1802–1844
Thomas Walker Gilmer	1843–1844	Virginia	Democratic	1802–1844
Alfred Gilmore	1849–1853	Pennsylvania	Democratic	1812–1890
Edward Gilmore	1913–1915	Massachusetts	Democratic	1867–1924
John Gilmore	1829–1833	Pennsylvania	Democratic	1780–1845
Samuel Louis Gilmore	1909–1910	Louisiana	Democratic	1859–1910
Don Gingery	1935–1939	Pennsylvania	Democratic	1884–1961
Phil Gingrey	2003–2015	Georgia	Republican	1942–present
Newt Gingrich	1979–1999	Georgia	Republican	1943–present
Ronald B. Ginn	1973–1983	Georgia	Democratic	1934–2005
Joseph Gist	1821–1825	South Carolina	Democratic-Republican	1775–1836
Joseph Gist	1825–1827	South Carolina	Democratic	1775–1836
Robert H. Gittins	1913–1915	New York	Democratic	1869–1957
John R. Glascock	1883–1885	California	Democratic	1845–1913
Thomas Glascock	1835–1839	Georgia	Democratic	1790–1841
Hugh Glasgow	1813–1817	Pennsylvania	Democratic-Republican	1769–1818
Carter Glass	1902–1918	Virginia	Democratic	1858–1946
Presley T. Glass	1885–1889	Tennessee	Democratic	1824–1902
Samuel F. Glatfelter	1923–1925	Pennsylvania	Democratic	1858–1927
Henry Glen	1793–1795	New York	Pro-Administration	1739–1814
Henry Glen	1795–1801	New York	Federalist	1739–1814
Milton W. Glenn	1957–1965	New Jersey	Republican	1903–1967
Thomas L. Glenn	1901–1903	Idaho	Populist	1847–1918
Dan Glickman	1977–1995	Kansas	Democratic	1944–present
John Gloninger	1813	Pennsylvania	Federalist	1758–1836
Adam J. Glossbrenner	1865–1869	Pennsylvania	Democratic	1810–1889
David Delano Glover	1929–1935	Arkansas	Democratic	1868–1952
John Milton Glover	1885–1889	Missouri	Democratic	1852–1929
John Montgomery Glover	1873–1879	Missouri	Democratic	1822–1891
James P. Glynn	1915–1923; 1925–1930	Connecticut	Republican	1867–1930
Martin H. Glynn	1899–1901	New York	Democratic	1871–1924
Calvin Goddard	1801–1805	Connecticut	Federalist	1768–1842
William Godshalk	1879–1883	Pennsylvania	Republican	1817–1891
Hannibal L. Godwin	1907–1921	North Carolina	Democratic	1873–1929
Herman P. Goebel	1903–1911	Ohio	Republican	1853–1930
J. Henry Goeke	1911–1915	Ohio	Democratic	1869–1930
Abe Goff	1947–1949	Idaho	Republican	1899–1984
Nathan Goff Jr.	1883–1889	West Virginia	Republican	1843–1920
William L. Goggin	1839–1843; 1844–1845; 1847–1849	Virginia	Whig	1807–1870
Louie Gohmert	2005–2023	Texas	Republican	1953–present
Thomas R. Gold	1809–1813; 1815–1817	New York	Federalist	1764–1827
James S. Golden	1949–1955	Kentucky	Republican	1891–1971
Benjamin M. Golder	1925–1933	Pennsylvania	Republican	1891–1946
Henry M. Goldfogle	1901–1915; 1919–1921	New York	Democratic	1856–1929
Charles Goldsborough	1805–1817	Maryland	Federalist	1765–1834
Thomas Alan Goldsborough	1921–1939	Maryland	Democratic	1877–1951
Barry Goldwater Jr.	1969–1983	California	Republican	1938–present
Julius Goldzier	1893–1895	Illinois	Democratic	1854–1925
Edward Isaac Golladay	1871–1873	Tennessee	Democratic	1830–1897
Jacob Golladay	1867–1870	Kentucky	Democratic	1819–1887
Tony Gonzales	2021–2026	Texas	Republican	1980–present
Anthony Gonzalez	2019–2023	Ohio	Republican	1984–present
Charlie Gonzalez	1999–2013	Texas	Democratic	1945–present
Henry B. Gonzalez	1961–1999	Texas	Democratic	1916–2000
Jenniffer González-Colón	2017–2025	Puerto Rico	New Progressive/Republican	1976–present
Daniel Linn Gooch	1901–1905	Kentucky	Democratic	1853–1913
Daniel W. Gooch	1858–1865; 1873–1875	Massachusetts	Republican	1820–1891
Bob Good	2021–2025	Virginia	Republican	1965–present
James William Good	1909–1921	Iowa	Republican	1866–1929
Louis B. Goodall	1917–1921	Maine	Republican	1851–1935
John Goode	1875–1881	Virginia	Democratic	1829–1909
Patrick Gaines Goode	1837–1843	Ohio	Whig	1798–1862
Samuel Goode	1799–1801	Virginia	Democratic-Republican	1756–1822
Virgil Goode	1997–2009	Virginia	Republican	1946–present
William Goode	1841–1843; 1853–1859	Virginia	Democratic	1798–1859
Charles Goodell	1959–1968	New York	Republican	1926–1987
John M. Goodenow	1829–1830	Ohio	Democratic	1782–1838
Robert Goodenow	1851–1853	Maine	Whig	1800–1874
Rufus K. Goodenow	1849–1851	Maine	Whig	1790–1863
Benjamin Goodhue	1789–1795	Massachusetts	Pro-Administration	1748–1814
Benjamin Goodhue	1795–1796	Massachusetts	Federalist	1748–1814
John R. Goodin	1875–1877	Kansas	Democratic	1836–1885
Bob Goodlatte	1993–2019	Virginia	Republican	1952–present
George Atlee Goodling	1961–1965; 1967–1975	Pennsylvania	Republican	1896–1982
Bill Goodling	1975–2001	Pennsylvania	Republican	1927–2017
Isaac Goodnight	1889–1895	Kentucky	Democratic	1849–1901
Chauncey Goodrich	1795–1801	Connecticut	Federalist	1759–1815
Elizur Goodrich	1799–1801	Connecticut	Federalist	1761–1849
John Z. Goodrich	1851–1855	Massachusetts	Whig	1804–1885
Milo Goodrich	1871–1873	New York	Republican	1814–1881
Angier Goodwin	1943–1955	Massachusetts	Republican	1881–1975
Forrest Goodwin	1913	Maine	Republican	1862–1913
Godfrey G. Goodwin	1925–1933	Minnesota	Republican	1873–1933
Henry C. Goodwin	1854–1855	New York	Whig	1824–1860
Henry C. Goodwin	1857–1859	New York	Republican	1824–1860
John Noble Goodwin	1861–1863; 1865–1867	Maine; Arizona	Republican	1824–1887
Philip A. Goodwin	1933–1937	New York	Republican	1882–1937
Robert K. Goodwin	1940–1941	Iowa	Republican	1905–1983
William S. Goodwin	1911–1921	Arkansas	Democratic	1866–1937
Albert T. Goodwyn	1896–1897	Alabama	Populist	1842–1931
Peterson Goodwyn	1803–1818	Virginia	Democratic-Republican	1745–1818
Charles Goodyear	1845–1847; 1865–1867	New York	Democratic	1804–1876
Wells Goodykoontz	1919–1923	West Virginia	Republican	1872–1944
Bart Gordon	1985–2011	Tennessee	Democratic	1949–present
George W. Gordon	1907–1911	Tennessee	Democratic	1836–1911
James Gordon	1791–1795	New York	Pro-Administration	1739–1810
Robert B. Gordon	1899–1903	Ohio	Democratic	1855–1923
Samuel Gordon	1841–1843; 1845–1847	New York	Democratic	1802–1873
Thomas S. Gordon	1943–1959	Illinois	Democratic	1893–1959
William Gordon	1797–1800	New Hampshire	Federalist	1763–1802
William Gordon	1913–1919	Ohio	Democratic	1862–1942
William F. Gordon	1830–1835	Virginia	Democratic	1787–1858
Albert Gore Sr.	1939–1944; 1945–1953	Tennessee	Democratic	1907–1998
Al Gore	1977–1985	Tennessee	Democratic	1948–present
Benjamin Gorham	1820–1823	Massachusetts	Democratic-Republican	1775–1855
Benjamin Gorham	1827–1831; 1833–1835	Massachusetts	National Republican	1775–1855
George E. Gorman	1913–1915	Illinois	Democratic	1873–1935
James S. Gorman	1891–1895	Michigan	Democratic	1850–1923
John J. Gorman	1921–1923; 1925–1927	Illinois	Republican	1883–1949
Willis A. Gorman	1849–1853	Indiana	Democratic	1816–1876
Chester C. Gorski	1949–1951	New York	Democratic	1906–1975
Martin Gorski	1943–1949	Illinois	Democratic	1886–1949
Edward W. Goss	1930–1935	Connecticut	Republican	1893–1972
James H. Goss	1868–1869	South Carolina	Republican	1820–1886
Porter Goss	1989–2004	Florida	Republican	1938–present
Ed Gossett	1939–1951	Texas	Democratic	1902–1990
Daniel Gott	1847–1851	New York	Whig	1794–1864
Herman D. Gould	1849–1851	New York	Whig	1799–1852
Norman J. Gould	1915–1923	New York	Republican	1877–1964
Samuel W. Gould	1911–1913	Maine	Democratic	1852–1935
Joseph A. Goulden	1903–1911; 1913–1915	New York	Democratic	1844–1915
Theodore Gourdin	1813–1815	South Carolina	Democratic-Republican	1764–1826
Andrew R. Govan	1822–1825	South Carolina	Democratic-Republican	1794–1841
Andrew R. Govan	1825–1827	South Carolina	Democratic	1794–1841
Samuel F. Gove	1868–1869	Georgia	Republican	1822–1900
Trey Gowdy	2011–2019	South Carolina	Republican	1964–present
Bernard F. Grabowski	1963–1967	Connecticut	Democratic	1923–2019
Bill Gradison	1975–1993	Ohio	Republican	1928–present
Benjamin F. Grady	1891–1895	North Carolina	Democratic	1831–1914
Joseph V. Graff	1895–1911	Illinois	Republican	1854–1921
George S. Graham	1913–1931	Pennsylvania	Republican	1850–1931
Gwen Graham	2015–2017	Florida	Democratic	1963–present
James Graham	1833–1836; 1836–1837	North Carolina	National Republican	1793–1851
James Graham	1837–1843; 1845–1847	North Carolina	Whig	1793–1851
James H. Graham	1859–1861	New York	Republican	1812–1881
James M. Graham	1909–1915	Illinois	Democratic	1852–1945
John H. Graham	1893–1895	New York	Democratic	1835–1895
Lindsey Graham	1995–2003	South Carolina	Republican	1955–2026
Louis E. Graham	1939–1955	Pennsylvania	Republican	1880–1965
William Graham	1837–1839	Indiana	Whig	1782–1858
William H. Graham	1898–1903; 1905–1911	Pennsylvania	Republican	1844–1923
William J. Graham	1917–1924	Illinois	Republican	1872–1937
Phil Gramm	1979–1983	Texas	Democratic	1942–present
Phil Gramm	1983–1985	Texas	Republican	1942–present
Rod Grams	1993–1995	Minnesota	Republican	1948–2013
Kathryn E. Granahan	1956–1963	Pennsylvania	Democratic	1894–1979
William T. Granahan	1945–1947; 1949–1956	Pennsylvania	Democratic	1895–1956
Peter C. Granata	1931–1932	Illinois	Republican	1898–1973
Fred Grandy	1987–1995	Iowa	Republican	1948–present
William J. Granfield	1930–1937	Massachusetts	Democratic	1889–1959
Amos P. Granger	1855–1857	New York	Oppositionist	1789–1866
Amos P. Granger	1857–1859	New York	Republican	1789–1866
Bradley F. Granger	1861–1863	Michigan	Republican	1825–1882
Daniel L. D. Granger	1903–1909	Rhode Island	Democratic	1852–1909
Francis Granger	1835–1837	New York	National Republican	1792–1868
Francis Granger	1839–1841; 1841–1843	New York	Whig	1792–1868
Kay Granger	1997–2025	Texas	Republican	1943–2026
Miles T. Granger	1887–1889	Connecticut	Democratic	1817–1895
Walter K. Granger	1941–1953	Utah	Democratic	1888–1978
Abraham P. Grant	1837–1839	New York	Democratic	1804–1871
George M. Grant	1938–1965	Alabama	Democratic	1897–1982
Bill Grant	1987–1989; 1989–1991	Florida	Democratic; Republican	1943–present
John G. Grant	1909–1911	North Carolina	Republican	1858–1923
Robert A. Grant	1939–1949	Indiana	Republican	1905–1998
Seaton Grantland	1835–1839	Georgia	Democratic	1782–1864
Chuck Grassley	1975–1981	Iowa	Republican	1933–present
Ella T. Grasso	1971–1975	Connecticut	Democratic	1919–1981
Joseph J. Gravely	1867–1871	Missouri	Republican	1828–1872
Alexander Graves	1883–1885	Missouri	Democratic	1844–1916
Garret Graves	2015–2025	Louisiana	Republican	1972–present
Tom Graves	2010–2020	Georgia	Republican	1970–present
William J. Graves	1835–1837	Kentucky	National Republican	1805–1848
William J. Graves	1837–1841	Kentucky	Whig	1805–1848
Edward W. Gray	1915–1919	New Jersey	Republican	1870–1942
Edwin Gray	1799–1813	Virginia	Democratic-Republican	1743–18??
Finly H. Gray	1911–1917; 1933–1939	Indiana	Democratic	1863–1947
Hiram Gray	1837–1839	New York	Democratic	1801–1890
John C. Gray	1820–1821	Virginia	Democratic-Republican	1783–1823
Joseph A. Gray	1935–1939	Pennsylvania	Democratic	1884–1966
Kenneth J. Gray	1955–1974; 1985–1989	Illinois	Democratic	1924–2014
Oscar L. Gray	1915–1919	Alabama	Democratic	1865–1936
William H. Gray III	1979–1991	Pennsylvania	Democratic	1941–2013
Alan Grayson	2009–2011; 2013–2017	Florida	Democratic	1958–present
William J. Grayson	1833–1837	South Carolina	Nullifier	1788–1863
Horace Greeley	1848–1849	New York	Whig	1811–1872
Byram Green	1843–1845	New York	Democratic	1786–1865
Edith Green	1955–1974	Oregon	Democratic	1910–1987
Frederick W. Green	1851–1855	Ohio	Democratic	1816–1879
Gene Green	1993–2019	Texas	Democratic	1947–present
Henry D. Green	1899–1903	Pennsylvania	Democratic	1857–1929
Innis Green	1827–1831	Pennsylvania	Democratic	1776–1839
Isaiah L. Green	1805–1809; 1811–1813	Massachusetts	Democratic-Republican	1761–1841
James S. Green	1847–1851	Missouri	Democratic	1817–1870
Mark Green	1999–2007	Wisconsin	Republican	1960–present
Mark Green	2019–2025	Tennessee	Republican	1964–present
Robert A. Green	1925–1944	Florida	Democratic	1892–1973
Robert S. Green	1885–1887	New Jersey	Democratic	1831–1895
S. William Green	1978–1993	New York	Republican	1929–2002
Thomas M. Green Jr.	1802–1803	Mississippi	Democratic-Republican	1758–1813
Wharton J. Green	1883–1887	North Carolina	Democratic	1831–1910
William J. Green Jr.	1945–1947; 1949–1963	Pennsylvania	Democratic	1910–1963
William J. Green III	1964–1977	Pennsylvania	Democratic	1938–present
William R. Green	1911–1928	Iowa	Republican	1856–1947
Willis Green	1839–1845	Kentucky	Whig	1794–1862
Enid Greene Mickelsen	1995–1997	Utah	Republican	1958–present
Frank L. Greene	1912–1923	Vermont	Republican	1870–1930
George Woodward Greene	1869–1870	New York	Democratic	1831–1895
Marjorie Taylor Greene	2021–2026	Georgia	Republican	1974–present
William Laury Greene	1897–1899	Nebraska	Populist	1849–1899
William S. Greene	1898–1924	Massachusetts	Republican	1841–1924
Frederic T. Greenhalge	1889–1891	Massachusetts	Republican	1842–1896
Halbert S. Greenleaf	1883–1885; 1891–1893	New York	Democratic	1827–1906
Edward W. Greenman	1887–1889	New York	Democratic	1840–1908
Christopher Greenup	1792–1795	Kentucky	Anti-Administration	1750–1818
Christopher Greenup	1795–1797	Kentucky	Democratic-Republican	1750–1818
Isabella Greenway	1933–1937	Arizona	Democratic	1886–1953
Alfred B. Greenwood	1853–1859	Arkansas	Democratic	1811–1889
Arthur H. Greenwood	1923–1939	Indiana	Democratic	1880–1963
Ernest Greenwood	1951–1953	New York	Democratic	1884–1955
Jim Greenwood	1993–2005	Pennsylvania	Republican	1951–present
Paul Ranous Greever	1935–1939	Wyoming	Democratic	1891–1943
Alexander W. Gregg	1903–1919	Texas	Democratic	1855–1919
Andrew Gregg	1791–1795	Pennsylvania	Anti-Administration	1755–1835
Andrew Gregg	1795–1807	Pennsylvania	Democratic-Republican	1755–1835
Curtis H. Gregg	1911–1913	Pennsylvania	Democratic	1865–1933
James M. Gregg	1857–1859	Indiana	Democratic	1806–1869
Judd Gregg	1981–1989	New Hampshire	Republican	1947–present
Dudley S. Gregory	1847–1849	New Jersey	Whig	1800–1874
Noble Jones Gregory	1937–1959	Kentucky	Democratic	1897–1971
W. Voris Gregory	1927–1936	Kentucky	Democratic	1877–1936
John Greig	1841	New York	Whig	1779–1858
Stanley L. Greigg	1965–1967	Iowa	Democratic	1931–2002
George Grennell Jr.	1829–1837	Massachusetts	National Republican	1786–1877
George Grennell Jr.	1837–1839	Massachusetts	Whig	1786–1877
Walter Gresham	1893–1895	Texas	Democratic	1841–1920
Benjamin E. Grey	1851–1855	Kentucky	Whig	1809–1875
George W. Grider	1965–1967	Tennessee	Democratic	1912–1991
Henry Grider	1843–1847	Kentucky	Whig	1796–1866
Henry Grider	1861–1865	Kentucky	Unionist	1796–1866
Henry Grider	1865–1866	Kentucky	Democratic	1796–1866
William W. Griest	1909–1929	Pennsylvania	Republican	1858–1929
Anthony J. Griffin	1918–1935	New York	Democratic	1866–1935
Charles H. Griffin	1968–1973	Mississippi	Democratic	1926–1989
Daniel J. Griffin	1913–1917	New York	Democratic	1880–1926
Isaac Griffin	1813–1817	Pennsylvania	Democratic-Republican	1756–1827
John K. Griffin	1831–1839	South Carolina	Nullifier	1789–1841
John K. Griffin	1839–1841	South Carolina	Democratic	1789–1841
Levi T. Griffin	1893–1895	Michigan	Democratic	1837–1906
Michael Griffin	1894–1899	Wisconsin	Republican	1842–1899
Robert P. Griffin	1957–1966	Michigan	Republican	1923–2015
Samuel Griffin	1789–1791	Virginia	Pro-Administration	1746–1810
Samuel Griffin	1791–1793	Virginia	Anti-Administration	1746–1810
Samuel Griffin	1793–1795	Virginia	Pro-Administration	1746–1810
Thomas Griffin	1803–1805	Virginia	Federalist	1773–1837
Tim Griffin	2011–2015	Arkansas	Republican	1968–present
Francis M. Griffith	1897–1905	Indiana	Democratic	1849–1927
John K. Griffith	1937–1941	Louisiana	Democratic	1882–1942
Parker Griffith	2009–2011	Alabama	Republican	1942–present
Samuel Griffith	1871–1873	Pennsylvania	Democratic	1816–1893
Martha Griffiths	1955–1974	Michigan	Democratic	1912–2003
Percy W. Griffiths	1943–1949	Ohio	Republican	1893–1983
James M. Griggs	1897–1910	Georgia	Democratic	1861–1910
George B. Grigsby	1920–1921	Alaska	Democratic	1874–1962
Raúl Grijalva	2003–2025	Arizona	Democratic	1948–2025
Thomas W. Grimes	1887–1891	Georgia	Democratic	1844–1905
Michael Grimm	2011–2015	New York	Republican	1970–present
Joseph Grinnell	1843–1851	Massachusetts	Whig	1788–1885
Josiah B. Grinnell	1863–1867	Iowa	Republican	1821–1891
Moses H. Grinnell	1839–1841	New York	Whig	1803–1877
Wayne R. Grisham	1979–1983	California	Republican	1923–2011
Gaylord Griswold	1803–1805	New York	Federalist	1767–1809
Glenn Griswold	1931–1939	Indiana	Democratic	1890–1940
Harry W. Griswold	1939	Wisconsin	Republican	1886–1939
John Ashley Griswold	1869–1871	New York	Democratic	1822–1902
John Augustus Griswold	1863–1865	New York	Democratic	1818–1872
John Augustus Griswold	1865–1869	New York	Republican	1818–1872
Matthew Griswold	1891–1893; 1895–1897	Pennsylvania	Republican	1833–1919
Roger Griswold	1795–1805	Connecticut	Federalist	1762–1812
William S. Groesbeck	1857–1859	Ohio	Democratic	1815–1897
Asle Gronna	1905–1911	North Dakota	Republican	1858–1922
Chester H. Gross	1939–1941; 1943–1949	Pennsylvania	Republican	1888–1973
Ezra C. Gross	1819–1821	New York	Democratic-Republican	1787–1829
Harold R. Gross	1949–1975	Iowa	Republican	1899–1987
Samuel Gross	1819–1823	Pennsylvania	Democratic-Republican	1776–1839
Charles H. Grosvenor	1885–1891; 1893–1907	Ohio	Republican	1833–1917
Thomas P. Grosvenor	1813–1817	New York	Federalist	1778–1817
John E. Grotberg	1985–1986	Illinois	Republican	1925–1986
Jonathan Grout	1789–1791	Massachusetts	Anti-Administration	1737–1807
William W. Grout	1881–1883; 1885–1901	Vermont	Republican	1836–1902
William Barry Grove	1791–1795	North Carolina	Pro-Administration	1764–1818
William Barry Grove	1795–1803	North Carolina	Federalist	1764–1818
Asa Grover	1867–1869	Kentucky	Democratic	1819–1887
James R. Grover Jr.	1963–1975	New York	Republican	1919–2012
La Fayette Grover	1859	Oregon	Democratic	1823–1911
Martin Grover	1845–1847	New York	Democratic	1811–1875
Galusha A. Grow	1851–1857	Pennsylvania	Democratic	1823–1907
Galusha A. Grow	1857–1863; 1894–1903	Pennsylvania	Republican	1823–1907
Felix Grucci	2001–2003	New York	Republican	1951–present
Felix Grundy	1811–1814	Tennessee	Democratic-Republican	1777–1840
Frank J. Guarini	1979–1993	New Jersey	Democratic	1924–2026
Charles Gubser	1953–1974	California	Republican	1916–2011
Gilbert Gude	1967–1977	Maryland	Republican	1923–2007
James M. Gudger Jr.	1903–1907; 1911–1915	North Carolina	Democratic	1855–1920
V. Lamar Gudger	1977–1981	North Carolina	Democratic	1919–2004
Richard W. Guenther	1881–1889	Wisconsin	Republican	1845–1913
Frank E. Guernsey	1908–1917	Maine	Republican	1866–1927
Pedro Guevara	1923–1936	Philippines	None	1879–1938
Ben H. Guill	1950–1951	Texas	Republican	1909–1994
Frank Guinta	2011–2013; 2015–2017	New Hampshire	Republican	1970–present
Lewis B. Gunckel	1873–1875	Ohio	Republican	1826–1903
Steve Gunderson	1981–1997	Wisconsin	Republican	1951–present
James Gunn	1897–1899	Idaho	Populist	1843–1911
Bill Gunter	1973–1975	Florida	Democratic	1934–2024
Thomas M. Gunter	1874–1883	Arkansas	Democratic	1826–1904
Henry Hosford Gurley	1823–1825	Louisiana	Democratic-Republican	1788–1833
Henry Hosford Gurley	1825–1831	Louisiana	National Republican	1788–1833
John A. Gurley	1859–1863	Ohio	Republican	1813–1863
Edward J. Gurney	1963–1969	Florida	Republican	1914–1996
Amos Gustine	1841–1843	Pennsylvania	Democratic	1789–1844
Luis Gutiérrez	1993–2019	Illinois	Democratic	1953–present
Gil Gutknecht	1995–2007	Minnesota	Republican	1951–present
Tennyson Guyer	1973–1981	Ohio	Republican	1912–1981
U. S. Guyer	1924–1925; 1927–1943	Kansas	Republican	1868–1943
James Guyon Jr.	1820–1821	New York	Democratic-Republican	1778–1846
William M. Gwin	1841–1843	Mississippi	Democratic	1805–1885
Ralph W. Gwinn	1945–1959	New York	Republican	1884–1962
John W. Gwynne	1935–1949	Iowa	Republican	1889–1972
