= Iris Faircloth Blitch =

American politician (1912–1993)

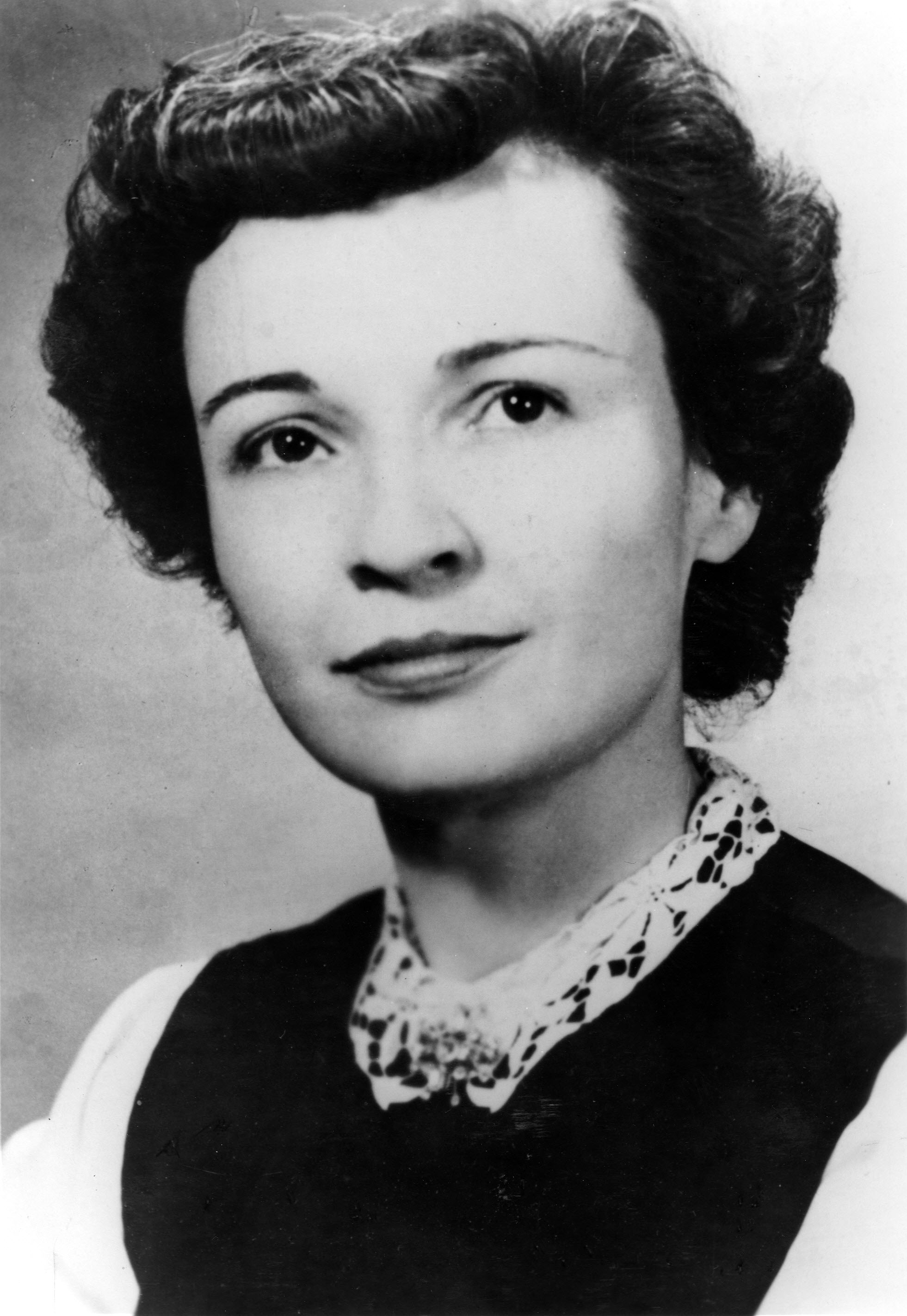

Member of the U.S. House of Representatives from Georgia's 8th district
- In office January 3, 1955 – January 3, 1963
- Preceded by: William McDonald Wheeler
- Succeeded by: James Russell Tuten

Member of the Georgia Senate
- In office 1947-1949; 1953-1954

Member of the Georgia House of Representatives
- In office 1947-1949

Personal details
- Born: April 25, 1912 Toombs County, Georgia, US
- Died: August 19, 1993 (aged 81) San Diego, California, US
- Party: Democratic (before 1964); Republican (1964)

Iris Faircloth Blitch (April 25, 1912 – August 19, 1993) was a United States representative from Georgia. She was the fourth woman to represent Georgia in the Congress, and the first to win a regularly scheduled general election. (Note: Rebecca Latimer Felton was appointed in 1922 and became the first woman to ever serve in the United States Senate. Florence Reville Gibbs won a 1940 special election to succeed her deceased husband in the House of Representatives. Helen Douglas Mankin won a special election to a House seat in 1946.) Blitch was a vocal advocate both for women's rights and racial segregation.

== Early life ==
Blitch was born near Vidalia, Georgia and attended the University of Georgia (UGA) in Athens in 1929. She also attended South Georgia College in Douglas in 1949. Blitch worked with her husband in managing their farm as well as cattle, timber, naval stores, fertilizer, and pharmacy businesses in Homerville, Georgia.

== Political career ==
=== State legislature ===
In 1946, Blitch was elected to the Georgia Senate; she was subsequently elected to the Georgia House of Representatives in 1948 but lost her reelection bid to that office in 1950. She won election to the state Senate again in 1952 and remained in that position through December 31, 1954. From 1948 through 1954, Blitch was Georgia's Democratic Party national committee member.

=== Tenure in Congress ===
Running a successful campaign for Georgia's 8th congressional district in the United States House of Representatives as a Democrat, Blitch served in the 84th United States Congress.

A staunch segregationist, in 1956, Blitch was among the 101 Southern politicians to sign the Southern Manifesto. She won re-election to three additional terms in that seat before choosing not to seek reelection in 1962 due to severe arthritis. In 1964, Blitch left the Democratic Party and endorsed Republican presidential nominee Barry Goldwater. She switched back to the Democratic Party to campaign for Jimmy Carter during his gubernatorial election.

Five days after her 1954 election, Blitch appeared on the American television show What's My Line.

== Later life ==
After her political service, Blitch resided on St. Simons Island, Georgia, until 1988, when she moved to San Diego, California, to be closer to her daughter. She died there on August 19, 1993, and was buried in Pine Forest Cemetery in Homerville, Georgia.

== See also ==
- Women in the United States House of Representatives

== Note ==
U.S. House of Representatives
Preceded by William M. Wheeler	Member of the U.S. House of Representatives from Georgia's 8th congressional district January 3, 1955 – January 3, 1963	Succeeded by J. Russell Tuten
