= Braswell Deen =

American politician (1893–1981)

Member of the U.S. House of Representatives from Georgia's 8th district
- In office March 4, 1933 – January 3, 1939
- Preceded by: Charles H. Brand
- Succeeded by: W. Benjamin Gibbs

Personal details
- Born: June 28, 1893 near Baxley, Georgia, U.S.
- Died: November 28, 1981 (aged 88) Alma, Georgia, U.S.
- Party: Democratic
- Children: 5, including Braswell Jr.
- Education: Emory University

Braswell Drue Deen (June 28, 1893 – November 28, 1981) was a U.S. representative from Georgia.

== Life ==
Born on a farm near Baxley, Georgia, Deen attended public and high schools and South Georgia College, McRae, Georgia.

Deen was elected county school superintendent, Appling County, Georgia, November 1916-August 1918. He was graduated from Emory University, Atlanta, Georgia, in 1922. He served as superintendent of schools at Tennille, Georgia from 1922 to 1924. He served as president of South Georgia Junior College, McRae, Georgia from 1924 to 1927. He engaged in farming and real estate development in 1927 and 1928. He was editor and proprietor of the Alma (Georgia) Times. He also engaged in banking.

Deen was elected as a Democrat to the Seventy-third, Seventy-fourth, and Seventy-fifth Congresses (March 4, 1933 – January 3, 1939). He was not a candidate for renomination in 1938 to the Seventy-sixth Congress. After serving in Congress, he worked as an insurance broker and cattle farmer. He resided in Alma, Georgia, until his death there on November 28, 1981. He was interred at Rose Hill Cemetery in Alma, Georgia.

U.S. House of Representatives
Preceded by Charles H. Brand	Member of the U.S. House of Representatives from Georgia's 8th congressional district March 4, 1933 – January 3, 1939	Succeeded by W. Benjamin Gibbs
