= Georgia's 8th congressional district =

U.S. House district for Georgia

Coordinates: 31°46′47″N 83°27′05″W

- Interactive map of district boundaries since January 3, 2023
- Representative: Austin Scott; R–Tifton
- Distribution: 56.7% urban; 43.3% rural
- Population (2025): 780,493
- Median household income: $67,214
- Ethnicity: 57.9% White; 29.7% Black; 7.2% Hispanic; 3.1% Two or more races; 1.6% Asian; 0.5% other
- Cook PVI: R+15

Georgia's 8th congressional district is a congressional district in the U.S. state of Georgia. The district is currently represented by Republican Austin Scott.

The district is located in central and south-central Georgia, and stretches from the geographical center of the state to the Florida border. The district includes the cities of Perry, Cordele, Tifton, Moultrie, Valdosta, and portions of Macon.

== Recent election results from statewide races ==
Year	Office	Results
2008	President	McCain 62% - 37%
2012	President	Romney 63% - 37%
2016	President	Trump 64% - 34%
2016	Senate	Isakson 67% - 30%
2018	Governor	Kemp 65% - 34%
2018	Lt. Governor	Duncan 66% - 34%
2018	Attorney General	Carr 66% - 34%
2020	President	Trump 63% - 36%
2021	Senate (Reg.)	Perdue 64% - 36%
2021	Senate (Spec.)	Loeffler 63% - 37%
2022	Senate	Walker 64% - 36%
2022	Governor	Kemp 68% - 32%
2022	Lt. Governor	Jones 67% - 32%
2022	Secretary of State	Raffensperger 67% - 30%
2022	Attorney General	Carr 67% - 32%
2024	President	Trump 65% - 34%

== Counties and communities ==
For the 119th and successive Congresses (based on the districts drawn following a 2023 court order), the district contains all or portions of the following counties and communities.

Atkinson County (3)

All three communities

Baldwin County (2)

Hardwick, Milledgeville

Ben Hill County (1)

Fitzgerald

Berrien County (4)

All four communities

Bibb County (1)

Macon (part; also 2nd)

Bleckley County (3)

All three communities

Brooks County (5)

All five communities

Clinch County (5)

All five communities

Coffee County (4)

All four communities

Colquitt County (6)

All six communities

Cook County (4)

All four communities

Crisp County (3)

All three communities

Dodge County (6)

All six communities

Echols County (1)

Statenville

Houston County (2)

Perry (part; also 2nd; shared with Peach County), Warner Robbins (part; also 2nd)

Irwin County (1)

Ocilla

Lanier County (3)

All three communities

Lowndes County (9)

All nine communities

Jeff Davis County (3)

All three communities

Jones County (1)

Gray

Monroe County (5)

All five communities

Pulaski County (1)

Hawkinsville

Telfair County (4)

All four communities

Tift County (5)

All five communities

Turner County (3)

All three communities

Twiggs County (3)

All three communities

Wilcox County (5)

All five communities

Wilkinson County (7)

All seven communities

Worth County (4)

All four communities

== List of members representing the district ==
Member	Party	Years	Cong ress	Electoral history	District location
District created March 4, 1845
Robert Toombs (Washington)	Whig	March 4, 1845 – March 4, 1853	29th 30th 31st 32nd	Elected in 1844. Re-elected in 1846. Re-elected in 1848. Re-elected in 1851. [data missing]	[data missing]
Alexander Stephens (Crawfordville)	Whig	March 4, 1853 – March 4, 1855	33rd 34th 35th	Redistricted from the 7th district and re-elected in 1853. Re-elected in 1855. Re-elected in 1857. [data missing]	[data missing]
Alexander Stephens (Crawfordville)	Democratic	March 4, 1855 – March 4, 1859	33rd 34th 35th	Redistricted from the 7th district and re-elected in 1853. Re-elected in 1855. Re-elected in 1857. [data missing]	[data missing]
John J. Jones (Waynesboro)	Democratic	March 4, 1859 – January 23, 1861	36th	Elected in 1859. Withdrew.	[data missing]
Vacant		January 23, 1861 – March 4, 1867	36th 37th 38th 39th	Civil War and Reconstruction	
District eliminated March 4, 1867
District reestablished March 4, 1873
Vacant		March 4, 1873 – December 1, 1873	43rd	Member-elect Ambrose R. Wright died before being seated.	[data missing]
Alexander Stephens (Crawfordville)	Democratic	December 1, 1873 – November 4, 1882	43rd 44th 45th 46th 47th	Elected to finish Wright's term. Re-elected in 1874. Re-elected in 1876. Re-elected in 1878. Re-elected in 1880. Resigned to become Governor of Georgia.	[data missing]
Vacant		November 4, 1882 – December 4, 1882	47th		[data missing]
Seaborn Reese (Sparta)	Democratic	December 4, 1882 – March 4, 1887	47th 48th 49th	Elected to finish Stephens's term. Re-elected in 1882. Re-elected in 1884. [data missing]	[data missing]
Henry H. Carlton (Athens)	Democratic	March 4, 1887 – March 4, 1891	50th 51st	Elected in 1886. Re-elected in 1888. [data missing]	[data missing]
Thomas G. Lawson (Eatonton)	Democratic	March 4, 1891 – March 4, 1897	52nd 53rd 54th	Elected in 1890. Re-elected in 1892. Re-elected in 1894. [data missing]	[data missing]
William M. Howard (Lexington)	Democratic	March 4, 1897 – March 4, 1911	55th 56th 57th 58th 59th 60th 61st	Elected in 1896. Re-elected in 1898. Re-elected in 1900. Re-elected in 1902. Re-elected in 1904. Re-elected in 1906. Re-elected in 1908. Lost renomination.	[data missing]
Samuel J. Tribble (Athens)	Democratic	March 4, 1911 – December 8, 1916	62nd 63rd 64th	Elected in 1910. Re-elected in 1912. Re-elected in 1914. Re-elected in 1916. Died.	[data missing]
Vacant		December 8, 1916 – January 11, 1917	64th		[data missing]
Tinsley W. Rucker Jr. (Athens)	Democratic	January 11, 1917 – March 4, 1917	64th	Elected to finish Tribble's term. Retired.	[data missing]
Charles H. Brand (Athens)	Democratic	March 4, 1917 – March 4, 1933	65th 66th 67th 68th 69th 70th 71st 72nd	Elected in 1916. Re-elected in 1918. Re-elected in 1920. Re-elected in 1922. Re-elected in 1924. Re-elected in 1926. Re-elected in 1928. Re-elected in 1930. [data missing]	[data missing]
Braswell Deen (Alma)	Democratic	March 4, 1933 – January 3, 1939	73rd 74th 75th	Elected in 1932. Re-elected in 1934. Re-elected in 1936. [data missing]	[data missing]
W. Benjamin Gibbs (Jesup)	Democratic	January 3, 1939 – August 7, 1940	76th	Elected in 1938. Died.	[data missing]
Vacant		August 7, 1940 – October 1, 1940	76th		[data missing]
Florence R. Gibbs (Athens)	Democratic	October 1, 1940 – January 3, 1941	76th	Elected to finish her husband's term. [data missing]	[data missing]
John S. Gibson (Douglas)	Democratic	January 3, 1941 – January 3, 1947	77th 78th 79th	Elected in 1940. Re-elected in 1942. Re-elected in 1944. [data missing]	[data missing]
William M. Wheeler (Alma)	Democratic	January 3, 1947 – January 3, 1955	80th 81st 82nd 83rd	Elected in 1946. Re-elected in 1948. Re-elected in 1950. Re-elected in 1952. [data missing]	[data missing]
Iris F. Blitch (Homerville)	Democratic	January 3, 1955 – January 3, 1963	84th 85th 86th 87th	Elected in 1954. Re-elected in 1956. Re-elected in 1958. Re-elected in 1960. [data missing]	[data missing]
J. Russell Tuten (Brunswick)	Democratic	January 3, 1963 – January 3, 1967	88th 89th	Elected in 1962. Re-elected in 1964. [data missing]	[data missing]
W. S. Stuckey Jr. (Eastman)	Democratic	January 3, 1967 – January 3, 1977	90th 91st 92nd 93rd 94th	Elected in 1966. Re-elected in 1968. Re-elected in 1970. Re-elected in 1972. Re-elected in 1974. [data missing]	[data missing]
Billy Lee Evans (Macon)	Democratic	January 3, 1977 – January 3, 1983	95th 96th 97th	Elected in 1976. Re-elected in 1978. Re-elected in 1980. [data missing]	[data missing]
J. Roy Rowland (Dublin)	Democratic	January 3, 1983 – January 3, 1995	98th 99th 100th 101st 102nd 103rd	Elected in 1982. Re-elected in 1984. Re-elected in 1986. Re-elected in 1988. Re-elected in 1990. Re-elected in 1992. [data missing]	[data missing]
Saxby Chambliss (Moultrie)	Republican	January 3, 1995 – January 3, 2003	104th 105th 106th 107th	Elected in 1994. Re-elected in 1996. Re-elected in 1998. Re-elected in 2000. Retired to run for U.S. senator.	[data missing]
Mac Collins (Hampton)	Republican	January 3, 2003 – January 3, 2005	108th	Redistricted from the 3rd district and re-elected in 2002. Retired to run for U.S. senator.	2003–2007
Lynn Westmoreland (Grantville)	Republican	January 3, 2005 – January 3, 2007	109th	Elected in 2004. Redistricted to the 3rd district.	2003–2007
Jim Marshall (Macon)	Democratic	January 3, 2007 – January 3, 2011	110th 111th	Redistricted from the 3rd district and re-elected in 2006. Re-elected in 2008. Lost re-election.	2007–2013
Austin Scott (Tifton)	Republican	January 3, 2011 – present	112th 113th 114th 115th 116th 117th 118th 119th	Elected in 2010. Re-elected in 2012. Re-elected in 2014. Re-elected in 2016. Re-elected in 2018. Re-elected in 2020. Re-elected in 2022. Re-elected in 2024. Re-elected in 2026.	2007–2013
Austin Scott (Tifton)	Republican	January 3, 2011 – present	112th 113th 114th 115th 116th 117th 118th 119th	Elected in 2010. Re-elected in 2012. Re-elected in 2014. Re-elected in 2016. Re-elected in 2018. Re-elected in 2020. Re-elected in 2022. Re-elected in 2024. Re-elected in 2026.	2013–2023
Austin Scott (Tifton)	Republican	January 3, 2011 – present	112th 113th 114th 115th 116th 117th 118th 119th	Elected in 2010. Re-elected in 2012. Re-elected in 2014. Re-elected in 2016. Re-elected in 2018. Re-elected in 2020. Re-elected in 2022. Re-elected in 2024. Re-elected in 2026.	2023–2025
Austin Scott (Tifton)	Republican	January 3, 2011 – present	112th 113th 114th 115th 116th 117th 118th 119th	Elected in 2010. Re-elected in 2012. Re-elected in 2014. Re-elected in 2016. Re-elected in 2018. Re-elected in 2020. Re-elected in 2022. Re-elected in 2024. Re-elected in 2026.	2025–present

== Election results ==
=== 2002 ===
Georgia's 8th congressional district election, 2002
Party	Candidate	Votes	%
Republican	Mac Collins (inc.)	142,505	78.33
Democratic	Angelos Petrakopoulos	39,422	21.67
Total votes		181,927	100.00
Republican hold			

=== 2004 ===
Georgia's 8th congressional district election, 2004
Party	Candidate	Votes	%
Republican	Lynn Westmoreland	227,524	75.55
Democratic	Silvia Delamar	73,632	24.45
Total votes		301,156	100.00
Republican hold			

=== 2006 ===
Georgia's 8th Congressional District Election (2006)
Party	Candidate	Votes	%
Democratic	Jim Marshall (Incumbent)	80,660	50.55%
Republican	Mac Collins	78,908	49.45%
Total votes		159,568	100.00%
Democratic gain from Republican			

- A Republican mid-decade redistricting made this Macon-based district more compact and somewhat more Republican. Incumbent Marshall faced a very tough challenge by former U.S. Representative Mac Collins, who represented an adjoining district from 1993 to 2005. Less than 60 percent of the population in Marshall's present 3rd District was retained in the new 8th District. The reconfigured 8th includes Butts County, which was the political base of Collins, who once served as chair of the county commission. On the other hand, the 8th also includes all of the city of Macon where Marshall served as mayor from 1995 until 1999. The race featured heavy spending, not only by the candidates themselves but also from independent groups. During the campaign, President George W. Bush attended a rally on Collins' behalf.

=== 2008 ===
Georgia's 8th Congressional District Election (2008)
Party	Candidate	Votes	%
Democratic	Jim Marshall (Incumbent)	157,241	57.24%
Republican	Rick Goddard	117,446	42.76%
Total votes		274,687	100.00%
Democratic hold			

=== 2010 ===
Georgia's 8th Congressional District Election (2010)
Party	Candidate	Votes	%
Republican	Austin Scott	102,770	52.70%
Democratic	Jim Marshall (Incumbent)	92,250	47.30%
Total votes		195,020	100.00%
Republican gain from Democratic			

=== 2012 ===
Georgia's 8th Congressional District Election (2012)
Party	Candidate	Votes	%
Republican	Austin Scott (Incumbent)	197,789	100.00%
Total votes		197,789	100.00%
Republican hold			

=== 2014 ===
Georgia's 8th Congressional District Election (2014)
Party	Candidate	Votes	%
Republican	Austin Scott (Incumbent)	129,938	100.00%
Total votes		129,938	100.00%
Republican hold			

=== 2016 ===
Georgia's 8th Congressional District Election (2016)
Party	Candidate	Votes	%
Republican	Austin Scott (Incumbent)	173,983	67.64%
Democratic	James Harris	83,225	32.36%
Total votes		257,208	100.00%
Republican hold			

=== 2018 ===
Georgia's 8th Congressional District Election (2018)
Party	Candidate	Votes	%
Republican	Austin Scott (Incumbent)	197,401	100.00%
Total votes		197,401	100.00%
Republican hold			

=== 2020 ===
Georgia's 8th Congressional District Election (2020)
Party	Candidate	Votes	%
Republican	Austin Scott (Incumbent)	198,701	64.05%
Democratic	Lindsay "Doc" Holliday	109,264	35.05%
Total votes		307,965	100.00%
Republican hold			

=== 2022 ===
Georgia's 8th Congressional District Election (2022)
Party	Candidate	Votes	%
Republican	Austin Scott (incumbent)	178,700	68.58%
Democratic	Darrius Butler	81,886	31.42%
Total votes		260,586	100.00%
Republican hold			

=== 2024 ===
Georgia's 8th Congressional District Election (2024)
Party	Candidate	Votes	%
Republican	Austin Scott (incumbent)	231,547	68.92%
Democratic	Darrius Butler	104,434	31.08%
Total votes		335,981	100.00%
Republican hold			

== See also ==
- Georgia's congressional districts
- List of United States congressional districts
