= Don Wheeler (politician) =

American politician

William McDonald Wheeler
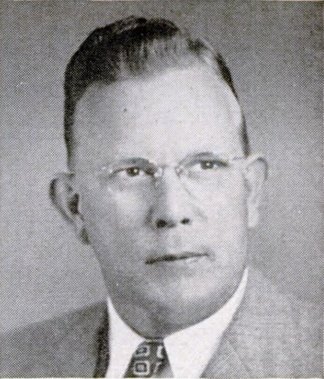

Member of the U.S. House of Representatives from Georgia's 8th district
- In office January 3, 1947 – January 3, 1955
- Preceded by: John S. Gibson
- Succeeded by: Iris F. Blitch

Personal details
- Born: July 11, 1915 Alma, Georgia, U.S.
- Died: May 5, 1989 (aged 73) Alma, Georgia, U.S.
- Party: Democratic

William McDonald (Don) Wheeler (July 11, 1915 – May 5, 1989) was a U.S. representative from Georgia.

== Life and career ==
Born near Alma, Georgia, Wheeler attended South Georgia College at Douglas, Georgia; Middle Georgia College at Cochran, Georgia; Georgia Teachers College at Statesboro, Georgia; and Atlanta Law School, where he received a Bachelor of Laws in 1966. He was a farmer and a teacher. He was in the United States Army Air Forces from 1942 to 1946, entering as a private and working his way through the ranks to captain.

Wheeler was elected as a Democrat to represent Georgia's 8th congressional district in the United States House of Representatives, serving in the Eightieth through Eighty-Third Congresses (January 3, 1947 – January 3, 1955). He served as delegate to the 1952 Democratic National Convention.

Wheeler notably introduced a resolution to impeach US Supreme Court Associate Justice William O. Douglas on June 17, 1953, in opposition to Douglas' stay of execution in the case of Julius and Ethel Rosenberg. The resolution was referred the next day to the Judiciary Committee to investigate the charges. On July 7, 1953, the committee voted to end the investigation.

Wheeler lost renomination as the Democratic Party candidate in 1954, after which he continued his career in public administration, beginning in the Georgia Motor Vehicle Division of the Internal Revenue Department from 1955 to 1956. He served as a tax examiner for the State of Georgia; federal programs coordinator for the Bacon County Board of Education; and assistant director of the Governor's Highway Safety Program for the State of Mississippi. He also worked in sales and public relations.

Wheeler died on May 5, 1989, in Alma, Georgia.

U.S. House of Representatives
Preceded by John S. Gibson	Member of the U.S. House of Representatives from Georgia's 8th congressional district January 3, 1947 – January 3, 1955	Succeeded by Iris F. Blitch
