= J. Burrwood Daly =

American politician

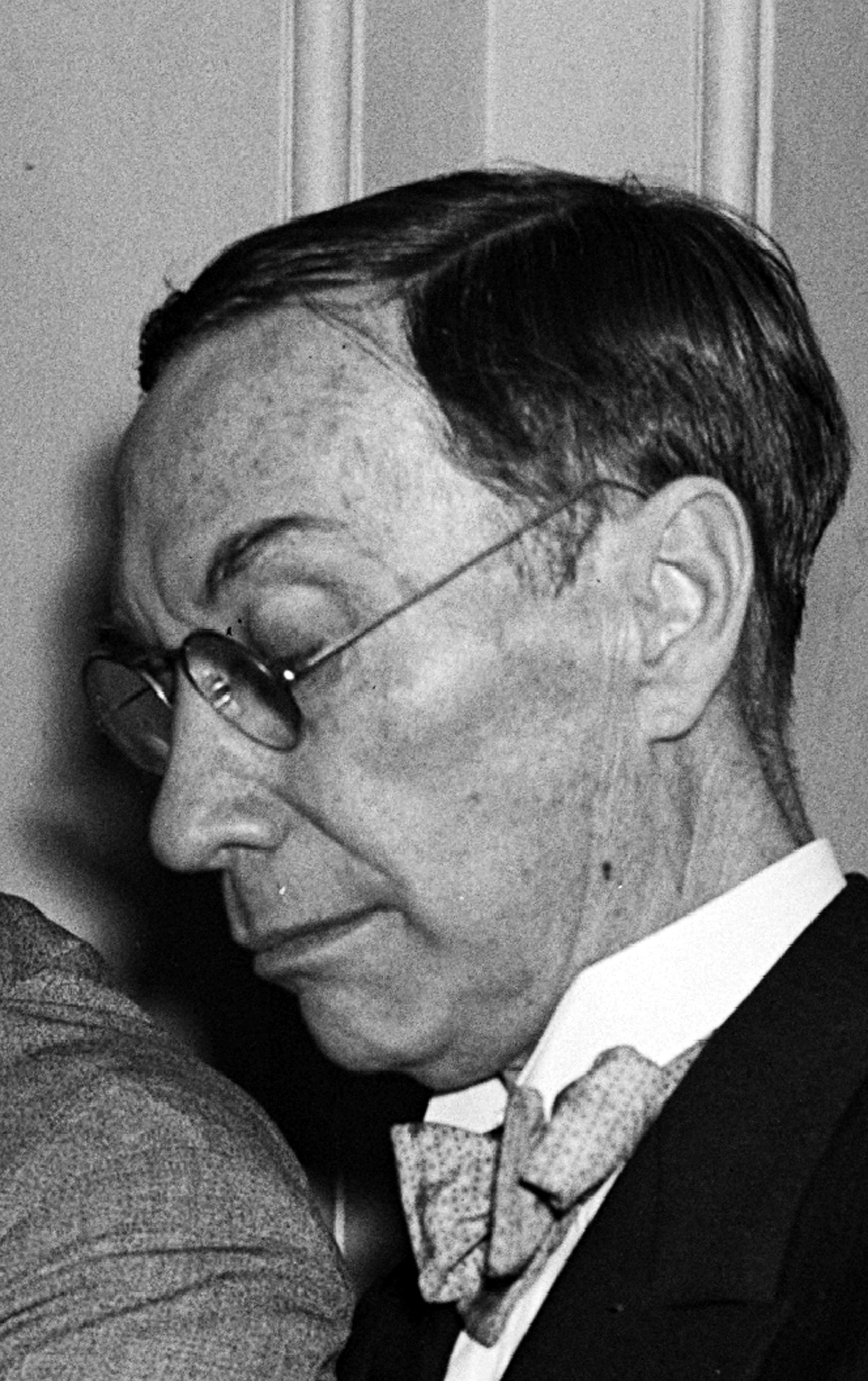
- J. Burrwood Daly, US Representative from Pennsylvania

Member of the U.S. House of Representatives from Pennsylvania's 4th district
- In office January 3, 1935 – March 12, 1939
- Preceded by: George W. Edmonds
- Succeeded by: John E. Sheridan

Personal details
- Born: John Burrwood Daly; February 13, 1872 Philadelphia, Pennsylvania, US
- Died: March 12, 1939 (aged 67) Philadelphia, Pennsylvania, US
- Party: Democratic

John Burrwood Daly (February 13, 1872 – March 12, 1939) was an American lawyer and politician who was elected to three terms as a Democratic member of the U.S. House of Representatives from Pennsylvania from 1935 to 1939.

== Biography ==
Daly was born in Philadelphia, Pennsylvania, the son of Irish immigrants. He graduated from La Salle College High School in Philadelphia in 1890 and from the University of Pennsylvania at Philadelphia in 1896.

=== Early career ===
He studied law, was admitted to the bar in 1896, and opened a private practice in Philadelphia. He served as assistant city solicitor from 1914 to 1922. He was a member of the faculty of La Salle College from 1923 to 1930.

=== Congress ===
Daly was elected as a Democrat to the Seventy-fourth, Seventy-fifth, and Seventy-sixth Congresses and served until his death in Philadelphia at the age of 67.

== See also ==
- List of members of the United States Congress who died in office (1900–1949)

== Sources ==
- United States Congress. "J. Burrwood Daly (id: D000014)". Biographical Directory of the United States Congress.

U.S. House of Representatives
Preceded by George W. Edmonds	Member of the U.S. House of Representatives from Pennsylvania's 4th congressional district January 3, 1935 – March 12, 1939	Succeeded by John E. Sheridan
