= W. S. Stuckey Jr. =

American politician

W. S. Stuckey
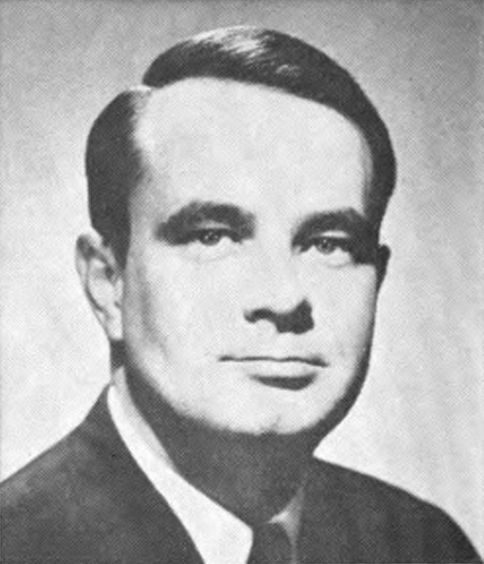

Member of the U.S. House of Representatives from Georgia's 8th district
- In office January 3, 1967 – January 3, 1977
- Preceded by: J. Russell Tuten
- Succeeded by: Billy Lee Evans

Personal details
- Born: Williamson Sylvester Stuckey Jr. May 25, 1935 (age 90) Eastman, Georgia, U.S.
- Party: Democratic
- Children: 3, including Scott and Stephanie
- Education: University of Georgia (BBA, LLB)

Williamson Sylvester Stuckey Jr. (born May 25, 1935) is an American former businessman and politician from the U.S. state of Georgia who served as a member of the United States House of Representatives from 1967 to 1977. He is a member of the Democratic Party. His father, W. S. Stuckey Sr., founded the Stuckey's chain of gift shops, of which Stuckey Jr. became president and CEO in 1985. He retired in 2019 and his daughter Stephanie Stuckey took over as President and CEO of the company.

Born in Eastman, Georgia, Stuckey graduated from Woodward Academy in 1952. He earned a B.B.A. in 1956 and a LL.B. in 1959, both from the University of Georgia. He was president of his family's various business holdings, including Stuckey's Stores, Stuckey Pecan Company, Stuckey Investments, and Stuckey Timberlands. He was elected as a Democrat to the 90th United States Congress and to the four succeeding Congresses (January 3, 1967 – January 3, 1977). He was not a candidate for reelection in 1976.

U.S. House of Representatives
Preceded by J. Russell Tuten	Member of the U.S. House of Representatives from Georgia's 8th congressional district 1967–1977	Succeeded by Billy Lee Evans
U.S. order of precedence (ceremonial)
Preceded by Leonard Lance as Former U.S. Representative	Order of precedence of the United States as Former U.S. Representative	Succeeded by R. Lindsay Thomas as Former U.S. Representative
