= John E. Sheridan (politician) =

American politician (1902–1987)

John Edward Sheridan (September 15, 1902 – November 12, 1987) was an American lawyer and politician who served four terms as a Democratic member of the U.S. House of Representatives from Pennsylvania from 1939 to 1947.

== Early life and education ==
Sheridan was born in Waterbury, Connecticut, the son of Irish immigrants. He graduated from the University of Pennsylvania in Philadelphia, in 1925 and from the law department of Temple University School of Law in Philadelphia in 1931.

== Early career ==
Sheridan served as deputy attorney general of Pennsylvania from 1934 to 1937. He was a member of the Board of Revision of Taxes in Philadelphia County, Pennsylvania, in 1937 and the Pennsylvania counsel for the Delaware River Bridge Commission in 1938 and 1939. He was a delegate to the Democratic National Conventions in 1932, 1936, 1940, and 1944.

=== Congress ===
Sheridan was elected as a Democrat to the 76th Congress to fill the vacancy caused by the death of J. Burrwood Daly and was re-elected to the Seventy-seventh, Seventy-eighth, and Seventy-ninth Congresses. He was not a candidate for reelection in 1946.

=== Later career ===
After his time in Congress, he served in the United States Air Force from 1954 to 1962, retiring as a colonel. He was a member of the County Board of Law Examiners from 1954 to 1965, and consul general for the Principality de Monaco in Philadelphia.

=== Death and burial ===
Sheridan died on November 12, 1987, and is buried in Arlington National Cemetery.

U.S. House of Representatives
Preceded by J. Burrwood Daly	Member of the U.S. House of Representatives from Pennsylvania's 4th congressional district November 7, 1939 – January 3, 1947	Succeeded by Franklin J. Maloney
