= J. Russell Tuten =

American politician from Georgia

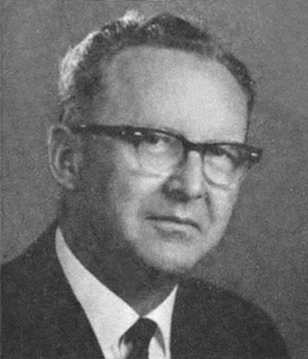

Member of the U.S. House of Representatives from Georgia's 8th district
- In office January 3, 1963 – January 3, 1967
- Preceded by: Iris Blitch
- Succeeded by: W. S. Stuckey Jr.

Personal details
- Born: James Russell Tuten; July 23, 1911 Appling County, Georgia
- Died: August 16, 1968 (aged 57)
- Party: Democratic
- Occupation: Businessman; Politician

James Russell Tuten (July 23, 1911 – August 16, 1968) was an American politician who served as a U.S. Representative from Georgia, serving two terms from 1963 to 1967.

== Early life and career ==
Tuten was born on a farm in Appling County, Georgia. He was educated in county public schools, South Georgia College at Douglas, and Georgia Southern College at Statesboro. Tuten engaged in farming, teaching, bricklaying, and business as a building contractor.

He was active in the government of Brunswick, Georgia, serving as a city commissioner from 1956 to 1962, and then mayor from 1958 and 1962. Tuten served as chairman of the board of trustees, Brewton–Parker College at Mount Vernon, Georgia.

== Congress ==
He was elected as a Democrat to the Eighty-eighth and Eighty-ninth Congresses (January 3, 1963 – January 3, 1967). However, he was an unsuccessful candidate for renomination in 1966.

Tuten was appointed as cochairman of the Coastal Plains Regional Commission in 1967.

== Death ==
He died in Falls Church, Virginia, August 16, 1968. Tuten was interred in Palmetto Cemetery, Brunswick, Georgia.

U.S. House of Representatives
Preceded by Iris Blitch	Member of the U.S. House of Representatives from Georgia's 8th congressional district January 3, 1963 – January 3, 1967	Succeeded by Williamson S. Stuckey, Jr.
