= W. Benjamin Gibbs =

American politician (1889–1940)

Member of the U.S. House of Representatives from Georgia's 8th district
- In office January 3, 1939 – August 7, 1940
- Preceded by: Braswell Deen
- Succeeded by: Florence R. Gibbs

Personal details
- Born: April 15, 1889 Dupont, Georgia, U.S.
- Died: August 7, 1940 (aged 51) Washington, D.C., U.S.
- Party: Democratic

Willis Benjamin Gibbs (April 15, 1889 – August 7, 1940) was a U.S. representative from Georgia, husband of Florence Reville Gibbs.

== Life ==
Born in Dupont, Georgia, Gibbs attended the public schools and Mercer University, Macon, Georgia. He was graduated from the Atlanta (Georgia) Law School in 1911. He was admitted to the bar and commenced practice in Folkston, Georgia, the same year. He moved to Jesup, Georgia, in 1912 and continued the practice of law. He served as solicitor of the city court of Jesup in 1913–1924, and solicitor general of the Brunswick judicial circuit in 1925–1939. County attorney for Wayne County, Georgia from 1922 to 1938. He served as lieutenant colonel on staff of Gov. Clifford Walker in 1924 and 1925. He served on the State Board of Control of Eleemosynary Institutions in 1931–1937.

Gibbs was elected as a Democrat to the Seventy-sixth Congress and served from January 3, 1939, until his death in Washington, D.C., on August 7, 1940. He was interred in Jesup Cemetery, Jesup, Georgia.

== See also ==
- List of members of the United States Congress who died in office (1900–1949)

U.S. House of Representatives
Preceded by Braswell Deen	Member of the U.S. House of Representatives from Georgia's 8th congressional district January 3, 1939 – August 7, 1940	Succeeded by Florence R. Gibbs
