= John S. Gibson =

American politician

John Strickland Gibson
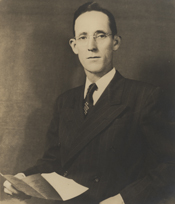

Member of the U.S. House of Representatives from Georgia's 8th district
- In office January 3, 1941 – January 3, 1947
- Preceded by: Florence R. Gibbs
- Succeeded by: William M. Wheeler

Personal details
- Born: January 3, 1893 Charlton County, Georgia, U.S.
- Died: October 19, 1960 (aged 67) Douglas, Georgia, U.S.
- Resting place: City Cemetery
- Party: Democratic

John Strickland Gibson (January 3, 1893 – October 19, 1960) was a U.S. representative from Georgia.

== Early years and education ==
Gibson was born near Folkston, Georgia in Charlton County on January 3, 1893, to William Owen Gibson and Julia Ann Vickery Gibson. He attended the common schools of his county. Upon graduation, he moved to Douglas, Georgia and subsequently attended Georgia State Normal College. Upon graduation, he married Bessie Thomas in April, 1917. Gibson began his legal studies at the office of George Mingledorff, while he finished a correspondence course from LaSalle Extension University of Chicago, Illinois in preparation for the bar exam. He was admitted to the bar in 1922 and commenced practice in Douglas in 1923. He was an aggressive courtroom lawyer who specialized in cross-examination and was known for his innate ability to sense the mood of the jury and for his colorful and frequently caustic methods of argument. He became one of Georgia's most feared and admired attorneys, and his excellence as a trial lawyer led to service as solicitor of the city court of Douglas from 1928 to 1934.

== Political career ==
In 1934 Gibson was elected as solicitor general of the Waycross judicial circuit, a position equivalent to today's district attorney. He retained that position until 1940.

Gibson's popularity continued to grow, and he was elected as a Democrat to the United States Congress from Georgia's Eighth District, when incumbent W. Ben Gibbs died in office in 1940. Gibson's first term was in the 77th United States Congress. He was re-elected two more times. His congressional career spanned the period January 3, 1941 – January 3, 1947. Congressman Gibson served the public tirelessly through the difficult years of World War II, and he is credited with playing a decisive role in the passing of the Servicemen's Readjustment Act of 1944, better known as the G.I. Bill. During the week of the D-Day invasion of Normandy, a House and Senate conference committee was deadlocked on the bill which would provide housing, education, and job benefits to returning veterans. Congressman Gibson received word that the bill was in jeopardy while he was at home in Douglas, Georgia, recovering from an illness, and in a spectacular overnight journey, he rushed to Washington to remind his peers that American soldiers needed their full support.

== Later years ==
When he was unable to secure renomination in 1946, he returned to Douglas, to resumed the practice of law. He died in Douglas, Georgia on October 19, 1960, and was interred in City Cemetery.

U.S. House of Representatives
Preceded by Florence R. Gibbs	Member of the U.S. House of Representatives from Georgia's 8th congressional district January 3, 1941 – January 3, 1947	Succeeded by William M. Wheeler
