= 76th United States Congress =

1939–1941 U.S. Congress

←	75th	77th	→
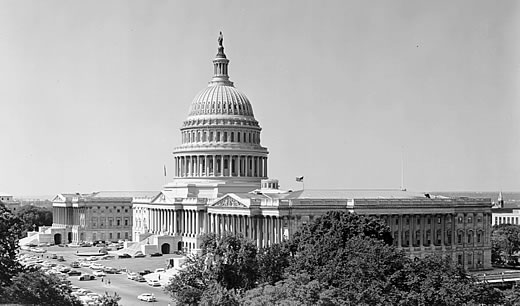
- United States Capitol (1956)

Overview
- Legislative body: United States Congress
- Jurisdiction: United States
- Term: January 3, 1939 – January 3, 1941

Senate
- Members: 96
- President: John N. Garner (D)
- President pro tempore: Key Pittman (D) (until November 10, 1940); William H. King (D) (from November 19, 1940)
- Party control: Democratic

House of Representatives
- Members: 435 representatives 5 non-voting delegates
- Speaker: William B. Bankhead (D) (until September 15, 1940); Sam Rayburn (D) (from September 16, 1940)
- Party control: Democratic

Sessions
- 1st: January 3, 1939 – August 5, 1939
- 2nd: September 21, 1939 – November 3, 1939
- 3rd: January 3, 1940 – January 3, 1941

The 76th United States Congress was a meeting of the legislative branch of the United States federal government, composed of the United States Senate and the United States House of Representatives. It met in Washington, D.C., from January 3, 1939, to January 3, 1941, during the seventh and eighth years of Franklin D. Roosevelt's presidency. The apportionment of seats in the House of Representatives was based on the 1930 United States census.

Both chambers had a Democratic majority - holding a supermajority in the Senate, but a greatly reduced majority in the House, thus losing the supermajority there. With President Roosevelt, the Democrats maintained an overall federal government trifecta.

The 76th is also the most recent Congress to have held a third session.

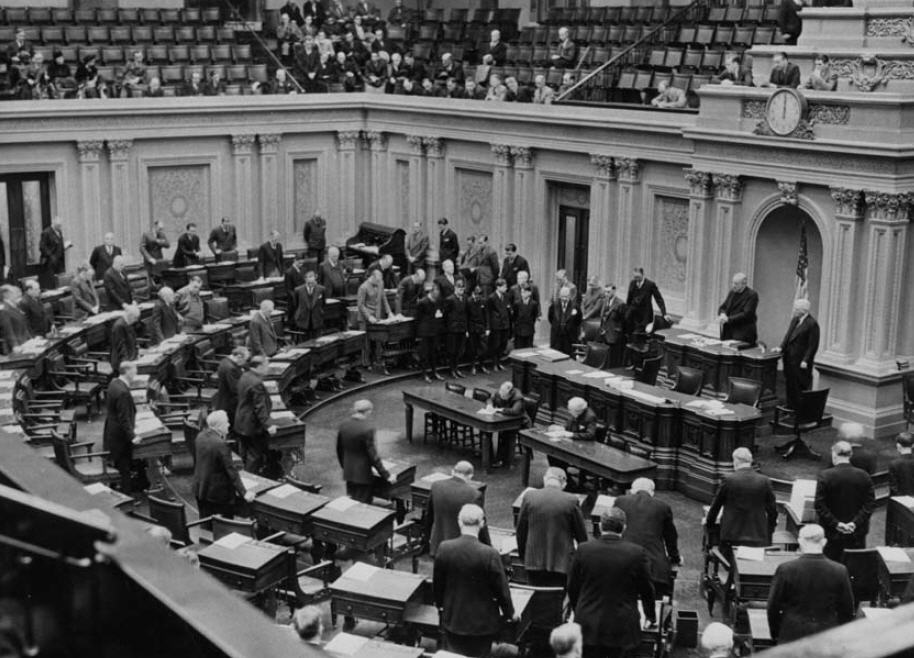
Chaplain of the United States Senate ZeBarney Thorne Phillips delivering prayer to open the session

== Major events ==
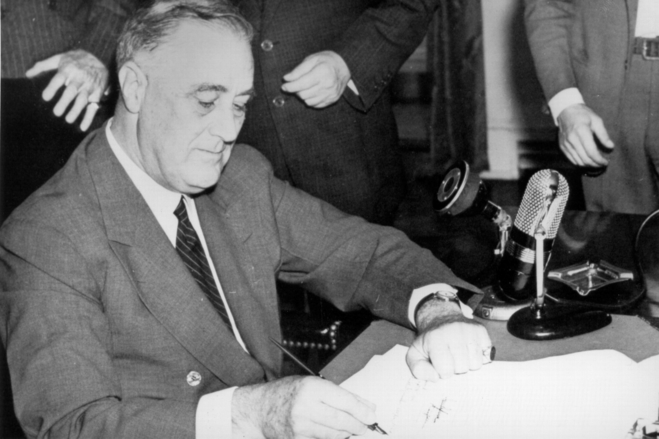
President Roosevelt signing the Selective Training and Service Act of 1940, September 16, 1940.

- April 9, 1939: African-American singer Marian Anderson performs before 75,000 people at the Lincoln Memorial in Washington, D.C., after having been denied the use both of Constitution Hall by the Daughters of the American Revolution, and of a public high school by the federally controlled District of Columbia.
- August 2, 1939: Leo Szilard wrote to President Franklin Roosevelt about developing the atomic bomb using uranium. This led to the creation of the Manhattan Project.
- September 5, 1939: World War II: The United States declares its neutrality in the war.
- November 4, 1939: World War II: President Roosevelt ordered the United States Customs Service to implement the Neutrality Act of 1939, allowing cash-and-carry purchases of weapons to non-belligerent nations.
- November 15, 1939: President Roosevelt laid the cornerstone of the Jefferson Memorial.
- April 1, 1940: April Fools' Day was also the census date for the 16th U.S. Census.
- May 16, 1940: World War II: President Roosevelt, addressed a joint session of Congress, asking for an extraordinary credit of approximately $900 million to finance construction of at least 50,000 airplanes per year.
- June 5, 1940: World War II: The United States Senate passes bill S4025 which allows the Department of Defense to sell outdated equipment to belligerents in wartime. In practice this allows the Roosevelt administration to sell certain navy vessels to Great Britain. The vote is watched closely by both the United Kingdom and Nazi Germany. The Nazis hope that the bill does not pass, the British hope that it will. The bill passes 67-18 in the United States Senate.
- June 10, 1940: World War II: President Roosevelt denounced Italy's actions with his "Stab in the Back" speech during the graduation ceremonies of the University of Virginia.
- July 10, 1940: World War II: The United States Senate votes to confirm Frank Knox as Secretary of the Navy. The British hope he will be confirmed as he was openly sympathetic to them. Islationist Senators such as Burton K. Wheeler and Ellison D. Smith vote against the confirmation.
- August 4, 1940: World War II: Gen. John J. Pershing, in a nationwide radio broadcast, urges all-out aid to Britain in order to defend the Americas, while Charles Lindbergh speaks to an isolationist rally at Soldier Field in Chicago.
- September, 1940: The Army's 45th Infantry Division (previously a National Guard Division in Arizona, Colorado, New Mexico, and Oklahoma), was activated and ordered into federal service for 1 year, to engage in a training program in Ft. Sill and Louisiana, prior to serving in World War II.
- September 2, 1940: World War II: An agreement between America and Great Britain was announced to the effect that 50 U.S. destroyers needed for escort work would be transferred to Great Britain. In return, America gained 99-year leases on British bases in the North Atlantic, West Indies and Bermuda.
- September 26, 1940: World War II: The United States imposed a total embargo on all scrap metal shipments to Japan.
- October 16, 1940: The draft registration of approximately 16 million men began in the United States.
- October 29, 1940: The Selective Service System lottery was held in Washington, D.C.
- November 5, 1940: U.S. presidential election, 1940: Democratic incumbent Franklin D. Roosevelt defeated Republican challenger Wendell Willkie and became the United States's first and only third-term president.
- November 12, 1940: Case of Hansberry v. Lee, 311 U.S. 32 (1940), decided, allowing a racially restrictive covenant to be lifted.
- December 17, 1940: President Roosevelt, at his regular press conference, first outlined his plan to send aid to Great Britain that will become known as Lend-Lease.
- December 29, 1940: Franklin D. Roosevelt, in a fireside chat to the nation, declared that the United States must become "the great arsenal of democracy."
- January 13, 1941: All persons born in Puerto Rico after this day were declared U.S. citizens by birth, through federal law 8 U.S.C. § 1402.
- January 20, 1941: Chief Justice Charles Evans Hughes swore in President Roosevelt for a third term.
- January 27, 1941: World War II: U.S. Ambassador to Japan Joseph C. Grew passed on to Washington a rumor overheard at a diplomatic reception about a planned surprise attack upon Pearl Harbor, Hawaii.
- February 4, 1941: World War II: The United Service Organization (USO) was created to entertain American troops.

== Hearings ==
- January 23, 1941: Aviator Charles Lindbergh testified before the Congress and recommends that the United States negotiate a neutrality pact with Adolf Hitler.

== Major legislation ==
- April 3, 1939: Reorganization Act of 1939, Pub. L. 76–19, 53 Stat. 561
- August 2, 1939: Hatch Act of 1939 ("Hatch Political Activity Act", "An Act to Prevent Pernicious Political Activities"), ch. 410, 53 Stat. 1147
- November 4, 1939: Neutrality Act of 1939, ("Cash and Carry Act"), ch. 2, 54 Stat. 4
- June 29, 1940: Alien Registration Act (Smith Act), 3d sess. ch. 439, 54 Stat. 670
- August 22, 1940: Act of August 22, 1940, ch. 686, Pub. L. 76–768, 54 Stat. 789 (including Investment Company Act of 1940, Investment Advisers Act of 1940)
- September 16, 1940: Selective Training and Service Act of 1940, Pub. L. 76–783

== Party summary ==
=== Senate ===
	Party (shading shows control)					Total	Vacant
	Democratic (D)	Farmer– Labor (FL)	Wisconsin Progressive (P)	Republican (R)	Independent (I)	Total	Vacant
End of previous congress	74	2	1	18	1	96	0
Begin	69	2	1	23	1	96	0
End	68	1	1	25	1	96	0
Final voting share	70.8%	1.0%	1.0%	26.0%	1.0%		
Beginning of next congress	66	0	1	27	1	95	1

=== House of Representatives ===
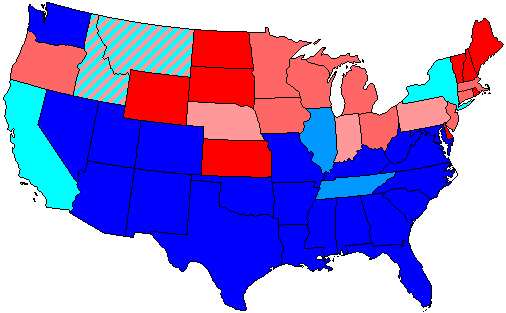
House seats by party holding plurality in state: 80+% to 100% Democratic / 80+% to 100% Republican; 60+% to 80% Democratic / 60+% to 80% Republican; Up to 60% Democratic / Up to 60% Republican

	Party (shading shows control)						Total	Vacant
	Democratic (D)	Farmer– Labor (FL)	American Labor (AL)	Wisconsin Progressive (WP)	Republican (R)	Other (O)	Total	Vacant
End of previous congress	324	5	0	7	89	1 (Note: Progressive)	426	9
Begin	260	1	1	2	169	1	434	1
End	256	1	1	2	167	1	428	7
Final voting share	59.8%	0.2%	0.2%	0.5%	39.0%	0.2%		
Beginning of next congress	268	1	1	3	162	0	435	0

== Leadership ==
=== Senate ===
- President: John N. Garner (D)
- President pro tempore: Key Pittman (D), until November 10, 1940 (died)
  - William H. King (D), from November 19, 1940

==== Majority (Democratic) leadership ====
- Majority Leader: Alben W. Barkley
- Majority Whip: Sherman Minton
- Democratic Caucus Secretary: Joshua B. Lee

==== Minority (Republican) leadership ====
- Minority Leader: Charles McNary
- Republican Conference Secretary: Frederick Hale
- National Senatorial Committee Chair: John G. Townsend Jr.

=== House of Representatives ===
- Speaker: William B. Bankhead (D), until September 15, 1940 (died)
  - Sam Rayburn (D), from September 16, 1940

==== Majority (Democratic) leadership ====
- Majority Leader: Sam Rayburn, until September 16, 1940
  - John W. McCormack, from September 16, 1940
- Democratic Whip: Patrick J. Boland
- Democratic Caucus Chairman: John W. McCormack, until September 16, 1940
- Democratic Campaign Committee Chairman: Patrick H. Drewry

==== Minority (Republican) leadership ====
- Minority Leader: Joseph William Martin Jr.
- Republican Whip: Harry Lane Englebright
- Republican Conference Chairman: Roy O. Woodruff
- Republican Campaign Committee Chairman: J. William Ditter

== Members ==
=== Senate ===
Senators were popularly elected statewide every two years, with one-third beginning new six-year terms with each Congress. Preceding the names in the list below are Senate class numbers, which indicate the cycle of their election, In this Congress, Class 1 meant their term ended with this Congress, requiring reelection in 1940; Class 2 meant their term began in the last Congress, requiring reelection in 1942; and Class 3 meant their term began in this Congress, requiring reelection in 1944.

==== Alabama ====
▌2. John H. Bankhead II (D)
▌3. J. Lister Hill (D)

==== Arizona ====
▌1. Henry F. Ashurst (D)
▌3. Carl Hayden (D)

==== Arkansas ====
▌2. John E. Miller (D)
▌3. Hattie Caraway (D)

==== California ====
▌1. Hiram W. Johnson (R)
▌3. Sheridan Downey (D)

==== Colorado ====
▌2. Edwin C. Johnson (D)
▌3. Alva B. Adams (D)

==== Connecticut ====
▌1. Francis T. Maloney (D)
▌3. John A. Danaher (R)

==== Delaware ====
▌1. John G. Townsend Jr. (R)
▌2. James H. Hughes (D)

==== Florida ====
▌1. Charles O. Andrews (D)
▌3. Claude Pepper (D)

==== Georgia ====
▌2. Richard Russell Jr. (D)
▌3. Walter F. George (D)

==== Idaho ====
▌2. William Edgar Borah (R), until January 19, 1940

▌John Thomas (R), from January 27, 1940

▌3. D. Worth Clark (D)

==== Illinois ====
▌2. James Hamilton Lewis (D), until April 9, 1939

▌James M. Slattery (D), April 14, 1939 – November 21, 1940
▌Charles W. Brooks (R), from November 22, 1940

▌3. Scott W. Lucas (D)

==== Indiana ====
▌1. Sherman Minton (D)
▌3. Frederick Van Nuys (D)

==== Iowa ====
▌2. Clyde L. Herring (D)
▌3. Guy M. Gillette (D)

==== Kansas ====
▌2. Arthur Capper (R)
▌3. Clyde M. Reed (R)

==== Kentucky ====
▌2. Marvel M. Logan (D), until October 3, 1939

▌Happy Chandler (D), from October 10, 1939

▌3. Alben Barkley (D)

==== Louisiana ====
▌2. Allen J. Ellender (D)
▌3. James H. Overton (D)

==== Maine ====
▌1. Frederick Hale (R)
▌2. Wallace H. White Jr. (R)

==== Maryland ====
▌1. George L. P. Radcliffe (D)
▌3. Millard Tydings (D)

==== Massachusetts ====
▌1. David I. Walsh (D)
▌2. Henry Cabot Lodge Jr. (R)

==== Michigan ====
▌1. Arthur H. Vandenberg (R)
▌2. Prentiss M. Brown (D)

==== Minnesota ====
▌1. Henrik Shipstead (FL)
▌2. Ernest Lundeen (FL), until August 31, 1940

▌Joseph H. Ball (R), from October 14, 1940

==== Mississippi ====
▌1. Theodore G. Bilbo (D)
▌2. Pat Harrison (D)

==== Missouri ====
▌1. Harry S. Truman (D)
▌3. Bennett Champ Clark (D)

==== Montana ====
▌1. Burton K. Wheeler (D)
▌2. James E. Murray (D)

==== Nebraska ====
▌1. Edward R. Burke (D)
▌2. George W. Norris (I)

==== Nevada ====
▌1. Key Pittman (D), until November 10, 1940

▌Berkeley L. Bunker (D), from November 27, 1940

▌3. Patrick A. McCarran (D)

==== New Hampshire ====
▌2. Styles Bridges (R)
▌3. Charles W. Tobey (R)

==== New Jersey ====
▌1. William Warren Barbour (R)
▌2. William H. Smathers (D)

==== New Mexico ====
▌1. Dennis Chávez (D)
▌2. Carl Hatch (D)

==== New York ====
▌1. James M. Mead (D)
▌3. Robert F. Wagner (D)

==== North Carolina ====
▌2. Josiah William Bailey (D)
▌3. Robert R. Reynolds (D)

==== North Dakota ====
▌1. Lynn Frazier (R-NPL)
▌3. Gerald Nye (R)

==== Ohio ====
▌1. A. Victor Donahey (D)
▌3. Robert A. Taft (R)

==== Oklahoma ====
▌2. Joshua B. Lee (D)
▌3. Elmer Thomas (D)

==== Oregon ====
▌2. Charles L. McNary (R)
▌3. Rufus C. Holman (R)

==== Pennsylvania ====
▌1. Joseph F. Guffey (D)
▌3. James J. Davis (R)

==== Rhode Island ====
▌1. Peter G. Gerry (D)
▌2. Theodore F. Green (D)

==== South Carolina ====
▌2. James F. Byrnes (D)
▌3. Ellison D. Smith (D)

==== South Dakota ====
▌2. William J. Bulow (D)
▌3. John Chandler Gurney (R)

==== Tennessee ====
▌1. Kenneth D. McKellar (D)
▌2. Tom Stewart (D)

==== Texas ====
▌1. Thomas T. Connally (D)
▌2. Morris Sheppard (D)

==== Utah ====
▌1. William H. King (D)
▌3. Elbert D. Thomas (D)

==== Vermont ====
▌1. Warren Austin (R)
▌3. Ernest Willard Gibson (R), until June 20, 1940

▌Ernest W. Gibson Jr. (R), from June 24, 1940

==== Virginia ====
▌1. Harry F. Byrd (D)
▌2. Carter Glass (D)

==== Washington ====
▌1. Lewis B. Schwellenbach (D), until December 16, 1940

▌Monrad Wallgren (D), from December 19, 1940

▌3. Homer Bone (D)

==== West Virginia ====
▌1. Rush D. Holt Sr. (D)
▌2. Matthew M. Neely (D)

==== Wisconsin ====
▌1. Robert M. La Follette Jr. (P)
▌3. Alexander Wiley (R)

==== Wyoming ====
▌1. Joseph C. O'Mahoney (D)
▌2. Henry H. Schwartz (D)

Senators' party membership by state at the opening of the 76th Congress in January 1939. The green stripes denote Senator Robert M. La Follette Jr. of the Progressive Party, and the yellow strips denote independent Senator George W. Norris. 2 Democrats 1 Democrat and 1 Republican 2 Republicans 2 Farmer-Laborers

=== House of Representatives ===
The names of representatives are preceded by their district numbers.

==== Alabama ====
▌1. Frank W. Boykin (D)
▌2. George M. Grant (D)
▌3. Henry B. Steagall (D)
▌4. Sam Hobbs (D)
▌5. Joe Starnes (D)
▌6. Pete Jarman (D)
▌7. William B. Bankhead (D), until September 15, 1940

▌Zadoc L. Weatherford (D). from November 5, 1940

▌8. John J. Sparkman (D)
▌9. Luther Patrick (D)

==== Arizona ====
▌At-large. John R. Murdock (D)

==== Arkansas ====
▌1. Ezekiel C. Gathings (D)
▌2. Wilbur Mills (D)
▌3. Clyde T. Ellis (D)
▌4. William B. Cravens (D), until January 13, 1939

▌William Fadjo Cravens (D), from September 12, 1939

▌5. David D. Terry (D)
▌6. William F. Norrell (D)
▌7. Wade H. Kitchens (D)

==== California ====
▌1. Clarence F. Lea (D)
▌2. Harry L. Englebright (R)
▌3. Frank H. Buck (D)
▌4. Franck R. Havenner (P)
▌5. Richard J. Welch (R)
▌6. Albert E. Carter (R)
▌7. John H. Tolan (D)
▌8. Jack Z. Anderson (R)
▌9. Bertrand W. Gearhart (R)
▌10. Alfred J. Elliott (D)
▌11. John Carl Hinshaw (R)
▌12. Jerry Voorhis (D)
▌13. Charles Kramer (D)
▌14. Thomas F. Ford (D)
▌15. John M. Costello (D)
▌16. Leland M. Ford (R)
▌17. Lee E. Geyer (D)
▌18. Thomas M. Eaton (R), until September 16, 1939
▌19. Harry R. Sheppard (D)
▌20. Edouard V. M. Izac (D)

==== Colorado ====
▌1. Lawrence Lewis (D)
▌2. Fred N. Cummings (D)
▌3. John A. Martin (D), until December 23, 1939

▌William E. Burney (D), from November 5, 1940

▌4. Edward T. Taylor (D)

==== Connecticut ====
▌1. William J. Miller (R)
▌2. Thomas R. Ball (R)
▌3. James A. Shanley (D)
▌4. Albert E. Austin (R)
▌5. J. Joseph Smith (D)
▌At-large. B. J. Monkiewicz (R)

==== Delaware ====
▌At-large. George S. Williams (R)

==== Florida ====
▌1. J. Hardin Peterson (D)
▌2. Robert A. Green (D)
▌3. Millard F. Caldwell (D)
▌4. Pat Cannon (D)
▌5. Joe Hendricks (D)

==== Georgia ====
▌1. Hugh Peterson (D)
▌2. Edward E. Cox (D)
▌3. Stephen Pace (D)
▌4. Emmett M. Owen (D), until June 21, 1939

▌Albert Sidney Camp (D), from August 1, 1939

▌5. Robert Ramspeck (D)
▌6. Carl Vinson (D)
▌7. Malcolm C. Tarver (D)
▌8. W. Benjamin Gibbs (D), until August 7, 1940

▌Florence R. Gibbs (D), from October 1, 1940

▌9. B. Frank Whelchel (D)
▌10. Paul Brown (D)

==== Idaho ====
▌1. Compton I. White (D)
▌2. Henry Dworshak (R)

==== Illinois ====
▌1. Arthur W. Mitchell (D)
▌2. Raymond S. McKeough (D)
▌3. Edward A. Kelly (D)
▌4. Harry P. Beam (D)
▌5. Adolph J. Sabath (D)
▌6. A. F. Maciejewski (D)
▌7. Leonard W. Schuetz (D)
▌8. Leo Kocialkowski (D)
▌9. James McAndrews (D)
▌10. Ralph E. Church (R)
▌11. Chauncey W. Reed (R)
▌12. Noah M. Mason (R)
▌13. Leo E. Allen (R)
▌14. Anton J. Johnson (R)
▌15. Robert B. Chiperfield (R)
▌16. Everett M. Dirksen (R)
▌17. Leslie C. Arends (R)
▌18. Jessie Sumner (R)
▌19. William H. Wheat (R)
▌20. James M. Barnes (D)
▌21. Frank W. Fries (D)
▌22. Edwin M. Schaefer (D)
▌23. Laurence F. Arnold (D)
▌24. Claude V. Parsons (D)
▌25. Kent E. Keller (D)
▌At-large. John C. Martin (D)
▌At-large. Thomas V. Smith (D)

==== Indiana ====
▌1. William T. Schulte (D)
▌2. Charles A. Halleck (R)
▌3. Robert A. Grant (R)
▌4. George W. Gillie (R)
▌5. Forest Harness (R)
▌6. Noble J. Johnson (R)
▌7. Gerald W. Landis (R)
▌8. John W. Boehne Jr. (D)
▌9. Eugene B. Crowe (D)
▌10. Raymond S. Springer (R)
▌11. William H. Larrabee (D)
▌12. Louis Ludlow (D)

==== Iowa ====
▌1. Thomas E. Martin (R)
▌2. William S. Jacobsen (D)
▌3. John W. Gwynne (R)
▌4. Henry O. Talle (R)
▌5. Karl M. LeCompte (R)
▌6. Cassius C. Dowell (R), until February 4, 1940

▌Robert K. Goodwin (R), from March 5, 1940

▌7. Ben F. Jensen (R)
▌8. Fred C. Gilchrist (R)
▌9. Vincent F. Harrington (D)

==== Kansas ====
▌1. William P. Lambertson (R)
▌2. Ulysses S. Guyer (R)
▌3. Thomas Daniel Winter (R)
▌4. Edward Herbert Rees (R)
▌5. John Mills Houston (D)
▌6. Frank Carlson (R)
▌7. Clifford R. Hope (R)

==== Kentucky ====
▌1. Noble J. Gregory (D)
▌2. Beverly M. Vincent (D)
▌3. Emmet O'Neal (D)
▌4. Edward W. Creal (D)
▌5. Brent Spence (D)
▌6. Virgil Chapman (D)
▌7. Andrew J. May (D)
▌8. Joe B. Bates (D)
▌9. John M. Robsion (R)

==== Louisiana ====
▌1. Joachim O. Fernández (D)
▌2. Paul H. Maloney (D), until December 15, 1940
▌3. Robert L. Mouton (D)
▌4. Overton Brooks (D)
▌5. Newt V. Mills (D)
▌6. John K. Griffith (D)
▌7. René L. DeRouen (D)
▌8. A. Leonard Allen (D)

==== Maine ====
▌1. James C. Oliver (R)
▌2. Clyde H. Smith (R), until April 8, 1940

▌Margaret Chase Smith (R), from June 3, 1940

▌3. Ralph Owen Brewster (R)

==== Maryland ====
▌1. T. Alan Goldsborough (D), until April 5, 1939

▌David Jenkins Ward (D), from June 8, 1939

▌2. William P. Cole Jr. (D)
▌3. Thomas D'Alesandro Jr. (D)
▌4. Ambrose J. Kennedy (D)
▌5. Lansdale G. Sasscer (D), from February 3, 1939
▌6. William D. Byron (D)

==== Massachusetts ====
▌1. Allen T. Treadway (R)
▌2. Charles Clason (R)
▌3. Joseph E. Casey (D)
▌4. Pehr G. Holmes (R)
▌5. Edith Nourse Rogers (R)
▌6. George J. Bates (R)
▌7. Lawrence J. Connery (D)
▌8. Arthur D. Healey (D)
▌9. Robert Luce (R)
▌10. George H. Tinkham (R)
▌11. Thomas A. Flaherty (D)
▌12. John W. McCormack (D)
▌13. Richard B. Wigglesworth (R)
▌14. Joseph W. Martin Jr. (R)
▌15. Charles L. Gifford (R)

==== Michigan ====
▌1. Rudolph G. Tenerowicz (D)
▌2. Earl C. Michener (R)
▌3. Paul W. Shafer (R)
▌4. Clare E. Hoffman (R)
▌5. Carl Mapes (R), until December 12, 1939

▌Bartel J. Jonkman (R), from February 19, 1940

▌6. William W. Blackney (R)
▌7. Jesse P. Wolcott (R)
▌8. Fred L. Crawford (R)
▌9. Albert J. Engel (R)
▌10. Roy O. Woodruff (R)
▌11. Fred Bradley (R)
▌12. Frank Hook (D)
▌13. Clarence J. McLeod (R)
▌14. Louis C. Rabaut (D)
▌15. John D. Dingell Sr. (D)
▌16. John Lesinski Sr. (D)
▌17. George A. Dondero (R)

==== Minnesota ====
▌1. August H. Andresen (R)
▌2. Elmer Ryan (D)
▌3. John G. Alexander (R)
▌4. Melvin Maas (R)
▌5. Oscar Youngdahl (R)
▌6. Harold Knutson (R)
▌7. Herman Carl Andersen (R)
▌8. William Pittenger (R)
▌9. Rich T. Buckler (FL)

==== Mississippi ====
▌1. John E. Rankin (D)
▌2. Wall Doxey (D)
▌3. William M. Whittington (D)
▌4. Aaron L. Ford (D)
▌5. Ross A. Collins (D)
▌6. William M. Colmer (D)
▌7. Dan R. McGehee (D)

==== Missouri ====
▌1. Milton A. Romjue (D)
▌2. William L. Nelson (D)
▌3. Richard M. Duncan (D)
▌4. C. Jasper Bell (D)
▌5. Joseph B. Shannon (D)
▌6. Reuben T. Wood (D)
▌7. Dewey Short (R)
▌8. Clyde Williams (D)
▌9. Clarence Cannon (D)
▌10. Orville Zimmerman (D)
▌11. Thomas C. Hennings Jr. (D), until December 31, 1940
▌12. Charles Arthur Anderson (D)
▌13. John J. Cochran (D)

==== Montana ====
▌1. Jacob Thorkelson (R)
▌2. James F. O'Connor (D)

==== Nebraska ====
▌1. George H. Heinke (R), until January 2, 1940

▌John Hyde Sweet (R), from April 19, 1940

▌2. Charles F. McLaughlin (D)
▌3. Karl Stefan (R)
▌4. Carl Curtis (R)
▌5. Harry B. Coffee (D)

==== Nevada ====
▌At-large. James G. Scrugham (D)

==== New Hampshire ====
▌1. Arthur B. Jenks (R)
▌2. Foster Waterman Stearns (R)

==== New Jersey ====
▌1. Charles A. Wolverton (R)
▌2. Walter S. Jeffries (R)
▌3. William H. Sutphin (D)
▌4. D. Lane Powers (R)
▌5. Charles A. Eaton (R)
▌6. Donald H. McLean (R)
▌7. J. Parnell Thomas (R)
▌8. George N. Seger (R), until August 26, 1940
▌9. Frank C. Osmers Jr. (R)
▌10. Fred A. Hartley Jr. (R)
▌11. Albert L. Vreeland (R)
▌12. Robert Kean (R)
▌13. Mary T. Norton (D)
▌14. Edward J. Hart (D)

==== New Mexico ====
▌At-large. John J. Dempsey (D)

==== New York ====
▌1. Leonard W. Hall (R)
▌2. William B. Barry (D)
▌3. Joseph L. Pfeifer (D)
▌4. Thomas H. Cullen (D)
▌5. Marcellus H. Evans (D)
▌6. Andrew L. Somers (D)
▌7. John J. Delaney (D)
▌8. Donald L. O'Toole (D)
▌9. Eugene J. Keogh (D)
▌10. Emanuel Celler (D)
▌11. James A. O'Leary (D)
▌12. Samuel Dickstein (D)
▌13. Christopher D. Sullivan (D)
▌14. William I. Sirovich (D), until December 17, 1939

▌Morris Michael Edelstein (D), from February 6, 1940

▌15. Michael J. Kennedy (D)
▌16. James H. Fay (D)
▌17. Bruce F. Barton (R)
▌18. Martin J. Kennedy (D)
▌19. Sol Bloom (D)
▌20. Vito Marcantonio (AL)
▌21. Joseph A. Gavagan (D)
▌22. Edward W. Curley (D), until January 6, 1940

▌Walter A. Lynch (D), from February 20, 1940

▌23. Charles A. Buckley (D)
▌24. James M. Fitzpatrick (D)
▌25. Ralph A. Gamble (R)
▌26. Hamilton Fish III (R)
▌27. Lewis K. Rockefeller (R)
▌28. William T. Byrne (D)
▌29. E. Harold Cluett (R)
▌30. Frank Crowther (R)
▌31. Wallace E. Pierce (R), until January 3, 1940

▌Clarence E. Kilburn (R), from February 13, 1940

▌32. Francis D. Culkin (R)
▌33. Fred J. Douglas (R)
▌34. Bert Lord (R), until May 24, 1939

▌Edwin Arthur Hall (R), from November 7, 1939

▌35. Clarence E. Hancock (R)
▌36. John Taber (R)
▌37. W. Sterling Cole (R)
▌38. Joseph J. O'Brien (R)
▌39. James W. Wadsworth Jr. (R)
▌40. Walter G. Andrews (R)
▌41. J. Francis Harter (R)
▌42. Pius Schwert (D)
▌43. Daniel A. Reed (R)
▌At-large. Matthew J. Merritt (D)
▌At-large. Caroline O'Day (D)

==== North Carolina ====
▌1. Lindsay C. Warren (D), until October 31, 1940

▌Herbert Covington Bonner (D), from November 5, 1940

▌2. John H. Kerr (D)
▌3. Graham A. Barden (D)
▌4. Harold D. Cooley (D)
▌5. Alonzo D. Folger (D)
▌6. Carl T. Durham (D)
▌7. J. Bayard Clark (D)
▌8. William O. Burgin (D)
▌9. Robert L. Doughton (D)
▌10. Alfred L. Bulwinkle (D)
▌11. Zebulon Weaver (D)

==== North Dakota ====
▌At-large. William Lemke (R-NPL)
▌At-large. Usher L. Burdick (R-NPL)

==== Ohio ====
▌1. Charles H. Elston (R)
▌2. William E. Hess (R)
▌3. Harry N. Routzohn (R)
▌4. Robert Franklin Jones (R)
▌5. Cliff Clevenger (R)
▌6. James G. Polk (D)
▌7. Clarence J. Brown (R)
▌8. Frederick Cleveland Smith (R)
▌9. John F. Hunter (D)
▌10. Thomas A. Jenkins (R)
▌11. Harold K. Claypool (D)
▌12. John M. Vorys (R)
▌13. Dudley A. White (R)
▌14. Dow W. Harter (D)
▌15. Robert T. Secrest (D)
▌16. James Seccombe (R)
▌17. William A. Ashbrook (D), until January 1, 1940

▌J. Harry McGregor (R), from February 27, 1940

▌18. Earl R. Lewis (R)
▌19. Michael J. Kirwan (D)
▌20. Martin L. Sweeney (D)
▌21. Robert Crosser (D)
▌22. Chester C. Bolton (R), until October 29, 1939

▌Frances P. Bolton (R), from February 27, 1940

▌At-large. George H. Bender (R)
▌At-large. L. L. Marshall (R)

==== Oklahoma ====
▌1. Wesley E. Disney (D)
▌2. John Conover Nichols (D)
▌3. Wilburn Cartwright (D)
▌4. Lyle Boren (D)
▌5. A. S. Mike Monroney (D)
▌6. Jed J. Johnson (D)
▌7. Sam C. Massingale (D)
▌8. Phil Ferguson (D)
▌At-large. Will Rogers (D)

==== Oregon ====
▌1. James W. Mott (R)
▌2. Walter M. Pierce (D)
▌3. Homer D. Angell (R)

==== Pennsylvania ====
▌1. Leon Sacks (D)
▌2. James P. McGranery (D)
▌3. Michael J. Bradley (D)
▌4. J. Burrwood Daly (D), until March 12, 1939

▌John E. Sheridan (D), from November 7, 1939

▌5. Fred C. Gartner (R)
▌6. Francis J. Myers (D)
▌7. George P. Darrow (R)
▌8. James Wolfenden (R)
▌9. Charles L. Gerlach (R)
▌10. J. Roland Kinzer (R)
▌11. Patrick J. Boland (D)
▌12. J. Harold Flannery (D)
▌13. Ivor D. Fenton (R)
▌14. Guy L. Moser (D)
▌15. Albert G. Rutherford (R)
▌16. Robert F. Rich (R)
▌17. J. William Ditter (R)
▌18. Richard M. Simpson (R)
▌19. John C. Kunkel (R)
▌20. Benjamin Jarrett (R)
▌21. Francis E. Walter (D)
▌22. Chester H. Gross (R)
▌23. James E. Van Zandt (R)
▌24. J. Buell Snyder (D)
▌25. Charles I. Faddis (D)
▌26. Louis E. Graham (R)
▌27. Harve Tibbott (R)
▌28. Robert G. Allen (D)
▌29. Robert L. Rodgers (R)
▌30. Robert J. Corbett (R)
▌31. John McDowell (R)
▌32. Herman P. Eberharter (D)
▌33. Joseph A. McArdle (D)
▌34. Matthew A. Dunn (D)

==== Rhode Island ====
▌1. Charles Risk (R)
▌2. Harry Sandager (R)

==== South Carolina ====
▌1. Thomas S. McMillan (D), until September 29, 1939

▌Clara Gooding McMillan (D), from November 7, 1939

▌2. Hampton P. Fulmer (D)
▌3. Butler B. Hare (D)
▌4. Joseph R. Bryson (D)
▌5. James P. Richards (D)
▌6. John L. McMillan (D)

==== South Dakota ====
▌1. Karl E. Mundt (R)
▌2. Francis Case (R)

==== Tennessee ====
▌1. B. Carroll Reece (R)
▌2. J. Will Taylor (R), until November 14, 1939

▌John Jennings Jr. (R), from December 30, 1939

▌3. Samuel D. McReynolds (D), until July 11, 1939

▌Estes Kefauver (D), from September 13, 1939

▌4. Albert Gore Sr. (D)
▌5. Jo Byrns Jr. (D)
▌6. Clarence W. Turner (D), until March 23, 1939

▌W. Wirt Courtney (D), from May 11, 1939

▌7. Herron C. Pearson (D)
▌8. Jere Cooper (D)
▌9. Walter Chandler (D), until January 2, 1940

▌Clifford Davis (D), from February 15, 1940

==== Texas ====
▌1. Wright Patman (D)
▌2. Martin Dies Jr. (D)
▌3. Lindley Beckworth (D)
▌4. Sam Rayburn (D)
▌5. Hatton W. Sumners (D)
▌6. Luther Alexander Johnson (D)
▌7. Nat Patton (D)
▌8. Albert Thomas (D)
▌9. Joseph J. Mansfield (D)
▌10. Lyndon B. Johnson (D)
▌11. William R. Poage (D)
▌12. Fritz G. Lanham (D)
▌13. Ed Gossett (D)
▌14. Richard M. Kleberg (D)
▌15. Milton H. West (D)
▌16. R. Ewing Thomason (D)
▌17. Clyde L. Garrett (D)
▌18. John Marvin Jones (D), until November 20, 1940
▌19. George H. Mahon (D)
▌20. Paul J. Kilday (D)
▌21. Charles L. South (D)

==== Utah ====
▌1. Abe Murdock (D)
▌2. J. W. Robinson (D)

==== Vermont ====
▌At-large. Charles A. Plumley (R)

==== Virginia ====
▌1. S. Otis Bland (D)
▌2. Colgate W. Darden Jr. (D)
▌3. Dave E. Satterfield Jr. (D)
▌4. Patrick H. Drewry (D)
▌5. Thomas G. Burch (D)
▌6. Clifton A. Woodrum (D)
▌7. A. Willis Robertson (D)
▌8. Howard W. Smith (D)
▌9. John W. Flannagan Jr. (D)

==== Washington ====
▌1. Warren G. Magnuson (D)
▌2. Monrad C. Wallgren (D), until December 19, 1940
▌3. Martin F. Smith (D)
▌4. Knute Hill (D)
▌5. Charles H. Leavy (D)
▌6. John M. Coffee (D)

==== West Virginia ====
▌1. A. C. Schiffler (R)
▌2. Jennings Randolph (D)
▌3. Andrew Edmiston Jr. (D)
▌4. George W. Johnson (D)
▌5. John Kee (D)
▌6. Joe L. Smith (D)

==== Wisconsin ====
▌1. Stephen Bolles (R)
▌2. Charles Hawks Jr. (R)
▌3. Harry W. Griswold (R), until July 4, 1939
▌4. John C. Schafer (R)
▌5. Lewis D. Thill (R)
▌6. Frank Bateman Keefe (R)
▌7. Reid F. Murray (R)
▌8. Joshua L. Johns (R)
▌9. Merlin Hull (P)
▌10. Bernard J. Gehrmann (P)

==== Wyoming ====
▌At-large. Frank O. Horton (R)

==== Non-voting members ====
▌Alaska Territory. Anthony J. Dimond (D)
▌Hawaii Territory. Samuel Wilder King (R)
▌Philippines. Joaquín Miguel Elizalde (I)
▌Puerto Rico. Santiago Iglesias (Coalitionist), until December 5, 1939

▌Bolívar Pagán (Resident Commissioner) (Soc.), from December 26, 1939

== Changes in membership ==
The count below reflects changes from the beginning of this Congress.

=== Senate ===
Senate changes
State (class)	Vacated by	Reason for change	Successor	Date of successor's formal installation (Note: When seated or oath administered, not necessarily when service began.)
Illinois (2)	J. Hamilton Lewis (D)	Died April 9, 1939. Successor appointed April 14, 1939, to continue the term.	James M. Slattery (D)	April 14, 1939
Kentucky (2)	M. M. Logan (D)	Died October 3, 1939. Successor appointed October 10, 1939, to continue the term. Successor elected November 5, 1940, to finish the term.	Happy Chandler (D)	October 10, 1939
Idaho (2)	William E. Borah (R)	Died January 19, 1940. Successor appointed January 27, 1940, to continue the term. Successor elected November 5, 1940, to finish the term.	John Thomas (R)	January 27, 1940
Vermont (3)	Ernest W. Gibson (R)	Died June 20, 1940. Successor appointed June 24, 1940, to continue the term.	Ernest W. Gibson Jr. (R)	June 24, 1940
Minnesota (2)	Ernest Lundeen (FL)	Died August 31, 1940. Successor appointed October 14, 1940, to continue the term. Successor lost election to finish the term.	Joseph H. Ball (R)	October 14, 1940
Nevada (1)	Key Pittman (D)	Died November 10, 1940. Successor appointed November 27, 1940, to continue finish the term, also appointed to serve in the next term.	Berkeley L. Bunker (D)	November 27, 1940
Illinois (2)	James M. Slattery (D)	Interim appointee lost election November 21, 1940, to finish the term.	Charles W. Brooks (R)	November 22, 1940
Washington (1)	Lewis B. Schwellenbach (D)	Resigned December 16, 1940, to become judge of the U.S. District Court for the Eastern District of Washington. Successor appointed December 19, 1940, to finish the term.	Monrad Wallgren (D)	December 19, 1940

=== House of Representatives ===
House changes
District	Vacated by	Reason for change	Successor	Date of successor's formal installation
Maryland 5th	Vacant	Rep. Stephen W. Gambrill died in previous Congress	Lansdale Sasscer (D)	February 3, 1939
Arkansas 4th	William B. Cravens (D)	Died January 13, 1939	William F. Cravens (D)	September 12, 1939
Pennsylvania 4th	J. Burrwood Daly (D)	Died March 12, 1939	John E. Sheridan (D)	November 7, 1939
Tennessee 6th	Clarence W. Turner (D)	Died March 23, 1939	W. Wirt Courtney (D)	May 11, 1939
Maryland 1st	Thomas A. Goldsborough (D)	Resigned April 5, 1939, after being appointed associate justice of the District Court of the United States for the District of Columbia	David J. Ward (D)	June 8, 1939
New York 34th	Bert Lord (R)	Died May 24, 1939	Edwin A. Hall (R)	November 7, 1939
Georgia 4th	Emmett M. Owen (D)	Died June 21, 1939	A. Sidney Camp (D)	August 1, 1939
Wisconsin 3rd	Harry W. Griswold (R)	Died July 4, 1939	Vacant until the next Congress	
Tennessee 3rd	Sam D. McReynolds (D)	Died July 11, 1939	Estes Kefauver (D)	September 13, 1939
California 18th	Thomas M. Eaton (R)	Died September 16, 1939	Vacant until the next Congress	
South Carolina 1st	Thomas S. McMillan (D)	Died September 29, 1939	Clara G. McMillan (D)	November 7, 1939
Ohio 22nd	Chester C. Bolton (R)	Died October 29, 1939	Frances P. Bolton (R)	February 27, 1940
Tennessee 2nd	J. Will Taylor (R)	Died November 14, 1939	John Jennings Jr. (R)	December 30, 1939
Puerto Rico at-large	Santiago Iglesias (Coalitionist)	Died December 5, 1939	Bolívar Pagán (Socialist)	December 26, 1939
Colorado 3rd	John A. Martin (D)	Died December 23, 1939	William E. Burney (D)	November 5, 1940
Michigan 5th	Carl E. Mapes (R)	Died December 12, 1939	Bartel J. Jonkman (R)	February 19, 1940
New York 14th	William I. Sirovich (D)	Died December 17, 1939	Morris M. Edelstein (D)	February 6, 1940
Ohio 17th	William A. Ashbrook (D)	Died January 1, 1940	J. Harry McGregor (R)	February 27, 1940
Nebraska 1st	George H. Heinke (R)	Died January 2, 1940	John H. Sweet (R)	April 19, 1940
Tennessee 9th	Clift Chandler (D)	Resigned January 2, 1940, after being elected Mayor of Memphis	Clifford Davis (D)	February 15, 1940
New York 31st	Wallace E. Pierce (R)	Died January 3, 1940	Clarence E. Kilburn (R)	February 13, 1940
New York 22nd	Edward W. Curley (D)	Died January 6, 1940	Walter A. Lynch (D)	February 20, 1940
Iowa 6th	Cassius C. Dowell (R)	Died February 4, 1940	Robert K. Goodwin (R)	March 5, 1940
Maine 2nd	Clyde Smith (R)	Died April 8, 1940	Margaret Chase Smith (R)	June 3, 1940
Georgia 8th	W. Benjamin Gibbs (D)	Died August 7, 1940	Florence Reville Gibbs (D)	October 1, 1940
New Jersey 8th	George N. Seger (R)	Died August 26, 1940	Vacant until the next Congress	
Alabama 7th	William B. Bankhead (D)	Died September 15, 1940	Zadoc L. Weatherford (D)	November 5, 1940
North Carolina 1st	Lindsay C. Warren (D)	Resigned October 31, 1940, after being appointed Comptroller General of the United States	Herbert C. Bonner (D)	November 5, 1940
Texas 18th	John Marvin Jones (D)	Resigned November 20, 1940, to become judge of the United States Court of Claims	Vacant until the next Congress	
Louisiana 2nd	Paul H. Maloney (D)	Resigned December 15, 1940, to become Collector of Internal Revenue for New Orleans District	Vacant until the next Congress	
Washington 2nd	Monrad Wallgren (D)	Resigned December 19, 1940, after being appointed to the US Senate having already been elected.	Vacant until the next Congress	
Missouri 11th	Thomas C. Hennings Jr. (D)	Resigned December 31, 1940, to become candidate for Circuit attorney of St. Louis	Vacant until the next Congress	

== Committees ==
Lists of committees and their party leaders for members of the House and Senate committees can be found through the Official Congressional Directory at the bottom of this article. The directory after the pages of terms of service lists committees of the Senate, House (Standing with Subcommittees, Select and Special) and Joint and, after that, House/Senate committee assignments. On the committees section of the House and Senate in the Official Congressional Directory, the committee's members on the first row on the left side shows the chairman of the committee and on the right side shows the ranking member of the committee.

=== Senate ===
- Agriculture and Forestry (Chairman: Ellison D. Smith; Ranking Member: George W. Norris)
- Aquatic Life (Special)
- Appropriations (Chairman: Carter Glass; Ranking Member: Frederick Hale)
- Audit and Control the Contingent Expenses of the Senate (Chairman: James F. Byrnes; Ranking Member: John G. Townsend Jr.)
- Banking and Currency (Chairman: Robert F. Wagner; Ranking Member: John G. Townsend Jr.)
- Campaign Expenditures Investigation (Special) (Chairman: Guy M. Gillette)
- Civil Service (Chairman: William J. Bulow; Ranking Member: Wallace H. White Jr.)
- Civil Service Laws (Special)
- Civil Service System (Special)
- Claims (Chairman: Edward R. Burke; Ranking Member: Arthur Capper)
- Commerce (Chairman: Josiah W. Bailey; Ranking Member: Charles L. McNary)
- Court Reorganization and Judicial Procedure (Special)
- District of Columbia (Chairman: William H. King; Ranking Member: Arthur Capper)
- Education and Labor (Chairman: Elbert D. Thomas; Ranking Member: William E. Borah then Robert M. La Follette Jr.)
  - Investigation Violations of Free Speech and the Rights of Labor
- Enrolled Bills (Chairman: Hattie W. Caraway; Ranking Member: Arthur H. Vandenberg)
- Expenditures in Executive Departments (Chairman: Frederick Van Nuys; Ranking Member: James J. Davis)
- Finance (Chairman: Pat Harrison; Ranking Member: Robert M. La Follette Jr.)
- Foreign Relations (Chairman: Key Pittman; Ranking Member: William E. Borah then Hiram W. Johnson)
- Government Organization (Select)
- Immigration (Chairman: Richard B. Russell; Ranking Member: Hiram W. Johnson)
- Indian Affairs (Chairman: Elmer Thomas; Ranking Member: Lynn J. Frazier)
- Interoceanic Canals (Chairman: Bennett Champ Clark; Ranking Member: Styles Bridges)
- Interstate Commerce (Chairman: Burton K. Wheeler; Ranking Member: Wallace H. White Jr.)
- Irrigation and Reclamation (Chairman: John H. Bankhead II; Ranking Member: Charles L. McNary)
- Judiciary (Chairman: Henry F. Ashurst; Ranking Member: William E. Borah then George W. Norris)
- Library (Chairman: Alben W. Barkley; Ranking Member: Ernest W. Gibson then Charles L. McNary)
- Manufactures (Chairman: John H. Overton; Ranking Member: Robert M. La Follette Jr.)
- Military Affairs (Chairman: Morris Sheppard; Ranking Member: Warren R. Austin)
- Mines and Mining (Chairman: Joseph F. Guffey; Ranking Member: Lynn J. Frazier)
- Naval Affairs (Chairman: David I. Walsh; Ranking Member: Frederick Hale)
- Patents (Chairman: Homer T. Bone; Ranking Member: George W. Norris)
- Pensions (Chairman: Sherman Minton; Ranking Member: Lynn J. Frazier)
- Post Office and Post Roads (Chairman: Kenneth McKellar; Ranking Member: Lynn J. Frazier)
- Printing (Chairman: Carl Hayden; Ranking Member: Arthur H. Vandenberg)
- Privileges and Elections (Chairman: Walter F. George; Ranking Member: Warren R. Austin)
- Public Buildings and Grounds (Chairman: Tom Connally; Ranking Member: Frederick Hale)
- Public Lands and Surveys (Chairman: Alva B. Adams; Ranking Member: Gerald P. Nye)
- Rules (Chairman: Matthew M. Neely; Ranking Member: Frederick Hale)
- Senatorial Campaign Expenditures (Special)
- Small Business Enterprises (Special)
- Taxation of Government Securities and Salaries (Special)
- Territories and Insular Affairs (Chairman: Millard E. Tydings; Ranking Member: Gerald P. Nye)
- Unemployment and Relief (Select)
- Whole
- Wildlife Resources (Special) (Chairman: Vacant; Ranking Member: Vacant)
- Wool Production (Special) (Chairman: Alva B. Adams)

=== House of Representatives ===
- Accounts (Chairman: Lindsay C. Warren; Ranking Member: James Wolfenden)
- Agriculture (Chairman: J. Marvin Jones; Ranking Member: Clifford R. Hope)
- Anthracite Emergency Program (Special)
- Appropriations (Chairman: Edward T. Taylor; Ranking Member: John Taber)
- Banking and Currency (Chairman: Henry B. Steagall; Ranking Member: Jesse P. Wolcott)
- Census (Chairman: Matthew A. Dunn; Ranking Member: J. Roland Kinzer)
- Civil Service (Chairman: Robert Ramspeck; Ranking Member: Edith Nourse Rogers)
- Claims (Chairman: Ambrose J. Kennedy; Ranking Member: Ulysses S. Guyer)
- Coinage, Weights and Measures (Chairman: Andrew Somers; Ranking Member: Clarence E. Hancock)
- Conservation of Wildlife Resources (Select) (Chairman: A. Willis Robertson)
- Disposition of Executive Papers (Chairman: Alfred J. Elliott; Ranking Member: Bertrand W. Gearhart)
- District of Columbia (Chairman: Jennings Randolph; Ranking Member: Everett Dirksen)
- Education (Chairman: William H. Larrabee; Ranking Member: George A. Dondero)
- Election of the President, Vice President and Representatives in Congress (Chairman: Caroline O'Day; Ranking Member: George H. Tinkham)
- Elections No.#1 (Chairman: Milton West; Ranking Member: Clarence E. Hancock)
- Elections No.#2 (Chairman: Joseph A. Gavagan; Ranking Member: Ulysses S. Guyer)
- Elections No.#3 (Chairman: John H. Kerr; Ranking Member: Charles L. Gifford)
- Enrolled Bills (Chairman: Claude Parsons; Ranking Member: Charles Aubrey Eaton)
- Expenditures in the Executive Departments (Chairman: John J. Cochran; Ranking Member: Charles L. Gifford)
- Flood Control (Chairman: William M. Whittington; Ranking Member: Harry Lane Englebright)
- Foreign Affairs (Chairman: Sol Bloom; Ranking Member: Hamilton Fish III)
- Government Organization (Select) (Chairman: N/A)
- Immigration and Naturalization (Chairman: Samuel Dickstein; Ranking Member: J. Will Taylor)
- Indian Affairs (Chairman: Will Rogers; Ranking Member: Fred C. Gilchrist)
- Insular Affairs (Chairman: Leo Kocialkowski; Ranking Member: Richard J. Welch)
- Interstate and Foreign Commerce (Chairman: Clarence F. Lea; Ranking Member: Carl E. Mapes)
- Invalid Pensions (Chairman: John Lesinski; Ranking Member: Owen Brewster)
- Investigate Interstate Migration of Destitute Citizens (Select) (Chairman: N/A)
- Investigate the National Labor Relations Board (Special) (Chairman: N/A)
- Irrigation and Reclamation (Chairman: Compton I. White; Ranking Member: Fred A. Hartley Jr.)
- Judiciary (Chairman: Hatton W. Sumners; Ranking Member: Ulysses S. Guyer)
- Labor (Chairman: Mary Teresa Norton; Ranking Member: Richard J. Welch)
- Library (Chairman: Kent E. Keller; Ranking Member: Allen T. Treadway)
- Memorials (Chairman: Alfred Bulwinkle; Ranking Member: Frank Crowther)
- Merchant Marine and Fisheries (Chairman: S. Otis Bland; Ranking Member: Richard J. Welch)
- Military Affairs (Chairman: Andrew J. May; Ranking Member: Walter G. Andrews)
- Mines and Mining (Chairman: Joe L. Smith; Ranking Member: Harry Lane Englebright)
- Naval Affairs (Chairman: Carl Vinson; Ranking Member: Melvin J. Maas)
- Patents (Chairman: Charles Kramer; Ranking Member: Fred A. Hartley Jr.)
- Pensions (Chairman: N/A; Ranking Member: N/A)
- Post Office and Post Roads (Chairman: N/A; Ranking Member: Fred A. Hartley Jr.)
- Printing (Chairman: N/A; Ranking Member: Robert F. Rich)
- Public Buildings and Grounds (Chairman: Fritz G. Lanham; Ranking Member: J. Will Taylor)
- Public Lands (Chairman: Rene L. DeRouen; Ranking Member: Harry Lane Englebright)
- Revision of Laws (Chairman: Eugene J. Keogh; Ranking Member: Jesse P. Wolcott)
- Rivers and Harbors (Chairman: Joseph J. Mansfield; Ranking Member: George N. Seger)
- Roads (Chairman: Wilburn Cartwright; Ranking Member: Jesse P. Wolcott)
- Rules (Chairman: Adolph J. Sabath; Ranking Member: Joseph W. Martin Jr.)
- Standards of Official Conduct
- Territories (Chairman: Robert A. Green; Ranking Member: Harry Lane Englebright)
- War Claims (Chairman: Reuben T. Wood; Ranking Member: Clare E. Hoffman)
- Ways and Means (Chairman: Robert L. Doughton; Ranking Member: Allen T. Treadway)
- World War Veterans' Legislation (Chairman: John E. Rankin; Ranking Member: Edith Nourse Rogers)
- Whole

=== Joint committees ===
- Conditions of Indian Tribes (Special)
- Disposition of (Useless) Executive Papers
- Eradication of the Mediterranean Fruit Fly
- Forestry
- The Library (Chairman: Sen. Alben W. Barkley)
- To Investigate Phosphate Resource of the United States (Chairman: N/A; Vice Chairman: Rep. J. Hardin Peterson)
- Printing (Chairman: N/A; Vice Chairman: Sen. Carl Hayden)
- Taxation (Chairman: Rep. Robert L. Doughton; Vice Chairman: Sen. Pat Harrison)
- Tennessee Valley Authority (Chairman: Sen. A. Victor Donahey; Vice Chairman: N/A)

== Caucuses ==
- Democratic (House)
- Democratic (Senate)

== Employees ==
=== Legislative branch agency directors ===
- Architect of the Capitol: David Lynn
- Attending Physician of the United States Congress: George Calver
- Comptroller General of the United States: vacant, until April 11, 1939
  - Fred H. Brown, April 11, 1939 - June 19, 1940
  - vacant, June 19, 1940 - November 1, 1940
  - Lindsay C. Warren, from November 1, 1940
- Librarian of Congress: Herbert Putnam, until 1939
  - Archibald MacLeish, from 1939
- Public Printer of the United States: Augustus E. Giegengack

=== Senate ===
- Chaplain: ZeBarney Thorne Phillips (Episcopal)
- Parliamentarian: Charles Watkins
- Secretary for the Majority: Leslie Biffle
- Secretary for the Minority: Carl A. Loeffler
- Secretary: Edwin A. Halsey
- Librarian: Ruskin McArdle
- Sergeant at Arms: Chesley W. Jurney

=== House of Representatives ===
- Chaplain: James Shera Montgomery (Methodist)
- Clerk: South Trimble
- Parliamentarian: Lewis Deschler
- Postmaster: Finis E. Scott
- Doorkeeper: Joseph J. Sinnott
- Reading Clerks: Roger M. Calloway (D) and Alney E. Chaffee (R)
- Sergeant at Arms: Kenneth Romney

== In popular culture ==
- It appears in Mr. Smith Goes to Washington.

== See also ==
- 1938 United States elections (elections leading to this Congress)
  - 1938 United States Senate elections
  - 1938 United States House of Representatives elections
- 1940 United States elections (elections during this Congress, leading to the next Congress)
  - 1940 United States presidential election
  - 1940 United States Senate elections
  - 1940 United States House of Representatives elections
