= Florence Reville Gibbs =

American politician (1890–1964)

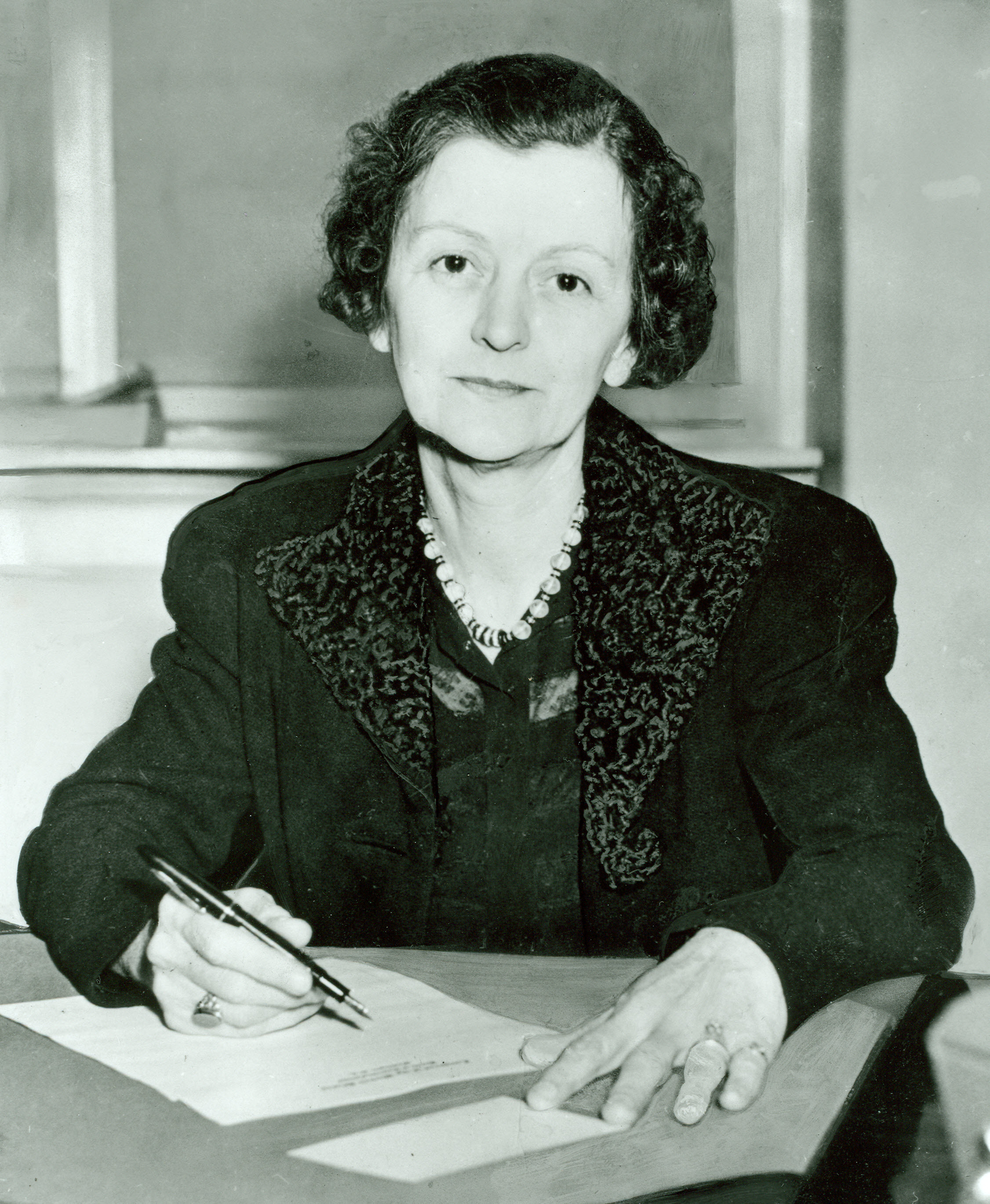

Member of the U.S. House of Representatives from Georgia's 8th district
- In office October 3, 1940 – January 3, 1941
- Preceded by: W. Benjamin Gibbs
- Succeeded by: John S. Gibson

Personal details
- Born: April 4, 1890 Thomson, Georgia, U.S.
- Died: August 19, 1964 (aged 74) Jesup, Georgia, U.S.
- Party: Democratic
- Spouse: Willis Benjamin Gibbs
- Education: Brenau College

Florence Gibbs (née Reville; April 4, 1890 – August 19, 1964) was a Democratic congresswoman. Elected in special election to replace her deceased husband, she became the first woman to represent Georgia in the United States House of Representatives, serving for three months from October 3, 1940, to January 3, 1941.

== Early life ==
Florence Reville was born April 4, 1890, in Thomson, McDuffie County, Georgia. She was the oldest child of Sallie Printup Reville and Thomas Porter Reville. She grew up there, attending public schools, and then graduated from Brenau College in Gainesville, Georgia. She married Willis Benjamin Gibbs, a Georgia attorney and politician, and together they had two children.

== Congress ==
In 1938, W. Benjamin Gibbs was elected as a Democrat to represent Georgia's Eighth congressional district in the 76th United States Congress. He took his seat on January 3, 1939, and served until his death in 1940. Florence Gibbs was elected on October 3, 1940, as a Democrat in the special election to fill the vacant seat left by her husband's death; she was sworn into office on October 3, 1940. She did not run in the general election to represent the district in the 77th United States Congress, and she left office January 3, 1941.

== Later life ==
After leaving Congress, Florence Gibbs retired from public life and resided in Jesup, Georgia, until her death there on August 19, 1964.

== See also ==
- Women in the United States House of Representatives

U.S. House of Representatives
Preceded by W. Benjamin Gibbs	Member of the U.S. House of Representatives from Georgia's 8th congressional district October 1, 1940 – January 3, 1941	Succeeded by John S. Gibson
