= 1994 United States House of Representatives elections in Pennsylvania =

- November 8, 1994

All 21 Pennsylvania seats to the United States House of Representatives
	Majority party	Minority party
Party	Democratic	Republican
Last election	11	10
Seats won	11	10
Seat change	Steady	Steady
Popular vote	1,491,859	1,830,779
Percentage	44.25%	54.30%
Swing	▼2.68%	▲3.16%

Democratic hold Democratic gain
Republican hold Republican gain
Democratic
40–50%
50–60%
60–70%
70–80%
80–90%
Republican
40–50%
50–60%
60–70%
70–80%
>90%

The 1994 United States House of Representatives elections in Pennsylvania were held on November 8, 1994, to elect the twenty-one members of Pennsylvania's delegation to the United States House of Representatives. The elections coincided with other elections to the House of Representatives, elections to the United States Senate, and various state and local elections. Primary elections were held on May 10, 1994.

== Overview ==
United States House of Representatives elections in Pennsylvania, 1994
Party	Votes	Percentage	Seats before	Seats after	+/–
Democratic	1,491,859	44.25%	11	11	0
Republican	1,803,779	54.30%	10	10	0
Libertarian	20,304	0.60%	0	0	0
Patriot	11,053	0.33%	0	0	0
Independent	6,588	0.20%	0	0	0
Cash for Congress	4,191	0.12%	0	0	0
Citizens with Szabo	3,278	0.10%	0	0	0
Workers League	1,819	0.05%	0	0	0
Write-in	1,701	0.05%	0	0	0
Totals	3,371,572	100.00%	21	21	–

== Match-up summary ==
District	Democratic		Republican		Others		Total		Result
District	Votes	%	Votes	%	Votes	%	Votes	%	Result
District 1	99,669	81.52%	22,595	18.48%	0	0.00%	122,264	100.00%	Democratic hold
District 2	120,553	85.88%	19,824	14.12%	0	0.00%	140,377	100.00%	Democratic hold
District 3	92,702	62.67%	55,209	37.33%	0	0.00%	147,911	100.00%	Democratic hold
District 4	119,115	64.17%	66,509	35.83%	6	0.00%	185,630	100.00%	Democratic hold
District 5	0	0.00%	145,335	99.93%	96	0.07%	145,431	100.00%	Republican hold
District 6	90,023	56.75%	68,610	43.25%	0	0.00%	158,633	100.00%	Democratic hold
District 7	59,845	30.33%	137,480	69.67%	0	0.00%	197,325	100.00%	Republican hold
District 8	44,559	26.65%	110,499	66.10%	12,116	7.25%	167,174	100.00%	Republican hold
District 9	0	0.00%	146,688	99.65%	515	0.35%	147,203	100.00%	Republican hold
District 10	50,635	31.09%	106,992	65.68%	5,263	3.23%	162,890	100.00%	Republican hold
District 11	101,966	66.52%	51,295	33.47%	16	0.01%	153,277	100.00%	Democratic hold
District 12	117,825	68.90%	53,147	31.08%	33	0.02%	171,005	100.00%	Democratic hold
District 13	88,073	45.21%	96,254	49.41%	10,461	5.37%	194,788	100.00%	Republican gain
District 14	105,310	64.13%	53,221	32.41%	5,679	3.46%	164,210	100.00%	Democratic hold
District 15	72,073	47.76%	71,602	47.45%	7,234	4.79%	150,909	100.00%	Democratic hold
District 16	47,680	30.28%	109,759	69.71%	16	0.01%	157,455	100.00%	Republican hold
District 17	0	0.00%	133,788	99.86%	187	0.14%	133,975	100.00%	Republican hold
District 18	101,784	54.80%	83,881	45.16%	85	0.05%	185,750	100.00%	Democratic gain
District 19	0	0.00%	124,496	99.50%	621	0.50%	125,117	100.00%	Republican hold
District 20	95,251	53.09%	84,156	46.90%	12	0.01%	179,419	100.00%	Democratic hold
District 21	84,796	46.89%	89,439	49.46%	6,594	3.65%	180,829	100.00%	Republican hold
Total	1,491,859	44.25%	1,830,779	54.30%	48,934	1.45%	3,371,572	100.00%	

Popular vote
Republican	54.30%
Democratic	44.25%
Other	1.45%

House seats
Democratic	52.38%
Republican	47.62%

== District 1 ==
1994 Pennsylvania's 1st congressional district election
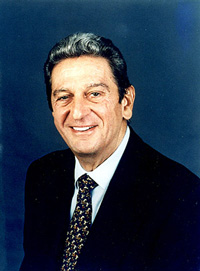

Nominee	Thomas M. Foglietta	Roger F. Gordon
Party	Democratic	Republican
Popular vote	99,669	22,595
Percentage	81.52%	18.48%
U.S. Representative before election
Thomas M. Foglietta
Democratic
Elected U.S. Representative
Thomas M. Foglietta
Democratic

=== Democratic primary ===
==== Candidates ====
===== Nominee =====
- Thomas M. Foglietta, incumbent U.S. representative

==== Eliminated in primary ====
- Harvey Clark

==== Primary results ====
Democratic primary results
Party	Candidate	Votes	%
Democratic	Thomas M. Foglietta (incumbent)	40,830	68.98
Democratic	Harvey Clark	18,364	31.02
Total votes		59,194	100.00

=== Republican primary ===
==== Candidates ====
===== Nominee =====
- Roger F. Gordon

==== Primary results ====
Republican primary results
Party	Candidate	Votes	%
Republican	Roger F. Gordon	9,515	100.00
Total votes		9,515	100.00

=== General election ===
Pennsylvania's 1st congressional district, 1994
Party	Candidate	Votes	%
Democratic	Thomas M. Foglietta (incumbent)	99,669	81.52
Republican	Roger F. Gordon	22,595	18.48
Total votes		122,264	100.00
Democratic hold			

==== By county (Note: Vote totals summed from the precinct data file published by the Pennsylvania Department of State do not match the results officially published by the U.S. House of Representatives.) ====
County	Thomas M. Foglietta Democratic		Roger F. Gordon Republican		Margin		Total votes cast
County	#	%	#	%	#	%	Total votes cast
Delaware	9,145	53.03%	8,099	46.97%	1,046	6.06%	17,244
Philadelphia	90,312	86.14%	14,530	13.86%	75,782	72.28%	104,842
Totals	99,457	81.46%	22,629	18.54%	76,828	62.93%	122,086

== District 2 ==
1994 Pennsylvania's 2nd congressional district election
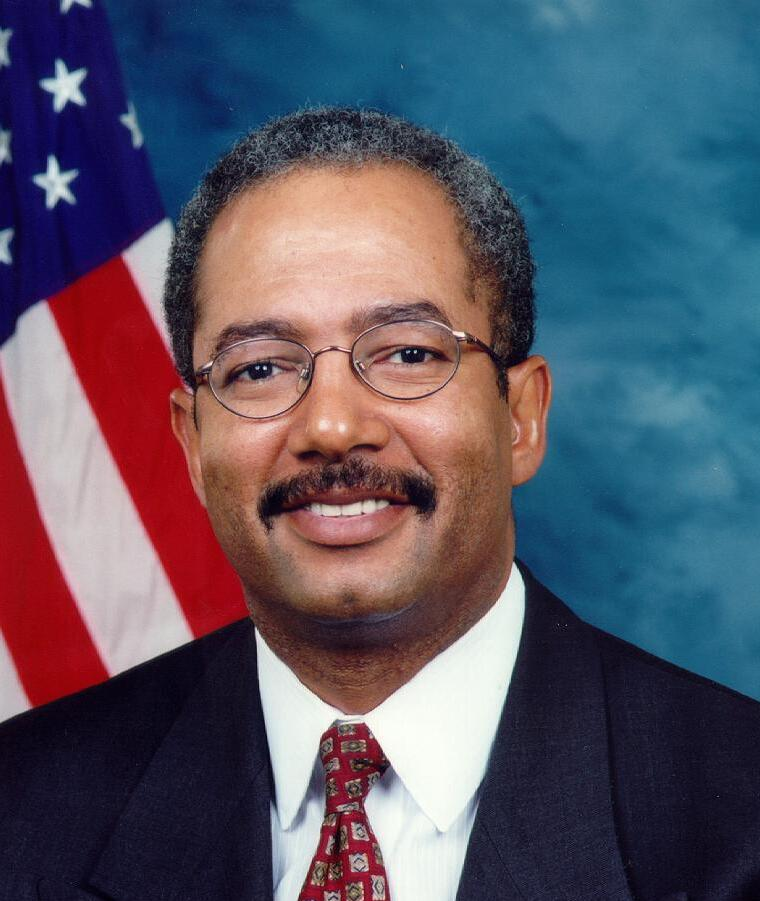

Nominee	Chaka Fattah	Lawrence Watson
Party	Democratic	Republican
Popular vote	120,553	19,824
Percentage	85.88%	14.12%
U.S. Representative before election
Lucien Blackwell
Democratic
Elected U.S. Representative
Chaka Fattah
Democratic

Incumbent U.S. Representative Lucien Blackwell lost renomination to State Senator Chaka Fattah.

=== Democratic primary ===
==== Candidates ====
===== Nominee =====
- Chaka Fattah, member of the Pennsylvania State Senate (1989–present) and Pennsylvania House of Representatives (1983–1988)

===== Eliminated in primary =====
- Lucien Blackwell, incumbent U.S. representative

==== Primary results ====
Democratic primary results
Party	Candidate	Votes	%
Democratic	Chaka Fattah	55,103	58.04
Democratic	Lucien Blackwell (incumbent)	39,836	41.96
Total votes		94,939	100.00

=== Republican primary ===
==== Candidates ====
===== Nominee =====
- Lawrence R. Watson

==== Primary results ====
Republican primary results
Party	Candidate	Votes	%
Republican	Lawrence R. Watson	9,104	100.00
Total votes		9,104	100.00

=== General election ===
Pennsylvania's 2nd congressional district, 1994
Party	Candidate	Votes	%
Democratic	Chaka Fattah	120,553	85.88
Republican	Lawrence R. Watson	19,824	14.12
Total votes		140,377	100.00
Democratic hold			

==== By county ====
County	Chaka Fattah Democratic		Lawrence Watson Republican		Margin		Total votes cast
County	#	%	#	%	#	%	Total votes cast
Delaware	5,083	57.67%	3,731	42.33%	1,352	15.34%	8,814
Philadelphia	114,927	87.80%	15,964	12.20%	98,963	75.60%	130,891
Totals	120,010	85.90%	19,695	14.10%	100,315	71.80%	139,705

== District 3 ==
1994 Pennsylvania's 3rd congressional district election
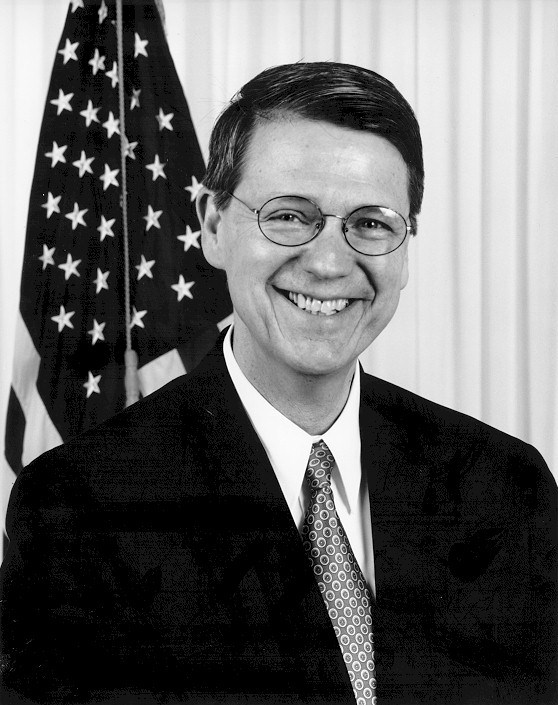

Nominee	Robert Borski	James Hasher
Party	Democratic	Republican
Popular vote	92,702	55,209
Percentage	62.67%	37.33%
U.S. Representative before election
Robert Borski
Democratic
Elected U.S. Representative
Robert Borski
Democratic

=== Democratic primary ===
==== Candidates ====
===== Nominee =====
- Robert Borski, incumbent U.S. representative

===== Eliminated in primary =====
- Dennis Jerome Gesker
- John R. Kates

==== Primary results ====
Democratic primary results
Party	Candidate	Votes	%
Democratic	Robert Borski (incumbent)	44,231	86.48
Democratic	John R. Kates	4,236	8.28
Democratic	Dennis Jerome Gesker	2,676	5.23
Total votes		51,143	100.00

=== Republican primary ===
==== Candidates ====
===== Nominee =====
- James C. Hasher

==== Primary results ====
Republican primary results
Party	Candidate	Votes	%
Republican	James C. Hasher	27,038	100.00
Total votes		27,038	100.00

=== General election ===
Pennsylvania's 3rd congressional district, 1994
Party	Candidate	Votes	%
Democratic	Robert Borski (incumbent)	92,702	62.67
Republican	James C. Hasher	55,209	37.33
Total votes		147,911	100.00
Democratic hold			

==== By county ====
County	Robert Borski Democratic		James Hasher Republican		Margin		Total votes cast
County	#	%	#	%	#	%	Total votes cast
Philadelphia	92,702	62.67%	55,209	37.33%	37,493	25.35%	147,911
Totals	92,702	62.67%	55,209	37.33%	37,493	25.35%	147,911

== District 4 ==
1994 Pennsylvania's 4th congressional district election
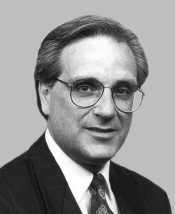

Nominee	Ron Klink	Ed Peglow
Party	Democratic	Republican
Popular vote	119,115	66,509
Percentage	64.17%	35.83%
U.S. Representative before election
Ron Klink
Democratic
Elected U.S. Representative
Ron Klink
Democratic

=== Democratic primary ===
==== Candidates ====
===== Nominee =====
- Ron Klink, incumbent U.S. representative

==== Primary results ====
Democratic primary results
Party	Candidate	Votes	%
Democratic	Ron Klink (incumbent)	62,821	100.00
Total votes		62,821	100.00

=== Republican primary ===
==== Candidates ====
===== Nominee =====
- Ed Peglow

==== Primary results ====
Republican primary results
Party	Candidate	Votes	%
Republican	Ed Peglow	29,640	100.00
Total votes		29,640	100.00

=== General election ===
Pennsylvania's 4th congressional district, 1994
Party	Candidate	Votes	%
Democratic	Ron Klink (incumbent)	119,115	64.17
Republican	Ed Peglow	66,509	35.83
Write-in		6	0.00
Total votes		185,630	100.00
Democratic hold			

==== By county ====
County	Ron Klink Democratic		Ed Peglow Republican		Write-in		Margin		Total votes cast
County	#	%	#	%	#	%	#	%	Total votes cast
Allegheny	16,919	63.14%	9,875	36.86%	0	0.00%	7,044	26.28%	26,794
Beaver	39,924	63.61%	22,759	36.26%	81	0.13%	17,165	27.35%	62,764
Butler	7,993	50.97%	7,690	49.03%	0	0.00%	303	1.94%	15,683
Lawrence	21,346	68.63%	9,759	31.37%	0	0.00%	11,587	37.26%	31,105
Westmoreland	32,901	66.73%	16,402	33.27%	1	0.00%	16,499	33.46%	49,304
Totals	119,083	64.14%	66,485	35.81%	82	0.04%	52,598	28.33%	185,650

== District 5 ==
1994 Pennsylvania's 5th congressional district election
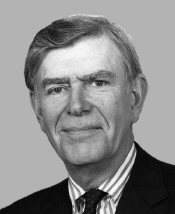
Nominee	William Clinger
Party	Republican
Popular vote	145,335
Percentage	99.93%
U.S. Representative before election
William Clinger
Republican
Elected U.S. Representative
William Clinger
Republican

=== Republican primary ===
==== Candidates ====
===== Nominee =====
- William Clinger, incumbent U.S. representative

===== Eliminated in primary =====
- Larry P. Gourley

==== Primary results ====
Republican primary results
Party	Candidate	Votes	%
Republican	William Clinger (incumbent)	45,621	79.51
Republican	Larry P. Gourley	11,755	20.49
Total votes		57,376	100.00

=== General election ===
Pennsylvania's 5th congressional district, 1994
Party	Candidate	Votes	%
Republican	William Clinger (incumbent)	145,335	99.93
Write-in		96	0.07
Total votes		145,431	100.00
Republican hold			

==== By county ====
County	William Clinger Republican		Write-in		Margin		Total votes cast
County	#	%	#	%	#	%	Total votes cast
Armstrong	179	100.00%	0	0.00%	179	100.00%	179
Cameron	1,872	100.00%	0	0.00%	1,872	100.00%	1,872
Centre	25,982	100.00%	0	0.00%	25,982	100.00%	25,982
Clarion	11,269	100.00%	0	0.00%	11,269	100.00%	11,269
Clearfield	11	100.00%	0	0.00%	11	100.00%	11
Clinton	8,811	100.00%	0	0.00%	8,811	100.00%	8,811
Crawford	6,022	100.00%	0	0.00%	6,022	100.00%	6,022
Elk	10,224	100.00%	0	0.00%	10,224	100.00%	10,224
Forest	1,722	100.00%	0	0.00%	1,722	100.00%	1,722
Jefferson	12,526	100.00%	0	0.00%	12,526	100.00%	12,526
Lycoming	4,315	100.00%	0	0.00%	4,315	100.00%	4,315
McKean	10,168	100.00%	0	0.00%	10,168	100.00%	10,168
Potter	4,946	99.72%	14	0.28%	4,932	99.44%	4,960
Tioga	11,294	99.96%	5	0.04%	11,289	99.92%	11,299
Union	7,311	100.00%	0	0.00%	7,311	100.00%	7,311
Venango	15,296	99.90%	15	0.10%	15,281	99.80%	15,311
Warren	13,387	99.78%	29	0.22%	13,358	99.56%	13,416
Totals	145,335	99.96%	63	0.04%	145,272	99.92%	145,398

== District 6 ==
1994 Pennsylvania's 6th congressional district election
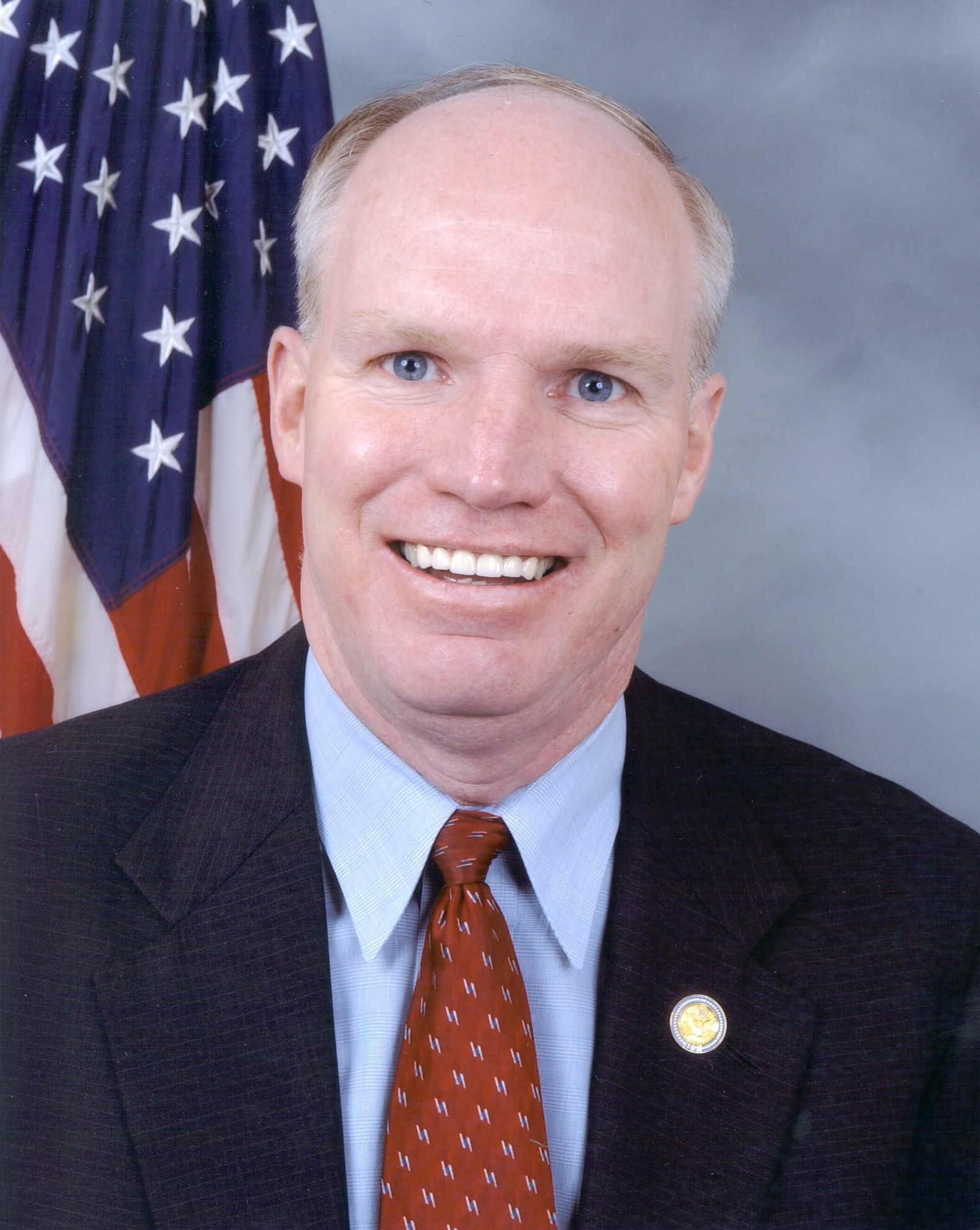

Nominee	Tim Holden	Frederick Levering
Party	Democratic	Republican
Popular vote	90,023	68,610
Percentage	56.75%	43.25%
U.S. Representative before election
Tim Holden
Democratic
Elected U.S. Representative
Tim Holden
Democratic

=== Democratic primary ===
==== Candidates ====
===== Nominee =====
- Tim Holden, incumbent U.S. representative

==== Primary results ====
Democratic primary results
Party	Candidate	Votes	%
Democratic	Tim Holden (incumbent)	29,371	100.00
Total votes		29,371	100.00

=== Republican primary ===
==== Candidates ====
===== Nominee =====
- Frederick Levering (Note: Carl Cronrath withdrew prior to the primary election, though his name remained on the ballot. Levering was selected as the Republican nominee afterwards.)

==== Primary results ====
Republican primary results
Party	Candidate	Votes	%
Republican	Carl Cronrath	30,765	100.00
Total votes		30,765	100.00

=== General election ===
Pennsylvania's 6th congressional district, 1994
Party	Candidate	Votes	%
Democratic	Tim Holden (incumbent)	90,023	56.75
Republican	Frederick Levering	68,610	43.25
Total votes		158,633	100.00
Democratic hold			

==== By county ====
County	Tim Holden Democratic		Frederick Levering Republican		Write-in		Margin		Total votes cast
County	#	%	#	%	#	%	#	%	Total votes cast
Berks	46,967	51.53%	44,133	48.42%	46	0.05%	2,834	3.11%	91,146
Montgomery	2,692	54.78%	2,222	45.22%	0	0.00%	470	9.56%	4,914
Northumberland	5,959	48.89%	6,229	51.11%	0	0.00%	–270	–2.22%	12,188
Schuylkill	34,403	68.23%	16,022	31.77%	0	0.00%	18,381	36.46%	50,425
Totals	90,021	56.73%	68,606	43.24%	46	0.03%	21,415	13.50%	158,673

== District 7 ==
1994 Pennsylvania's 7th congressional district election
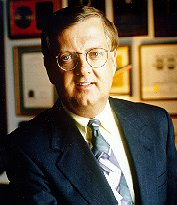

Nominee	Curt Weldon	Sara Nichols
Party	Republican	Democratic
Popular vote	137,480	59,845
Percentage	69.67%	30.33%
U.S. Representative before election
Curt Weldon
Republican
Elected U.S. Representative
Curt Weldon
Republican

=== Democratic primary ===
==== Candidates ====
===== Nominee =====
- Sara Nichols

===== Eliminated in primary =====
- Therese S. Mallory

==== Primary results ====
Democratic primary results
Party	Candidate	Votes	%
Democratic	Sara Nichols	12,257	61.41
Democratic	Therese S. Mallory	7,702	38.59
Total votes		19,959	100.00

=== Republican primary ===
==== Candidates ====
===== Nominee =====
- Curt Weldon, incumbent U.S. representative

===== Eliminated in primary =====
- Deborah LaFountain

==== Primary results ====
Republican primary results
Party	Candidate	Votes	%
Republican	Curt Weldon (incumbent)	59,109	80.30
Republican	Deborah LaFountain	14,497	19.70
Total votes		73,606	100.00

=== General election ===
Pennsylvania's 7th congressional district, 1994
Party	Candidate	Votes	%
Republican	Curt Weldon (incumbent)	137,480	69.67
Democratic	Sara Nichols	59,845	30.33
Total votes		197,325	100.00
Republican hold			

==== By county ====
County	Curt Weldon Republican		Sara Nichols Democratic		Write-in		Margin		Total votes cast
County	#	%	#	%	#	%	#	%	Total votes cast
Chester	22,667	65.13%	12,057	34.64%	78	0.22%	10,610	30.49%	34,802
Delaware	105,460	70.86%	43,360	29.14%	0	0.00%	62,100	41.72%	148,820
Montgomery	6,312	64.15%	3,528	35.85%	0	0.00%	2,784	28.30%	9,840
Totals	134,439	69.49%	58,945	30.47%	78	0.04%	75,494	39.02%	193,462

== District 8 ==
1994 Pennsylvania's 8th congressional district election
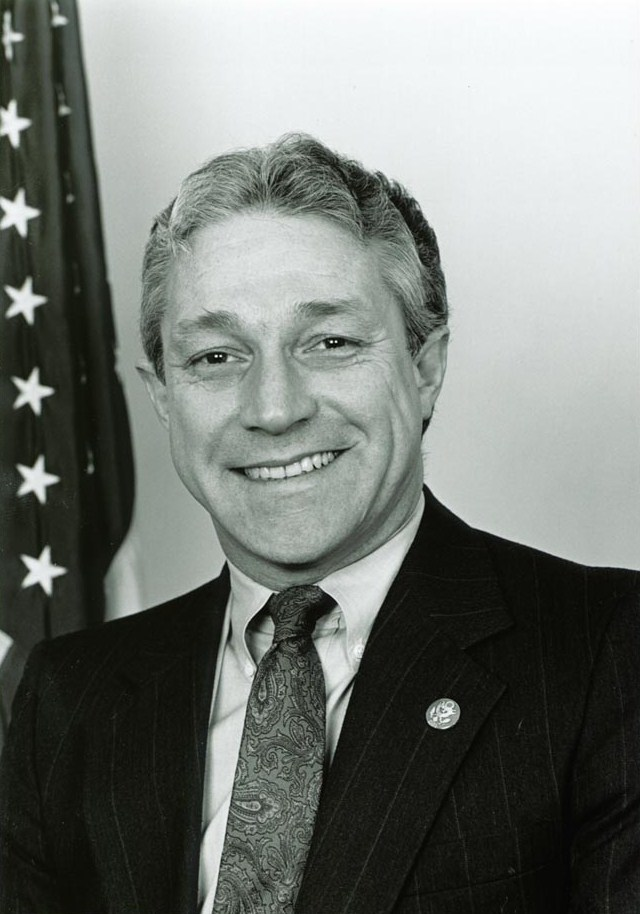

Nominee	Jim Greenwood	John Murray
Party	Republican	Democratic
Popular vote	110,499	44,559
Percentage	66.10%	26.65%
U.S. Representative before election
Jim Greenwood
Republican
Elected U.S. Representative
Jim Greenwood
Republican

=== Democratic primary ===
==== Candidates ====
===== Nominee =====
- John P. Murray

==== Primary results ====
Democratic primary results
Party	Candidate	Votes	%
Democratic	John P. Murray	18,066	100.00
Total votes		18,066	100.00

=== Republican primary ===
==== Candidates ====
===== Nominee =====
- Jim Greenwood, incumbent U.S. representative

==== Primary results ====
Republican primary results
Party	Candidate	Votes	%
Republican	Jim Greenwood (incumbent)	38,436	100.00
Total votes		38,436	100.00

=== General election ===
Pennsylvania's 8th congressional district, 1994
Party	Candidate	Votes	%
Republican	Jim Greenwood (incumbent)	110,499	66.10
Democratic	John P. Murray	44,559	26.65
Libertarian	Jay Russell	7,925	4.74
Cash for Congress	Robert J. Cash	4,191	2.51
Total votes		167,174	100.00
Republican hold			

==== By county ====
County	Jim Greenwood Republican		John Murray Democratic		Jay Russell Libertarian		Robert Cash Independent		Margin		Total votes cast
County	#	%	#	%	#	%	#	%	#	%	Total votes cast
Bucks	105,266	65.82%	42,952	26.86%	7,566	4.73%	4,136	2.59%	62,314	38.96%	159,920
Montgomery	5,233	72.14%	1,607	22.15%	359	4.95%	55	0.76%	3,626	49.99%	7,254
Totals	110,499	66.10%	44,559	26.65%	7,925	4.74%	4,191	2.51%	65,940	39.44%	167,174

== District 9 ==
1994 Pennsylvania's 9th congressional district election
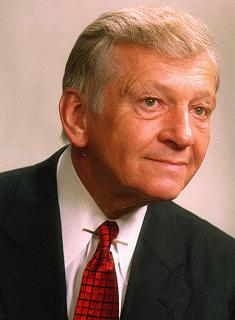
Nominee	Bud Shuster
Party	Republican
Popular vote	146,688
Percentage	99.65%
U.S. Representative before election
Bud Shuster
Republican
Elected U.S. Representative
Bud Shuster
Republican

=== Republican primary ===
==== Candidates ====
===== Nominee =====
- Bud Shuster, incumbent U.S. representative

==== Primary results ====
Republican primary results
Party	Candidate	Votes	%
Republican	Bud Shuster (incumbent)	50,099	100.00
Total votes		50,099	100.00

=== General election ===
Pennsylvania's 9th congressional district, 1994
Party	Candidate	Votes	%
Republican	Bud Shuster (incumbent)	146,688	99.65
Write-in		515	0.35
Total votes		147,203	100.00
Republican hold			

==== By county ====
County	Bud Shuster Republican		Write-in		Margin		Total votes cast
County	#	%	#	%	#	%	Total votes cast
Bedford	14,112	100.00%	0	0.00%	14,112	100.00%	14,112
Blair	31,061	100.00%	0	0.00%	31,061	100.00%	31,061
Centre	4,286	100.00%	0	0.00%	4,286	100.00%	4,286
Clearfield	22,207	99.27%	163	0.73%	22,044	98.54%	22,370
Franklin	30,932	98.25%	552	1.75%	30,380	96.50%	31,484
Fulton	3,720	100.00%	0	0.00%	3,720	100.00%	3,720
Huntingdon	11,360	100.00%	0	0.00%	11,360	100.00%	11,360
Juniata	6,427	100.00%	0	0.00%	6,427	100.00%	6,427
Mifflin	10,475	100.00%	0	0.00%	10,475	100.00%	10,475
Perry	3,221	100.00%	0	0.00%	3,221	100.00%	3,221
Snyder	8,880	100.00%	0	0.00%	8,880	100.00%	8,880
Totals	146,681	99.51%	715	0.49%	145,966	99.03%	147,396

== District 10 ==
1994 Pennsylvania's 10th congressional district election
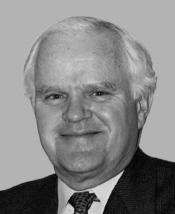

Nominee	Joseph M. McDade	Daniel Schreffler
Party	Republican	Democratic
Popular vote	106,992	50,635
Percentage	65.68%	31.09%
U.S. Representative before election
Joseph M. McDade
Republican
Elected U.S. Representative
Joseph M. McDade
Republican

=== Democratic primary ===
==== Candidates ====
===== Nominee =====
- Daniel J. Schreffler

===== Eliminated in primary =====
- John Karlavage
- Sean P. Lannon

==== Primary results ====
Democratic primary results
Party	Candidate	Votes	%
Democratic	Daniel J. Schreffler	17,467	49.52
Democratic	John Karlavage	10,070	28.55
Democratic	Sean P. Lannon	7,739	21.94
Total votes		35,276	100.00

=== Republican primary ===
==== Candidates ====
===== Nominee =====
- Joseph M. McDade, incumbent U.S. representative

==== Primary results ====
Republican primary results
Party	Candidate	Votes	%
Republican	Joseph M. McDade (incumbent)	42,683	100.00
Total votes		42,683	100.00

=== General election ===
Pennsylvania's 10th congressional district, 1994
Party	Candidate	Votes	%
Republican	Joseph M. McDade (incumbent)	106,992	65.68
Democratic	Daniel J. Schreffler	50,635	31.09
Libertarian	Albert A. Smith	5,196	3.19
Write-in		67	0.04
Total votes		162,890	100.00
Republican hold			

==== By county ====
County	Joseph M. McDade Republican		Daniel Schreffler Democratic		Albert Smith Libertarian		Write-in		Margin		Total votes cast
County	#	%	#	%	#	%	#	%	#	%	Total votes cast
Bradford	11,320	69.02%	4,204	25.63%	866	5.28%	10	0.06%	7,116	43.39%	16,400
Lackawanna	44,651	67.05%	21,126	31.72%	819	1.23%	0	0.00%	23,525	35.33%	66,596
Lycoming	14,906	59.25%	8,910	35.42%	1,301	5.17%	41	0.16%	5,996	23.83%	25,158
Monroe	6,366	57.98%	4,123	37.55%	491	4.47%	0	0.00%	2,243	20.43%	10,980
Pike	5,637	65.02%	2,783	32.10%	249	2.87%	0	0.00%	2,854	32.92%	8,669
Sullivan	1,480	61.92%	801	33.51%	109	4.56%	0	0.00%	679	28.41%	2,390
Susquehanna	8,572	67.53%	3,455	27.22%	666	5.25%	0	0.00%	5,117	40.31%	12,693
Wayne	8,065	69.46%	3,193	27.50%	350	3.01%	3	0.03%	4,872	41.96%	11,611
Wyoming	5,938	71.12%	2,021	24.21%	380	4.55%	10	0.12%	3,917	46.91%	8,349
Totals	106,935	65.67%	50,616	31.08%	5,231	3.21%	64	0.04%	56,319	34.58%	162,846

== District 11 ==
1994 Pennsylvania's 11th congressional district election
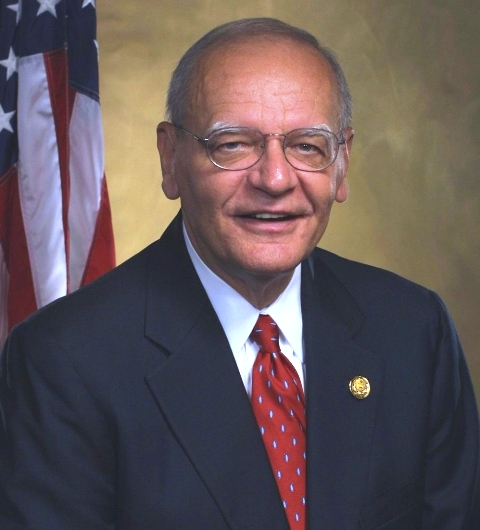

Nominee	Paul Kanjorski	J. Andrew Podolak
Party	Democratic	Republican
Popular vote	101,966	51,295
Percentage	66.52%	33.47%
U.S. Representative before election
Paul Kanjorski
Democratic
Elected U.S. Representative
Paul Kanjorski
Democratic

=== Democratic primary ===
==== Candidates ====
===== Nominee =====
- Paul Kanjorski, incumbent U.S. representative

==== Primary results ====
Democratic primary results
Party	Candidate	Votes	%
Democratic	Paul Kanjorski (incumbent)	43,584	100.00
Total votes		43,584	100.00

=== Republican primary ===
==== Candidates ====
===== Nominee =====
- J. Andrew Podolak

==== Primary results ====
Republican primary results
Party	Candidate	Votes	%
Republican	J. Andrew Podolak	24,067	100.00
Total votes		24,067	100.00

=== General election ===
Pennsylvania's 11th congressional district, 1994
Party	Candidate	Votes	%
Democratic	Paul Kanjorski (incumbent)	101,966	66.52
Republican	J. Andrew Podolak	51,295	33.47
Write-in		16	0.01
Total votes		153,277	100.00
Democratic hold			

==== By county ====
County	Paul Kanjorski Democratic		J. Andrew Podolak Republican		Write-in		Margin		Total votes cast
County	#	%	#	%	#	%	#	%	Total votes cast
Carbon	9,089	61.86%	5,603	38.14%	0	0.00%	3,486	23.72%	14,692
Columbia	10,408	62.94%	6,112	36.96%	16	0.10%	4,296	25.98%	16,536
Luzerne	61,693	69.43%	27,163	30.57%	0	0.00%	34,530	38.86%	88,856
Monroe	7,017	51.38%	6,639	48.62%	0	0.00%	378	2.76%	13,656
Montour	3,181	63.27%	1,847	36.73%	0	0.00%	1,334	26.54%	5,028
Northumberland	10,515	72.99%	3,891	27.01%	0	0.00%	6,624	45.98%	14,406
Totals	101,903	66.53%	51,255	33.46%	16	0.01%	50,648	33.07%	153,174

== District 12 ==
1994 Pennsylvania's 12th congressional district election
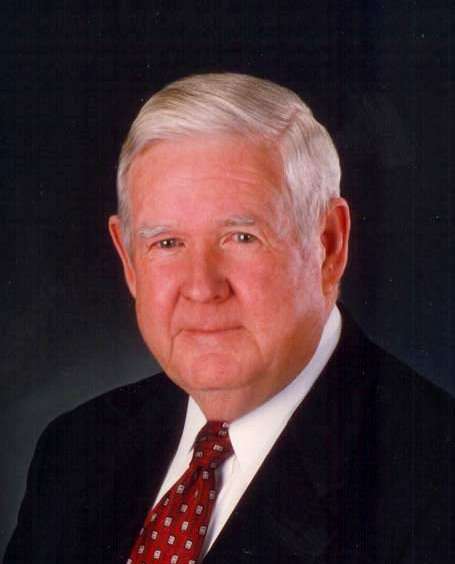

Nominee	John Murtha	Bill Choby
Party	Democratic	Republican
Popular vote	117,825	53,147
Percentage	68.90%	31.08%
U.S. Representative before election
John Murtha
Democratic
Elected U.S. Representative
John Murtha
Democratic

=== Democratic primary ===
==== Candidates ====
===== Nominee =====
- John Murtha, incumbent U.S. representative

==== Primary results ====
Democratic primary results
Party	Candidate	Votes	%
Democratic	John Murtha (incumbent)	54,771	100.00
Total votes		54,771	100.00

=== Republican primary ===
==== Candidates ====
===== Nominee =====
- Bill Choby

===== Eliminated in primary =====
- Michael A. Buben

==== Primary results ====
Republican primary results
Party	Candidate	Votes	%
Republican	Bill Choby	19,280	50.54
Republican	Michael A. Buben	18,868	49.46
Total votes		38,148	100.00

=== General election ===
Pennsylvania's 12th congressional district, 1994
Party	Candidate	Votes	%
Democratic	John Murtha (incumbent)	117,825	68.90
Republican	Bill Choby	53,147	31.08
Write-in		33	0.02
Total votes		171,005	100.00
Democratic hold			

==== By county ====
County	John Murtha Democratic		Bill Choby Republican		Write-in		Margin		Total votes cast
County	#	%	#	%	#	%	#	%	Total votes cast
Armstrong	13,476	63.31%	7,809	36.69%	0	0.00%	5,667	26.62%	21,285
Cambria	41,651	76.75%	12,617	23.25%	0	0.00%	29,034	53.50%	54,268
Clarion	218	59.40%	149	40.60%	0	0.00%	69	18.80%	367
Fayette	8,865	70.48%	3,713	29.52%	0	0.00%	5,152	40.96%	12,578
Indiana	16,602	65.77%	8,633	34.20%	7	0.03%	7,969	31.57%	25,242
Somerset	16,643	61.49%	10,393	38.40%	31	0.11%	6,250	23.09%	27,067
Westmoreland	20,361	67.43%	9,831	32.56%	2	0.01%	10,530	34.87%	30,194
Totals	117,816	68.90%	53,145	31.08%	40	0.02%	64,671	37.82%	171,001

== District 13 ==
1994 Pennsylvania's 13th congressional district election
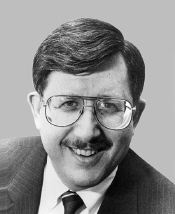

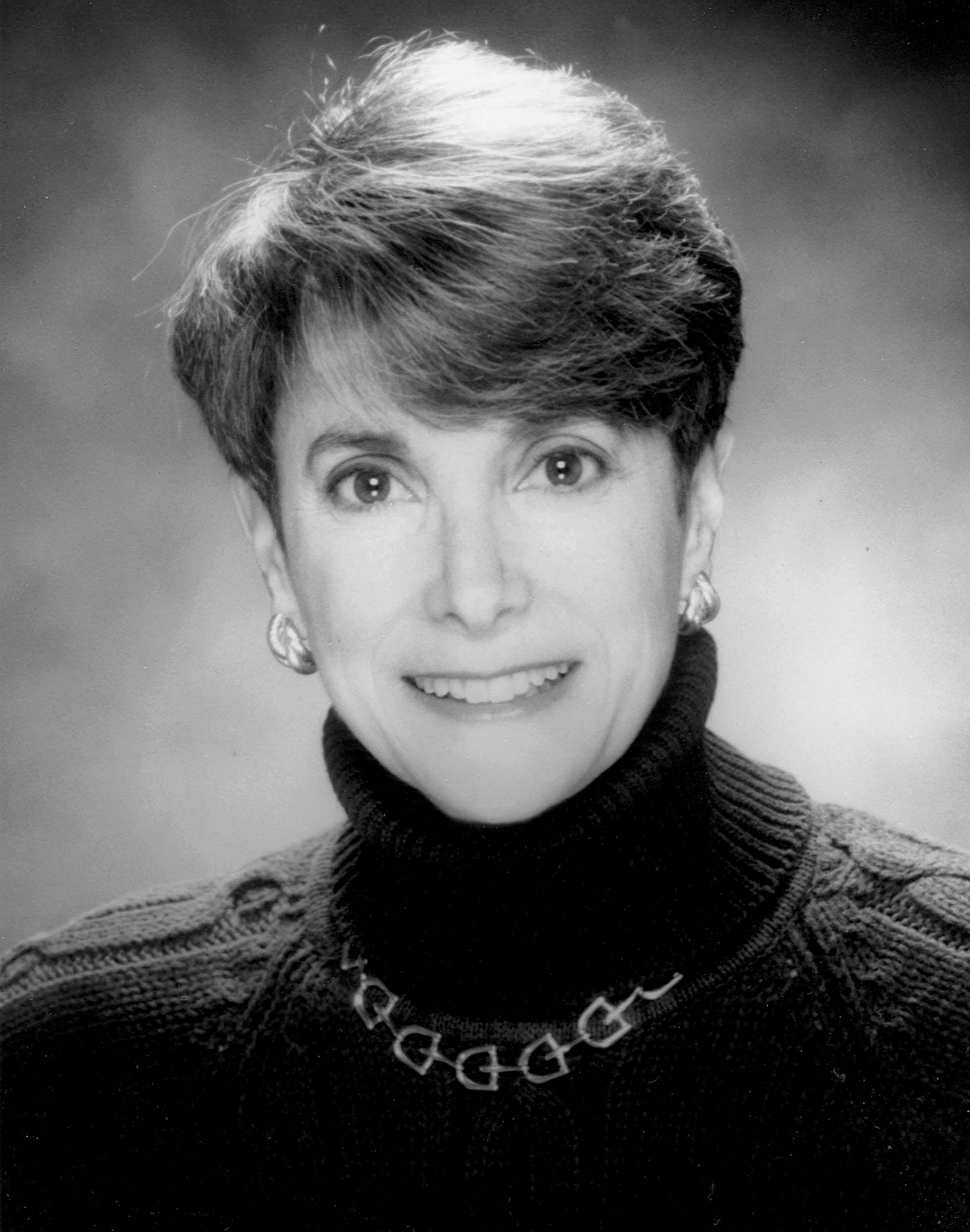
Nominee	Jon D. Fox	Marjorie Margolies-Mezvinsky
Party	Republican	Democratic
Popular vote	96,254	88,073
Percentage	49.41%	45.21%
U.S. Representative before election
Marjorie Margolies-Mezvinsky
Democratic
Elected U.S. Representative
Jon D. Fox
Republican

Incumbent U.S. Representative Marjorie Margolies-Mezvinsky lost reelection to Jon D. Fox, thereby flipping the seat to the Republicans.

=== Democratic primary ===
==== Candidates ====
===== Nominee =====
- Marjorie Margolies-Mezvinsky, incumbent U.S. representative

==== Primary results ====
Democratic primary results
Party	Candidate	Votes	%
Democratic	Marjorie Margolies-Mezvinsky (incumbent)	21,494	100.00
Total votes		21,494	100.00

=== Republican primary ===
==== Candidates ====
===== Nominee =====
- Jon D. Fox, member of the Montgomery County Board of Commissioners (1992–present) and Pennsylvania House of Representatives (1985–1992)

===== Eliminated in primary =====
- Michael J. Becker
- Ellen Harley
- Gayle Michael
- John J. Murray

==== Primary results ====
Republican primary results
Party	Candidate	Votes	%
Republican	Jon D. Fox	24,929	33.50
Republican	Ellen Harley	16,868	18.70
Republican	John J. Murray	12,529	13.35
Republican	Michael J. Becker	10,576	11.49
Republican	Gayle Michael	23,388	31.96
Total votes		88,290	100.00

=== General election ===
Pennsylvania's 13th congressional district, 1994
Party	Candidate	Votes	%
Republican	Jon D. Fox	96,254	49.41
Democratic	Marjorie Margolies-Mezvinsky (incumbent)	88,073	45.21
Libertarian	Lee D. Hustead	7,183	3.69
Citizens with Szabo	Frank W. Szabo	3,278	1.68
Total votes		194,788	100.00
Republican gain from Democratic			

==== By county ====
County	Jon D. Fox Republican		Marjorie Margolies-Mezvinsky Democratic		Lee Hustead Libertarian		Frank Szabo Independent		Margin		Total votes cast
County	#	%	#	%	#	%	#	%	#	%	Total votes cast
Montgomery	96,254	49.41%	88,073	45.21%	7,183	3.69%	3,278	1.68%	8,181	4.20%	194,788
Totals	96,254	49.41%	88,073	45.21%	7,183	3.69%	3,278	1.68%	8,181	4.20%	194,788

== District 14 ==
1994 Pennsylvania's 14th congressional district election
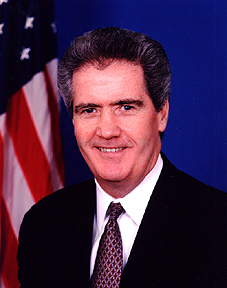

Nominee	William J. Coyne	John Robert Clark
Party	Democratic	Republican
Popular vote	105,310	53,221
Percentage	64.13%	32.41%
U.S. Representative before election
William J. Coyne
Democratic
Elected U.S. Representative
William J. Coyne
Democratic

=== Democratic primary ===
==== Candidates ====
===== Nominee =====
- William J. Coyne, incumbent U.S. representative

==== Primary results ====
Democratic primary results
Party	Candidate	Votes	%
Democratic	William J. Coyne (incumbent)	65,409	100.00
Total votes		65,409	100.00

=== Republican primary ===
==== Candidates ====
===== Nominee =====
- John Robert Clark

==== Primary results ====
Republican primary results
Party	Candidate	Votes	%
Republican	John Robert Clark	20,794	100.00
Total votes		20,794	100.00

=== General election ===
Pennsylvania's 14th congressional district, 1994
Party	Candidate	Votes	%
Democratic	William J. Coyne (incumbent)	105,310	64.13
Republican	John Robert Clark	53,221	32.41
Patriot	Edward L. Stewart	3,826	2.33
Workers League	Paul Scherrer	1,819	1.11
Write-in		34	0.02
Total votes		164,210	100.00
Democratic hold			

==== By county ====
County	William J. Coyne Democratic		John Robert Clark Republican		Edward Stewart Patriot		Paul Scherrer Workers League		Margin		Total votes cast
County	#	%	#	%	#	%	#	%	#	%	Total votes cast
Allegheny	105,310	64.14%	53,221	32.42%	3,826	2.33%	1,819	1.11%	52,089	31.73%	164,176
Totals	105,310	64.14%	53,221	32.42%	3,826	2.33%	1,819	1.11%	52,089	31.73%	164,176

== District 15 ==
1994 Pennsylvania's 15th congressional district election
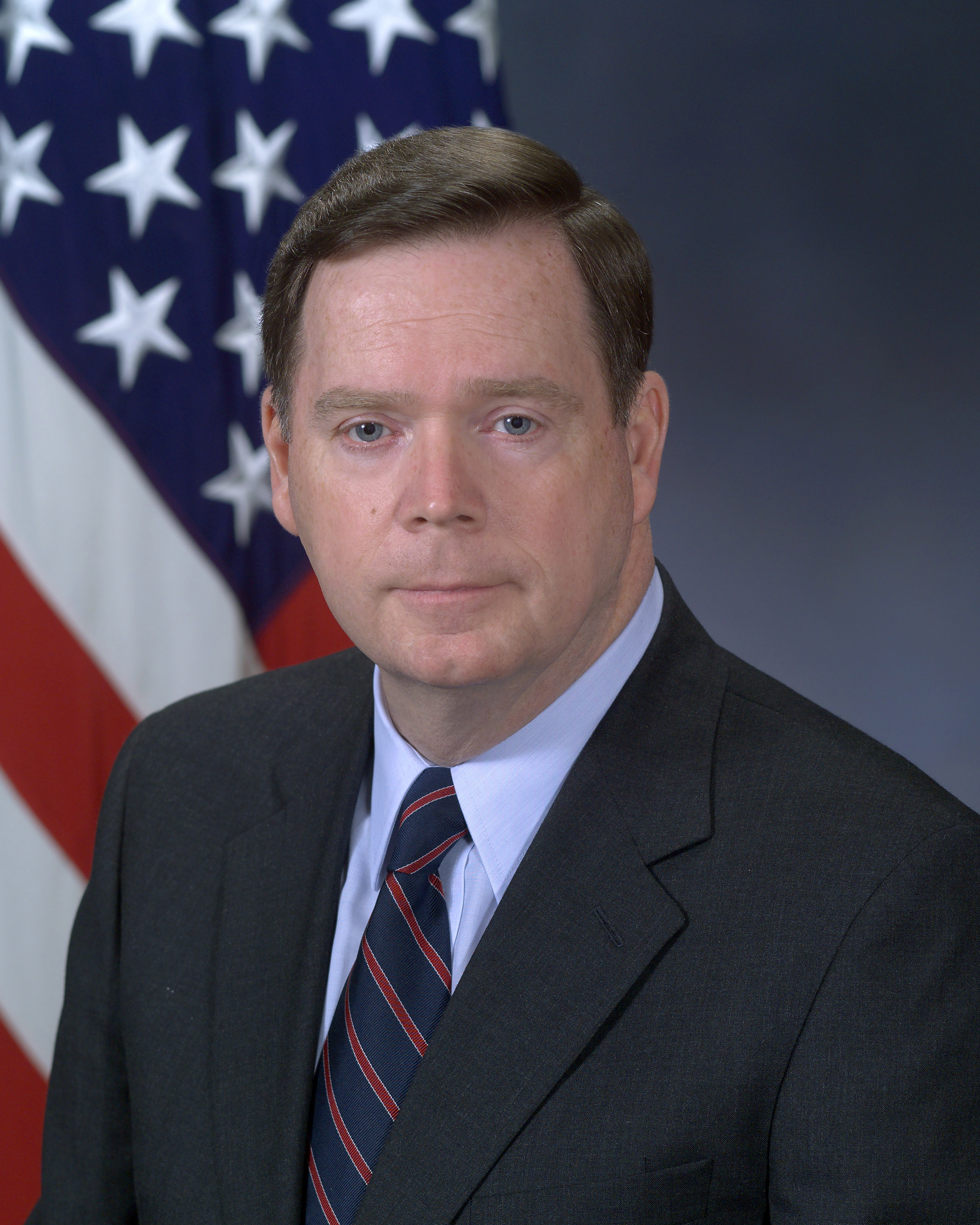

Nominee	Paul McHale	Jim Yeager
Party	Democratic	Republican
Popular vote	72,073	71,602
Percentage	47.76%	47.45%
U.S. Representative before election
Paul McHale
Democratic
Elected U.S. Representative
Paul McHale
Democratic

=== Democratic primary ===
==== Candidates ====
===== Nominee =====
- Paul McHale, incumbent U.S. representative

==== Primary results ====
Democratic primary results
Party	Candidate	Votes	%
Democratic	Paul McHale (incumbent)	26,550	100.00
Total votes		26,550	100.00

=== Republican primary ===
==== Candidates ====
===== Nominee =====
- Jim Yeager

===== Eliminated in primary =====
- Bob Kilbanks

==== Primary results ====
Republican primary results
Party	Candidate	Votes	%
Republican	Jim Yeager	19,972	68.04
Republican	Bob Kilbanks	9,383	31.96
Total votes		29,355	100.00

=== General election ===
Pennsylvania's 15th congressional district, 1994
Party	Candidate	Votes	%
Democratic	Paul McHale (incumbent)	72,073	47.76
Republican	Jim Yeager	71,602	47.45
Patriot	Victor Mazziotti	7,227	4.79
Write-in		7	0.00
Total votes		150,909	100.00
Democratic hold			

==== By county ====
County	Paul McHale Democratic		Jim Yeager Republican		Victor Mazziotti Patriot		Write-in		Margin		Total votes cast
County	#	%	#	%	#	%	#	%	#	%	Total votes cast
Lehigh	36,081	46.71%	37,462	48.49%	3,705	4.80%	4	0.01%	–1,381	–1.78%	77,252
Montgomery	2,464	34.63%	4,511	63.40%	140	1.97%	0	0.00%	–2,047	–28.77%	7,115
Northampton	33,528	50.39%	29,629	44.53%	3,382	5.08%	3	0.00%	3,899	5.86%	66,542
Totals	72,073	47.76%	71,602	47.45%	7,227	4.79%	7	0.00%	471	0.31%	150,909

== District 16 ==
1994 Pennsylvania's 16th congressional district election
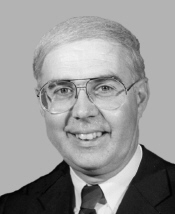

Nominee	Bob Walker	Bill Chertok
Party	Republican	Democratic
Popular vote	109,759	47,680
Percentage	69.71%	30.28%
U.S. Representative before election
Bob Walker
Republican
Elected U.S. Representative
Bob Walker
Republican

=== Democratic primary ===
==== Candidates ====
===== Nominee =====
- Bill Chertok

===== Eliminated in primary =====
- Donald Tony Hadley

==== Primary results ====
Democratic primary results
Party	Candidate	Votes	%
Democratic	Bill Chertok	13,235	83.60
Democratic	Donald Tony Hadley	2,596	16.40
Total votes		15,831	100.00

=== Republican primary ===
==== Candidates ====
===== Nominee =====
- Bob Walker, incumbent U.S. representative

==== Primary results ====
Republican primary results
Party	Candidate	Votes	%
Republican	Bob Walker (incumbent)	54,345	100.00
Total votes		54,345	100.00

=== General election ===
Pennsylvania's 16th congressional district, 1994
Party	Candidate	Votes	%
Republican	Bob Walker (incumbent)	109,759	69.71
Democratic	Bill Chertok	47,680	30.28
Write-in		16	0.01
Total votes		157,455	100.00
Republican hold			

==== By county ====
County	Bob Walker Republican		Bill Chertok Democratic		Write-in		Margin		Total votes cast
County	#	%	#	%	#	%	#	%	Total votes cast
Chester	54,276	67.45%	26,005	32.32%	182	0.23%	28,271	35.13%	80,463
Lancaster	55,445	71.88%	21,676	28.10%	16	0.02%	33,769	43.78%	77,137
Totals	109,721	69.62%	47,681	30.25%	198	0.13%	62,040	39.37%	157,600

== District 17 ==
1994 Pennsylvania's 17th congressional district election
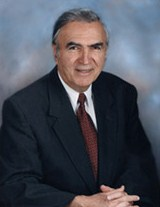
Nominee	George Gekas
Party	Republican
Popular vote	133,788
Percentage	99.86%
U.S. Representative before election
George Gekas
Republican
Elected U.S. Representative
George Gekas
Republican

=== Republican primary ===
==== Candidates ====
===== Nominee =====
- George Gekas, incumbent U.S. representative

==== Primary results ====
Republican primary results
Party	Candidate	Votes	%
Republican	George Gekas (incumbent)	61,366	100.00
Total votes		61,366	100.00

=== General election ===
Pennsylvania's 17th congressional district, 1994
Party	Candidate	Votes	%
Republican	George Gekas (incumbent)	133,788	99.86
Write-in		187	0.14
Total votes		133,975	100.00
Republican hold			

==== By county ====
County	George Gekas Republican		Write-in		Margin		Total votes cast
County	#	%	#	%	#	%	Total votes cast
Cumberland	14,397	100.00%	0	0.00%	14,397	100.00%	14,397
Dauphin	60,259	100.00%	0	0.00%	60,259	100.00%	60,259
Lancaster	29,799	99.87%	39	0.13%	29,760	99.74%	29,838
Lebanon	22,249	100.00%	0	0.00%	22,249	100.00%	22,249
Perry	7,084	100.00%	0	0.00%	7,084	100.00%	7,084
Totals	133,788	99.97%	39	0.03%	133,749	99.94%	133,827

== District 18 ==
1994 Pennsylvania's 18th congressional district election
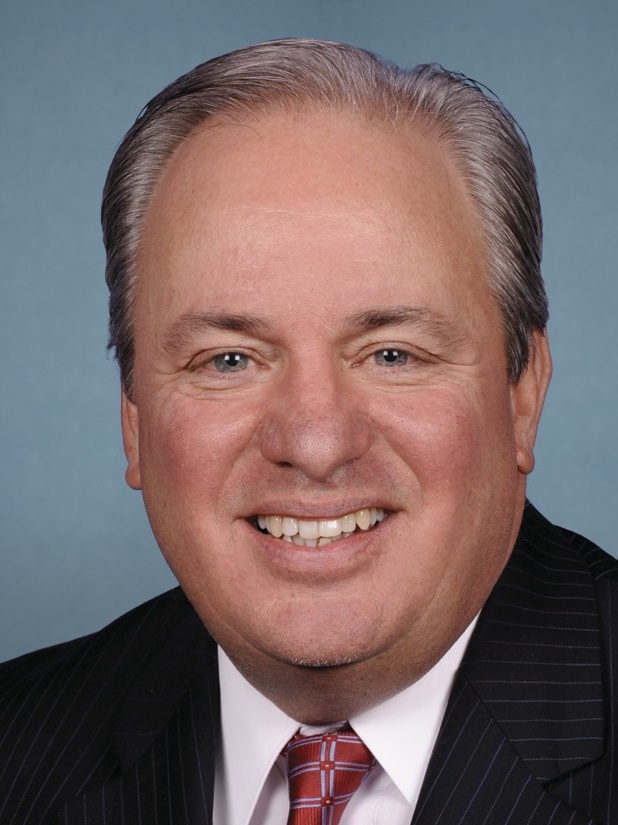

Nominee	Mike Doyle	John McCarty
Party	Democratic	Republican
Popular vote	101,784	83,881
Percentage	54.80%	45.16%
U.S. Representative before election
Rick Santorum
Republican
Elected U.S. Representative
Mike Doyle
Democratic

Incumbent U.S. Representative Rick Santorum retired to run for U.S. senator. Mike Doyle flipped the seat for the Democrats.

=== Democratic primary ===
==== Candidates ====
===== Nominee =====
- Mike Doyle, Swissvale Borough Council member (1977–1981) and legislative aide

===== Eliminated in primary =====
- Mike Adams
- Richard Edward Caligiuri
- Jon Delano
- Chris McNally
- Arthur J. Murphy Jr
- Joseph Rudolph

==== Primary results ====
Democratic primary results
Party	Candidate	Votes	%
Democratic	Mike Doyle	16,571	19.85
Democratic	Mike Adams	15,055	18.03
Democratic	Richard Edward Caligiuri	12,077	14.46
Democratic	Jon Delano	10,930	13.09
Democratic	Chris McNally	10,720	12.84
Democratic	Arthur J. Murphy Jr	10,202	12.22
Democratic	Joseph Rudolph	7,947	9.52
Total votes		83,502	100.00

=== Republican primary ===
==== Candidates ====
===== Nominee =====
- John McCarty

===== Eliminated in primary =====
- Pat Dolan
- Bill Gallagher
- Allan Wampler

==== Primary results ====
Republican primary results
Party	Candidate	Votes	%
Republican	John McCarty	12,996	35.57
Republican	Allan Wampler	12,368	33.85
Republican	Pat Dolan	7,770	21.26
Republican	Bill Gallagher	3,405	9.32
Total votes		36,539	100.00

=== General election ===
Pennsylvania's 18th congressional district, 1994
Party	Candidate	Votes	%
Democratic	Mike Doyle	101,784	54.80
Republican	John McCarty	83,881	45.16
Write-in		85	0.05
Total votes		185,750	100.00
Democratic gain from Republican			

==== By county ====
County	Mike Doyle Democratic		John McCarty Republican		Write-in		Margin		Total votes cast
County	#	%	#	%	#	%	#	%	Total votes cast
Allegheny	101,784	54.80%	83,881	45.16%	85	0.05%	17,903	9.64%	185,750
Totals	101,784	54.80%	83,881	45.16%	85	0.05%	17,903	9.64%	185,750

== District 19 ==
1994 Pennsylvania's 19th congressional district election
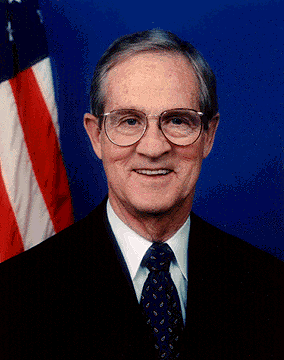
Nominee	Bill Goodling
Party	Republican
Popular vote	124,496
Percentage	99.50%
U.S. Representative before election
Bill Goodling
Republican
Elected U.S. Representative
Bill Goodling
Republican

=== Republican primary ===
==== Candidates ====
===== Nominee =====
- Bill Goodling, incumbent U.S. representative

==== Primary results ====
Republican primary results
Party	Candidate	Votes	%
Republican	Bill Goodling (incumbent)	43,984	100.00
Total votes		43,984	100.00

=== General election ===
Pennsylvania's 19th congressional district, 1994
Party	Candidate	Votes	%
Republican	Bill Goodling (incumbent)	124,496	99.50
Write-in		621	0.50
Total votes		125,117	100.00
Republican hold			

==== By county ====
County	Bill Goodling Republican		Write-in		Margin		Total votes cast
County	#	%	#	%	#	%	Total votes cast
Adams	18,003	99.63%	66	0.37%	17,937	99.26%	18,069
Cumberland	37,100	100.00%	0	0.00%	37,100	100.00%	37,100
York	69,393	100.00%	0	0.00%	69,393	100.00%	69,393
Totals	124,496	99.95%	66	99.89%	124,430	99.89%	124,562

== District 20 ==
1994 Pennsylvania's 20th congressional district
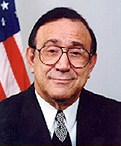

Nominee	Frank Mascara	Mike McCormick
Party	Democratic	Republican
Popular vote	95,251	84,156
Percentage	53.09%	46.90%
U.S. Representative before election
Austin Murphy
Democratic
Elected U.S. Representative
Frank Mascara
Democratic

Incumbent U.S. Representative Austin Murphy retired, with Frank Mascara succeeding him.

=== Democratic primary ===
==== Candidates ====
===== Nominee =====
- Frank Mascara, Washington County commissioner (1980–present) and 1992 candidate

===== Eliminated in primary =====
- Alan Benyak
- Charlie Kelly

==== Primary results ====
Democratic primary results
Party	Candidate	Votes	%
Democratic	Frank Mascara	41,252	53.93
Democratic	Charlie Kelly	23,451	30.66
Democratic	Alan Benyak	11,791	15.41
Total votes		76,494	100.00

=== Republican primary ===
==== Candidates ====
===== Nominee =====
- Mike McCormick

===== Eliminated in primary =====
- Bill Townsend

==== Primary results ====
Republican primary results
Party	Candidate	Votes	%
Republican	Mike McCormick	16,966	52.36
Republican	Bill Townsend	15,434	47.64
Total votes		32,400	100.00

=== General election ===
Pennsylvania's 20th congressional district, 1994
Party	Candidate	Votes	%
Democratic	Frank Mascara	95,251	53.09
Republican	Mike McCormick	84,156	46.90
Write-in		12	0.01
Total votes		179,419	100.00
Democratic hold			

==== By county ====
County	Frank Mascara Democratic		Mike McCormick Republican		Margin		Total votes cast
County	#	%	#	%	#	%	Total votes cast
Allegheny	17,070	39.77%	25,855	60.23%	–8,785	–20.46%	42,925
Fayette	16,757	67.89%	7,927	32.11%	8,830	35.78%	24,684
Greene	7,389	62.27%	4,477	37.73%	2,912	24.54%	11,866
Washington	35,806	54.37%	30,051	45.63%	5,755	8.74%	65,857
Westmoreland	18,153	53.57%	15,730	46.42%	2,423	7.15%	33,889
Totals	95,175	53.10%	84,040	46.89%	11,135	6.21%	179,215

== District 21 ==
1994 Pennsylvania's 21st congressional district election
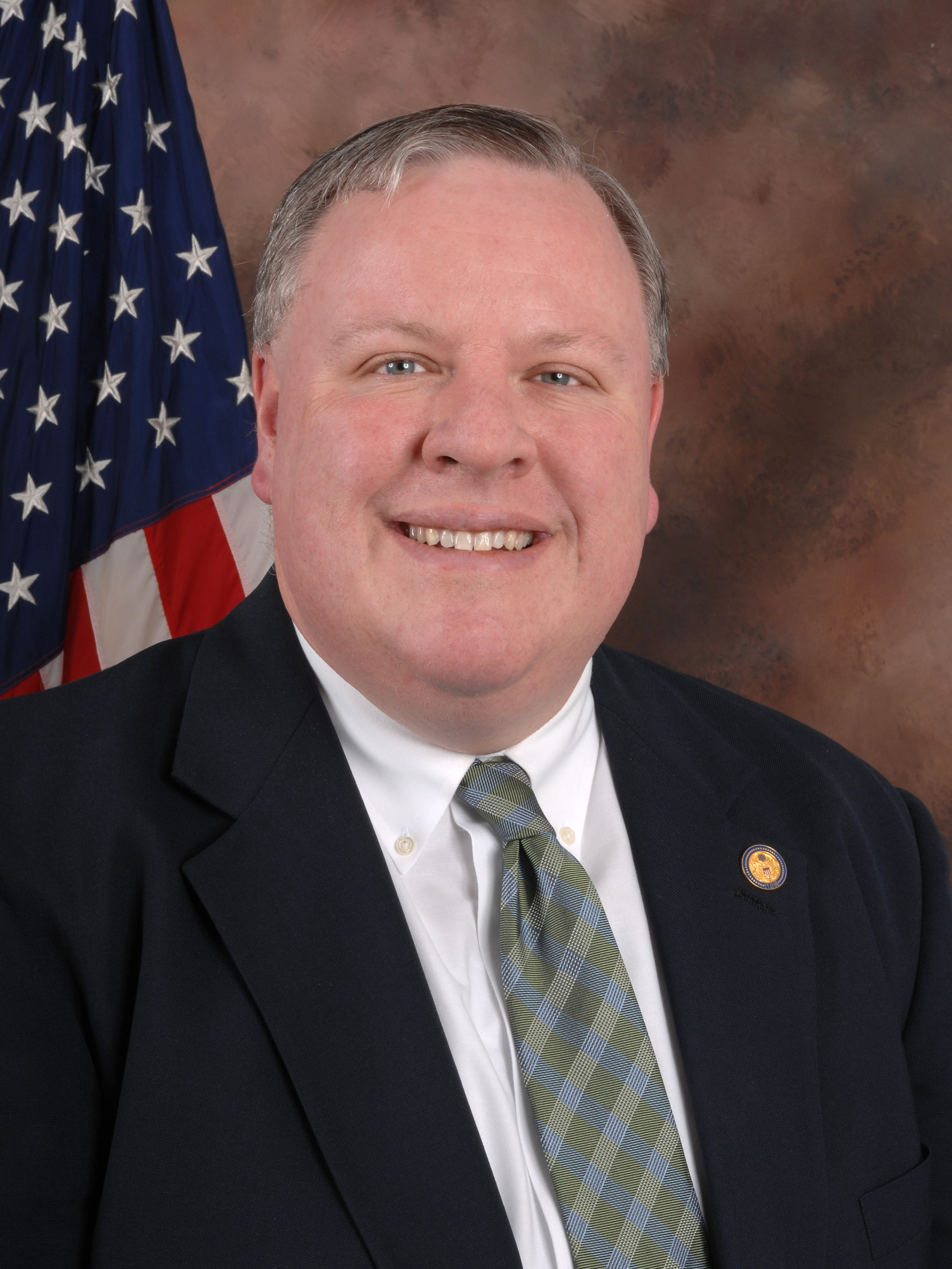

Nominee	Phil English	Bill Leavens
Party	Republican	Democratic
Popular vote	89,439	84,796
Percentage	49.46%	46.89%
U.S. Representative before election
Tom Ridge
Republican
Elected U.S. Representative
Phil English
Republican

Incumbent U.S. Representative Tom Ridge retired to run for governor, with Phil English holding the seat for the Republicans.

=== Democratic primary ===
==== Candidates ====
===== Nominee =====
- Bill Leavens

===== Eliminated in primary =====
- Anthony Andrezeski, member of the Pennsylvania State Senate (1981–present)
- Dave DiCarlo
- Ron DiNicola, U.S. Marine veteran and Erie County solicitor
- Judy Lynch

==== Primary results ====
Democratic primary results
Party	Candidate	Votes	%
Democratic	Bill Leavens	14,178	22.73
Democratic	Anthony Andrezeski	13,846	22.20
Democratic	Judy Lynch	12,151	19.48
Democratic	Ron DiNicola	11,913	19.10
Democratic	Dave DiCarlo	10,274	16.47
Total votes		62,362	100.00

=== Republican primary ===
==== Candidates ====
===== Nominee =====
- Phil English, Erie County controller (1985–1989) and 1988 Republican nominee for state treasurer

===== Eliminated in primary =====
- Mary Ann McConnell

==== Primary results ====
Republican primary results
Party	Candidate	Votes	%
Republican	Phil English	40,770	66.25
Republican	Mary Ann McConnell	20,769	33.75
Total votes		61,539	100.00

=== General election ===
Pennsylvania's 21st congressional district, 1994
Party	Candidate	Votes	%
Republican	Phil English	89,439	49.46
Democratic	Bill Leavens	84,796	46.89
Independent	Arthur E. Drew	6,588	3.64
Write-in		6	0.00
Total votes		180,829	100.00
Republican hold			

==== By county ====
County	Phil English Republican		Bill Leavens Democratic		Arthur Drew Independent		Write-in		Margin		Total votes cast
County	#	%	#	%	#	%	#	%	#	%	Total votes cast
Butler	17,360	53.29%	13,459	41.32%	1,753	5.38%	3	0.01%	3,901	11.97%	32,575
Crawford	10,932	54.59%	8,523	42.56%	570	2.85%	0	0.00%	2,409	12.03%	20,025
Erie	45,319	49.58%	42,633	46.64%	3,448	3.77%	0	0.00%	2,686	2.94%	91,400
Mercer	15,235	42.48%	19,840	55.32%	787	2.19%	3	0.01%	–4,605	–12.84%	35,865
Totals	88,846	49.40%	84,455	46.95%	6,558	3.65%	6	0.00%	4,391	2.44%	179,865

== See also ==
- Pennsylvania's congressional delegations
- 104th United States Congress
