= Ken Mascara =

Ken J. Mascara

Sheriff of St. Lucie County, Florida
- In office January 3, 2001 – December 1, 2023
- Preceded by: Robert C. "Bobby" Knowles
- Succeeded by: Keith Pearson

Personal details
- Born: July 8, 1958 (age 68) Hollywood, Florida, US
- Party: Democratic

Ken J. Mascara (born July 8, 1958) was the Sheriff of St. Lucie County, Florida, United States, and was the elected top official of the St. Lucie County Sheriff's Office, one of the largest law enforcement agencies on the Treasure Coast of Florida. Ken J. Mascara is the nephew of former congressman Frank R. Mascara, a Democratic politician from Pennsylvania who served four terms in the United States House of Representatives from 1995 to 2003. Ken Mascara is also a Democrat. First elected in 2000, Mascara served six terms as sheriff and retired December 1, 2023.

== Biography ==
Ken J. Mascara was born on July 8, 1958, in Hollywood, Florida. His educational background includes an Associate of Arts/Associate of Science degree at Indian River State College; Doctor of Chiropractic degree at Life University. He is a graduate of the Executive Development Seminar at the FBI Academy and a graduate of the National Executive Institute at the FBI Academy.

During the 2020 elections, he created, funded, and recruited a ghost campaign for the Republican Primary. He succeeded in being able to choose his General Election opponent, who did not campaign further for the position and resided out of state for months leading up the election. FDLE tasked the State Attorney of the 18th District of Florida to investigate. While making findings of the scheme, the State Attorney chose not to prosecute Mascara and cohorts. In June 2024 the Florida Commission on Ethics found probable cause to investigate this charge further. In a filing Mascara admitted to the scheme and offered to pay a $5,000 fine. The Commission can now vote to accept or reject the settlement at their next scheduled meeting.

== Awards ==
Ken J. Mascara has received a number of awards for his service to his community and profession. He was the 1988 Citizen of the Year. He was the Law Enforcement Officer of the Year in 2002 and 2004, and received the 2002 Distinguished Citizen Award, Boy Scouts of America Gulf Stream Council.
