= Frank Mascara =

American politician (1930–2011)

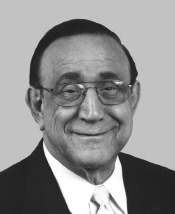

Member of the U.S. House of Representatives from Pennsylvania's 20th district
- In office January 3, 1995 – January 3, 2003
- Preceded by: Austin Murphy
- Succeeded by: Tim Murphy (redistricting)

Personal details
- Born: January 19, 1930 Belle Vernon, Pennsylvania, U.S.
- Died: July 10, 2011 (aged 81) Monongahela, Pennsylvania, U.S.
- Party: Democratic
- Relatives: Ken Mascara (nephew)

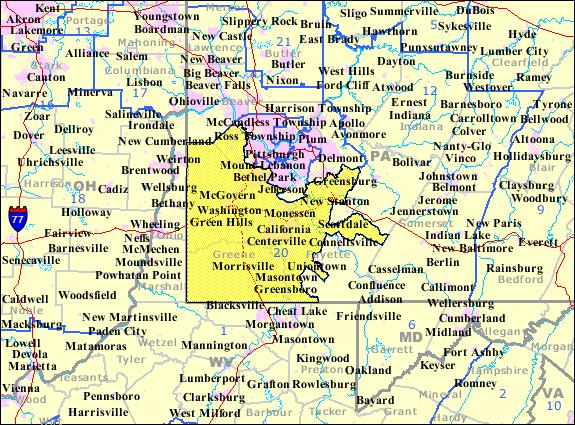
Mascara's district from 1995 to 2003

Frank Robert Mascara (January 19, 1930 – July 10, 2011) was an American Democratic politician from Pennsylvania who served four terms in the United States House of Representatives from 1995 to 2003.

== Early life, education, and early political career ==
Mascara briefly served in the United States Army after World War II and was an accountant before entering politics. He obtained a B.A. from California University of Pennsylvania in 1972.

Mascara next served as an elected official in Washington County, near Pittsburgh, for nearly 20 years. He was elected county controller in 1973 and as County Commissioner in 1979. He served on the Washington County Commission for 15 years, many of them as chairman.

== U.S. House of Representatives ==
=== Elections ===
Before 2000 Census

In 1992, Mascara launched a primary challenge to U.S. Congressman Austin Murphy, a 16-year incumbent, in the 20th Congressional District, which comprised most of the southern suburbs of Pittsburgh. He lost the race by 3,000 votes. When Murphy retired two years later, Mascara handily won the Democratic primary to replace him. Although the 20th was considered the most Democratic district in Pennsylvania outside the districts based in Philadelphia and Pittsburgh, Mascara earned a narrow victory in the general election against Republican businessman Mike McCormick. Mascara faced the same opponent — and another narrow win — in 1996. However, the district reverted to form afterwards, and Mascara was unopposed in 1998. He easily won a fourth term in 2000.

After 2000 Census

The Republican-controlled state legislature significantly altered Mascara's district. The district was renumbered as the 18th District, and was considerably more affluent than its predecessor. It was also somewhat friendlier to Republicans, even though there were still 70,000 more registered Democrats in the district than Republicans. A large portion of the area Mascara had represented for the past eight years was shifted to the neighboring Johnstown-based 12th District, represented by 28-year incumbent Democrat John Murtha.

The newly drawn district was widely criticized, since portions of several neighborhoods were split between two districts. In some cases, one side of the street was in the 18th while the other was in the 12th; in others, one side of the street was in the 18th while the other was in the Pittsburgh-based 14th. In one of the more extreme examples, most of Mascara's hometown, Charleroi—including most of his neighborhood—was drawn into the 12th. However, a long tendril extending from his house to Allegheny County remained in the 18th.

Mascara opted to run against Murtha in the 12th's Democratic primary, since the redrawn 12th contained more of Mascara's old territory than Murtha's. After a bruising primary filled with negative campaigning by both candidates, Murtha won by a wider than expected margin. The 18th was taken over by Republican State Senator Tim Murphy.

=== Tenure ===
In Congress, Mascara was a moderate Democrat who opposed abortion and gun control, but whose voting record was otherwise consistent with the Democratic line. He was regarded as a political powerbroker among Democrats with a record of scoring federal money for local projects.

In both Washington and his home district, Mascara projected a blue-collar, working class image. He liked to say frequently, "I don't go to the nightclubs and big restaurants. ... I don't drink. I don't gamble. I don't whore around."

== Death ==
Mascara died of lung cancer on July 10, 2011, at Mon Valley Hospital in Monongahela, Pennsylvania.

== Electoral history ==
Pennsylvania's 20th congressional district: Results 1992–2000
Year	Democrat	Votes	Pct	Republican	Votes	Pct	
1994	Frank Mascara	95,251	53%	Mike McCormick	84,156	47%	*
1996	Frank Mascara	113,394	54%	Mike McCormick	97,004	46%	*
1998	Frank Mascara	97,885	100%	(no candidate)			*
2000	Frank Mascara	145,131	64%	Ronald J. Davis	80,312	36%	

Write-in and minor candidate notes: In 1994, write-ins received 12 votes. In 1996, write-ins received 4 votes. In 1998, write-ins received 190 votes.

U.S. House of Representatives
Preceded by Austin Murphy	Member of the U.S. House of Representatives from Pennsylvania's 20th congressional district 1995–2003	Succeeded by District abolished^{1}
Notes and references
1. Tim Murphy was elected to the 18th district seat, which takes-in much of the same areas as the old 20th district.
