= Howland (surname) =

Howland is an English surname. Notable people with the surname include:

- Alfred Cornelius Howland (1838–1909), American painter
- Ben Howland (born 1957), American college basketball coach
- Benjamin Howland (1755–1821), United States Senator from Rhode Island
- Beth Howland (1941–2015), American stage and television actress
- Bette Howland (1937–2017), American writer and literary critic
- Chris Howland (1928–2013), British radio and television presenter
- Christopher Howland (1936–2010), English cricketer
- David Howland (born 1986), Northern Irish footballer
- Edna Howland (1886–1964), American vaudeville artist
- Edwin Howland (1838–1876), American architect
- Eliza Howland (1826–1917), American author
- Emily Howland (1827–1929), American philanthropist and educator
- Esther Allen Howland (1801–1860), American cookbook author
- Esther Howland (1828–1904), American artist and businesswoman
- Fred Howland (1864–1953), Vermont attorney, businessman, and Republican politician
- Jason Howland (born 1971), American composer
- Jobyna Howland (1880–1936), American stage and screen actress
- John Howland (1592/3–1672/3), Mayflower passenger and early settler in the United States
- John Howland (doctor) (1873–1926), American pediatrician
- Joe Wiseman Howland (1908–1978), American researcher in radiation toxicity, health and safety
- Joseph Howland (1834–1886), American Civil War veteran who later served as New York State Treasurer
- Marie Howland (1836–1921), American feminist writer
- Mark Howland (born 1954), Massachusetts politician
- Meredith Howland (1833–1912), American soldier and society man
- Olin Howland (1886–1959), American film and theatre actor
- Oliver Howland (1847–1905), Canadian lawyer and political figure
- Paul Howland (1865–1942), American lawyer and politician
- Richard Howland (1540–1600), English academic and bishop
- Robert Howland (1905–1986), English track and field athlete
- Russell Howland (1908–1995), American music educator
- Samuel Shaw Howland (1790–1853), American businessman
- William Howland (disambiguation), several people

== See also ==
- Howlin (surname)
