= 1976 United States presidential election in Ohio =

- November 2, 1976

Nominee	Jimmy Carter	Gerald Ford
Party	Democratic	Republican
Home state	Georgia	Michigan
Running mate	Walter Mondale	Bob Dole
Electoral vote	25	0
Popular vote	2,011,621	2,000,505
Percentage	48.92%	48.65%
County results
Carter
40–50%
50–60%
60–70%
Ford
40–50%
50–60%
60–70%
President before election
Gerald Ford
Republican
Elected President
Jimmy Carter
Democratic

The 1976 United States presidential election in Ohio took place on November 2, 1976. All 50 states and the District of Columbia were part of the 1976 United States presidential election. State voters chose 25 electors to the Electoral College, who voted for president and vice president.

Ohio was won by former Georgia Governor Jimmy Carter (D) by a margin of 0.27%, which made the state almost 2% more Republican than the nation-at-large. As of the 2024 presidential election, this is the last election in which Adams County and Brown County voted for a Democratic presidential candidate, the last time until 2020 when Wood County voted for a losing candidate, and the last time that a Democrat would win Ohio while losing neighboring Michigan. It would also be the last election in which a Democratic Candidate won the state by under 1%, as Presidents Barack Obama and Bill Clinton won Ohio in both of their runs by more than 1%

The state was not only one of the closest states in the election, but it was called for Carter after he won Wisconsin, the tipping-point state of the election. Ohio, Mississippi, and Wisconsin were the only three states that Carter won without receiving above 50 percent of the vote. Wisconsin and Ohio were the two closest states that Carter won, and if Carter had lost both, he would have lost the election to Ford.

== Results ==
1976 United States presidential election in Ohio
Party	Candidate	Running mate	Votes	Percentage	Electoral votes
Democratic	Jimmy Carter	Walter Mondale	2,011,621	48.92%	25
Republican	Gerald Ford (incumbent)	Bob Dole	2,000,505	48.65%	0
Not Designated	Eugene McCarthy	Dennis Anderson	58,258	1.42%	0
American	Lester Maddox	William Dyke	15,529	0.38%	0
Not Designated	Roger MacBride	David Bergland	8,961	0.22%	0
Not Designated	Gus Hall	Jarvis Tyner	7,817	0.19%	0
Not Designated	Peter Camejo	Willie Mae Reed	4,717	0.11%	0
Not Designated	Lyndon LaRouche	R. Wayne Evans	4,335	0.11%	0
Write-in	Julius Levin	Constance Blomen	68	0.00%	0
Write-in	Benjamin Bubar	Earl Dodge	62	0.00%	0
Totals			4,107,408	100.00%	25

=== Results by county ===
County	Jimmy Carter Democratic		Gerald Ford Republican		Eugene McCarthy Not Designated		Lester Maddox American		Various candidates Other parties		Margin		Total votes cast
County	#	%	#	%	#	%	#	%	#	%	#	%	Total votes cast
Adams	4,450	50.68%	4,197	47.80%	55	0.63%	47	0.54%	20	0.23%	253	2.88%	8,780
Allen	14,627	37.35%	23,721	60.56%	478	1.22%	201	0.51%	71	0.18%	-9,094	-23.21%	39,167
Ashland	7,205	41.52%	9,761	56.25%	256	1.48%	71	0.41%	28	0.16%	-2,556	-14.73%	17,354
Ashtabula	20,883	54.07%	16,885	43.72%	595	1.54%	137	0.36%	59	0.15%	3,998	10.35%	38,625
Athens	9,896	52.04%	8,387	44.10%	581	3.06%	24	0.13%	82	0.43%	1,509	7.94%	19,016
Auglaize	5,840	36.58%	9,772	61.21%	205	1.29%	99	0.62%	20	0.13%	-3,932	-24.63%	15,965
Belmont	21,162	60.09%	13,550	38.47%	305	0.87%	72	0.20%	86	0.24%	7,612	21.62%	35,219
Brown	5,432	53.64%	4,549	44.92%	87	0.86%	37	0.37%	10	0.10%	883	8.72%	10,126
Butler	35,123	40.74%	49,625	57.56%	817	0.95%	286	0.33%	236	0.27%	-14,502	-16.82%	86,217
Carroll	5,006	48.48%	5,091	49.31%	113	1.10%	72	0.70%	21	0.20%	-85	-0.83%	10,325
Champaign	4,748	41.28%	6,526	56.74%	135	1.18%	48	0.42%	28	0.24%	-1,778	-15.46%	11,502
Clark	26,135	47.81%	26,745	48.93%	699	1.28%	253	0.46%	614	1.13%	-610	-1.12%	54,660
Clermont	14,850	42.38%	19,616	55.99%	335	0.96%	125	0.36%	51	0.15%	-4,766	-13.61%	35,037
Clinton	4,959	42.25%	6,597	56.21%	115	0.98%	25	0.21%	28	0.24%	-1,638	-13.96%	11,737
Columbiana	23,096	49.81%	22,318	48.13%	606	1.31%	221	0.48%	70	0.15%	778	1.68%	46,367
Coshocton	5,827	46.63%	6,361	50.90%	143	1.15%	51	0.41%	97	0.78%	-534	-4.27%	12,496
Crawford	7,553	40.03%	10,801	57.24%	311	1.65%	153	0.81%	19	0.10%	-3,248	-17.21%	18,870
Cuyahoga	349,186	56.03%	255,594	41.01%	10,854	1.75%	2,270	0.37%	3,741	0.60%	93,592	15.02%	623,222
Darke	9,901	45.10%	11,580	52.75%	250	1.14%	136	0.62%	57	0.26%	-1,679	-7.65%	21,953
Defiance	5,850	42.77%	7,526	55.02%	188	1.38%	63	0.46%	29	0.21%	-1,676	-12.25%	13,679
Delaware	7,058	35.55%	12,285	61.88%	323	1.63%	121	0.61%	19	0.10%	-5,227	-26.33%	19,853
Erie	13,843	46.96%	14,742	50.01%	472	1.61%	229	0.78%	108	0.37%	-899	-3.05%	29,478
Fairfield	13,361	40.39%	19,098	57.73%	334	1.01%	169	0.51%	58	0.18%	-5,737	-17.34%	33,079
Fayette	4,477	43.20%	5,719	55.18%	76	0.73%	64	0.62%	13	0.13%	-1,242	-11.98%	10,364
Franklin	141,624	41.57%	189,645	55.66%	6,062	1.78%	1,187	0.35%	1,161	0.34%	-48,021	-14.09%	340,712
Fulton	4,850	37.45%	7,891	60.94%	167	1.29%	24	0.19%	7	0.05%	-3,041	-23.49%	12,949
Gallia	4,971	48.18%	5,198	50.38%	91	0.88%	36	0.35%	15	0.15%	-227	-2.20%	10,317
Geauga	10,449	39.78%	15,004	57.12%	424	1.62%	183	0.70%	121	0.46%	-4,555	-17.34%	26,269
Greene	20,245	45.93%	22,598	51.27%	716	1.63%	124	0.28%	302	0.69%	-2,353	-5.34%	44,077
Guernsey	7,573	48.78%	7,746	49.90%	129	0.83%	40	0.26%	20	0.13%	-173	-1.12%	15,524
Hamilton	135,605	38.41%	211,267	59.84%	3,930	1.11%	931	0.26%	776	0.22%	-75,662	-21.43%	353,079
Hancock	8,548	33.74%	15,983	63.09%	328	1.30%	170	0.67%	219	0.87%	-7,435	-29.35%	25,333
Hardin	4,650	41.99%	6,076	54.86%	134	1.21%	61	0.55%	124	1.12%	-1,426	-12.87%	11,075
Harrison	4,070	52.99%	3,509	45.68%	68	0.89%	16	0.21%	12	0.16%	561	7.31%	7,681
Henry	4,592	36.82%	7,656	61.40%	156	1.25%	31	0.25%	19	0.15%	-3,064	-24.58%	12,470
Highland	6,327	47.46%	6,853	51.41%	99	0.74%	24	0.18%	14	0.11%	-526	-3.95%	13,331
Hocking	5,126	54.56%	4,114	43.78%	118	1.26%	16	0.17%	12	0.13%	1,012	10.78%	9,396
Holmes	2,242	42.31%	2,870	54.16%	70	1.32%	23	0.43%	83	1.57%	-628	-11.85%	5,299
Huron	7,742	42.85%	9,386	51.95%	282	1.57%	141	0.78%	465	2.58%	-1,644	-9.10%	18,066
Jackson	6,699	52.25%	5,987	46.69%	80	0.62%	26	0.20%	17	0.13%	712	5.56%	12,822
Jefferson	22,318	59.00%	14,839	39.23%	481	1.27%	74	0.20%	77	0.20%	7,479	19.77%	37,825
Knox	7,361	43.09%	9,290	54.39%	244	1.43%	77	0.45%	70	0.41%	-1,929	-11.30%	17,081
Lake	40,734	51.30%	36,390	45.83%	1,358	1.72%	408	0.52%	291	0.37%	4,344	5.47%	79,408
Lawrence	12,072	52.50%	10,668	46.39%	154	0.67%	54	0.24%	29	0.13%	1,404	6.11%	22,996
Licking	19,247	44.01%	23,518	53.78%	618	1.42%	153	0.35%	106	0.24%	-4,271	-9.77%	43,733
Logan	5,949	38.62%	9,092	59.03%	178	1.16%	116	0.75%	41	0.27%	-3,143	-20.41%	15,402
Lorain	52,387	55.31%	39,459	41.66%	1,631	1.73%	404	0.43%	525	0.56%	12,928	13.65%	94,711
Lucas	103,658	56.36%	76,069	41.36%	2,762	1.51%	455	0.25%	545	0.30%	27,589	15.00%	183,907
Madison	4,885	40.17%	7,074	58.17%	133	1.10%	39	0.32%	12	0.10%	-2,189	-18.00%	12,161
Mahoning	75,837	60.53%	46,314	36.96%	1,362	1.09%	533	0.43%	882	0.71%	29,523	23.57%	125,294
Marion	10,962	44.52%	13,141	53.38%	330	1.34%	84	0.34%	66	0.27%	-2,179	-8.86%	24,620
Medina	16,251	44.83%	19,066	52.60%	623	1.72%	135	0.37%	86	0.24%	-2,815	-7.77%	36,249
Meigs	5,262	50.85%	4,942	47.76%	95	0.92%	30	0.29%	12	0.12%	320	3.09%	10,348
Mercer	6,724	45.28%	7,678	51.71%	248	1.67%	122	0.82%	50	0.34%	-954	-6.43%	14,849
Miami	13,074	40.34%	18,686	57.65%	407	1.26%	95	0.29%	98	0.30%	-5,612	-17.31%	32,413
Monroe	4,296	60.24%	2,728	38.25%	75	1.05%	12	0.17%	16	0.22%	1,568	21.99%	7,132
Montgomery	106,468	50.35%	100,223	47.40%	2,701	1.28%	567	0.27%	955	0.45%	6,245	2.95%	211,436
Morgan	2,727	46.94%	2,971	51.14%	66	1.14%	31	0.53%	8	0.14%	-244	-4.20%	5,809
Morrow	4,870	44.63%	5,814	53.28%	150	1.38%	49	0.45%	11	0.10%	-944	-8.65%	10,912
Muskingum	14,178	47.15%	15,358	51.07%	350	1.16%	119	0.40%	38	0.13%	-1,180	-3.92%	30,070
Noble	2,612	45.58%	3,007	52.48%	68	1.19%	24	0.42%	14	0.24%	-395	-6.90%	5,730
Ottawa	9,646	52.71%	8,241	45.04%	275	1.51%	78	0.43%	22	0.12%	1,405	7.67%	18,299
Paulding	3,229	46.21%	3,593	51.42%	101	1.45%	46	0.66%	11	0.16%	-364	-5.21%	6,987
Perry	6,268	51.64%	5,637	46.44%	135	1.11%	61	0.50%	19	0.16%	631	5.20%	12,138
Pickaway	5,907	42.06%	7,695	54.79%	140	1.00%	65	0.47%	169	1.21%	-1,788	-12.73%	14,045
Pike	5,734	59.89%	3,729	38.95%	68	0.71%	17	0.18%	17	0.18%	2,005	20.94%	9,574
Portage	24,417	55.72%	17,927	40.91%	1,008	2.31%	171	0.39%	184	0.42%	6,490	14.81%	43,824
Preble	5,850	45.89%	6,654	52.20%	132	1.04%	57	0.45%	33	0.26%	-804	-6.31%	12,747
Putnam	5,035	39.61%	7,332	57.69%	256	2.02%	59	0.46%	14	0.11%	-2,297	-18.08%	12,710
Richland	23,065	46.83%	24,310	49.36%	600	1.22%	228	0.46%	898	1.83%	-1,245	-2.53%	49,251
Ross	10,743	47.22%	11,477	50.45%	248	1.09%	77	0.34%	148	0.65%	-734	-3.23%	22,751
Sandusky	11,202	45.05%	13,074	52.58%	436	1.76%	88	0.35%	27	0.11%	-1,872	-7.53%	24,867
Scioto	18,019	57.22%	13,021	41.35%	218	0.69%	111	0.35%	89	0.28%	4,998	15.87%	31,488
Seneca	10,074	44.74%	11,730	52.10%	498	2.22%	140	0.62%	39	0.17%	-1,656	-7.36%	22,516
Shelby	6,414	43.17%	8,011	53.91%	207	1.40%	182	1.23%	20	0.13%	-1,597	-10.74%	14,859
Stark	70,012	48.05%	72,607	49.83%	1,805	1.24%	671	0.46%	336	0.23%	-2,595	-1.78%	145,709
Summit	123,711	59.09%	80,415	38.41%	3,192	1.53%	613	0.29%	1,026	0.49%	43,296	20.68%	209,350
Trumbull	53,828	58.16%	36,469	39.41%	1,068	1.16%	490	0.53%	462	0.50%	17,359	18.75%	92,544
Tuscarawas	16,880	53.01%	14,279	44.84%	429	1.35%	149	0.47%	50	0.16%	2,601	8.17%	31,841
Union	4,377	36.34%	7,464	61.98%	117	0.97%	52	0.43%	13	0.11%	-3,087	-25.64%	12,043
Van Wert	5,689	39.83%	8,344	58.42%	143	1.00%	64	0.45%	19	0.13%	-2,655	-18.59%	14,284
Vinton	2,629	54.25%	2,148	44.33%	46	0.95%	11	0.23%	10	0.21%	481	9.92%	4,846
Warren	13,349	44.59%	16,115	53.83%	235	0.79%	119	0.40%	74	0.25%	-2,766	-9.24%	29,935
Washington	8,914	42.25%	11,513	54.57%	250	1.19%	89	0.42%	275	1.31%	-2,599	-12.32%	21,096
Wayne	13,087	42.55%	16,976	55.20%	429	1.40%	105	0.34%	103	0.34%	-3,889	-12.65%	30,754
Williams	4,920	38.55%	7,596	59.52%	178	1.40%	34	0.27%	15	0.12%	-2,676	-20.97%	12,762
Wood	16,926	45.58%	19,331	52.06%	649	1.75%	117	0.32%	52	0.14%	-2,405	-6.48%	37,131
Wyandot	4,043	40.65%	5,661	56.92%	174	1.75%	47	0.47%	11	0.11%	-1,618	-16.27%	9,946
Totals	2,011,621	48.92%	2,000,505	48.65%	58,258	1.42%	15,529	0.38%	25,960	0.63%	11,116	0.27%	4,111,873

County Flips: Democratic Hold Gain from Republican / Republican Hold

==== Counties that flipped from Republican to Democratic ====
- Adams
- Ashtabula
- Belmont
- Brown
- Columbiana
- Cuyahoga
- Harrison
- Hocking
- Jackson
- Jefferson
- Lake
- Lawrence
- Lorain
- Mahoning
- Meigs
- Monroe
- Montgomery
- Ottawa
- Perry
- Pike
- Portage
- Scioto
- Summit
- Trumbull
- Tuscarawas
- Vinton

=== By congressional district ===
Despite losing the state, Ford won 14 of the state's 23 congressional districts, including 3 which elected Democrats, while the other 9 districts were won by Carter, including 2 won by Republicans.

District	Carter	Ford	Representative
1st	41.4%	58.6%	Bill Gradison
2nd	37.1%	62.9%	Donald D. Clancy
2nd	37.1%	62.9%	Tom Luken
3rd	51.6%	48.4%	Charles W. Whalen Jr.
4th	40.4%	59.6%	Tennyson Guyer
5th	44.6%	55.4%	Del Latta
6th	48.8%	51.2%	Bill Harsha
7th	46.4%	53.6%	Bud Brown
8th	45.5%	54.5%	Tom Kindness
9th	58.1%	41.9%	Thomas L. Ashley
10th	49%	51%	Clarence E. Miller
11th	52.5%	47.5%	J. William Stanton
12th	44.3%	55.7%	Samuel L. Devine
13th	54.3%	45.7%	Charles Adams Mosher
13th	54.3%	45.7%	Don Pease
14th	62.8%	37.2%	John F. Seiberling
15th	41%	59%	Chalmers Wylie
16th	48.1%	51.9%	Ralph Regula
17th	45.8%	54.2%	John M. Ashbrook
18th	55.2%	44.8%	Wayne Hays
18th	55.2%	44.8%	Douglas Applegate
19th	61.9%	38.1%	Charles J. Carney
20th	62.5%	37.5%	James V. Stanton
20th	62.5%	37.5%	Mary Rose Oakar
21st	85.8%	14.2%	Louis Stokes
22nd	49.8%	50.2%	Charles Vanik
23rd	43.3%	56.7%	Ronald M. Mottl

== See also ==
- United States presidential elections in Ohio
