= Howland =

Howland may refer to:

== Places ==
In the United States:

- Howland, Maine, a New England town
  - Howland (CDP), Maine, the main village in the town
- Howland, Missouri
- Howland Township, Trumbull County, Ohio
  - Howland Center, Ohio, in the township
- Howland Island, an uninhabited coral island that is an unorganized territory of the United States
- Howland Hook Marine Terminal, a container port facility on Staten Island, New York City, United States

== People ==
- Howland J. Hamlin (1850–1909), American lawyer and politician
- Howland (surname)

== Buildings ==
- The Howland Cultural Center in Beacon, New York, named for Joseph Howland

== Awards ==
- Howland Memorial Prize, awarded to a "citizen of any country in recognition of some achievement of marked distinction in the field of literature or fine arts or the science of government"
