= Howlin =

Howlin is a surname. Notable people with the surname include:

- Brendan Howlin (born 1956), Irish politician
- Frank Howlin (born 1966), Irish Gaelic footballer
- Patricia Howlin, English psychiatrist

== See also ==
- Howland (surname)
