= Michael A. Sweeney =

American politician

Michael A. Sweeney was an American lawyer and politician from Cleveland, Ohio who served five terms in the Ohio House of Representatives from 1957 to 1966 (the 102-106th Ohio legislatures) as a Democrat from Cuyahoga County. (He is not to be confused with Mike M. Sweeney, who served from 1951 to 1954 [the 99th and 100th Ohio legislatures] as a Democrat from Cuyahoga County.)

== Background ==
Prior to his 1956 election, he had been an assistant prosecutor.

== Elections ==
Sweeney was first elected to the House in 1956 and re-elected from 1958 through 1966. In 1966, he was encouraged to challenge incumbent Congressman Michael A. Feighan in the Democratic primary election, and came within 473 votes of unseating him in Ohio's 20th congressional district.
