= Senator Mooney =

Senator Mooney may refer to:

- Alex Mooney (born 1971), Maryland State Senate
- Charles A. Mooney (1879–1931), Ohio State Senate
