= Jacob A. Beidler =

American politician (1852–1912)

Jacob Beidler
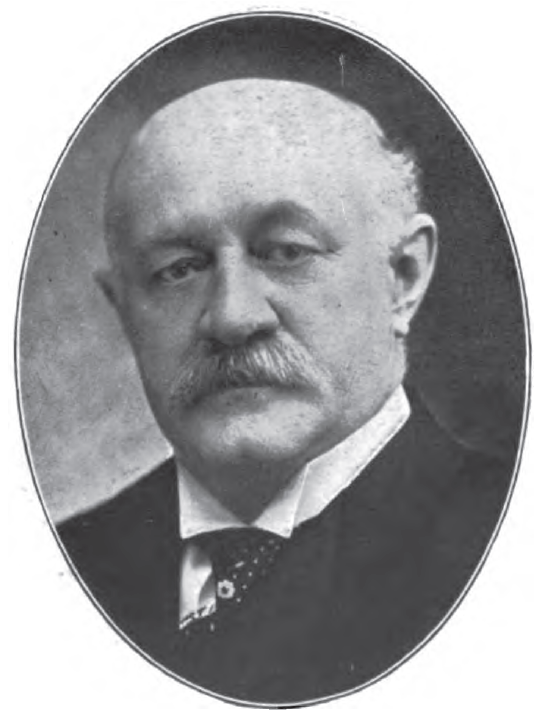

Member of the U.S. House of Representatives from Ohio's 20th district
- In office March 4, 1901 – March 3, 1907
- Preceded by: Fremont O. Phillips
- Succeeded by: L. Paul Howland

Personal details
- Born: Jacob Atlee Beidler; November 2, 1852 Chester County, Pennsylvania, U.S.
- Died: August 13, 1912 (aged 59) Willoughby, Ohio, U.S.
- Resting place: Lake View Cemetery, Cleveland, Ohio, U.S.
- Party: Republican
- Spouse: Hannah M. Rhoades

Jacob Atlee Beidler (November 2, 1852 – September 13, 1912) was an American businessman and politician who served three terms as a U.S. representative from Ohio from 1901 to 1907.

== Biography ==
Born in Tredyffrin Township, Pennsylvania, Beidler attended the country schools, and Locke's Seminary, Norristown, Pennsylvania. He moved to Ohio and settled in Willoughby in Lake County in 1873.

=== Business career ===
He engaged in business as a coal dealer and later as an operator. Beidler was elected a member of the city council of Willoughby in 1881. He moved to his farm, "Belle Vernon," near Willoughby, in 1881 and engaged in raising dairy cattle. He served as president of the Belle Vernon-Mapes Dairy Co.. He served as vice president of the Cleveland, Painesville & Eastern Railroad Co. Presidential elector in 1896 for McKinley/Hobart.

== Congress ==
Beidler was elected as a Republican to the Fifty-seventh, Fifty-eighth, and Fifty-ninth Congresses (March 4, 1901 – March 3, 1907).

Owing to ill health he declined to be a candidate for renomination in 1906 to the Sixtieth Congress.

== Later career ==
He resumed his former business activities. He served as president of the Rhodes & Beidler Coal Co. He served as member of the State board of agriculture.

== Death ==
He died at "Belle Vernon," near Willoughby, Ohio, September 13, 1912. He was interred in Lake View Cemetery, Cleveland, Ohio.

== Sources ==
- United States Congress. "Jacob A. Beidler (id: B000317)". Biographical Directory of the United States Congress.
- Taylor, William Alexander; Taylor, Aubrey Clarence (1899). Ohio statesmen and annals of progress: from the year 1788 to the year 1900 ... Vol. 2. State of Ohio. p. 136.

U.S. House of Representatives
Preceded by Fremont O. Phillips	Member of the U.S. House of Representatives from Ohio's 20th congressional district 1901-1907	Succeeded by L. Paul Howland
