= Martin L. Sweeney =

American politician (1885–1960)

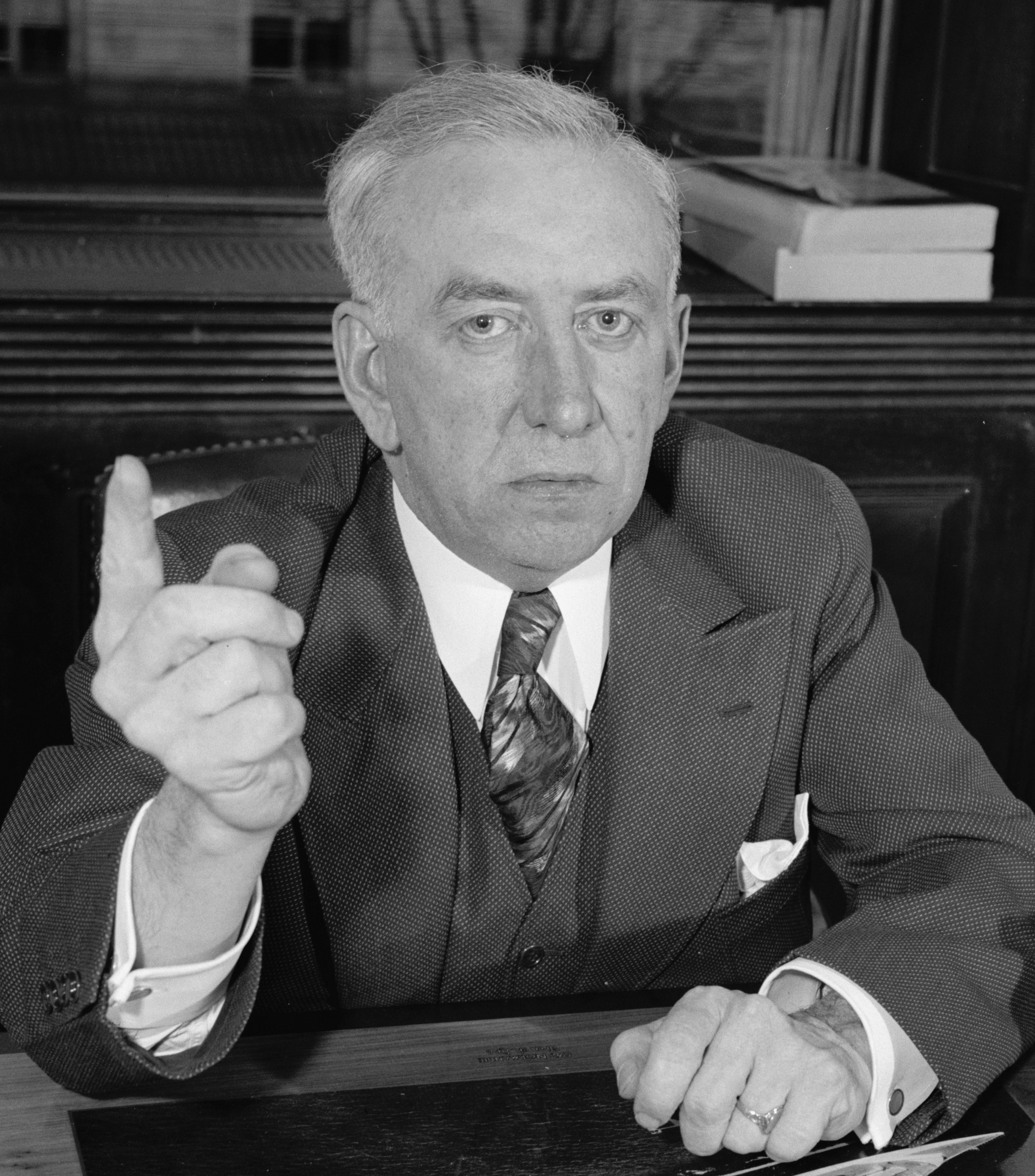
- Sweeney in 1939

Member of the U.S. House of Representatives from Ohio's 20th district
- In office November 3, 1931 – January 3, 1943
- Preceded by: Charles A. Mooney
- Succeeded by: Michael A. Feighan

Personal details
- Born: Martin Leonard Sweeney; April 15, 1885 Cleveland, Ohio, U.S.
- Died: May 1, 1960 (aged 75) Cleveland, Ohio, U.S.
- Resting place: Calvary Cemetery
- Party: Democratic

Martin Leonard Sweeney Sr. (April 15, 1885 – May 1, 1960) was a Democratic U.S. Representative from Ohio and the father of Robert E. Sweeney.

== Biography ==
Born in Cleveland, Ohio, Sweeney attended parochial and public schools in the area, including St. Bridget's Parochial School. Prior to his political career, Sweeney worked as a laborer, hoisting engineer and a salesman from 1901 to 1913. He served as a member of the State House of Representatives in 1913 and 1914 and graduated from the Cleveland Law School of Baldwin-Wallace College in 1914. Sweeney was admitted to the bar that same year and begin practicing law in Cleveland. From 1924 to 1932 Sweeney was judge of the municipal court of Cleveland, where he vocally opposed Prohibition. Sweeney also served as a delegate to the Democratic National Convention in 1932.

From 1927 to 1931, Sweeney was national president of the Ancient Order of Hibernians.

Sweeney was elected as a Democrat to the Seventy-second Congress to fill the vacancy caused by the death of Charles A. Mooney. He was re-elected to the Seventy-third and the four succeeding Congresses, serving from November 3, 1931, to January 3, 1943. Although Sweeney initially supported President Franklin D. Roosevelt, he later turned against Roosevelt and sided with antisemitic priest and social justice activist Charles Coughlin. Sweeney's re-elections in 1934 and 1936 without support from the national Democratic Party led him to continue his independent congressional course in an increasing swing towards non-interventionist politics.

In September 1939, syndicated columnists Drew Pearson and Robert S. Allen accused Sweeney of antisemitism, reporting that he had opposed the appointment of foreign-born Jews to the Cleveland federal bench. They also labeled Sweeney as the "Congressional spokesman for Father Coughlin." Sweeney filed 70 libel suits against Pearson and Allen, as well as the papers that carried his column, demanding $250,000 from each. Each of the cases was dismissed.

In the summer of 1940, a bill establishing a peacetime military draft, H.R. 10132, was introduced. Sweeney denounced the bill as an attempt to drag America into World War II on the side of Great Britain. Beverly Vincent (D-KY) said Sweeney was a traitor and a "son of a bitch." Sweeney swung at Vincent, who counterpunched with a hard right to Sweeney's head. The House doorkeeper called it the best fistfight he had witnessed in the House in his fifty years at his post.

Sweeney was an unsuccessful candidate for re-nomination in 1942 after being targeted for his stand against British Lend Lease and his alleged isolationism. He was defeated in the primary by Michael A. Feighan, who represented Cleveland in Congress for the next twenty-eight years.

He was unsuccessful for the Democratic nomination for mayor of Cleveland in 1933 and in 1941, and for the gubernatorial nomination in 1944. He practiced law in Cleveland until his death there on May 1, 1960. He was interred in Calvary Cemetery.

== Family ==
His daughter was married to the son of Cuyahoga County Sheriff Martin O'Donnell (1886–1941).

His first cousin was Dr. Francis E. Sweeney (1894–1964), the prime suspect in the Cleveland Torso Murders (1934–1938).

== Sources ==
- United States Congress. "Martin L. Sweeney (id: S001102)". Biographical Directory of the United States Congress.

U.S. House of Representatives
Preceded by Charles A. Mooney	Member of the U.S. House of Representatives from Ohio's 20th congressional district 1931–1943	Succeeded by Michael A. Feighan
