= Michael A. Feighan =

American politician

Michael Aloysius Feighan
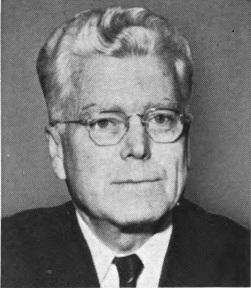

Member of the U.S. House of Representatives from Ohio's 20th district
- In office January 3, 1943 – January 3, 1971
- Preceded by: Martin L. Sweeney
- Succeeded by: James V. Stanton

Member of the Ohio House of Representatives
- In office 1937-1940

Personal details
- Born: February 16, 1905 Lakewood, Ohio, U.S.
- Died: March 19, 1992 (aged 87) Washington, D.C., U.S.
- Party: Democratic
- Spouse: Florence Feighan
- Relations: Ed Feighan (nephew)
- Children: Michael Feighan Jr. William Feighan Fleur Feighan
- Education: John Carroll University; Princeton University; Harvard Law School

Michael Aloysius Feighan (February 16, 1905 – March 19, 1992) was an American politician from Lakewood, Ohio, near Cleveland. He served as a member of the Ohio House of Representatives, and as a Democratic Party U.S. Representative from 1943 to 1971, serving Ohio's 20th congressional district.

Originally, he was recruited by national Democrats who wanted to replace Congressman Martin L. Sweeney (D-OH), who had for eleven years held the seat representing the west side of Cleveland. They considered Sweeney to be too isolationist; for example, he had argued against enacting Lend-Lease to the United Kingdom.

After Feighan had served almost three decades in the House of Representatives, some local Democratic officials, led by Cleveland City Council President James V. Stanton, had grown tired of his leadership. Sensing that they could not beat Feighan in one election, they set up a stalking horse running Michael A. Sweeney, a local lawyer with a good political name. Sweeney lost, but his vote total showed that Feighan could be vulnerable in a rematch. Four years later, in 1970, Stanton himself ran and defeated Feighan in the Democratic primary, concluding Feighan's political career.

During the legislation of the Immigration and Nationality Act of 1965 Feighan insisted that "family unification" should take priority in immigration policy over "employability", on the premise that such a weighting would maintain the existing ethnic profile of the country. That change instead resulted in chain migration dominating the subsequent patterns of immigration to the United States and consequently a more ethnically diverse population.

== Electoral history ==
Ohio's 20th congressional district: Results 1942–1968
Year	Democrat	Votes	Pct	Republican	Votes	Pct	3rd Party	Party	Votes	Pct
1942	Michael A. Feighan	34,462	61.81%	Harry T. Marshall	14,001	25.11%	Marie R. Sweeney	Independent	7,289	13.07%
1944	Michael A. Feighan	75,218	75.85%	A. R. McNamara	23,945	24.15%				
1946	Michael A. Feighan	49,670	66.99%	Walter E. Obert	24,476	33.01%				
1948	Michael A. Feighan	64,241	100%	no candidate						
1950	Michael A. Feighan	60,565	74.21%	Paul W. Cassidy	21,044	25.79%				
1952	Michael A. Feighan	109,211	65.21%	John H. Ferguson	58,271	34.79%				
1954	Michael A. Feighan	81,304	67.66%	John H. Ferguson	38,865	32.34%				
1956	Michael A. Feighan	105,562	65.25%	John H. Ferguson	56,209	34.75%				
1958	Michael A. Feighan	113,200	79.43%	Malvern E. Schultz	29,308	20.57%				
1960	Michael A. Feighan	113,302	67.79%	Leonard G. Richter	53,845	32.21%				
1962	Michael A. Feighan	91,544	71.04%	Leonard G. Richter	37,325	28.96%				
1964	Michael A. Feighan	115,675	74.43%	Joseph A. Cipollone	39,747	25.57%				
1966	Michael A. Feighan	63,629	76.05%	Clarence E. McLeod	20,034	23.95%				
1968	Michael A. Feighan	72,918	72.38%	J. William Petro	27,827	27.62%				

== See also ==
U.S. House of Representatives
Preceded by Martin L. Sweeney	Member of the U.S. House of Representatives from Ohio's 20th congressional district 1943 – 1971	Succeeded by James V. Stanton
