= Miner G. Norton =

American politician

Miner Gibbs Norton
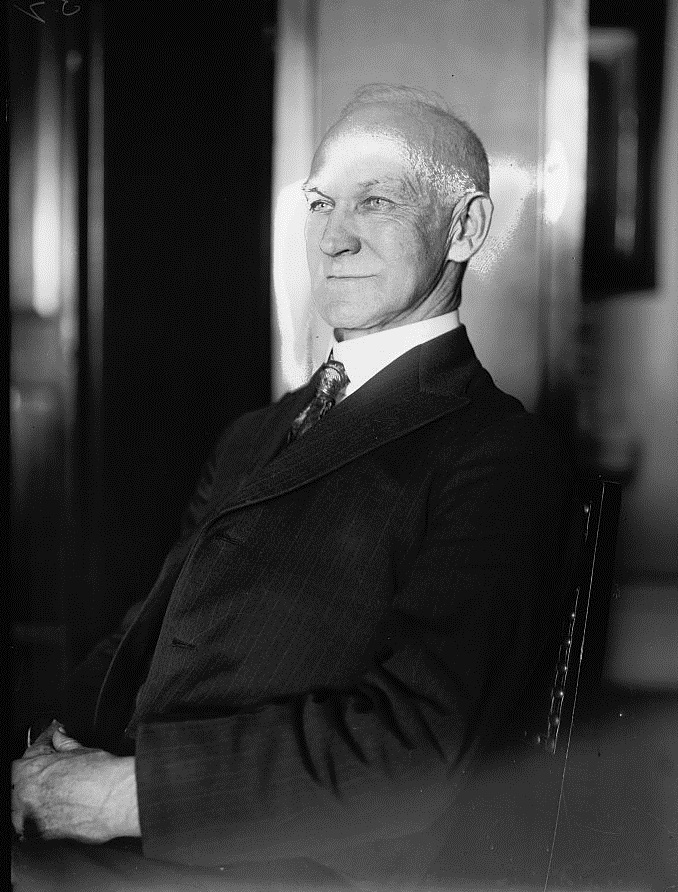

Member of the U.S. House of Representatives from Ohio's 20th district
- In office March 4, 1921 – March 3, 1923
- Preceded by: Charles A. Mooney
- Succeeded by: Charles A. Mooney

Personal details
- Born: May 11, 1857 Andover, Ohio, U.S.
- Died: September 7, 1926 (aged 69) Cleveland, Ohio, U.S.
- Resting place: Oakdale Cemetery, Jefferson, Ohio
- Party: Republican
- Education: National Normal University; Baldwin-Wallace College; Mount Union College; Yale Law School

Miner Gibbs Norton (May 11, 1857 – September 7, 1926) was an American lawyer and politician who served one term as a U.S. representative from Ohio from 1921 to 1923

== Biography ==
Born in Andover, Ohio, Norton attended the public schools, the National Normal University, Lebanon, Ohio, and Baldwin-Wallace College, Berea, Ohio. He graduated from Mount Union College, Alliance, Ohio, in 1878 and from the law department of Yale College in 1880. He was admitted to the bar in the latter year and commenced practice in Cleveland, Ohio. He served as director of law of Cleveland, Ohio 1895-1899. He served as chairman of the Republican State executive committee in the early nineties. United States appraiser for the northern district of Ohio 1905-1909.

=== Congress ===
Norton was elected as a Republican to the Sixty-seventh Congress (March 4, 1921 – March 3, 1923). He was an unsuccessful candidate for reelection in 1922 to the Sixty-eighth Congress.

=== Later career and death ===
He resumed the practice of law in Cleveland. He was appointed by President Coolidge collector of customs at Cleveland on February 7, 1925, and served until his death in Cleveland, Ohio, September 7, 1926. He was interred in Oakdale Cemetery, Jefferson, Ohio.

== Sources ==
- United States Congress. "Miner G. Norton (id: N000154)". Biographical Directory of the United States Congress.

U.S. House of Representatives
| Preceded by Charles A. Mooney | Member of the U.S. House of Representatives from Ohio's 20th congressional district 1921-1923 | Succeeded by Charles A. Mooney |
