= Clifton B. Beach =

American politician

Clifton Bailey Beach
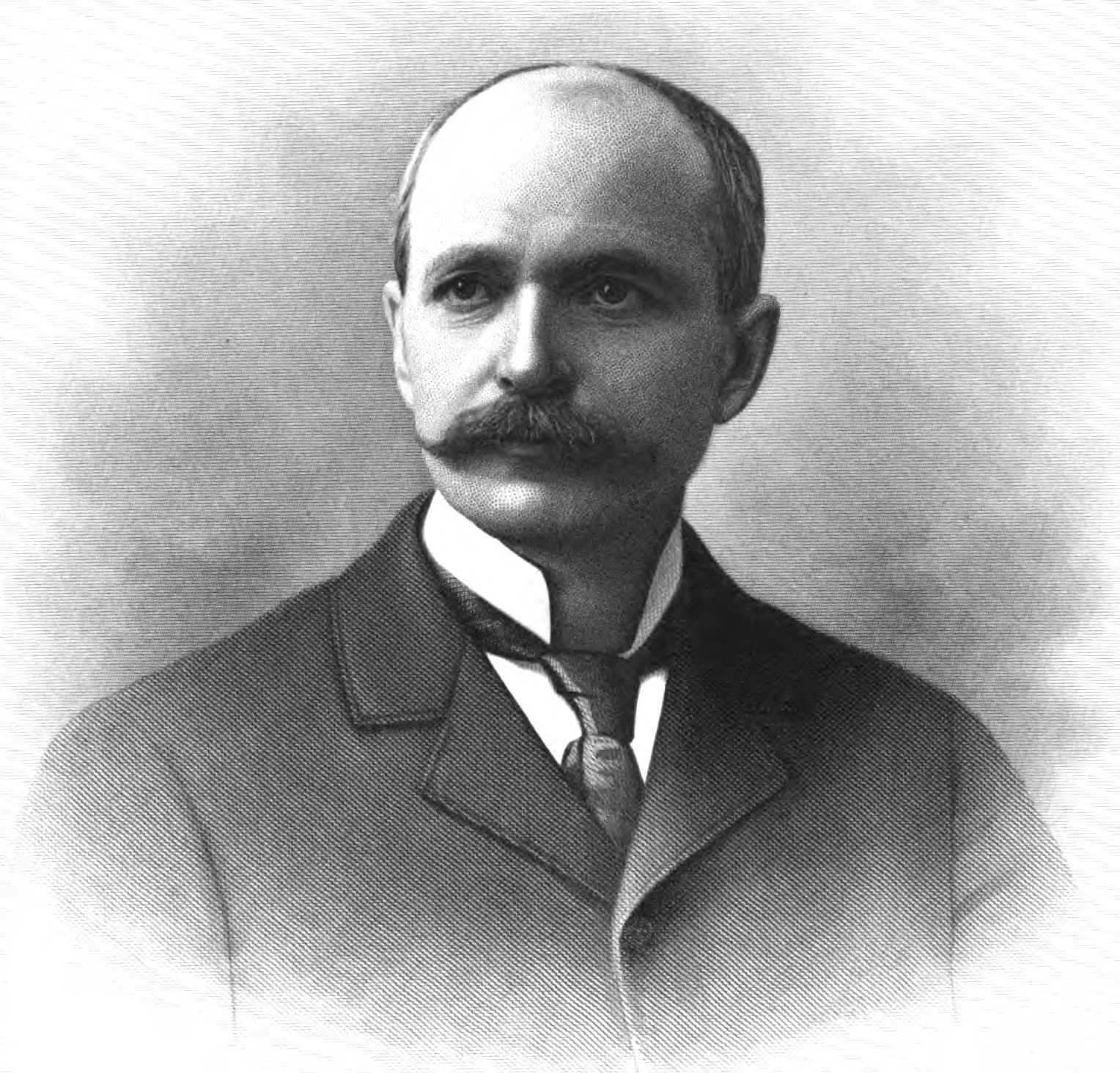

Member of the U.S. House of Representatives from Ohio's 20th district
- In office March 4, 1895 – March 3, 1899
- Preceded by: William J. White
- Succeeded by: Fremont O. Phillips

Personal details
- Born: September 16, 1845 Sharon, Ohio, U.S.
- Died: November 15, 1902 (aged 57) Rocky River, Ohio, U.S.
- Resting place: Lake View Cemetery, Cleveland, Ohio, U.S.
- Party: Republican
- Education: Western Reserve College
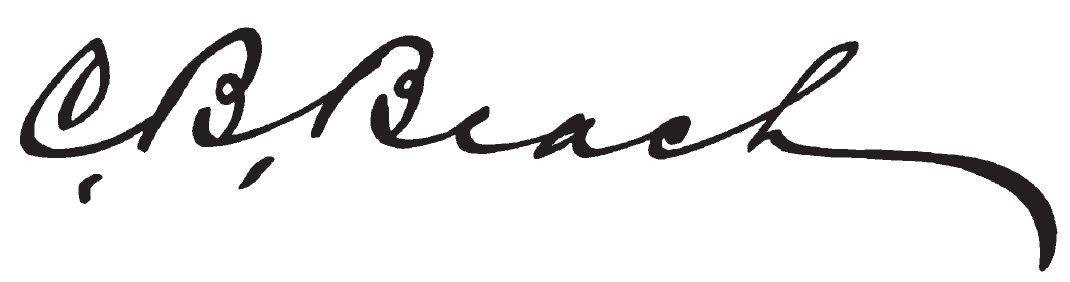
- Signature

Clifton Bailey Beach (September 16, 1845 – November 15, 1902) was an American lawyer and politician who served two terms as a U.S. representative from Ohio from 1895 to 1899.

== Biography ==
Born in Sharon Township, Medina County, Ohio, Beach moved to Cleveland with his parents in 1857. He attended the common schools and was graduated from Western Reserve College in Hudson, Ohio, known now as Case Western Reserve University, in 1871. He studied law. He was admitted to the bar in 1872 and commenced practice in Cleveland. He served as deputy collector of customs at Cleveland. He retired from the practice of law in 1884 and engaged in the manufacture of wire nails, staples, and rods.

Beach was elected as a Republican to the Fifty-fourth and Fifty-fifth Congresses (March 4, 1895 – March 3, 1899). He was not a candidate for renomination in 1898. He resumed his former manufacturing pursuits in Cleveland. He died at Rocky River, Ohio, November 15, 1902. He was interred in Lake View Cemetery, Cleveland, Ohio.

== Sources ==
- United States Congress. "Clifton B. Beach (id: B000262)". Biographical Directory of the United States Congress.

U.S. House of Representatives
Preceded by William J. White	Member of the U.S. House of Representatives from Ohio's 20th congressional district 1895–1899	Succeeded by Fremont O. Phillips
