= Vincent A. Taylor =

American politician

Vincent Albert Taylor
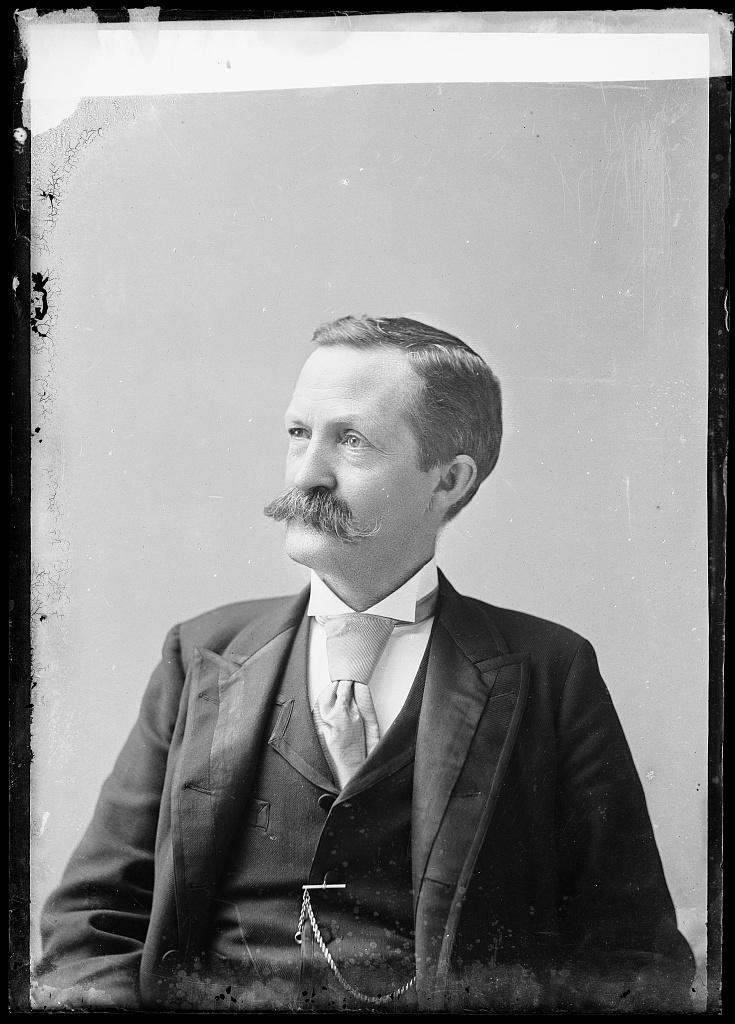
- Vincent Albert Taylor photographed by C. M. Bell Studio

Member of the U.S. House of Representatives from Ohio's 20th district
- In office March 4, 1891 – March 3, 1893
- Preceded by: Martin L. Smyser
- Succeeded by: William J. White

Member of the Ohio Senate from the 25th district
- In office January 2, 1888 – January 5, 1890 Serving with David Morrison
- Preceded by: George H. Ely, F. H. Eggers
- Succeeded by: Charles Herman, David Morrison

Personal details
- Born: December 6, 1845 Bedford, Ohio, U.S.
- Died: December 2, 1922 (aged 76) Bedford, Ohio, U.S.
- Resting place: Bedford Cemetery
- Party: Republican

Vincent Albert Taylor (December 6, 1845 – December 2, 1922) was a soldier, businessman, and single-term U.S. Representative from Ohio from 1891 to 1893.

== Biography ==
Born in Bedford, Ohio, Taylor attended the common schools.

=== Civil War ===
During the American Civil War, he enlisted in May 1864 in Company H, One Hundred and Fiftieth Regiment, Ohio Volunteer Infantry, a Hundred Days Regiment. In August of the same year, he enrolled in Company H, One Hundred and Seventy-seventh Regiment, Ohio Volunteer Infantry and served until the close of the war.

After mustering out of the service, he returned to Bedford and engaged in manufacturing pursuits. He served as member of the Ohio Senate 1888-1890.

=== Congress ===
Taylor was elected as a Republican to the Fifty-second Congress (March 4, 1891 – March 3, 1893). He was not a candidate for renomination in 1892.

=== Later career and death ===
He served as president of the Taylor Chair Company in Bedford until his death there December 2, 1922. Taylor was interred in Bedford Cemetery.

U.S. House of Representatives
Preceded by Martin L. Smyser	Member of the U.S. House of Representatives from Ohio's 20th congressional district 1891–1893	Succeeded by William J. White
