= William J. White (politician) =

American politician

William John White
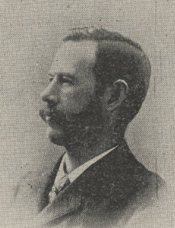

Member of the U.S. House of Representatives from Ohio's 20th district
- In office March 4, 1893 – March 3, 1895
- Preceded by: Vincent A. Taylor
- Succeeded by: Clifton B. Beach

Personal details
- Born: October 7, 1850 Rice Lake, Canada West, Province of Canada (now Ontario)
- Died: February 16, 1923 (aged 72) Cleveland, Ohio, U.S.
- Resting place: Lake View Cemetery, Cleveland
- Party: Republican

William John White (October 7, 1850 – February 16, 1923) was an American businessman and politician who served one term as a U.S. representative from Ohio from 1893 to 1895.

== Early life and career ==
Born at Rice Lake, Ontario, Canada, White moved to the United States in 1857 with his parents, who settled in Cleveland, Ohio. He attended the district schools. He entered business as a candy maker in 1869, and later began the manufacture of chewing gum. He served as mayor of West Cleveland in 1889.

His wife, Ellen Maria Mansfield, was born in Cleveland, Ohio, and was the daughter of Orange and Marietta Mansfield. They had several children. and were later divorced.

== Congress ==
White was elected as a Republican to the Fifty-third Congress (March 4, 1893 – March 3, 1895). He declined to be a candidate for renomination in 1894.

== Later career and death ==
He was first president of the American Chicle Co. and later president of the W. J. White Chicle Co. He died in Cleveland on February 16, 1923. White was interred in Lake View Cemetery.

== Sources ==
- United States Congress. "William J. White (id: W000398)". Biographical Directory of the United States Congress.

U.S. House of Representatives
Preceded by Vincent A. Taylor	Member of the U.S. House of Representatives from Ohio's 20th congressional district 1893–1895	Succeeded by Clifton B. Beach
