= Esther Allen Howland =

- Born: Esther Allen; July 13, 1801; Plymouth, Massachusetts
- Died: April 14, 1860 (aged 58); Worcester, Massachusetts
- Occupation: Writer
- Spouse: Southworth Allen Howland
- Children: Esther Allen Howland; Charles, Edward, William
- Parent(s): William Allen; Betsey Barnes Allen

Esther Allen Howland (1801–1860) was the Massachusetts writer of The New England Economical Housekeeper, and Family Receipt Book. The regional cookbook contained recipes, money-saving advice and medical remedies. First published in 1844 by her husband, the book was enlarged and remained in print into the 1870s.

== Biography ==
Howland was born July 13, 1801, in Plymouth, Massachusetts, the daughter of William and Betsey Barnes Allen. In 1823 she married Southworth Allen Howland (1800-1882) who became a publisher and ran a large book and stationer's store in Worcester, Massachusetts. One of their four surviving children, Esther Allen Howland (1828–1904), was known for introducing European-style greeting cards to the American Valentine's Day card market and developing a successful business. Howland died in Worcester on April 14, 1860.

== Cookbook ==
The New England Economical Housekeeper, and Family Receipt Book was an instant success, with 1500 copies sold during its first fifteen weeks in 1844. Howland added about twenty recipes increasing its eighty-eight pages to one hundred and eight in the 1845 edition. The book was printed yearly, although the title was changed to The American Economical Housekeeper, and Family Receipt Book in 1849. S. A. Howland stopped publishing the book after ten years, but other companies had been printing copies, as early as 1845, in Cincinnati, Boston, Rochester and other cities; and it would continue in print using either of the titles through the 1870s. Shortly after Howland died, a reworking of her book came out under her name entitled Practical Cook Book and Economical Housekeeper's Guide.

The recipes in the regional cookbook included the New England favorites chowder, salt cod, Johnny-Cake and a fruited Boston pudding. Although wedding cakes and other specialty dishes were included, frugality was present in her choice of recipes, ingredients and advice. Howland included cost-cutting suggestions from Thomas Jefferson and Eliza Leslie that are still relevant. She attributed the following saying to Jefferson: “Never buy what you do not want because it is cheap.” Furthermore, she included what Leslie had suggested: to keep a few tools in the house for repairs so as not to be dependent upon a mechanic (repairman). A large section is devoted to medical advice and recipes, including a description of CPR using a bellows and applying pressure to the chest.

== Works ==
- The New England Economical Housekeeper, and Family Receipt Book. Worcester: S. A. Howland, 1844
- The New England Economical Housekeeper, and Family Receipt Book. Cincinnati: H.W. Derby, 1845
- American Economical Housekeeper, and Family Receipt Book. Worcester: S.A. Howland, 1850
- The Practical Cook Book and Economical Housekeeper's Guide. Boston: Roberts Bros., 1865
