= First Universalist Church (Providence, Rhode Island) =

Historic church in Rhode Island, United States

- U.S. National Register of Historic Places
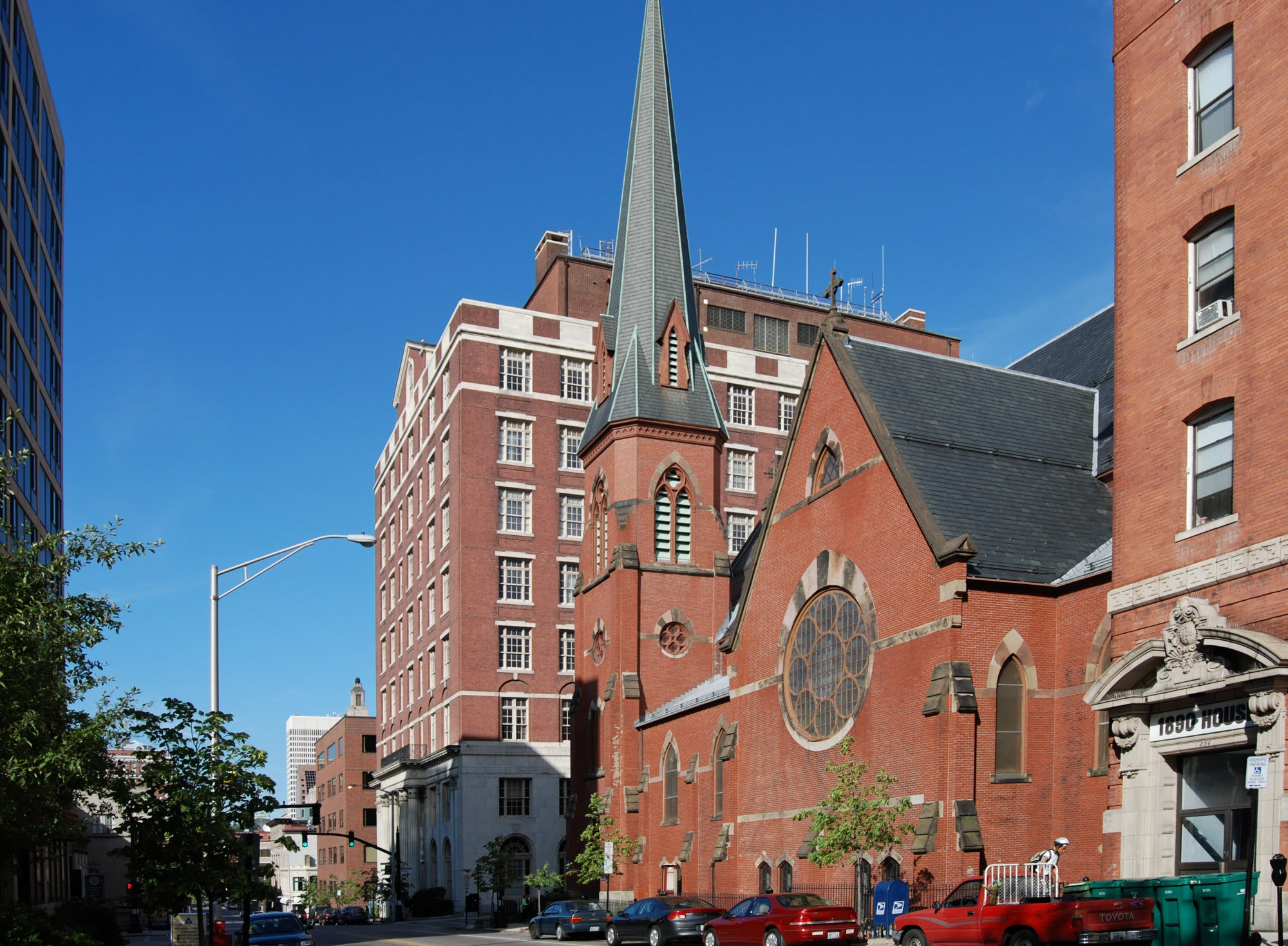

- Location within Rhode Island Location within the United States
- Location: Providence, Rhode Island
- Coordinates: 41°49′15″N 71°25′4″W
- Built: 1872
- Architect: Edwin L. Howland
- Architectural style: High Victorian Gothic
- NRHP reference No.: 77000026
- Added to NRHP: August 16, 1977

The First Universalist Church is a historic church at 250 Washington Street in Providence, Rhode Island.

The brick Gothic church was designed by Edwin L. Howland, a prominent local architect, and built in 1871–72. It is the third sanctuary for a congregation that was founded in 1821 through the efforts of Reverend John Murray, "the founder of American Universalism". It is one of the few remaining church buildings in central Providence, an area that once housed a large number of churches.

The church building was listed on the National Register of Historic Places in 1977.

== See also ==
- National Register of Historic Places listings in Providence, Rhode Island
