= Fremont O. Phillips =

American politician

Fremont Orestes Phillips
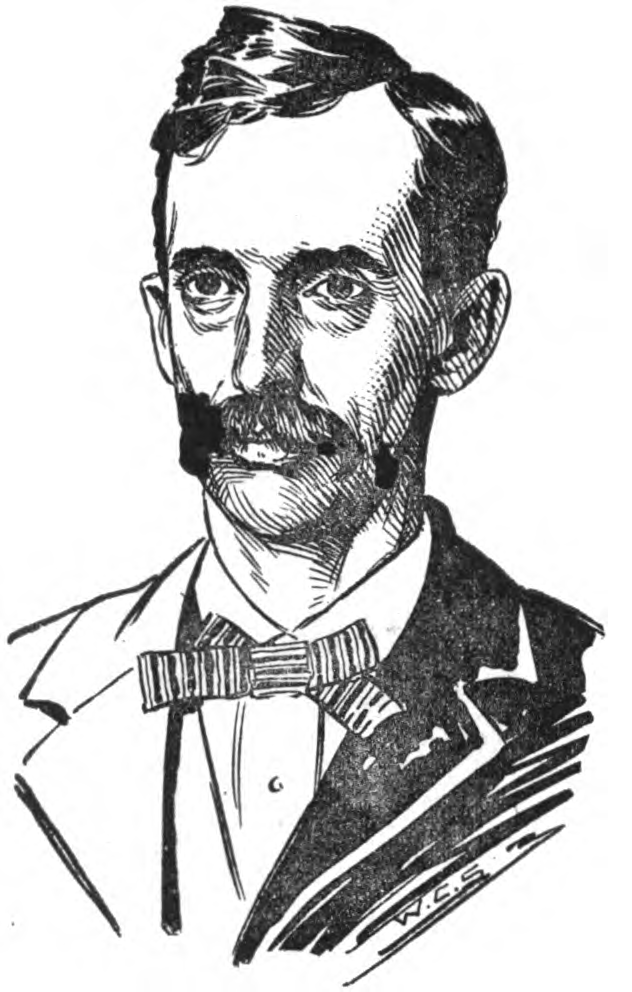

Member of the U.S. House of Representatives from Ohio's 20th district
- In office March 4, 1899 – March 3, 1901
- Preceded by: Clifton B. Beach
- Succeeded by: Jacob A. Beidler

Personal details
- Born: Fremont Orestes Phillips; March 16, 1856 Lafayette, Ohio, U.S.
- Died: February 21, 1936 (aged 79) Medina, Ohio, U.S.
- Resting place: Spring Grove Cemetery, Medina
- Party: Republican
- Education: Kenyon College

Fremont Orestes Phillips (March 16, 1856 – February 21, 1936) was an American lawyer and politician who served as a U.S. representative from Ohio for one term from 1899 to 1901.

== Biography ==
Born in Lafayette, Ohio, Phillips attended the public schools. He moved to Medina, Ohio, in 1873. He attended Medina High School, Medina Normal School both in Medina and Kenyon College in Gambier, Ohio. He studied law.

=== Early career ===
He was admitted to the bar in 1880 and commenced practice in Medina, Ohio. He was also a Justice of the Peace. He served as mayor of Medina from 1886 to 1890 and as probate judge of Medina County from 1892 to 1897.

=== Congress ===
Phillips was elected as a Republican to the Fifty-sixth Congress (March 4, 1899 – March 3, 1901).

He was an unsuccessful candidate for renomination in 1900.

=== Later career ===
He resumed the practice of law in Medina, Ohio. He served as chairman of the Medina County Republican Central committee from 1916 to 1934.

Phillips was again elected probate judge of Medina County in 1924. He was reelected in 1928 and served until 1932.

=== Death and burial ===
He died in Medina, Ohio, February 21, 1936 and was interred in Spring Grove Cemetery.

== Sources ==
- United States Congress. "Fremont O. Phillips (id: P000307)". Biographical Directory of the United States Congress.

U.S. House of Representatives
Preceded by Clifton B. Beach	Member of the U.S. House of Representatives from Ohio's 20th congressional district 1899–1901	Succeeded by Jacob A. Beidler
