= William Gordon (Ohio politician) =

American politician (1862–1942)

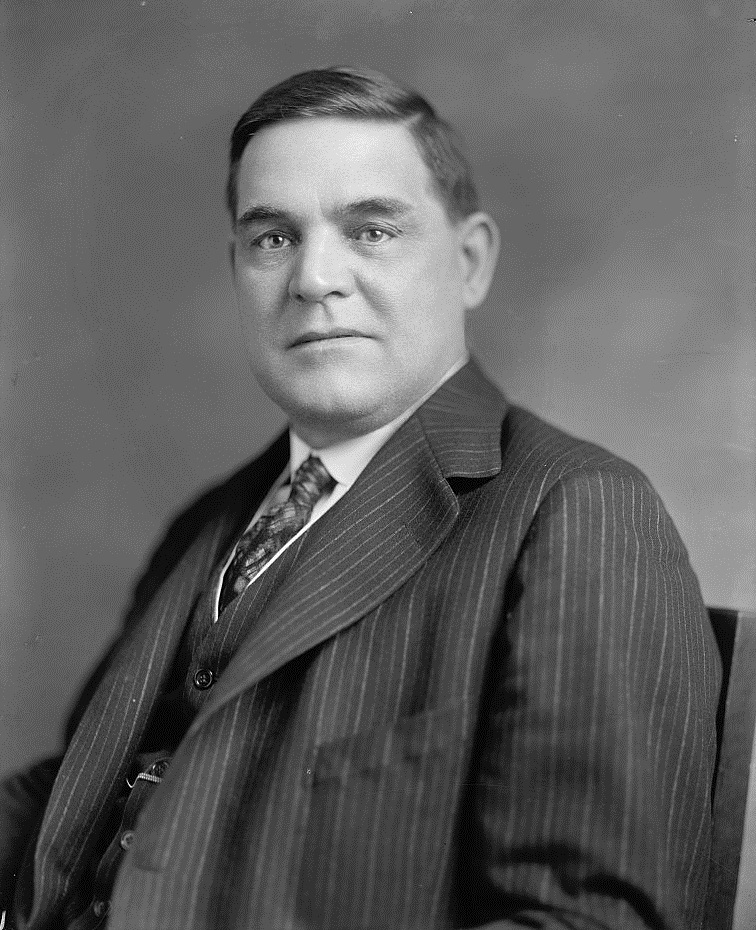

Member of the U.S. House of Representatives from Ohio's 20th district
- In office March 4, 1913 – March 3, 1919
- Preceded by: L. Paul Howland
- Succeeded by: Charles A. Mooney

Personal details
- Born: December 15, 1862 Oak Harbor, Ohio, U.S.
- Died: January 16, 1942 (aged 79) Cleveland, Ohio, U.S.
- Resting place: Oak Harbor Cemetery
- Party: Democratic
- Spouse: Elizabeth Gernhard
- Children: two
- Education: University of Michigan Law School

William Gordon (December 15, 1862 – January 16, 1942) was a lawyer, politician, businessman, and three-term U.S. Representative from Ohio from 1913 to 1919.

== Biography ==
Gordon was born on a farm near Oak Harbor in Ottawa County, Ohio. He attended the public schools and Toledo (Ohio) Business College and then taught school. Entering politics, he was the deputy county treasurer from 1887 to 1889 and a member of the board of school examiners of Ottawa County 1890–1896.

He graduated from the law department of the University of Michigan at Ann Arbor in 1893. Gordon was admitted to the bar the same year and commenced practice in Oak Harbor. He was the prosecuting attorney for Ottawa County from 1895 to 1901 and a delegate to the Democratic National Convention in 1896. He was a member of the Democratic State committee in 1903 and 1904.

=== Congress ===
Entering private business, he founded the Gordon Lumber Company. In 1906, he moved to Cleveland, Ohio, and reentered politics shortly afterward. Gordon was an unsuccessful candidate for election in 1910 to the Sixty-second Congress but was elected as a Democrat to the Sixty-third, Sixty-fourth, and Sixty-fifth Congresses (March 4, 1913 – March 3, 1919). He was an unsuccessful candidate for reelection in 1918 to the Sixty-sixth Congress. Washington Gordon founded The Gordon Lumber Company.

=== Private life ===
Gordon reengaged in the practice of law until his death in Cleveland in 1942. He was interred in Oak Harbor Cemetery, Oak Harbor, Ohio.

Gordon was married September 12, 1893 to Elizabeth Gernhard, daughter of the sheriff of Ottawa County. They had two children.

Gordon was Knights Templar. He resigned from the Knights Templar in the late 1920s over their anti-Catholic stance versus Democratic presidential candidate Al Smith.

== Notes ==
U.S. House of Representatives
Preceded by L. Paul Howland	Member of the U.S. House of Representatives from Ohio's 20th congressional district 1913-1919	Succeeded by Charles A. Mooney
