= Howland, Missouri =

Unincorporated community in Missouri, United States

Coordinates: 40°32′05″N 92°57′27″W

Howland is an extinct town in Putnam County, in the U.S. state of Missouri. The GNIS classifies it as a populated place.

Howland was platted in 1873. A post office called Howland was established in 1873, and remained in operation until 1932. It is unknown why the name "Howland" was applied to this community.
