= L. Paul Howland =

American politician (1865–1942)

Leonard Paul Howland
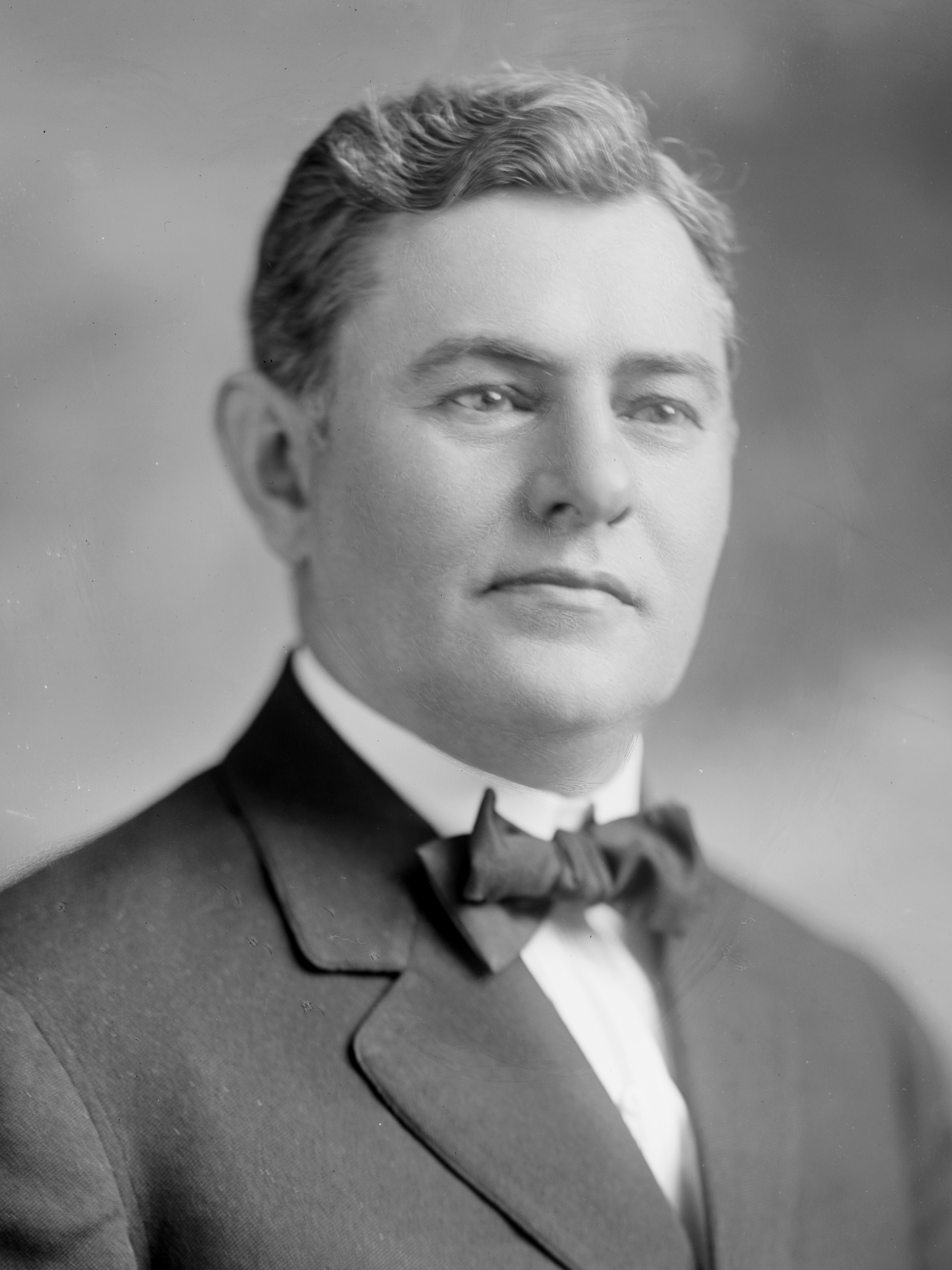

Member of the U.S. House of Representatives from Ohio's 20th district
- In office March 4, 1907 – March 3, 1913
- Preceded by: Jacob A. Beidler
- Succeeded by: William Gordon

Personal details
- Born: December 5, 1865 Jefferson, Ohio, U.S.
- Died: December 23, 1942 (aged 77) Cleveland, Ohio, U.S.
- Resting place: Lake View Cemetery, Cleveland, Ohio, U.S.
- Party: Republican

Leonard Paul Howland (December 5, 1865 – December 23, 1942) was an American lawyer and politician who served three terms as a U.S. representative from Ohio from 1907 to 1913.

== Biography ==
Paul Howland was born in Jefferson, Ohio. Howland completed preparatory studies. He graduated from Oberlin College (Ohio) in 1887 and from the law department of Harvard University in 1890. He was admitted to the bar in 1890 and commenced practice in Jefferson, Ohio. He moved to Cleveland in 1894 and continued the practice of law. He served as second lieutenant, squadron adjutant, First Regiment, Ohio Volunteer Cavalry, during the Spanish–American War.

=== Congress ===
Howland was elected as a Republican to the Sixtieth, Sixty-first, and Sixty-second Congresses (March 4, 1907 – March 3, 1913). He was an unsuccessful candidate for reelection in 1912 to the Sixty-third Congress.

=== Later career ===
He was one of the managers appointed by the House of Representatives in 1912 to conduct the impeachment proceedings against Robert W. Archbald, judge of the United States Commerce Court. He resumed the practice of law. He served as a delegate to the Republican National Conventions in 1916, 1920, and 1924.

=== Death ===
He died in Cleveland, Ohio, December 23, 1942. He was interred in Lake View Cemetery.

== Sources ==
- United States Congress. "L. Paul Howland (id: H000871)". Biographical Directory of the United States Congress.

U.S. House of Representatives
| Preceded by Jacob A. Beidler | Member of the U.S. House of Representatives from Ohio's 20th congressional district 1907–1913 | Succeeded by William Gordon |
