= Charles A. Mooney =

American politician (1879–1931)

Charles Mooney
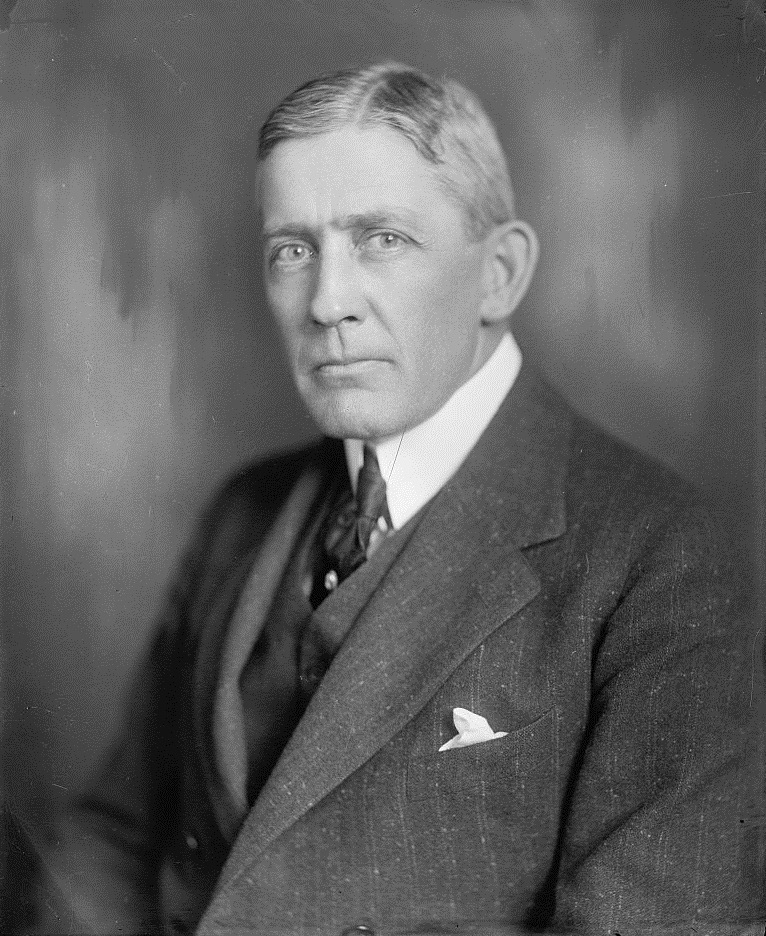

Member of the U.S. House of Representatives from Ohio's 20th district
- In office March 4, 1919 – March 3, 1921
- Preceded by: William Gordon
- Succeeded by: Miner G. Norton
- In office March 4, 1923 – May 29, 1931
- Preceded by: Miner G. Norton
- Succeeded by: Martin L. Sweeney

Member of the Ohio Senate from the 25th district
- In office January 4, 1915 – January 5, 1919 Serving with four others 1915-1917 four others 1917-1919
- Preceded by: four others
- Succeeded by: four others

Personal details
- Born: Charles Anthony Mooney; January 5, 1879 St. Marys, Ohio, U.S.
- Died: May 29, 1931 (aged 52) Cleveland, Ohio, U.S.
- Resting place: Gethsemane Cemetery, St. Marys
- Party: Democratic

Charles Anthony Mooney (January 5, 1879 – May 29, 1931) was an American businessman and politician who served as a five-term U.S. representative from Ohio.

== Biography ==
Born in St. Marys, Auglaize County, Ohio, Mooney attended public and Jesuit schools. He was graduated from St. Marys High School in 1895 and then engaged in the local life insurance business. He moved to Cleveland, Ohio, in 1910 and continued the life insurance business.

=== Political career ===
He served as a member of the Ohio Senate from 1915 to 1919.

Mooney was elected as a Democrat to the Sixty-sixth Congress (March 4, 1919 – March 3, 1921). He was an unsuccessful candidate for reelection in 1920 to the Sixty-seventh Congress. He served as a delegate to the Democratic National Conventions in 1920, 1924, and 1928.

Mooney was elected to the Sixty-eighth and to the four succeeding Congresses and served from March 4, 1923 until his death.

=== Death ===
He died in Cleveland, Ohio, on May 29, 1931.

He was interred in Gethsemane Cemetery, St. Marys, Ohio.

== See also ==
- List of members of the United States Congress who died in office (1900–1949)

== Sources ==
- United States Congress. "Charles A. Mooney (id: M000887)". Biographical Directory of the United States Congress.

U.S. House of Representatives
Preceded by William Gordon	Member of the U.S. House of Representatives from Ohio's 20th congressional district 1919-1921	Succeeded by Miner G. Norton
Preceded by Miner G. Norton	Member of the U.S. House of Representatives from Ohio's 20th congressional district 1923-1931	Succeeded by Martin L. Sweeney
