= Alfred Cornelius Howland =

American painter

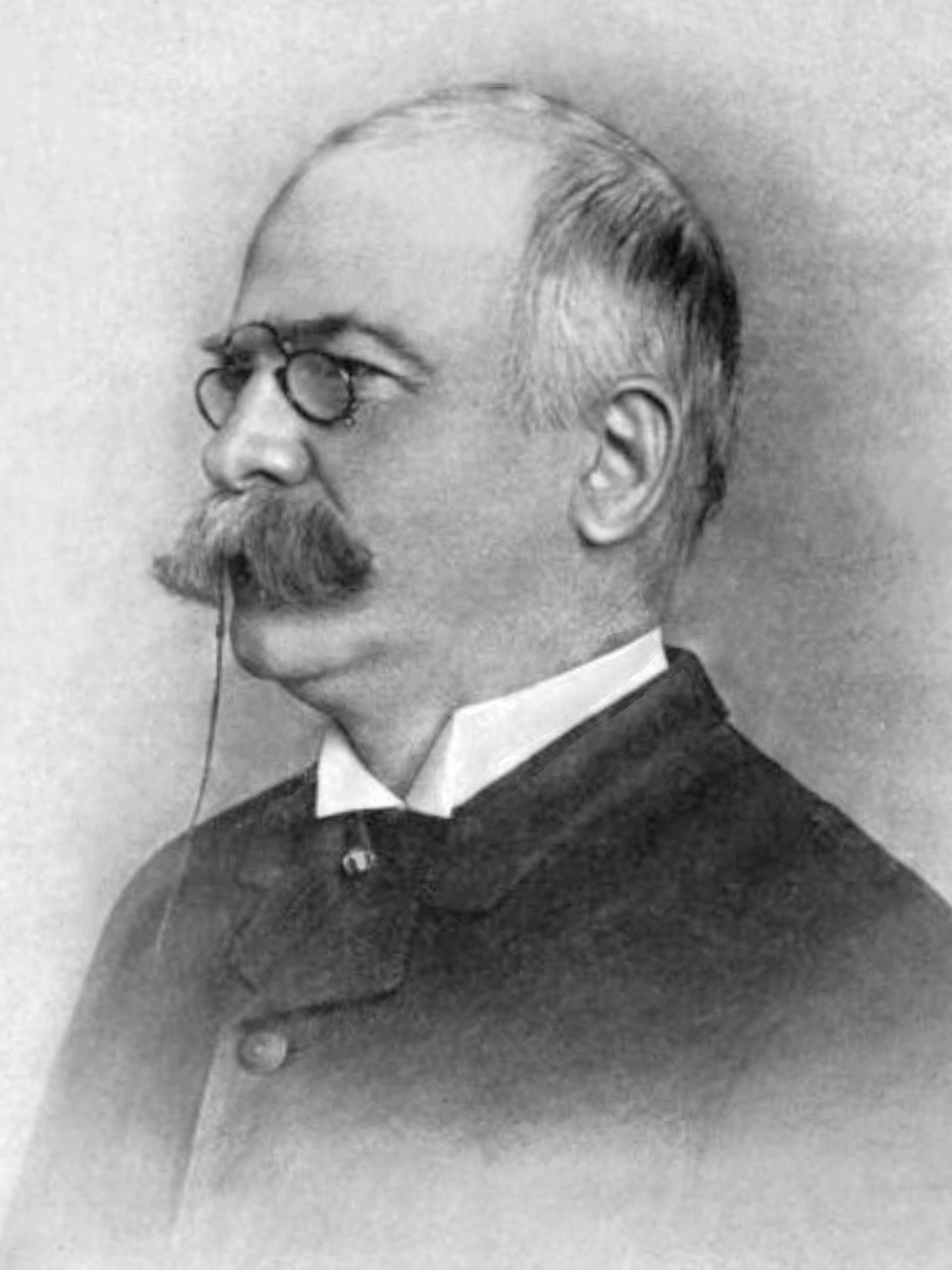
- 1902
- Born: February 12, 1838; Walpole, New Hampshire
- Died: March 17, 1909 (aged 71); Pasadena, California
- Resting place: Walpole Village Cemetery
- Occupation: Painting

Alfred Cornelius Howland (12 February 1838 – 17 March 1909) was an American painter.

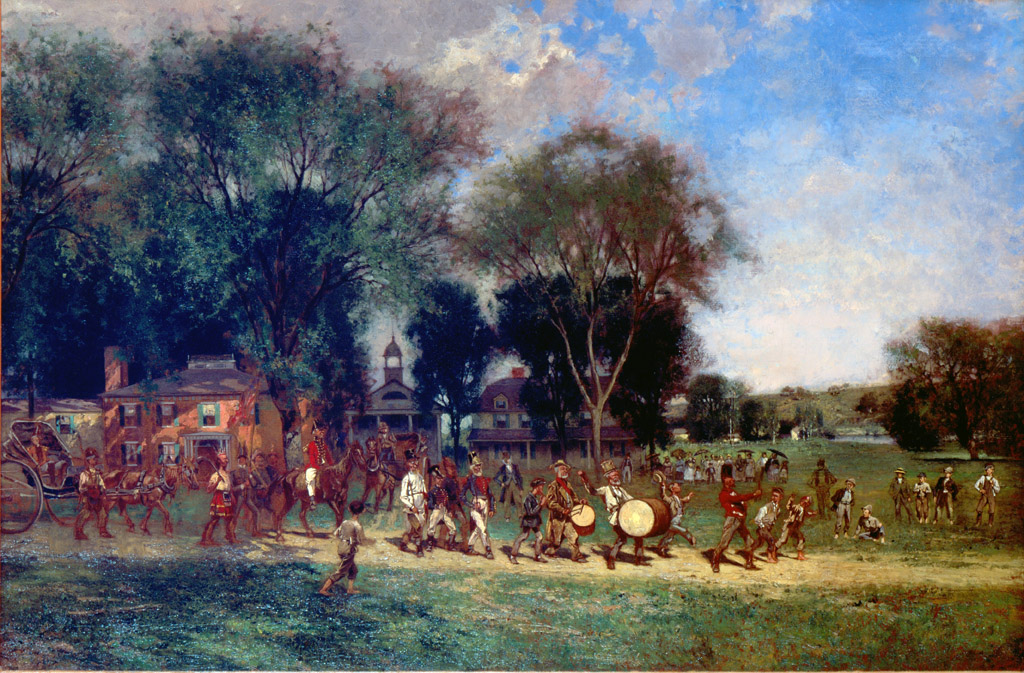
Fourth of July Parade, c.1886, High Museum of Art, Atlanta

He was born February 12, 1838, in Walpole, New Hampshire. As a youth, he worked as an engraver in Boston and a lithographer in New York. Starting in 1859, he studied at the Kunstakademie Düsseldorf in Germany under Andreas Müller until 1861 and under Albert Flamm until 1862. He spent the next few years in Paris and worked with French Barbizon School painters Jean-François Millet and Théodore Rousseau. He returned to America in 1865 and worked in New York and Williamstown, Massachusetts. He is best known for genre paintings, landscapes and portraits. He died March 17, 1909, in Pasadena, California.

Howland was a member of the National Academy of Design and was member of the Academy council from 1880 to 1884.

His works can be found in many US museums, including the Smithsonian American Art Museum, Metropolitan Museum of Art, The Brooklyn Museum of Art, High Museum of Art in Atlanta, Milwaukee Art Museum and Yale University Art Gallery.
