= James V. Stanton =

American lawyer and politician (1932–2022)

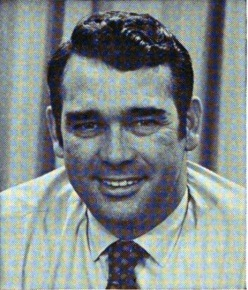

Member of the U.S. House of Representatives from Ohio's 20th district
- In office January 3, 1971 – January 3, 1977
- Preceded by: Michael A. Feighan
- Succeeded by: Mary Rose Oakar

President of the Cleveland City Council
- In office 1964–1970
- Preceded by: Jack P. Russell
- Succeeded by: Anthony Garofoli

Member of the Cleveland City Council
- In office 1959–1970

Personal details
- Born: James Vincent Stanton; February 27, 1932 Cleveland, Ohio, U.S.
- Died: May 2, 2022 (aged 90)
- Party: Democratic
- Spouse: Peggy Casserly (m. 1960; died 2021)
- Education: University of Dayton (BA); Cleveland State University (JD); Harvard University (MBA)

Military service
- Allegiance: United States
- Branch/service: United States Air Force
- Years of service: 1950–1954
- Battles/wars: Korean War

James Vincent Stanton (February 27, 1932 – May 2, 2022) was an American lawyer and politician who served three terms as a U.S. representative from Ohio from 1971 to 1977.

== Early life and career ==
Born in Cleveland, Ohio, Stanton graduated from Holy Name High School in 1949 and then served in the United States Air Force from 1950 to 1954, during the Korean War. He earned an A.B. from the University of Dayton in 1958, and a J.D. from the Cleveland-Marshall College of Law in 1961. He became a member of the Ohio bar association that year, and went into private practice.

== Political career ==
Stanton served as a member of the Cleveland city council from 1959 to 1970, serving as president from 1964 to 1970. He was then elected as a Democrat to the 92nd and to the two succeeding Congresses (January 3, 1971 – January 3, 1977). In his last Congress, he was instrumental in getting House Doorkeeper William "Fishbait" Miller defeated by the House Caucus and installed his friend and protégé James Molloy in Miller's place. Molloy kept the office until it was abolished in 1995.

Stanton did not seek renomination to the House in 1976, but ran unsuccessfully for nomination to the United States Senate. He supported the man who bested him in the primary, Howard Metzenbaum. Though he had been instrumental in the House for a few years, he tired of the slow progress members encountered in gaining stature in the body.

== Later career ==
After his political career, Stanton resumed the practice of law in Washington, D.C. from 1977 to 1981. He served as executive vice president of Delaware North Companies in Buffalo, New York, from 1981 to 1988. He went on to earn an A.M.P. from Harvard University Business School in 1984. He was a resident of Potomac, Maryland, and died on May 2, 2022, at age 90.

Political offices
| Preceded by Jack P. Russell | President of Cleveland City Council; 1964–1970 | Succeeded by Anthony Garofoli |
U.S. House of Representatives
| Preceded by Michael A. Feighan | Member of the U.S. House of Representatives from Ohio's 20th congressional district 1971–1977 | Succeeded by Mary Rose Oakar |
