= Howland (CDP), Maine =

Howland, Maine
- Census-designated place
- Location within Maine Location within the United States
- Coordinates: 45°14′44″N 68°39′43″W
- Country: United States
- State: Maine
- County: Penobscot

Area
  - Total: 7.72 sq mi (19.99 km^{2})
  - Land: 7.46 sq mi (19.31 km^{2})
  - Water: 0.26 sq mi (0.68 km^{2})
- Elevation: 167 ft (51 m)

Population (2020)
  - Total: 947
  - Density: 127.0/sq mi (49.04/km^{2})
- Time zone: UTC-5 (Eastern (EST))
  - Summer (DST): UTC-4 (EDT)
- ZIP code: 04448
- Area code: 207
- FIPS code: 23-34225
- GNIS feature ID: 2377919

Howland is a census-designated place (CDP) in Penobscot County, Maine, United States. The population was 1,096 at the 2010 census.

== Geography ==
According to the United States Census Bureau, the CDP has a total area of 7.7 square miles (20.0 km^{2}), of which 7.5 square miles (19.3 km^{2}) is land and 0.27 square miles (0.7 km^{2}), or 3.65%, is water.

== Demographics ==
Historical population
Census	Pop.	Note	%±
2020	947		—
U.S. Decennial Census

As of the census of 2000, there were 1,210 people, 500 households, and 322 families residing in the CDP. The population density was 161.4 inhabitants per square mile (62.3/km^{2}). There were 544 housing units at an average density of 28.0 persons/km^{2} (72.6 persons/sq mi). The racial makeup of the CDP was 98.26% White, 0.25% African American, 0.25% Native American, 0.08% Asian, 0.17% from other races, and 0.99% from two or more races. Hispanic or Latino of any race were 0.17% of the population.

There were 500 households, out of which 28.4% had children under the age of 18 living with them, 53.8% were married couples living together, 7.8% had a female householder with no husband present, and 35.4% were non-families. 30.0% of all households were made up of individuals, and 14.2% had someone living alone who was 65 years of age or older. The average household size was 2.33 and the average family size was 2.87.

In the CDP, the population was spread out, with 23.1% under the age of 18, 6.4% from 18 to 24, 27.7% from 25 to 44, 24.3% from 45 to 64, and 18.6% who were 65 years of age or older. The median age was 40 years. For every 100 females, there were 85.6 males. For every 100 females age 18 and over, there were 87.7 males.

The median income for a household in the CDP was $28,261, and the median income for a family was $36,250. Males had a median income of $32,333 versus $19,792 for females. The per capita income for the CDP was $15,875. About 6.1% of families and 11.5% of the population were below the poverty line, including 9.7% of those under the age of 18 and 25.6% ages 65 or older.
