= Mary Rose Oakar =

American politician (1940–2025)

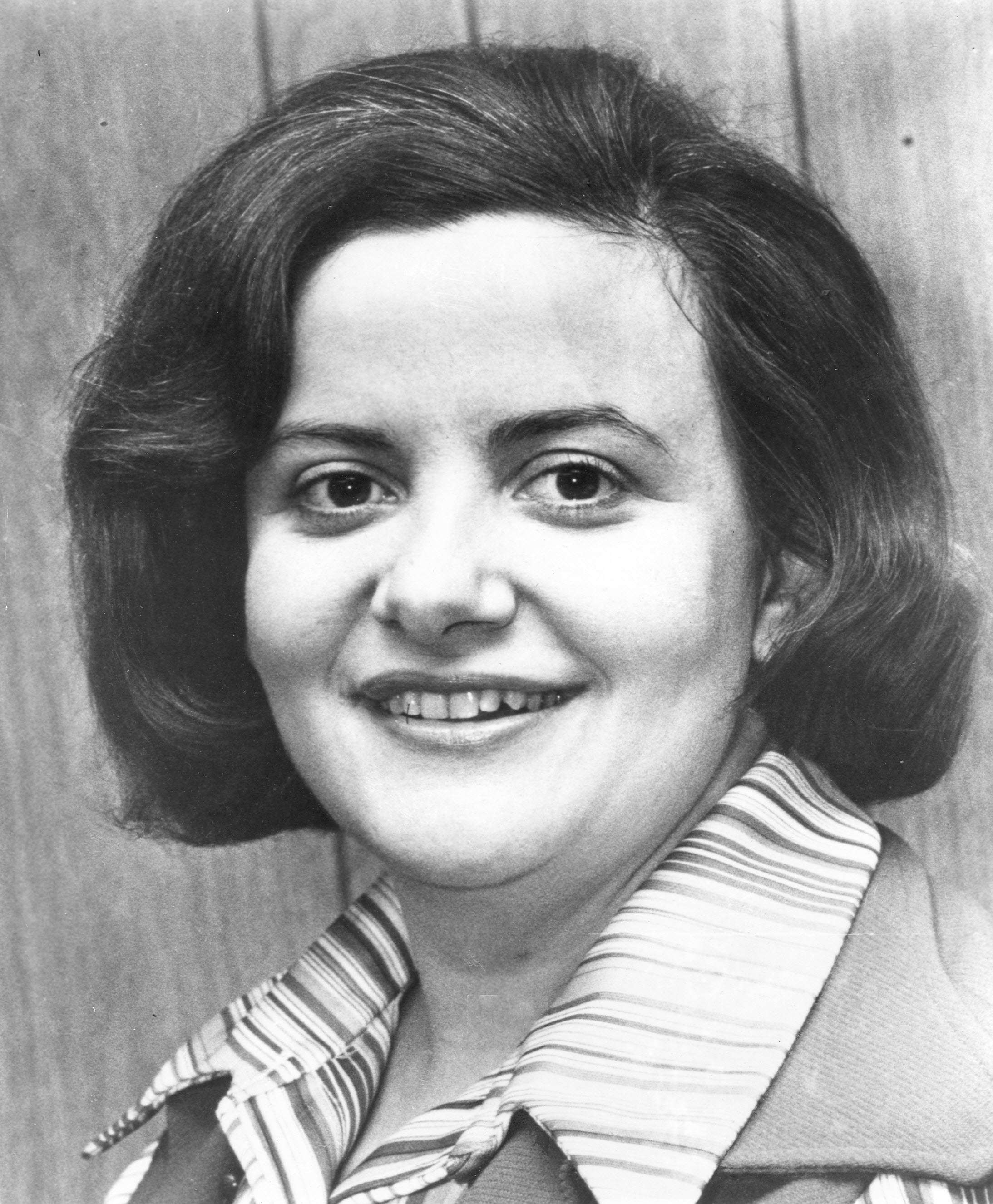

Member of the Ohio House of Representatives from the 13th district
- In office January 3, 2001 – December 31, 2002
- Preceded by: Barbara C. Pringle
- Succeeded by: Michael J. Skindell

Vice Chair of the House Democratic Caucus
- In office January 3, 1985 – January 3, 1989 (Note: Known as Secretary of the House Democratic Caucus until January 3, 1987)
- Leader: Tip O'Neill; Jim Wright
- Preceded by: Geraldine Ferraro (Secretary)
- Succeeded by: Steny Hoyer

Member of the U.S. House of Representatives from Ohio's 20th district
- In office January 3, 1977 – January 3, 1993
- Preceded by: James V. Stanton
- Succeeded by: Martin Hoke (redistricted)

Personal details
- Born: March 5, 1940 Cleveland, Ohio, U.S.
- Died: September 13, 2025 (aged 85) Lakewood, Ohio, U.S.
- Party: Democratic
- Education: Ursuline College (BA); Columbia University (attended); John Carroll University (MA)

Mary Rose Oakar (March 5, 1940 – September 13, 2025) was an American Democratic politician who was a member of the United States House of Representatives from Ohio, serving from 1977 to 1993. Oakar was the first Arab American woman, first Syrian American, and first Lebanese American woman to serve in Congress. She was also the first Democratic woman elected to the United States Congress from that state. Oakar later served as a member of the Ohio State Board of Education.

== Early life ==
Mary Rose Oakar was born in Cleveland on March 5, 1940. She graduated with a B.A. from Ursuline College in 1962 and an M.A. from John Carroll University in 1966. She had also attended Columbia University in 1963, and spent some time in England, attending the Royal Academy of Dramatic Art in 1964, and Westham Adult College, Warwickshire, in 1968. She taught at her alma mater of Lourdes Academy, a Catholic high school for women, directed plays, taught at Cuyahoga Community College from 1968 to 1975 and served on the Cleveland City Council from 1973 to 1976.

== U.S. House of Representatives ==
In 1976, Oakar was elected to the United States House of Representatives as the member for Ohio's 20th congressional district, comprising Cleveland's West Side and the surrounding suburbs. She took office in 1977, succeeding James V. Stanton.

Oakar, one of very few Arab-American members of the House (she was of Lebanese and Syrian ancestry), became regarded as an increasingly powerful member. She was a high-ranking member of the Banking, Housing and Urban Affairs Committee, the Committee on Post Office and Civil Service and the House Administration Committee. Oakar's high placement on these committees allowed her to bring home to Cleveland large sums of money for urban renewal. Oakar forged strong relationships with Jewish groups in Cleveland. From 1985 to 1989, she was elected to a position in the House Democratic leadership, as Secretary of the House Democratic Caucus.

=== Financial scandals ===
In 1991, she was one of nearly 100 Members of Congress involved in the widespread House banking scandal involving multiple overdrafts and bounced checks. She had written 213 overdrafted checks. The House Bank, not a normally operating financial institution, was used to pay members of the House. However, members were allowed to take advances on their pay checks without overdraft charges or repercussions to their credit.

Oakar used the names of straw donors on federal documents to conceal illegal contributions amounting to $16,000. In 1995, she was indicted on seven counts in federal court, including lying to the FBI, filing false financial statements and using the House bank to convert public money for personal use. Three counts against her were thrown out by the Supreme Court, the others were dropped after she entered a plea bargain in which she pleaded guilty to two misdemeanor charges; conspiracy and violation of election law.

=== Redistricting and defeat ===
In 1992, her district was renumbered the 10th and redrawn to include more Republicans, though it was still solidly Democratic. Oakar withstood a challenge from Cuyahoga County Commissioner Tim Hagan in the Democratic primary — Hagan had been endorsed by Cleveland Mayor Michael R. White — but lost to businessman Martin Hoke in the general election.

== Post-Congress career ==
Oakar won a 1999 libel settlement against Cleveland's newspaper, The Plain Dealer, after seven years in court. In April 1992 The Plain Dealer published articles alleging that Oakar was forced to resign from a congressional task force after the House banking scandal. The paper acknowledged that the eight-term Democrat "was rightfully upset that erroneous information" had been printed.

She served a single term in the Ohio House of Representatives from 2000 to 2002. During her time in the State House, Oakar unsuccessfully ran in the 2001 Cleveland mayoral election. She came third in nonpartisan primary election and failed advance to the general election.

Oakar served as president of the American-Arab Anti-Discrimination Committee (ADC) from 2003 through 2010. ADC describes itself as the largest Arab-American grassroots civil-rights organization in the U.S.

In November 2012, she was elected to a four-year term on the Ohio State Board of Education where she represented District 11, which encompasses Ohio Senate districts 21, 23, and 25.

== Death ==
Oakar died at a care home in Lakewood, Ohio, on September 13, 2025, at the age of 85.

== In popular culture ==
In 1979, the Supersisters trading card set was produced and distributed; one of the cards featured Oakar's name and picture.

== See also ==
- List of American federal politicians convicted of crimes
- List of Arab and Middle-Eastern Americans in the United States Congress
- List of federal political scandals in the United States
- Women in the United States House of Representatives

U.S. House of Representatives
Preceded by James Stanton	Member of the U.S. House of Representatives from Ohio's 20th congressional district 1977–1993	Constituency abolished
Party political offices
Preceded by Geraldine Ferraro	Secretary of the House Democratic Caucus; 1985–1987	Succeeded by Herself as Vice Chair of the House Democratic Caucus
Preceded by Herself as Secretary of the House Democratic Caucus	Vice Chair of the House Democratic Caucus; 1987–1989	Succeeded by Steny Hoyer
