= Edwin L. Howland =

American architect

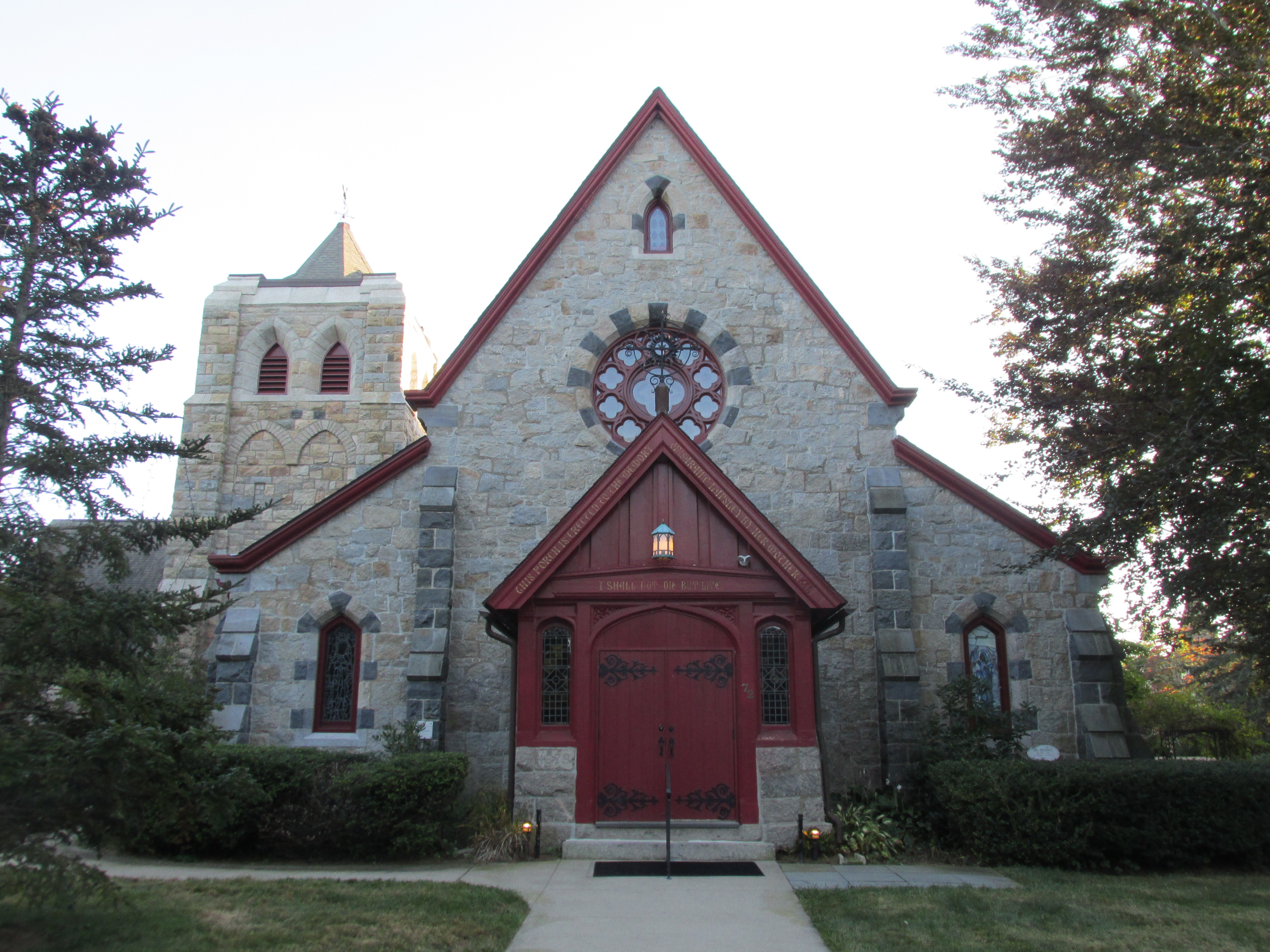
St. Peter's Church (1870), Narragansett Pier

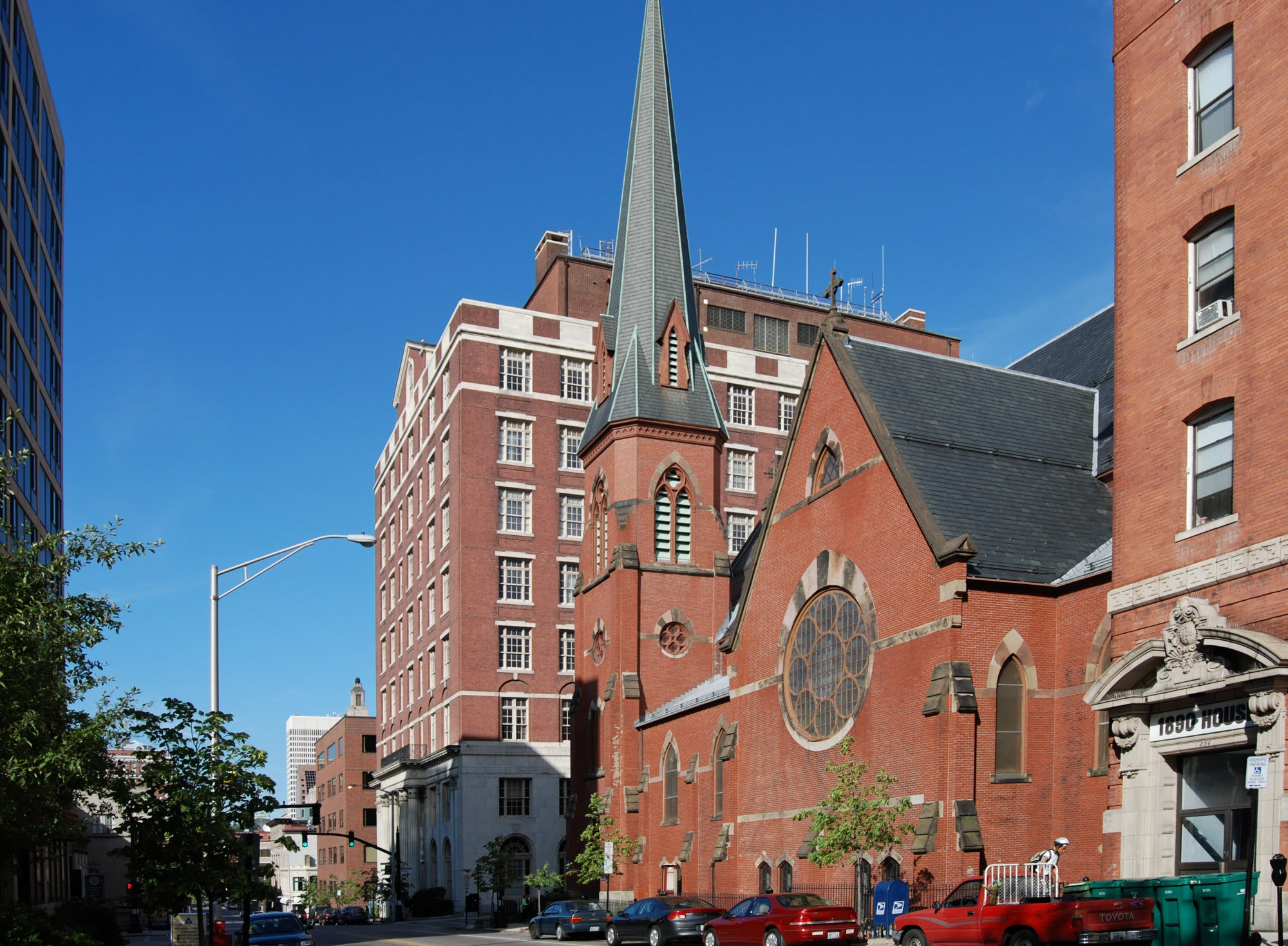
First Universalist Church (1871), Providence.

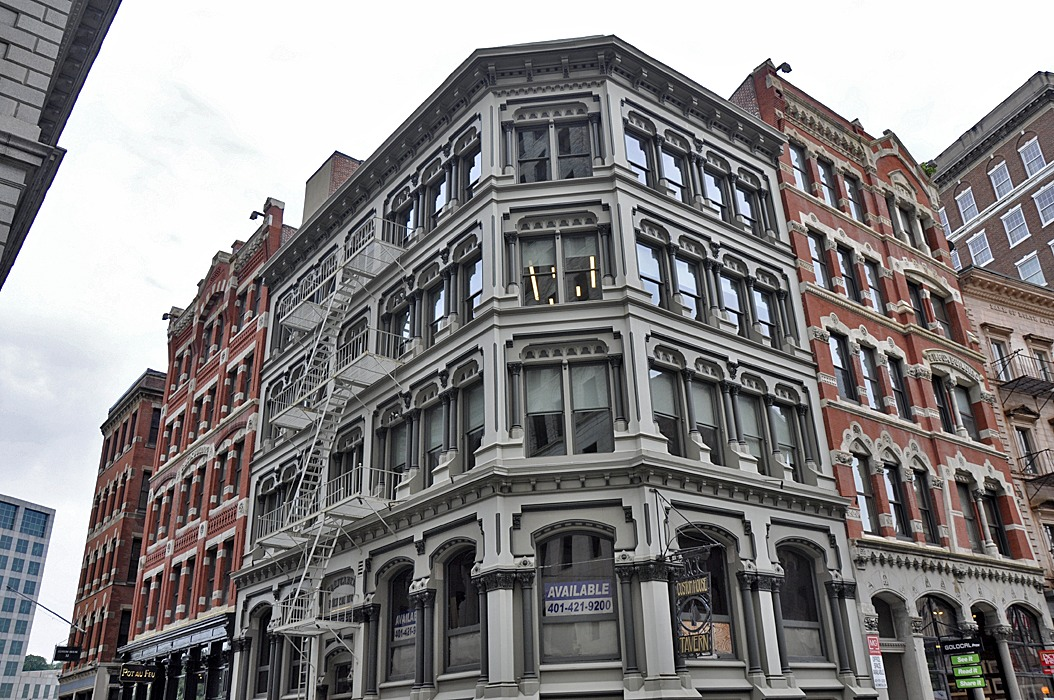
William R. Walker's Equitable Building (1872) surrounded by Howland's Wilcox Building (1875), Providence.

Edwin L. Howland (1838–1876) was an American architect from Rhode Island who, despite his short career, designed several of Providence's most significant buildings of the 1860s and 1870s.

Edwin Lee Howland was born in Pawtucket on June 5, 1838, to Edwin and Susan Howland. He attended the public schools, and entered Providence High School in 1852. After high school he worked for Russell Warren, then near the end of his life. After Warren's death (1860) he was in Hartford, Connecticut, where he worked for William T. Hallett. Then he moved on to New York, where he worked for Calvert Vaux. In 1864 he returned to Providence, associating himself with prominent ecclesiastical architect James Murphy. He had left Murphy and established his own office by 1868. Howland died in Providence on June 28, 1876. In his will he left his architectural library to the Rhode Island chapter of the American Institute of Architects, of which he had been a founding member in January 1876.

Howland was noted for his High Victorian Gothic designs, predominantly churches. His Wilcox Building of 1875 is considered the best example of this type of architecture in the state.

Upon Howland's death, chapter secretary Charles P. Hartshorn wrote of him and his work, "Mr. Howland was a man of sterling integrity, of untiring devotion to his profession, and honorable in the practice therof. Of much original genius, his later works show a remarkable increase in power of design and refinement of taste, and some of them deserve to rank with the best of the present generation ... let us so build that when we too pass on, each one of us may leave as clean a record behind".

== Architectural work ==
- 1868 - Federal Street Grammar School, 153 Dean St, Providence, Rhode Island
  - Demolished
- 1869 - Church of the Mediator, 101 Cranston St, Providence, Rhode Island
  - Mostly demolished
- 1870 - St. Peter's Church, 72 Central St, Narragansett Pier, Rhode Island
- 1871 - First Universalist Church, 250 Washington St, Providence, Rhode Island
- 1873 - Pilgrim Congregational Church, 18 Harrison St, Providence, Rhode Island
  - Heavily altered
- 1874 - Durfee Building, 77 Dyer St, Providence, Rhode Island
  - Demolished, Howland's only known Second Empire design
- 1874 - Dutee Wilcox House, 643 Elmwood Ave, Providence, Rhode Island
  - Demolished
- 1875 - Wilcox Building, 42 Weybosset St, Providence, Rhode Island
