= William Howland =

William Howland may refer to:

- William Howland (musician) (1871–1945), American operatic bass, voice teacher, composer, conductor and university administrator
- William Bailey Howland (1848–1917), American editor
- William Howland (American politician) (1823–1905), American politician
- William Goldwin Carrington Howland (1915–1994), Canadian lawyer, judge and former Chief Justice of Ontario
- William Holmes Howland (1844–1893), Canadian politician
- William Pearce Howland (1821–1907), Canadian politician
