= Esther Howland =

American artist and entrepreneur

Esther Allen Howland
- Born: August 17, 1828; Worcester, Massachusetts, U.S.
- Died: March 15, 1904 (aged 75); Quincy, Massachusetts, U.S.
- Occupation: Founder of the New England Valentine Company
- Years active: 1850-1880
- Known for: The Mother of the American Valentine

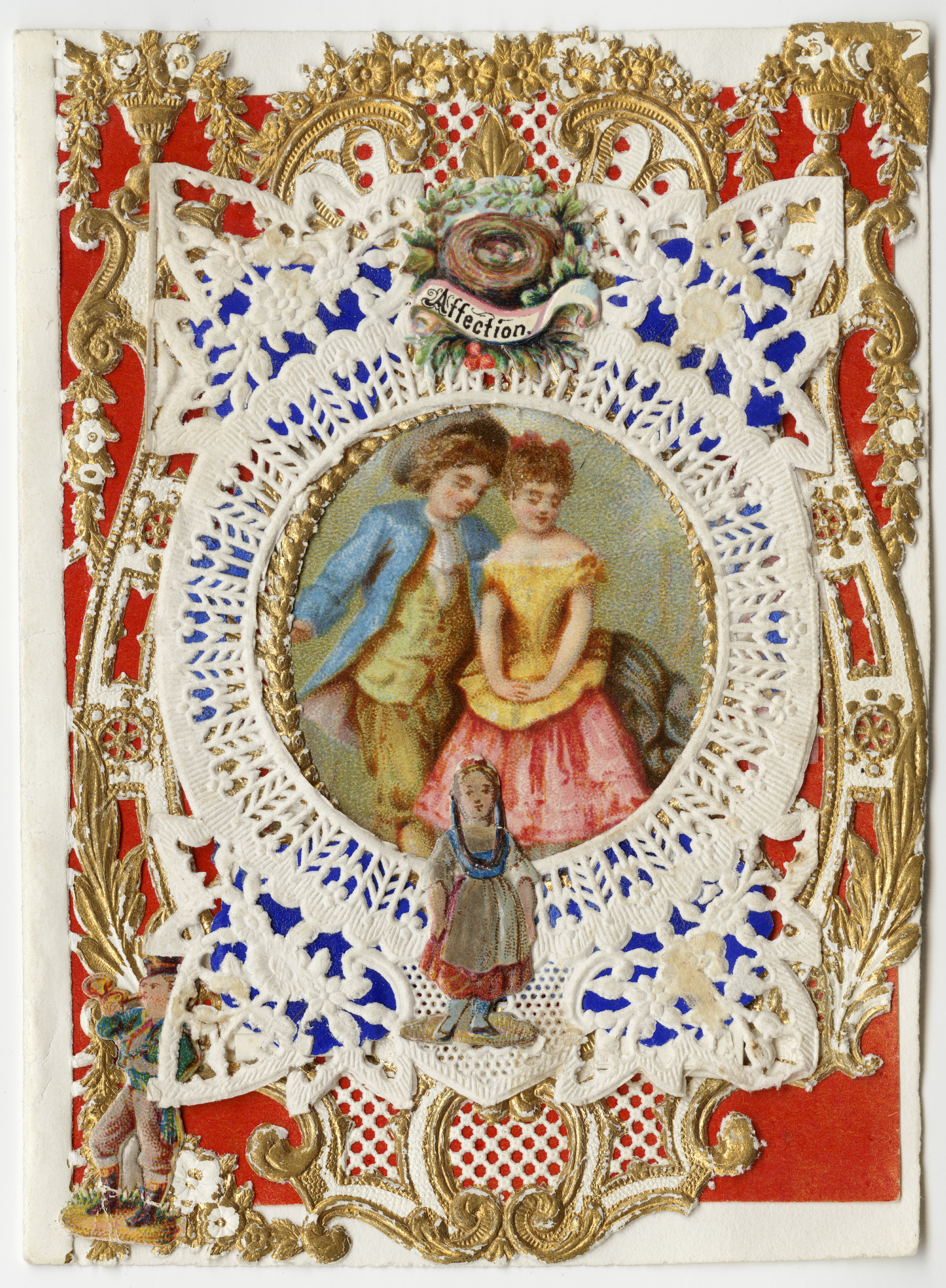
Esther Howland Valentine card, "Affection" ca. 1870s

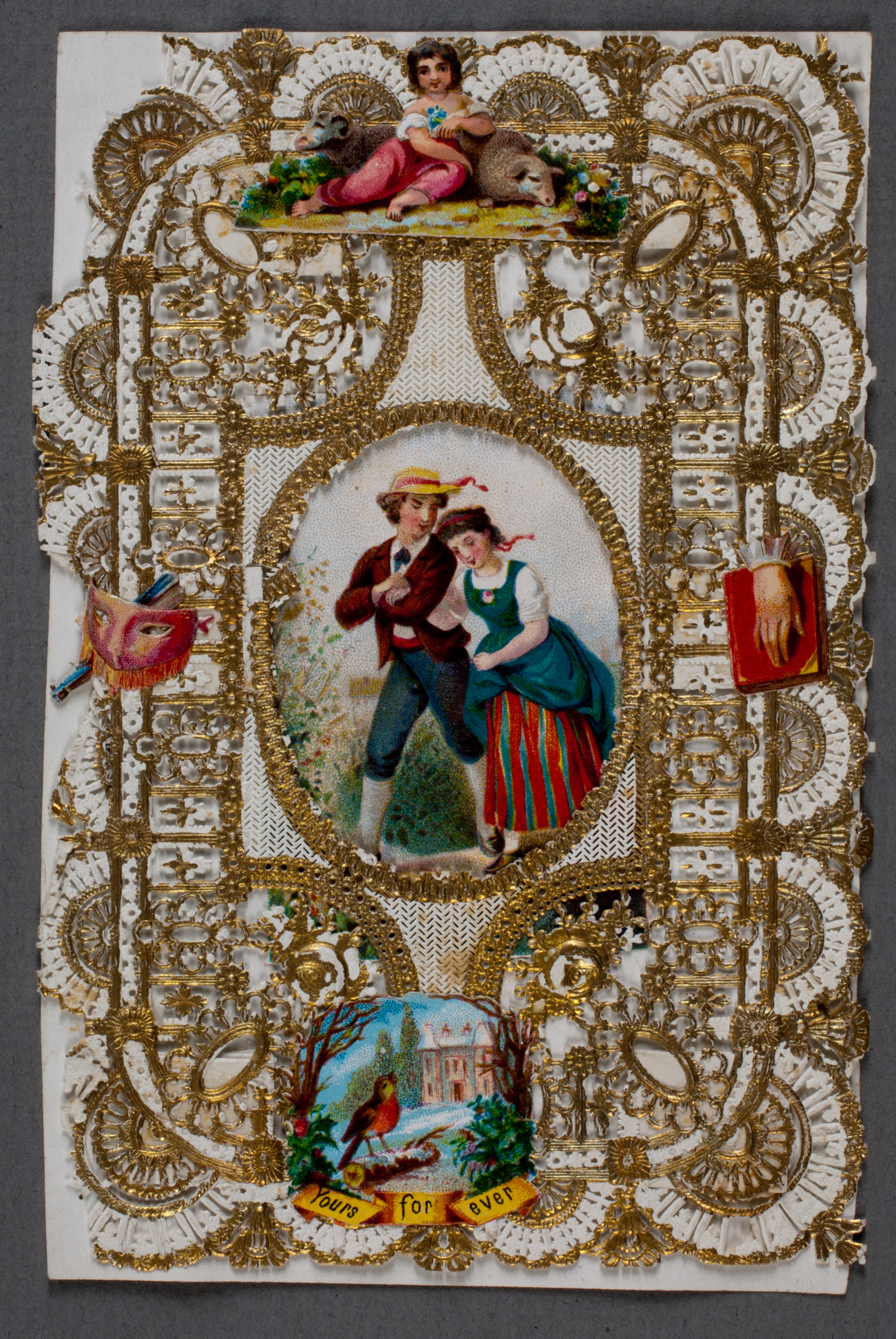
Valentine by Esther Howland

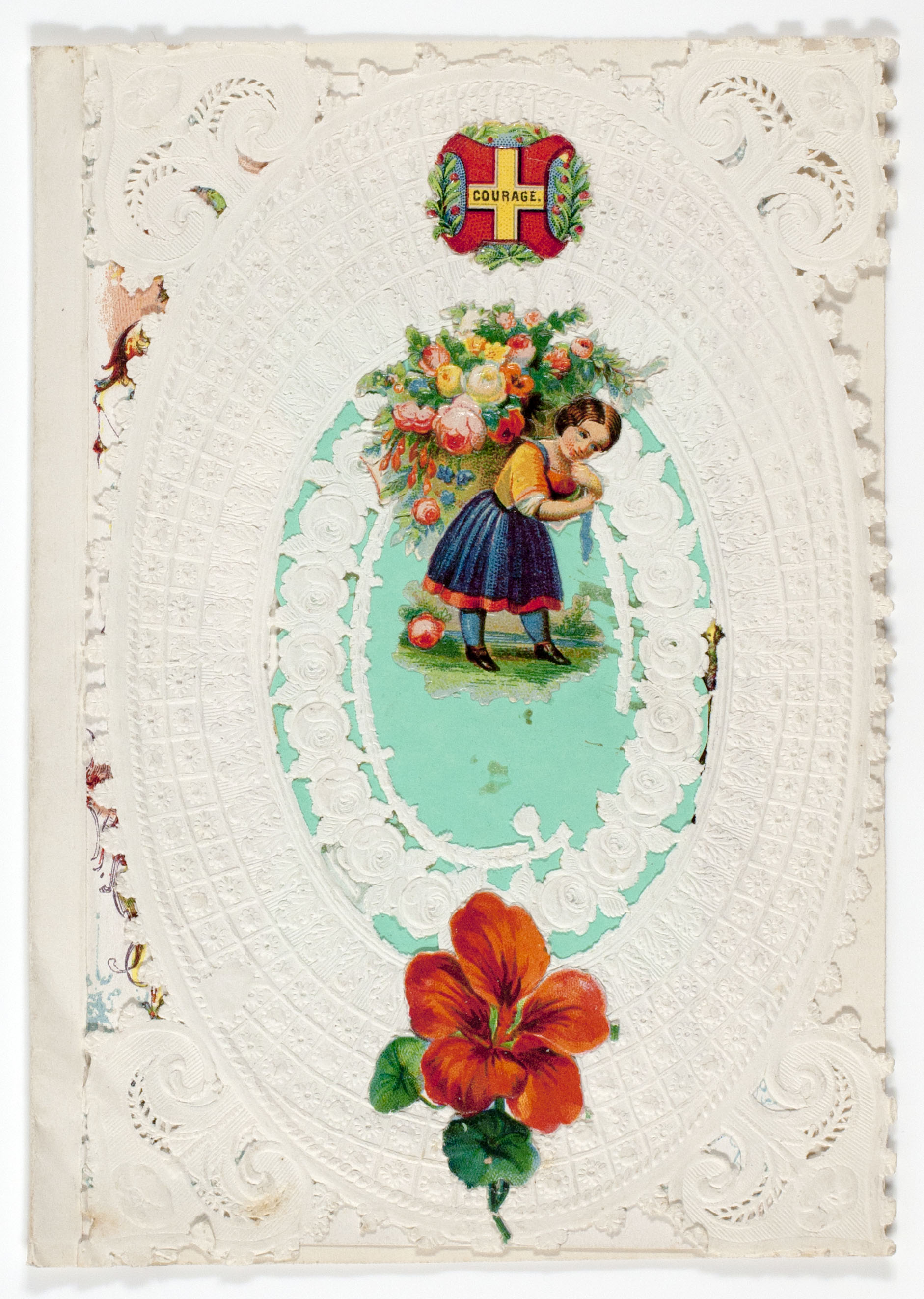
Valentine by Esther Howland

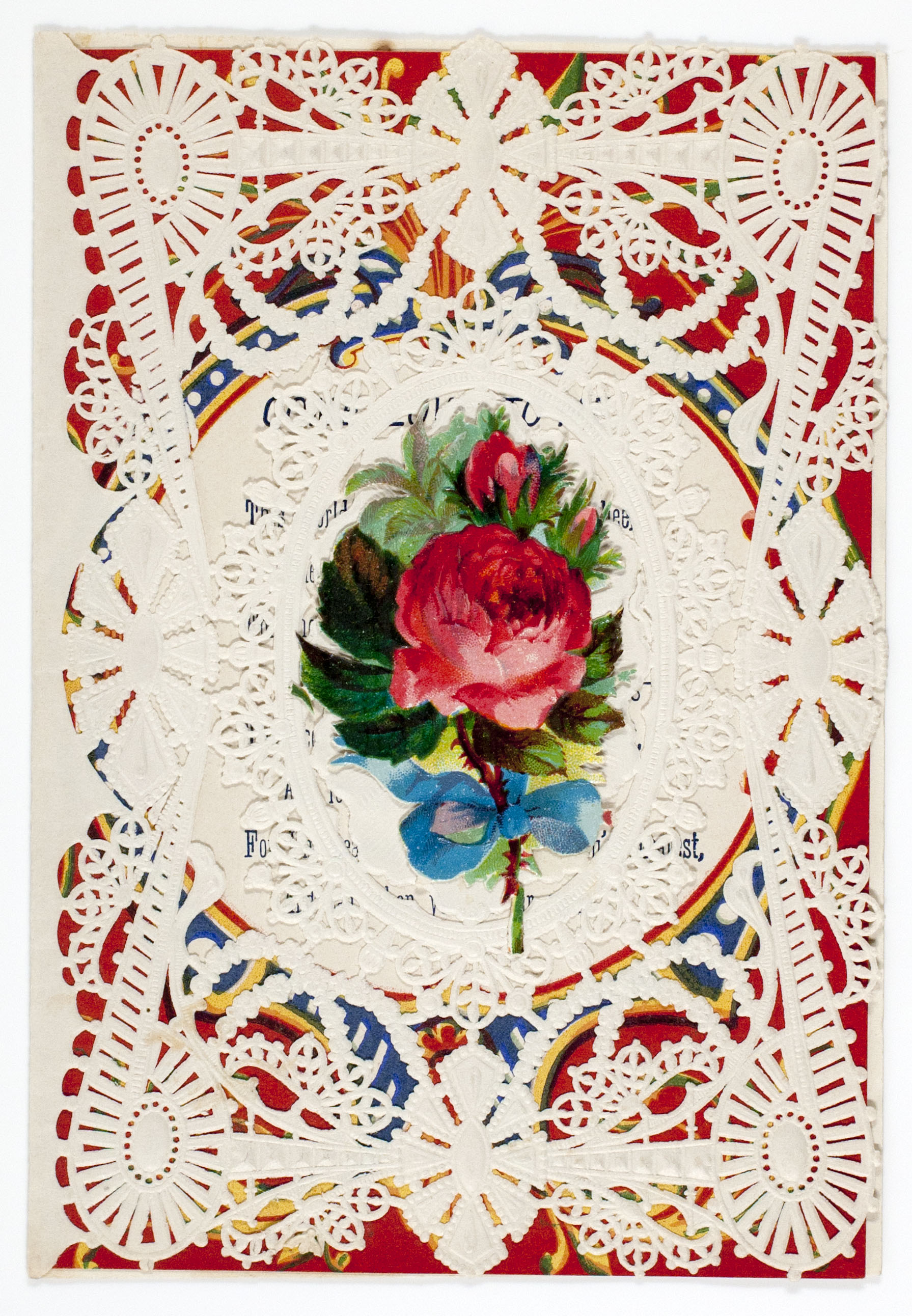
Valentine by Esther Howland

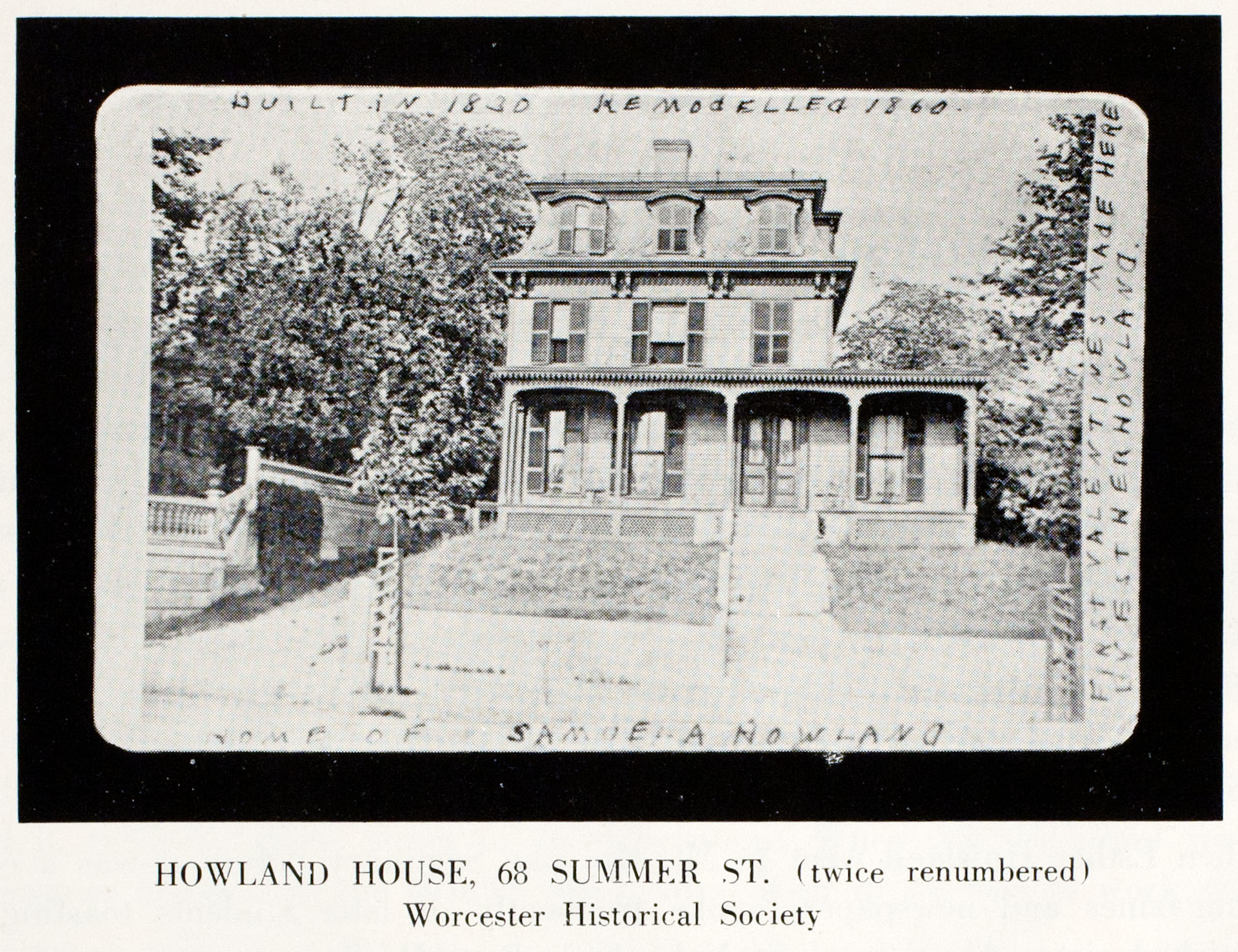
The house where Esther Howland lived

Esther Howland (1828–1904) was an artist and entrepreneur who was responsible for popularizing Valentine's Day greeting cards in America.

== Early life ==
Esther Allen Howland, born in Worcester, Massachusetts, was the daughter of Southworth Allen Howland (1800–1882) and Esther Allen. Her brothers were William, Samuel and Joseph Howland. Her mother wrote the cookbook The New England Economical Housekeeper and Family Receipt Book, which was published in 1844 (and for the next ten years) by her father S. A. Howland. Her father operated S.A. Howland & Sons. the largest book and stationery store in Worcester, Massachusetts. Esther and her father were descendants of Mayflower passenger John Howland.

Howland graduated from Mount Holyoke College (then Mount Holyoke Women's Seminary) in 1847.

== Career ==
Shortly after graduating from Mount Holyoke College at the age of 19, Howland received a valentine card from a business associate of her father's. The valentine was decorated with an elaborate fine lace border, ornate flowers cut-outs and a small pale green envelope in the center that contained a verse appropriate for Valentine's Day. At this time, elaborate Valentine greeting cards were imported from Europe and not affordable to many Americans.

The custom arrived in the United States in the mid-1800s, and crafty, entrepreneurial women fueled its commercialization.

It is said that Esther Howland received this first Valentine’s Day card from someone in Britain in 1847 and was inspired to create her own version. Determined she could make a better card, Howland convinced her father to order supplies from New York City and England. She made a dozen samples that her salesman brother added to his inventory for his next sales trip for their father's business. Hoping for $200.00 worth of orders, Howland was elated when her brother returned with over $5,000 worth of business for her.

“It was her idea to essentially create an assembly line of women putting together these really complex Valentines,” said Jamie Kwan, an assistant curator at the Cooper Hewitt, Smithsonian Design Museum. "The cards were handmade, and Howland “imported materials from the U.K. and Germany to incorporate into these cards.”

Howland built a thriving business in Worcester, Massachusetts using an assembly line of friends to copy designs and help construct the cards. In the Howland's Residence on Summer Street, a guest bedroom on the third floor was set up for Howland's newly founded business. Howland was in charge of cutting the basic design for the individual valentine while the assembly group was responsible for carefully copying each card. Howland also hired women who had to work from home by preparing a box with all the materials required. A week later they would be picked up by a driver and turned to Howland for their inspection. Howland reported that her girls were paid "liberally" and that work was "light and pleasant." She would inspect every card that was produced by her assistants. Her early cards contained short four-line verses pasted inside of them much like earlier English valentines. This model would eventually become standard for the American valentine market. Although Valentine's Day cards had been available in America for more than half a century before Esther started her business, she was the first person to commercialize them in America.

In 1850, her first advertisement appeared in the Worcester Spy. Soon enough she found herself in the position of a businesswoman. She began to import materials from Germany. She also came up with the idea of using silk and embossing lithograph ornaments. In order to distinguish her valentines, Howland began stamping the letter "H" on the back of her cards in red ink along with the price and the letters ‘N.E.V.Co.’, which stood for the name of her company New England Valentine Company. Cards that included ribbons, artistic illustrations, hidden doors, gilded lace and interior envelopes that could hold more secret messages, locks of hair or even engagement rings , sold up to one dollar to fifty dollars. Howland also created cards for Christmas, new year, and birthdays, as well as cards, booklets, and May baskets.

Howland suffered a knee injury in 1866 that forced her to be in a wheelchair. In 1870, Howland incorporated her business as the New England Valentine Company. She continued to work from her home until 1879 when she moved to a factory. During that same year, Howland published The New England Valentine Co.’s Valentine Verse Book that consisted of 31 pages. The book was intended for customers who found a beautiful card but didn't like the verse that was inside. With the book they could choose from a total of 131 verses all printed in red, green, blue, and gold ink and came in three different sizes. With their chosen verse, customer could then paste it over the original verse in their card. In 1870, Howland merged her business with one of her competitors, Edward Taft.

Howland's cards were shipped nation-wide and her business eventually grossed over $100,000 per year. Howland eventually sold the business to a competitor, George Whitney, in 1880 in order to take care of her sick father. In 1904, Howland fractured a femur and was bedridden for eight months. She died in her home at 9 Adams St in Quincy.

Howland's valentine cards became renowned throughout the United States and after her death, she was called "The Mother of the American Valentine." She is credited for the introduction of the "lift-up" valentine, which created layers of texture and color using lace, ribbon, and other materials. Howland introduced the layering of lace, use of thin paper, three-dimensional accordion effects, and a bouquet in which flowers would move to reveal a verse when pulled by a string.

== See also ==
- Frances Brundage
- Ellen Clapsaddle
