= Ohio's 20th congressional district =

Defunct U.S. Congress electoral division

Coordinates: 41°25′N 81°40′W

- Obsolete district
- Created: 1830
- Eliminated: 1990
- Years active: 1813–1993

The 20th congressional district of Ohio was created after the 1840 census. It was eliminated in the redistricting following the 1990 census, and redistricted and renumbered as the 10th district.

In its last decade, the district consisted of central Cuyahoga county.

== List of members representing the district ==
Member	Party	Year(s)	Cong ress	Electoral history
District established March 4, 1843
Joshua Reed Giddings (Jefferson)	Whig	March 4, 1843 – March 3, 1849	28th 29th 30th 31st 32nd 33rd 34th 35th	Redistricted from the 16th district and re-elected in 1843. Re-elected in 1844. Re-elected in 1846. Re-elected in 1848. Re-elected in 1850. Re-elected in 1852. Re-elected in 1854. Re-elected in 1856. Lost renomination.
Joshua Reed Giddings (Jefferson)	Free Soil	March 4, 1849 – March 3, 1855	28th 29th 30th 31st 32nd 33rd 34th 35th	Redistricted from the 16th district and re-elected in 1843. Re-elected in 1844. Re-elected in 1846. Re-elected in 1848. Re-elected in 1850. Re-elected in 1852. Re-elected in 1854. Re-elected in 1856. Lost renomination.
Joshua Reed Giddings (Jefferson)	Anti-Nebraska	March 4, 1855 – March 3, 1857	28th 29th 30th 31st 32nd 33rd 34th 35th	Redistricted from the 16th district and re-elected in 1843. Re-elected in 1844. Re-elected in 1846. Re-elected in 1848. Re-elected in 1850. Re-elected in 1852. Re-elected in 1854. Re-elected in 1856. Lost renomination.
Joshua Reed Giddings (Jefferson)	Republican	March 4, 1857 – March 3, 1859	28th 29th 30th 31st 32nd 33rd 34th 35th	Redistricted from the 16th district and re-elected in 1843. Re-elected in 1844. Re-elected in 1846. Re-elected in 1848. Re-elected in 1850. Re-elected in 1852. Re-elected in 1854. Re-elected in 1856. Lost renomination.
John Hutchins (Warren)	Republican	March 4, 1859 – March 3, 1863	36th 37th	Elected in 1858. Re-elected in 1860. Retired.
District dissolved March 3, 1863
District re-established March 3, 1873
Richard C. Parsons (Cleveland)	Republican	March 4, 1873 – March 3, 1875	43rd	Elected in 1872. [data missing]
Henry B. Payne (Cleveland)	Democratic	March 4, 1875 – March 3, 1877	44th	Elected in 1874. [data missing]
Amos Townsend (Cleveland)	Republican	March 4, 1877 – March 3, 1883	45th 46th 47th	Elected in 1876. Re-elected in 1878. Re-elected in 1880. [data missing]
David R. Paige (Akron)	Democratic	March 4, 1883 – March 3, 1885	48th	Elected in 1882. [data missing]
William McKinley (Canton)	Republican	March 4, 1885 – March 3, 1887	49th	Elected in 1884. Redistricted to the 18th district.
George W. Crouse (Akron)	Republican	March 4, 1887 – March 3, 1889	50th	Elected in 1886. Retired.
Martin L. Smyser (Wooster)	Republican	March 4, 1889 – March 3, 1891	51st	Elected in 1888. Lost renomination.
Vincent A. Taylor (Bedford)	Republican	March 4, 1891 – March 3, 1893	52nd	Elected in 1890. Retired.
William J. White (Cleveland)	Republican	March 4, 1893 – March 3, 1895	53rd	Elected in 1892. Retired.
Clifton B. Beach (Cleveland)	Republican	March 4, 1895 – March 3, 1899	54th 55th	Elected in 1894. Re-elected in 1896. [data missing]
Fremont O. Phillips (Medina)	Republican	March 4, 1899 – March 3, 1901	56th	Elected in 1898. [data missing]
Jacob A. Beidler (Willoughby)	Republican	March 4, 1901 – March 3, 1907	57th 58th 59th	Elected in 1900. Re-elected in 1902. Re-elected in 1904. [data missing]
L. Paul Howland (Cleveland)	Republican	March 4, 1907 – March 3, 1913	60th 61st 62nd	Elected in 1906. Re-elected in 1908. Re-elected in 1910. [data missing]
William Gordon (Cleveland)	Democratic	March 4, 1913 – March 3, 1919	63rd 64th 65th	Elected in 1912. Re-elected in 1914. Re-elected in 1916. Lost renomination.
Charles A. Mooney (Cleveland)	Democratic	March 4, 1919 – March 3, 1921	66th	Elected in 1918. Lost re-election.
Miner G. Norton (Cleveland)	Republican	March 4, 1921 – March 3, 1923	67th	Elected in 1920. Lost re-election.
Charles A. Mooney (Cleveland)	Democratic	March 4, 1923 – May 29, 1931	68th 69th 70th 71st 72nd	Elected in 1922. Re-elected in 1924. Re-elected in 1926. Re-elected in 1928. Re-elected in 1930. Died.
Vacant		May 29, 1931 – November 3, 1931	72nd	
Martin L. Sweeney (Cleveland)	Democratic	November 3, 1931 – January 3, 1943	72nd 73rd 74th 75th 76th 77th	Elected to finish Mooney's term. Re-elected in 1932. Re-elected in 1934. Re-elected in 1936. Re-elected in 1938. Re-elected in 1940. Lost renomination.
Michael A. Feighan (Cleveland)	Democratic	January 3, 1943 – January 3, 1971	78th 79th 80th 81st 82nd 83rd 84th 85th 86th 87th 88th 89th 90th 91st	Elected in 1942. Re-elected in 1944. Re-elected in 1946. Re-elected in 1948. Re-elected in 1950. Re-elected in 1952. Re-elected in 1954. Re-elected in 1956. Re-elected in 1958. Re-elected in 1960. Re-elected in 1962. Re-elected in 1964. Re-elected in 1966. Re-elected in 1968. Lost renomination.
James V. Stanton (Cleveland)	Democratic	January 3, 1971 – January 3, 1977	92nd 93rd 94th	Elected in 1970. Re-elected in 1972. Re-elected in 1974. Retired to run for U.S. Senator.
Mary Rose Oakar (Cleveland)	Democratic	January 3, 1977 – January 3, 1993	95th 96th 97th 98th 99th 100th 101st 102nd	Elected in 1976. Re-elected in 1978. Re-elected in 1980. Re-elected in 1982. Re-elected in 1984. Re-elected in 1986. Re-elected in 1988. Re-elected in 1990. Redistricted to the 11th district and lost re-election.
District dissolved January 3, 1993

== Election results ==
The following chart shows historic election results. Bold type indicates victor. Italic type indicates incumbent.

Year	Democratic	Republican	Other
1990	**Mary Rose Oakar***: 109,390	Bill Smith: 39,749	
1988	**Mary Rose Oakar**: 146,715	Michael Sajna: 30,944	
1986	**Mary Rose Oakar**: 110,976	Bill Smith: 19,794	
1984	**Mary Rose Oakar**: 167,115		
1982	**Mary Rose Oakar**: 133,603	Paris T. LeJeune: 17,675	Louis Haberbush: 1,930; Milton R. Norris (L): 2,844
1980	**Mary Rose Oakar**: 96,217		
1978	**Mary Rose Oakar**: 76,973		
1976	Mary Rose Oakar: 98,785		Raymond J. Grabow: 20,553; Theodore Held III: 2,638
1974	**James Vincent Stanton**: 86,405	Robert A. Frantz: 12,991	
1972	**James Vincent Stanton**: 117,302	Thomas E. Vilt: 16,624	Richard B. Kay (AI): 5,285
1970	James Vincent Stanton: 70,140	J. William Petro: 16,118	
1968	**Michael A. Feighan**: 72,918	J. William Petro: 27,827	
1966	**Michael A. Feighan**: 63,629	Clarence E. McLeod: 20,034	
1964	**Michael A. Feighan**: 115,675	Joseph A. Cipollone: 39,747	
1962	**Michael A. Feighan**: 91,544	Leonard G. Richter: 37,325	
1960	**Michael A. Feighan**: 113,302	Leonard G. Richter: 53,845	
1958	**Michael A. Feighan**: 113,200	Malvern E. Schultz: 29,308	
1956	**Michael A. Feighan**: 105,562	John H. Ferguson: 56,209	
1954	**Michael A. Feighan**: 81,304	John H. Ferguson: 38,865	
1952	**Michael A. Feighan**: 109,211	John H. Ferguson: 58,271	
1950	**Michael A. Feighan**: 60,565	Paul W. Cassidy: 21,044	
1948	**Michael A. Feighan**: 64,241		
1946	**Michael A. Feighan**: 49,670	Walter E. Obert: 24,476	
1944	**Michael A. Feigan**: 75,218	A. R. McNamara: 23,945	
1942	Michael A. Feighan: 34,462	Harry T. Marshall: 14,001	Marie R. Sweeney: 7,289
1940	**Martin L. Sweeney**: 72,395	George Pillersdorf: 34,605	
1938	**Martin L. Sweeney**: 54,185	Thomas F. McCafferty: 22,775	
1936	**Martin L. Sweeney**: 54,295	Blase A. Buonpane: 23,367	John L. Mihelich: 22,158
1934	**Martin L. Sweeney**: 50,611	Joseph E. Cassidy: 21,952	A. Landy (C): 1,562; Sidney Yellen (S): 433
1932	**Martin L. Sweeney****: 52,933		John Fromholz (C): 650
1930	**Charles A. Mooney**: 42,123	Max D. Gustin: 13,824	
1928	**Charles A. Mooney**: 47,313	Oscar V. Hensley: 28,381	John Foley (W): 261
1926	**Charles A. Mooney**: 22,050		
1924	**Charles A. Mooney**: 34,173	Harvey Drucker: 22,507	C. E. Ruthenberg (W): 569
1922	Charles A. Mooney: 23,469	Miner G. Norton: 17,968	John G. Willett (S): 1,381; James Goward (SL): 198; James A. Murphy: 128
1920	Charles A. Mooney: 27,223	Miner G. Norton: 35,483	Nicholas P. Geiger: 711
