= Sweeney (name) =

Sweeney is a surname that is of Irish origin, derived from the Gaelic Mac Suibhne meaning "son of Suibhne". The Gaelic personal name Suibhne was originally a byname meaning "pleasant" or "well-disposed" and is associated with Clan Sweeney.

In the United States, the surname Sweeney can also be an Americanization of the French surname Choinière. This French surname is derived from choin, meaning white, and probably originated as an occupational name for a baker.

== People with the surname ==
=== Businesspeople ===
- Anne Sweeney (born 1957), Co-chair of Disney Media Networks and President of Disney–ABC Television Group
- Brody Sweeney, Irish entrepreneur
- Jack Sweeney, American programmer and entrepreneur

=== Criminals ===
- Craig Sweeney (born 1982), Welsh child sex offender
- Dennis Sweeney, murderer of American politician Allard K. Lowenstein in 1980
- Kevin Sweeney, British businessman convicted of murder in 2001 – see Kevin Sweeney case

=== Journalists ===
- Emily Sweeney, American journalist
- Fionnuala Sweeney (born 1965), Irish anchorwoman and reporter for CNN International
- Frances Sweeney (1908–1944), American journalist and activist

=== Jurists ===
- A. William Sweeney (1920–2003), Justice of the Supreme Court of Ohio
- Francis E. Sweeney (1934–2011), Justice of the Supreme Court of Ohio
- Nigel Sweeney (born 1954), UK barrister and High Court judge

=== Performers ===
- Alison Sweeney (born 1976), American television actress
- Bob Sweeney (TV director and producer) (1918–1992), American actor, director and producer
- Claire Sweeney (born 1971), English actress and singer
- D. B. Sweeney (born 1961), American actor
- George Sweeney (actor) (fl. 1971–present), British actor
- Joel Sweeney (1810–1860), American musician and early blackface minstrel performer
- Joseph Sweeney (actor), (1884–1963), American actor
- Julia Sweeney (born 1959), American actress and comedian
- Matt Sweeney (fl. 1989–present), American guitarist, singer and producer
- Sam Sweeney (born 1989), English folk musician
- Steve Sweeney (born 1949), American comedian
- Sunny Sweeney (born 1976), American country music singer
- Sydney Sweeney (born 1997), American actress
- Terry Sweeney (born 1969), American writer, comedian and actor

=== Politicians ===
- Bo Sweeney (1862–1917), American politician
- Dora M. Sweeney (1907–2001), American politician
- Francis J. Sweeney (1862–?), Canadian lawyer and politician
- Joseph Sweeney (Irish politician), (1897–1980), Irish politician
- Mark Sweeney (politician) (1959–2022), American politician
- Martin L. Sweeney (1885–1960), American politician
- Paul Sweeney (born 1989), MP and shadow Under-Secretary of State for Scotland
- Peter Barr Sweeny, an American lawyer and politician from New York
- Robert E. Sweeney (1924–2007), American politician
- Robert K. Sweeney (born 1949), American politician
- Shawn Sweeney, American politician
- Stephen M. Sweeney (born 1959), American politician
- Tara Sweeney (born 1973), American politician

=== Scientists ===
- Ed Sweeney, inventor of the Aerocar 2000 and Gemini Hummingbird
- Latanya Sweeney, American computer scientist and Harvard University professor
- Mary Ann Sweeney (born 1945), American physicist
- Randy Sweeney (born 1956), American research scientist

=== Sportspeople ===
- Antony Sweeney (born 1983), English footballer
- Bill Sweeney (first baseman) (1904–1957), baseball player
- Bill Sweeney (footballer) (1914–1973), Australian footballer
- Bill Sweeney (ice hockey) (1937–1991), Canadian ice hockey player
- Bill Sweeney (infielder) (1886–1948), American baseball player
- Bill Sweeney (pitcher) (1858–1903), baseball player
- Bob Sweeney (ice hockey) (born 1964), American retired National Hockey League player
- Brian Sweeney (born 1974), American former baseball player
- Calvin Sweeney (born 1955), American former National Football League player
- Ceri Sweeney (born 1980), Welsh rugby union footballer
- Charlie Sweeney (1863–1902), American Major League Baseball pitcher
- Daren Sweeney (born 1970), Montserratian cricketer
- Don Sweeney (born 1966), Canadian former National Hockey League player
- Ed Sweeney (baseball) (1888–1947), professional baseball player
- Ed Sweeney (American football) (1949–2017), American football coach and former player
- Eric Sweeney (1903–1968), English footballer
- Hank Sweeney (1915–1980), American professional baseball player
- Justin Sweeney, (born 1987), Australian rules footballer
- Kevin Sweeney (American football) (born 1963), American former football quarterback
- K.O. Sweeney (1894–1961), American boxer whose nickname was used by several other boxers
- Kyle Sweeney (born 1981), American lacrosse player
- Larry Sweeney (1981–2011), American professional wrestler
- Margaret Sweeney (swimmer) (born 1929/1930), former New Zealand long-distance swimmer
- Mark Sweeney (born 1969), American former Major League Baseball player
- Monroe Sweeney (1892–1950), American baseball umpire
- Neil Sweeney (born 1977), Australian rugby player
- Peter Henry Sweeney (born 1984), Scottish footballer
- Peter Sweeney (footballer) (fl. 1916–1929), Scottish-American footballer
- Ryan Sweeney (baseball), (born 1985), American professional baseball player
- Sam Sweeney (cricketer) (born 1990), English cricketer
- Sean Sweeney (born 1969), Scottish professional football player
- Sylvia Sweeney (born 1956), Canadian journalist, television producer and Olympic athlete
- Tommy Sweeney (born 1997), American football player
- Trey Sweeney (born 2000), American baseball player
- Walt Sweeney (1941–2013), American, professional American football player
- Zhaun Sweeney (born 1979), Montserratian cricketer

=== Others ===
- Antony G. Sweeney (born 1955), English director of the Australian Centre for the Moving Image
- Bill Sweeney (CEO), CEO of the International Foundation for Electoral Systems
- Bruce Sweeney (fl. 1995–present), Canadian film director
- Ciaran Sweeney (born 1971), Irish designer
- Daisy Sweeney (1920–2017), Canadian music teacher
- Eric Sweeney (composer) (1948–2020), Irish composer
- Jason Sweeney (1986–2003), American murder victim
- Madeline Amy Sweeney (1965–2001), a flight attendant on board American Airlines Flight 11 on 9/11
- Mary Sweeney, American film editor and film producer
- Matthew Sweeney (1951–2018), Irish poet
- Maureen Flavin Sweeney (1923–2023), Irish postmistress
- Mavis Sweeney (1909–1986), Australian hospital pharmacist
- Michelle Sweeney, American-born Canadian actress and musician
- Robert Augustus Sweeney (1853–1890), only African-American two-time recipient of the Medal of Honor
- Mark Sweeney (born 1967), American Businessman and embroidery digitizer

=== Disambiguation pages ===
- Charles Sweeney (disambiguation)
- James Sweeney (disambiguation), several people
- Jim Sweeney (disambiguation)
- John Sweeney (disambiguation)
- Michael or Mike Sweeney (disambiguation)
- Patrick Sweeney (disambiguation)
- Thomas Sweeney (disambiguation)
- Tim Sweeney (disambiguation)
- Walter Sweeney (disambiguation)
- William Sweeney (disambiguation)

== People with the given name ==
- Sweeney Schriner (1911–1990), Russian-born Canadian, professional ice hockey player
- Sweeney Young (born 1988), Australian actor

== Fictional characters ==
- Sweeney Todd, fictional barber and serial killer
- Sweeney, the anti-hero of several works by T. S. Eliot, including The Waste Land and the verse drama Sweeney Agonistes
- Moira/Max Sweeney, on the Showtime television network series The L Word
- Sinbad Sweeney, in the Channel 4 soap opera Brookside
- Mr. Sweeney, in Ned's Declassified School Survival Guide
- The Sweeney Sisters, a recurring musical SNL sketch from the 1980s featuring Candy Sweeney (Jan Hooks) and her sister Liz (Nora Dunn)
- Lieutenant Sweeney, in the 2005 film Dead Men Walking
- Sweeney, the main character in the Irish legend seen in Sweeney Astray
- Ram Sweeney, fictional character in the 1988 black comedy film Heathers, and it's musical and TV adaptations
- Mad Sweeney, fictional character in the series American Gods
- Conor MacSweeney (Alex Murphy), protagonist of the Irish film and television series The Young Offenders
- Reno Sweeney, the evangelist turned nightclub singer from Anything Goes

== See also ==
- List of Irish-language given names
- List of Scottish Gaelic given names
