= William J. Sweeney =

William J. Sweeney may refer to:

- Bill Sweeney (pitcher) (1858–1903), baseball pitcher
- William J. Sweeney (Wisconsin politician), member of the Wisconsin State Assembly

== See also ==
- William Sweeney (disambiguation)
