= General Sweeney =

General Sweeney may refer to:

- Charles Sweeney (1919–2004), U.S. Army Air Forces major general
- Joseph Sweeney (Irish politician) (1897–1980), Irish National Army general
- Walter C. Sweeney Sr. (1876–1963), U.S. Army major general
- Walter C. Sweeney Jr. (1909–1965), U.S. Air Force four-star general

== See also ==
- Thomas William Sweeny (1820–1892), Union Army brigadier general
- Joseph Henry Sweney (1845–1918), Iowa National Guard brigadier general
