= Mary Sweeney (disambiguation) =

Mary Sweeney is the name of:

- Mary Sweeney (born 1953), American film producer
- Mary Ann Sweeney (born 1945) American physicist
- Mary E. Sweeney (1879–1968), American educator, author and clubwoman

== See also ==
- Mary Sweeny (fl. 1880s–1910s or 1920s), American teacher who smashed windows of a train depot in 1897
