= Walter Sweeney =

Walter Sweeney may refer to:

- Walter Sweeney (politician) (born 1949), British politician
- Walter C. Sweeney Jr. (1909–1965), United States Air Force general
- Walter C. Sweeney Sr. (1876–1963), United States Army general
- Walt Sweeney (1941–2013), American football player
