= John Hobart Marble =

American attorney and government official

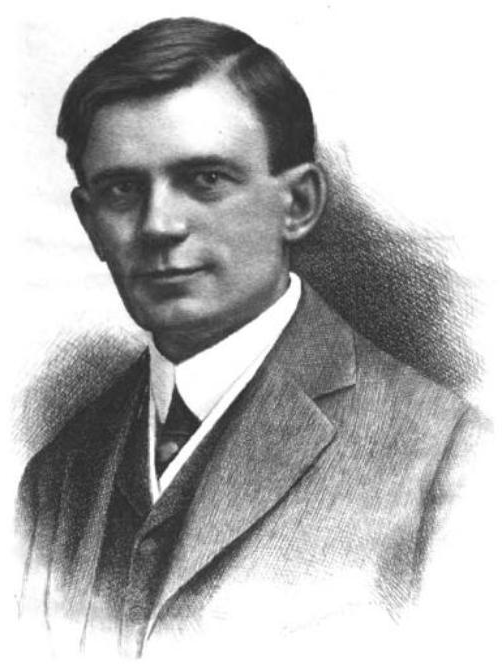
- Born: February 26, 1869; Ashland, Nebraska, U.S.
- Died: November 21, 1913 (aged 44); Washington, D.C., U.S.
- Education: University of Nebraska
- Occupation: Lawyer

Signature
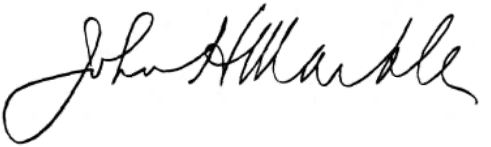

John Hobart Marble (February 26, 1869 – November 21, 1913) was an American attorney and government official, who was appointed to the Interstate Commerce Commission in March 1913 and served on the commission until his death eight months later.

== Early life ==
He was born on February 26, 1869, in Ashland, Nebraska, to Sarah and Andrew Marble. He later attended the University of Nebraska. He worked for a time as a linotype operator. He moved to California, and was admitted to the State Bar of California in 1903.

== Government career ==
While in San Francisco, he became acquainted with City Attorney Franklin Knight Lane, and when Lane was appointed and then confirmed to the Interstate Commerce Commission in 1906, followed Lane to Washington as his confidential clerk. Marble subsequently became the commission's attorney in charge of prosecutions, and then, in 1912, its secretary.

In 1912, Marble took a leave of absence from the commission to serve as council to the investigating committee of the Senate concerning the election of Senator William Lorimer of Illinois. Lorimer's election was shown to have been procured by bribery, and he was unseated.

In 1913, Lane, by now chairman of the commission as well as a commissioner, was appointed as Secretary of the Interior by President Woodrow Wilson. Wilson subsequently appointed Marble to the commission in Lane's place, with Edgar Erastus Clark becoming chairman. Marble was confirmed by the Senate on March 10, 1913. As commissioner, Marble concerned himself with the commission's prosecutions.

== Death ==
On November 20, 1913, Marble, the junior commissioner both in age and in time on the commission, was conducting an ICC hearing in Philadelphia, when he was taken ill with an attack of acute indigestion Marble journeyed to his Washington home. With Marble continuing to feel ill, Marble's family physician was called in the following day, but the commissioner died shortly after the doctor's arrival.

== Legacy ==
At a hearing on November 24, Chairman Clark described Marble as "a man of genial, helpful and splendid personality, indefatigable industry, sterling integrity, and broad fair-mindedness."
