= Charles Sweeney (disambiguation) =

Charles Sweeney or Sweeny is the name of:

In chronological order

- Charles Sweeney (1837–?), Confederate soldier who owned the Charles Sweeney Cabin, Appomattox Court House National Historical Park, Virginia, United States, in which General Fitzhugh Lee and his staff may have spent the night before Robert E. Lee's surrender to Ulysses S. Grant
- Charlie Sweeney (1863–1902), American Major League Baseball pitcher
- Charles Sweeny (1882–1963), American officer in several nations' militaries and soldier of fortune
- Buck Sweeney (1890–1955), American baseball player
- Charles Francis Sweeny (1909 or 1910–1993), American businessman instrumental in forming the Second World War Eagle Squadrons, nephew of the soldier of fortune
- Charles Sweeney (1919–2004), United States Air Force major general who piloted the bomber that dropped the second atomic bomb in World War II
- Charles Sweeney (judge), 20th century Australian judge - see Federal Court of Bankruptcy for a list of courts over which he presided
- Charles Sweeney, Chief Justice of the High Court of Tuvalu beginning 2016
