= William Sweeney =

William or Bill Sweeney may refer to:

- Bill Sweeney (first baseman) (1904–1957), baseball player
- Bill Sweeney (footballer) (1914–1973), Australian footballer
- Bill Sweeney (ice hockey) (1937–1991), Canadian ice hockey player
- Bill Sweeney (infielder) (1886–1948), American baseball player
- Bill Sweeney (pitcher) (1858–1903), baseball player
- Bill Sweeney (CEO), CEO of the International Foundation for Electoral Systems
- William Sweeney (composer) (born 1950), Scottish composer
- William J. Sweeney (Wisconsin politician), American politician
- William N. Sweeney (1832–1895), American politician
- William Sweeney (Medal of Honor) (1856–?), U.S. Navy sailor and Medal of Honor recipient
- W. Allison Sweeney (1851–1921), American newspaper writer, editor, and owner

== See also ==
- A. William Sweeney (1920–2003), soldier, lawyer and judge from Ohio
