= James Sweeney =

James Sweeney may refer to:

- James Johnson Sweeney (1900–1986), museum curator
- James Joseph Sweeney (1898–1968), American, Roman Catholic bishop
- James Sweeney (film editor) (1901–1957), American film editor
- James Sweeney (Medal of Honor) (1845–1931), Union Army soldier during the American Civil War
- James Sweeney (filmmaker) (born 1990), American screenwriter, director, and actor
- James G. Sweeney (1877–1917), Nevada attorney general and justice of the Supreme Court of Nevada
- James R. Sweeney II (born 1961), American attorney
- James M. Sweeney (fl. 1960s–2010s), healthcare entrepreneur
- James Sweeney (architect) (1868–1919), American architect
- James Monroe Sweeney (1892–1950), American baseball umpire

== See also ==
- Jim Sweeney (disambiguation)
- John James Sweeney (born 1927), Pennsylvania politician
