= Charles Sweeney Cabin =

- U.S. Historic district – Contributing property
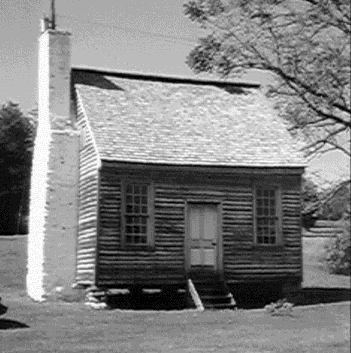
- Charles Sweeney cabin

- Location within Virginia Location within the United States
- Location: Appomattox County, Virginia
- Nearest city: Appomattox, Virginia
- Coordinates: 37°22′43″N 78°47′47″W
- Architect: National Park Service
- Visitation: 185,443 (2009)
- Part of: Appomattox Court House National Historical Park (ID66000827)
- Added to NRHP: October 15, 1966

The Charles Sweeney Cabin is a structure within the Appomattox Court House National Historical Park. It was registered in the National Park Service's database of Official Structures on June 26, 1989.

== History ==
Charles Sweeney was the uncle of Joel Sweeney, the person that popularized the five-string American banjo. In the 1840s the Sweeney clan lived on the stagecoach road northeast of Clover Hill, the name of the village now known as the Appomattox Court House National Historical Park. John Sweeney, a wheelwright and Charles' brother, lived in the old family home on the north bank of the Appomattox river with his wife and four children. When Joel was not touring the country entertaining he would stay at John's cabin. Just up the road the four children of John's, being nephews and nieces of Charles, could see their uncle's small cabin. Charles lived in the tiny cabin with his wife and two remaining children. Charles Sweeney's older son Robert, a left-handed fiddle player, lived in even a smaller cabin with his wife and baby daughter downhill from John. Charles Sweeney was born in 1794 as was his wife, Mary.

== Historical significance ==
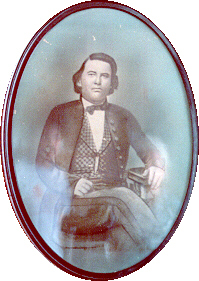
Charles Sweeney

Pictured is Charles Sweeney, born 1837 to Charles Sweeney and Mary A. Staples. This was his cabin at the time of the surrender. He was a Confederate soldier and recently married to Martha J. Bryant, daughter of James Bryant and Susan Layne. The National Park Service states the Charles Sweeney Cabin is meaningful by virtue of its association with the site of General Robert E. Lee's surrender to General Ulysses S. Grant. There is some evidence, in the form of a circa 1930 post card, which indicates that General Fitzhugh Lee and his staff stayed in this house the night before the surrender. It was originally built between 1830 and 1840 by Charles Sweeney, altered between 1940 and 1950, and restored in 1988 and 1994.

== Description ==
The Charles Sweeney Cabin is a single-story one-room structure with a loft. It is about twenty feet wide by about eighteen feet deep. The cabin is a post and beam hall house set on dry-laid fieldstone pier foundation, typical of what was in rural Virginia in the nineteenth century. The hall house consists of a "hall" or keeping room, that was the main room of the cabin. It served as an assortment of various rooms when needed; consisting of a living room, dining room, kitchen, workroom and bedroom. Cooking was done in a fireplace that was set to one end of the large room.

A rough, crudely quoined, fieldstone chimney extends to the second floor and above with brick. There are windows on the north, south and east sides. The south and east sides have single four-paneled doors. The interior of the cabin is in good condition. The roof is made of oak shakes, square-butted, and is supported at the eaves by a box cornice. The ends are covered with scribed end boards.

The one-room interior of the Charles Sweeney Cabin has a loft accessible in the northwest corner by a dog-leg stairway. The stairway has many of its original balusters. It also has original trim on the stringers, the structural member of the stairway that supports the treads and risers. The square newel and rail are formed from one piece of an oak branch. There is a small closet under the staircase that has its original four-paneled door with concave, quarter-circle corners on the raised panels.

All the inside of the "hall" room exposed to the eye is whitewashed. The door and window surrounds suggest the cabin was intended to be, but never was, plastered. The east side has a four-paneled door which is flanked by 6/6 double hanging sash windows. The east side has a single centered four-panel door on the main floor that opens directly into the multi-purpose keeping room. Above is a six-light (eight foot by twelve inch) casement. The north side has a single 6/6 double hanging window. Hewn oak L-formed corner posts and knee braces alternate with the secondary members made of pine.

== Sources ==
- Bradford, Ned, Battles and Leaders of the Civil War, Plume, 1989
- Catton, Bruce, A Stillness at Appomattox, Doubleday 1953, Library of Congress # 53-9982, ISBN 0-385-04451-8
- Catton, Bruce, This Hallowed Ground, Doubleday 1953, Library of Congress # 56-5960
- Davis, Burke, The Civil War: Strange & Fascinating Facts, Wings Books, 1960 & 1982, ISBN 0-517-37151-0
- Davis, Burke, To Appomattox - Nine April Days, 1865, Eastern Acorn Press, 1992, ISBN 0-915992-17-5
- Farrar, Stuart McDearmon, Historical Notes of Appomattox County, Virginia, self-published by Farrar, 1989, Original from the University of Virginia
- Featherston, Nathaniel Ragland, Appomattox County History and Genealogy, Genealogical Publishing Company, 1998, ISBN 0-8063-4760-0
- Gutek, Patricia, Plantations and Outdoor Museums in America's Historic South, University of South Carolina Press, 1996, ISBN 1-57003-071-5
- Hosmer, Charles Bridgham, Preservation Comes of Age: From Williamsburg to the National Trust, 1926-1949, Preservation Press, National Trust for Historic Preservation in the United States by the University Press of Virginia, 1981
- Howard, Blair et al., The Virginia Handbook, Hunter Publishing, Inc, 2005, ISBN 1-58843-512-1
- Kaiser, Harvey H., The National Park Architecture Sourcebook, Princeton Architectural Press, 2008, ISBN 1-56898-742-0
- Kennedy, Frances H., The Civil War Battlefield Guide, Houghton Mifflin Company, 1990, ISBN 0-395-52282-X
- Korn, Jerry et al., The Civil War, Pursuit to Appomattox, The Last Battles, Time-Life Books, 1987, ISBN 0-8094-4788-6
- Marvel, William, A Place Called Appomattox, UNC Press, 2000, ISBN 0-8078-2568-9
- Marvel, William, Lee's Last Retreat, UNC Press, 2006, ISBN 0-8078-5703-3
- McPherson, James M., Battle Cry of Freedom, Oxford University Press, 1988,
- National Park Service, Appomattox Court House: Appomattox Court House National Historical Park, Virginia, U.S. Dept. of the Interior, 2002, ISBN 0-912627-70-0
- Tidwell, William A., April '65: Confederate Covert Action in the American Civil War, Kent State University Press, 1995, ISBN 0-87338-515-2
- Tyler, Lyon Gardiner, Tyler's Quarterly Historical and Genealogical Magazine, 1952
- Weigley, Russel F., A Great Civil War: A Military and Political History, 1861-1865, Indiana University Press, 2000, ISBN 0-253-33738-0
