= Tim Sweeney (disambiguation) =

Tim Sweeney (born 1970) is a game developer and founder of Epic Games.

Tim Sweeney may also refer to:

- Tim Sweeney (DJ), disc jockey and host of Beats in Space
- Tim Sweeney (ice hockey) (born 1967), American ice hockey player
- Tim Sweeney (hurler) (1929–2018), Irish hurler who played for Galway
- Tim Sweeney (baseball) (born 1980), American baseball player
