= Mike Sweeney (disambiguation) =

Mike Sweeney (born 1973) is an American baseball player.

Mike or Michael Sweeney may also refer to:

- Mike Sweeney (DJ) (born 1947), British musician and radio DJ
- Mike Sweeney (musician), American musician
- Mike Sweeney (soccer) (born 1959), Canadian soccer player
- Mike M. Sweeney, member of the Ohio House of Representatives from Cleveland
- Michael Sweeney (athlete), Irish-American track and field athlete
- Michael Sweeney (California politician) (born 1950), mayor of Hayward, California
- Michael A. Sweeney, member of the Ohio House of Representatives from Cleveland
