= Edgar E. Clark =

American attorney, railway union official and government employee

Edgar Erastus Clark
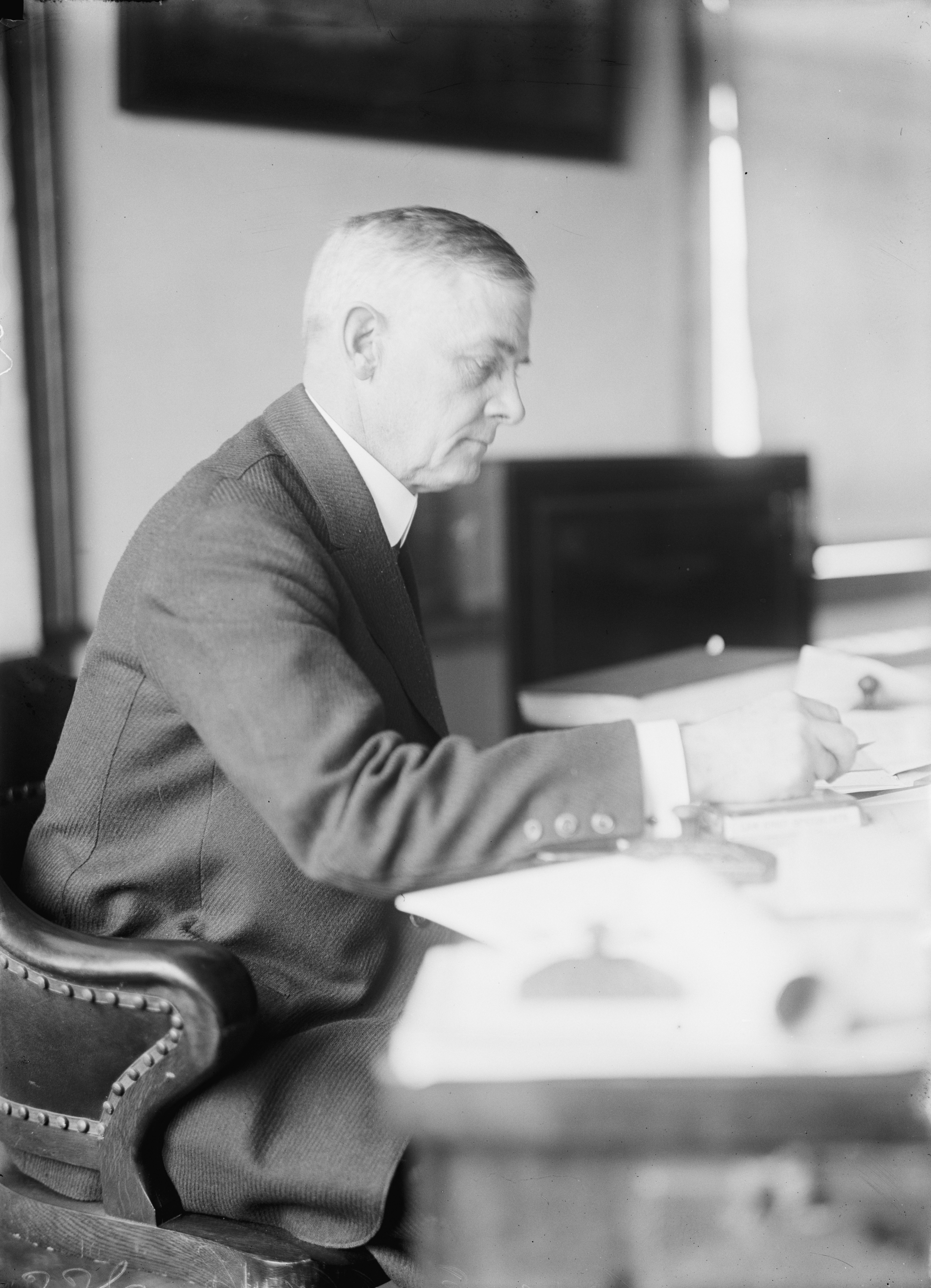
- Clark in 1915

Commissioner of the Interstate Commerce Commission
- In office 1906–1921

Grand Chief Conductor of the Order of Railway Conductors
- In office 1890–1906

Personal details
- Born: February 18, 1856 Lima, New York, US
- Died: December 1, 1930 (aged 74) Monrovia, California, US
- Education: Genesee Wesleyan Seminary; Williams College

Edgar Erastus Clark (February 18, 1856 – December 1, 1930) was an American attorney, railway union official, and government employee. The chief executive of the Order of Railway Conductors for more than 15 years, Clark served on the Interstate Commerce Commission from 1906 to 1921, and was its chairman from 1913 to 1914 and 1918 to 1921.

== Railway career ==
Edgar E. Clark was born in Lima, New York, on February 18, 1856. His father died when he was six, leaving him to be raised by his mother.

Clark attended school at the Genesee Wesleyan Seminary, remaining there until 1872. After leaving school, Clark headed west in search of work and adventure, landing in Austin, Minnesota, where he found a job as a brakeman on the Burlington, Cedar Rapids, and Northern Railway.

Clark attended Williams College. He would later receive a law degree.

In 1876 he moved along to points still further west, settling in Ogden, Utah, which would become his hometown.

Clark married the former Lavinia Jenkins, of Ogden, Utah, in September 1880. The couple would have four children during their first ten years of marriage, two girls and two boys. Clark took a position on the Denver and Rio Grande Western Railroad, winning promotion from brakeman to railroad conductor in 1884.

Clark became active in the Order of Railway Conductors (ORC), the fraternal benefit society of conductors, and was elected Grand Senior Conductor of the ORC at its annual convention in Denver in 1888. In 1890 became Grand Chief Conductor, the chief executive of the Order. Clark would hold that position until 1906.

He was succeeded as president on September 1, 1906, by Austin B. Garretson.

== Governmental career ==
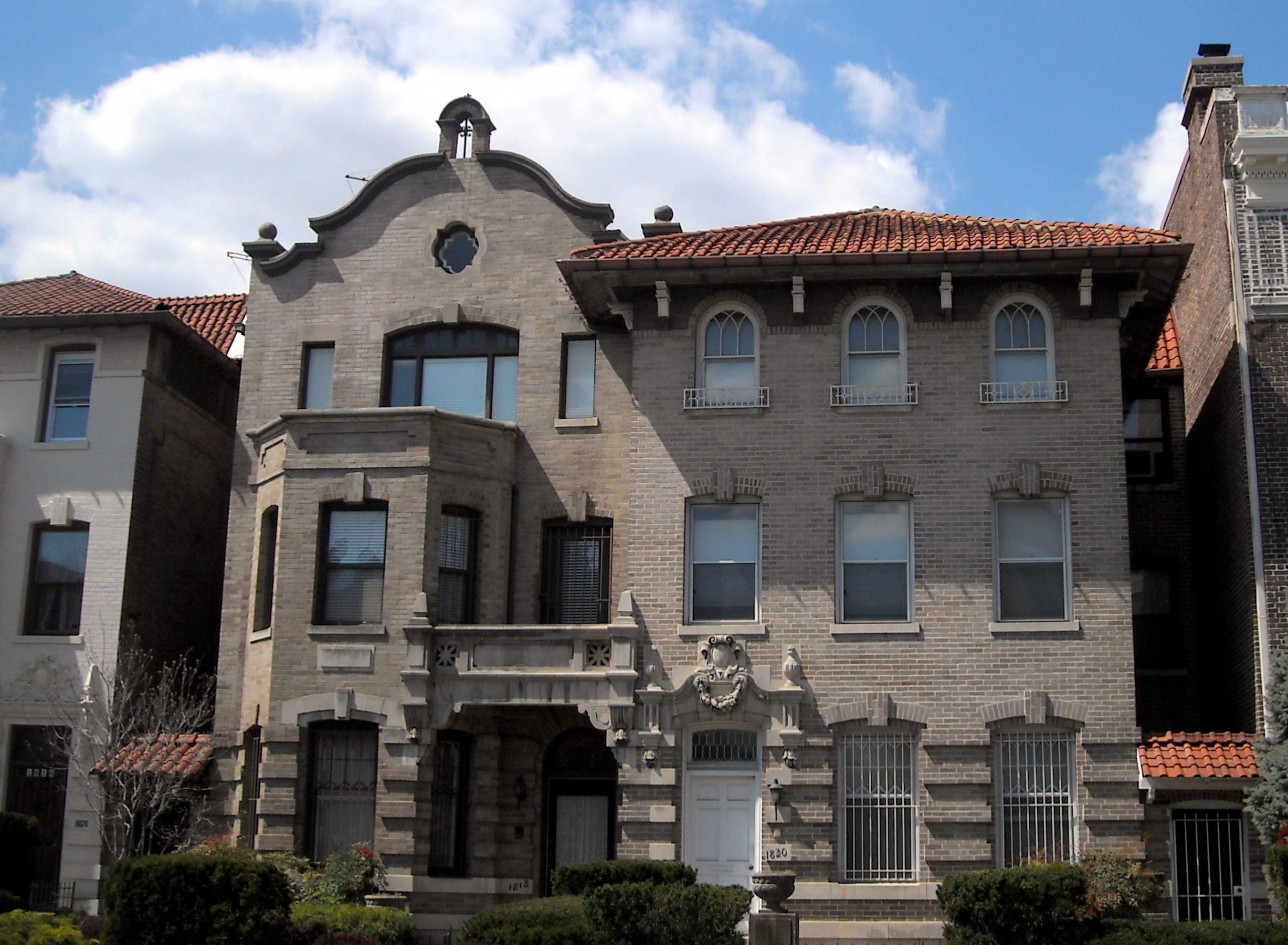
Clark's former residence (left) in the Dupont Circle residence of Washington, D.C.

Clark involved himself in lobbying, and received credit for the 1898 enactment of a Mediation and Arbitration Act, which provided for a permanent board to settle disputes between railways and their employees. In 1902, President Theodore Roosevelt, apparently impressed by a speech he had given to a railwaymen's convention which Roosevelt had attended, named Clark (a Republican in politics) to the Coal Arbitration Commission to settle an ongoing strike, an appointment which excited considerable comment.

In 1906, Roosevelt nominated Clark to one of two new seats on the Interstate Commerce Commission created by the Hepburn Act. Clark received a recess appointment from Roosevelt and was sworn in on July 31, 1906. He was confirmed by the Senate on December 13, 1906. President William Howard Taft attempted to reappoint Clark, but his confirmation was held up in a dispute between the lame-duck President and Congress after the 1912 elections, with the Senate determined to deny Taft any further appointments. Nonetheless, Clark was immediately reappointed as Commissioner by the new President, Woodrow Wilson, on March 5, 1913, and was confirmed by the Senate the same day. The following day, the ICC commissioners elected Clark as chairman, filling out the remainder of the one-year term which had been left vacant by the resignation of ICC Chairman Franklin Knight Lane, who had been confirmed as Secretary of the Interior.

In 1918, Clark was again elected Commission chairman. While the chairmanship had been rotating, in view of Clark's long service, the practice was abandoned, and Clark remained chairman until his 1921 resignation.

== Later life ==
In 1921, Clark resigned from the Commission to enter the practice of commercial law. It was stated that the reasons for his resignation were to alleviate the stress of his position, and to make provision for his family.

In 1929, Clark retired from the firm of Clark & Laroe and in June moved to Monrovia, California, where he died on December 1, 1930, leaving a widow, Agnes Clark, and three sons and three daughters.
