= Thomas Sweeney =

Thomas Sweeney may refer to:

- Thomas Sweeney (glassmaker) (1806–1890), Irish-born glass manufacturer and politician in Wheeling before creation of West Virginia
- Thomas Sweeney (Connecticut politician) (1933–2007), member of the Connecticut House of Representatives
- Thomas Sweeney (West Virginia politician) (1903–1973), member of the West Virginia Senate
- Tom Sweeney, member of Kerfuffle
- Thomas Sweeney (rugby union) (c. 1929–2017), rugby union player who represented Australia
- Tom Sweeney (rugby league) (1897–1964), Australian rugby league player
- Thomas 'Sinbad' Sweeney, a character in Brookside

== See also ==
- Thomas William Sweeny (1820–1892), Irish soldier who served in the American army
