= James M. Sweeney =

Healthcare entrepreneur

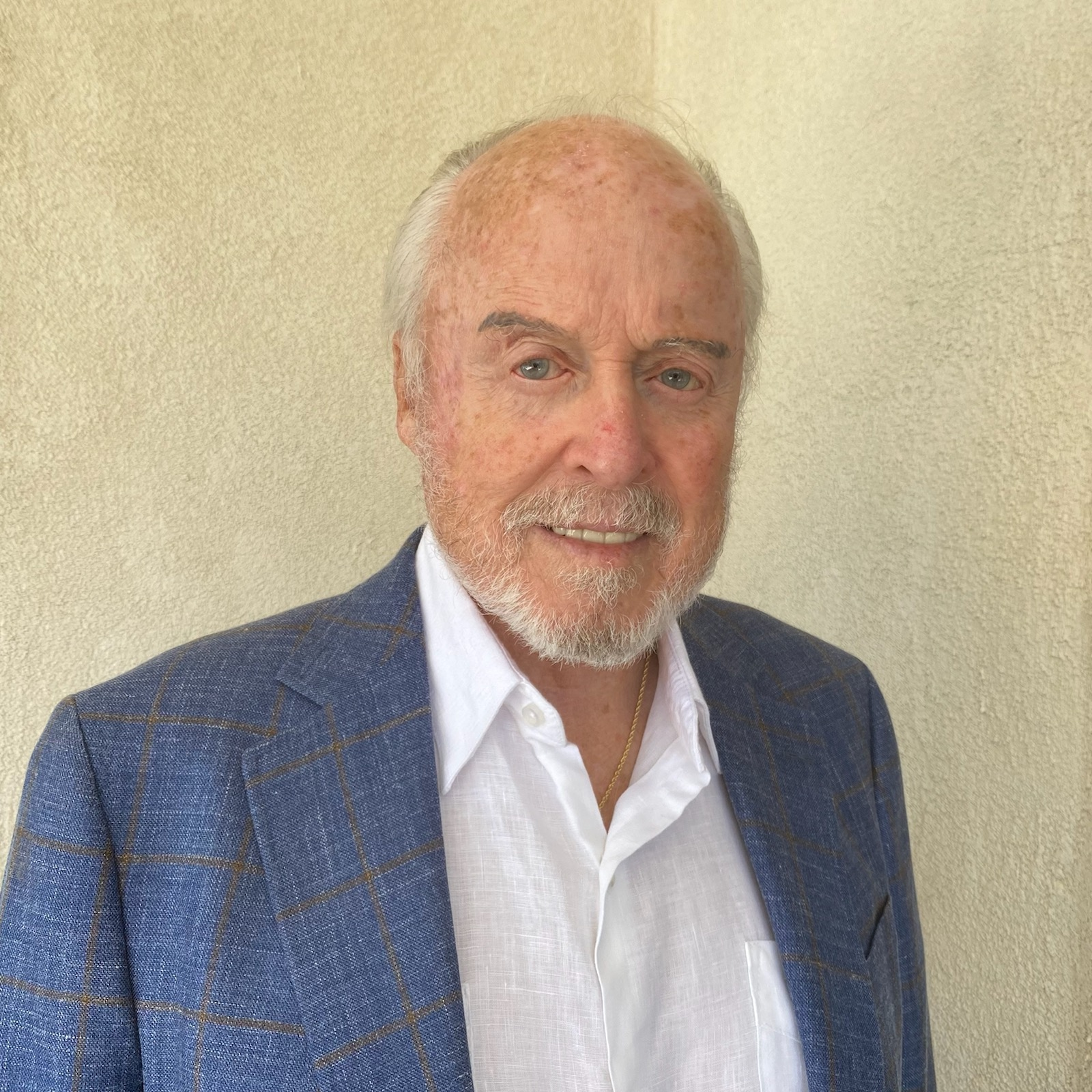
James M. Sweeney

James M. Sweeney was a serial entrepreneur who started 14 healthcare companies with original ideas, none of which failed. He raised $2 billion in capital and generated more than $30 billion in exit value. His companies have saved or extended the lives of millions of people. He passed away on June 17, 2026.

In his final years, he turned to humanitarian work by founding Kids Set Free, Inc, a 501(c)(3) foundation with a mission dedicated to supporting agencies and organizations that are combatting Child Sexual Exploitation. It later merged with the nonprofit OUR Rescue, where Sweeney served as a Board Member.

His book, Creative Insecurity: Lean Into the Unknown and Unleash Your Inner Misfit was released by Post Hill Press (Distributed by Simon & Schuster) on December, 10 2024. It was co-authored with Rhonda Lauritzen.

== Early life and education ==
When Sweeney was 15, he worked in a hospital supply room. After graduating from high school in San Diego, California, Sweeney joined the United States Army Medical Corps, as a combat medic. In 1969, Sweeney graduated from San Diego State University and, shortly after, was hired by Baxter Travenol (later renamed Baxter, International).

== Career and ventures founded (partial list) ==
James M. Sweeney worked in the healthcare industry for over six decades and founded fourteen health care companies with original ideas. His companies were responsible for extending or saving the lives of millions of people and freeing people from confines of the hospital. The New York Times called him a “pioneer in his field.” The Wall Street Journal called his initial idea, “visionary” and “disarmingly simple.” In a special report on healthcare, The Economist wrote that, "James Sweeney is one of the few entrepreneurs to have achieved commercial success, not once but half a dozen times, with businesses selling personal medical devices."

Before founding his first company, he worked for several healthcare companies including Baxter International and McGaw Laboratories.

Companies founded (partial list):

- Caremark, Inc., founded in 1979 to offer home healthcare services: According to an article in the New York Times, Sweeney founded Caremark (originally Home Health Care of America) after he “... realized that a considerable number of hospital patients requiring intravenous therapy and nutrition did not really need to be hospitalized.” Furthermore, “parenteral, or nondigestive, feeding could be done at home … freeing patients and their insurers from uncomfortable, expensive hospital stays.” The company was profitable in six months and within seven years had opened 75 centers around the U.S. On August 3, 1987, Caremark was sold to Baxter Laboratories Inc. for approximately $600 million. CVS ultimately acquired Caremark in 2007 for $24 billion.
- Coram Healthcare, founded in 1994: A specialty home infusion services and tube feeding company created as a leveraged buyout (LBO). Coram was eventually sold to CVS in 2013 for $2.1 billion.
- CardioNet (BioTelemetry), founded in 2000: CardioNet ultimately sold to Philips in 2021 for $2.8 billion.
- Clarify Medical, founded in 2017: While Jim was not the founder of Clarify Medical, he rebranded it, raised venture capital and got the product to market. This was the first company to provide Narrow Band UVB therapy, used to treat chronic skin diseases such as psoriasis, vitiligo and eczema through a “smart” patient handheld device, without the need for multiple weekly visits to the physician’s office. This is done while remaining supervised by the physician, linked through their smartphones. Recently, 7 Wire Ventures invested $18 million in the company.

== Kids Set Free and OUR Rescue ==
Sweeney was the founder and Executive Chairman of Kids Set Free, a 501 (c)(3) foundation dedicated to "supporting agencies and organizations that are combatting Child Sexual Exploitation." Later, this nonprofit merged with OUR Rescue which provides essential services to people who have been or could be trafficked and exploited. While reliable trafficking numbers are nearly impossible to determine, the problem occurs in all 50 states. The United Nations reports that most child victims in the United States are trafficked for sexual exploitation, and experts agree that the problem is both vast and unconscionable.

== History of raising capital ==
In his first business, Caremark, Sweeney sought and received backing from the prestigious Silicon Valley venture capital firm, Kleiner, Perkins, Caufield, and Byers.

In all, he successfully took four companies public, led an LBO resulting in a 650% return to investors and 77% IRR in less than four years, raised over $2 billion in financing for his various companies including $500 million in venture capital, $700 million in debt financing and $400 million in two IPOs. The $2 billion invested resulted in $30 billion exit value. He has been involved in buying, selling, or taking public over 20 healthcare product and service companies.

== Recognitions ==
Sweeney received two Ernst & Young Entrepreneur of the Year awards (1995 and 2004) as well as being inducted into the World Hall of Fame. He was also honored to be named “Alumnus of the year” from his alma mater, San Diego State University. From the Corporate Directors Forum, he received the “Lifetime achievement award.” He was also the recipient of Triple Tree iAward for Connected Health.

He was acknowledged as the founder of the multi-billion-dollar home infusion therapy industry, having founded Caremark, the industry pioneer and leader.

Jim’s serial entrepreneurship, was also the subject of a laudatory, Page One Wall Street Journal article which cited his “strong track record,” “dogged persistence,” and “clairvoyance.” Much of his repeated success has been attributed to vision. Sanford R. Robertson, chairman of Robertson Stephens and one of the original fundraisers for Kleiner Perkins, said, “Jim can see farther into the future than most people do, and he’s been able to take advantage of it.”

== Philosophy and management style ==
The Wall Street Journal noted that Sweeney managed, “with an air of democracy at his companies that has won the loyalty and affection of his employees.” Sweeney was known for an attitude of embracing failure, while taking calculated risks. He said, “You have to look at failure as a chance to adjust your swing,” [Wall Street Journal] More recently, he has taken to calling this mindset, “failing your way to success” and “being insecure about what you don’t know.”
