= Patrick Sweeney =

Patrick Sweeney may refer to:

- Patrick Sweeney (gunsmith), American, gunsmith and author
- Patrick Sweeney (rowing) (born 1952), British Olympic Games rowing coxswain
- Patrick Sweeney (politician) (1939–2020), American, member of the Ohio Senate and member of the Ohio House of Representatives
- Patrick Sweeney (entrepreneur) (born 1970), American entrepreneur
- Pat Sweeney (born 1954), American, member of the Wyoming House of Representatives
