= John Sweeney =

John Sweeney or Sweeny may refer to:

== Politics and law ==
- John Sweeney (Australian politician) (1863–1947), member of the New South Wales Legislative Assembly
- John Sweeney (Canadian politician) (1931–2001), Canadian, politician and educator
- John Sweeney (labor leader) (1934–2021), American president of AFL-CIO
- John Sweeney (Ohio politician) (1924–2016), member of the Ohio House of Representatives
- John A. Sweeney (born 1941), American politician in the New Jersey General Assembly
- John Bernard Sweeney (1911–1981), judge of the Australian Industrial Court
- John E. Sweeney (born 1955), U.S. Representative from New York
- John James Sweeney (1927–2026), American politician in Pennsylvania
- John Sweeny (judge) (1949–2025), American judge in New York

== Criminals ==
- John Sweeney (1956 or 1957 - 14 August 2026) , English serial killer also known as the Canal killer, murdered American national Melissa Halstead and British national Paula Fields, both of whom he dated. Halstead was murdered in Amsterdam in 1990 and her torso was recovered and later identified in 2008. Fields went missing and was killed in 2001 with her body parts being found in London Canals. He was the subject of the book Living with a Serial Killer (2017) and TV adaptation Until I Kill You (2024)
- John Thomas Sweeney (born 1956), former boyfriend and killer of American actress Dominique Dunne

== Writers ==
- John Sweeney (journalist) (born 1958), British investigative journalist and writer
- John A. H. Sweeney (1930–2007), American museum curator and author
- John J. Sweeney (professional speaker) (born 1965), American keynote speaker and author

== Other people ==
- John Sweeney (footballer), Scottish footballer, played for Dunfermline Athletic FC in the 1961 Scottish Cup Final
- John Sweeney (police officer) of the Metropolitan Police Service, detective superintendent in charge of Operation Withern
- John Sweeny (bishop) (1821–1901), Canadian Roman Catholic bishop
- John Sweeny, settler for whom the town of Sweeny, Texas, US, was named

== See also ==
- John Swinney (born 1964), Scottish politician
- Jack Sweeney (born c. 2002), American programmer
