= Jim Sweeney =

Jim Sweeney may refer to:

== Sports ==
- Jim Sweeney (American football, born 1929) (1929–2013), American college football coach
- Jim Sweeney (American football, born 1962) (1962–2022), American professional football player and assistant coach
- Jim Sweeney (basketball), American basketball player

== Others ==
- Jim Sweeney (actor) (born 1956), Scottish actor
- Jim Sweeney (comedian) (born 1955), English actor and comedian

== See also ==
- Jimmy Sweeney (1922–1992), American singer
- Jimmy Sweeney, Irish musician, based in Canada, and member of Barley Bree
- James Sweeney (disambiguation)
