= Craig Sweeney =

Craig John Sweeney (born 1981 in South Glamorgan) is a Welsh child sex offender, from Newport, Gwent.

Public criticism of Sweeney's sentence voiced by Home Secretary John Reid prompted the House of Commons Constitutional Affairs Committee to recommend that the Ministerial Code be amended with guidelines to govern the public comments of ministers about individual judges to reinforce the provisions within the Constitutional Reform Act 2005.

The Committee wrote: "The Sweeney case was the first big test of whether the new relationship between the Lord Chancellor [i.e. Lord Falconer] and the judiciary was working properly, and it is clear that there was a systemic failure."

In 2008, Lord Phillips, the Lord Chief Justice of England and Wales, announced that in response to "widespread inaccurate media coverage" of Sweeney's sentencing, five judges were being trained to be the first official media spokesmen for the judiciary.

== Crime ==
Craig Sweeney was found guilty of the abduction and sexual assault of a three-year-old girl. He was known to the victim's family, whom he had befriended weeks before the crime. Sweeney was released on licence in late 2005 after serving a term in jail for indecently assaulting a six-year-old in April 2003. While on licence, he was accused of inappropriately touching a child's bottom, but the police and probation workers did not return him to prison, despite his "risk of harm" being raised to "high".

Sweeney kidnapped the girl from the Rumney area of Cardiff on 2 January 2006, two days after his licence had expired. He drove her to his Newport flat where he was living on licence. He was caught the following day when he crashed his car during a high-speed chase initiated after Sweeney jumped a red light. The girl, who was in the crash with him, suffered minor injuries.

Sweeney admitted to four charges of kidnapping, three of sexual assault and one of dangerous driving. His defence counsel said he had "shown remorse when arrested and was distressed at the depravity at what he had done".

== Imprisonment ==
He was sentenced to life in prison with a tariff of 12 years, and would be eligible to be considered for parole after five years and 108 days from the date of sentencing. The judge, John Griffith Williams, QC, stated that the sentence he would have imposed had he passed a determinate sentence would have been one of 12 years, adding that the appropriate sentence after trial would have been 18 years. From that he deducted one-third due to Sweeney's co-operation and his guilty plea at the outset. Had there been a determinate sentence of 12 years (rather than the life sentence the judge imposed) Sweeney would have been released on licence after 6 years. From that the judge deducted the time Sweeney had spent in custody awaiting trial which meant Sweeney could not be considered for parole until he had served five years and 108 days. On 10 July 2006, it was decided the case would not be referred to the Court of Appeal, as the sentence had been calculated in accordance with the legislation enacted by the-then Labour government. The victim's mother said she was "Gut-wrenchingly sick" at the decision.

=== Public criticism ===
The sentence created a controversy in Wales largely because it was reported that the sentence was "less than six years". John Reid called the sentence "unduly lenient". Then- Prime Minister Tony Blair backed Reid's criticism. Nick Clegg said it was "rank hypocrisy for Reid to blame judges for sentences which are a direct consequence of recent legislation introduced by this government". Lord Morris of Aberavon QC, attorney general in the late 1990s, said he would have been "extremely annoyed" by Reid's intervention. Ex-High Court judge Sir Oliver Popplewell said: "I think it's unwise for the home secretary to poke his nose into legal affairs." Lord Ramsbotham urged Blair "to shut up" and accused him of enacting policy changes which caused more problems than they solved. The girl's mother has called for tougher sentences.
