= Walter C. Sweeney Jr. =

United States Air Force general

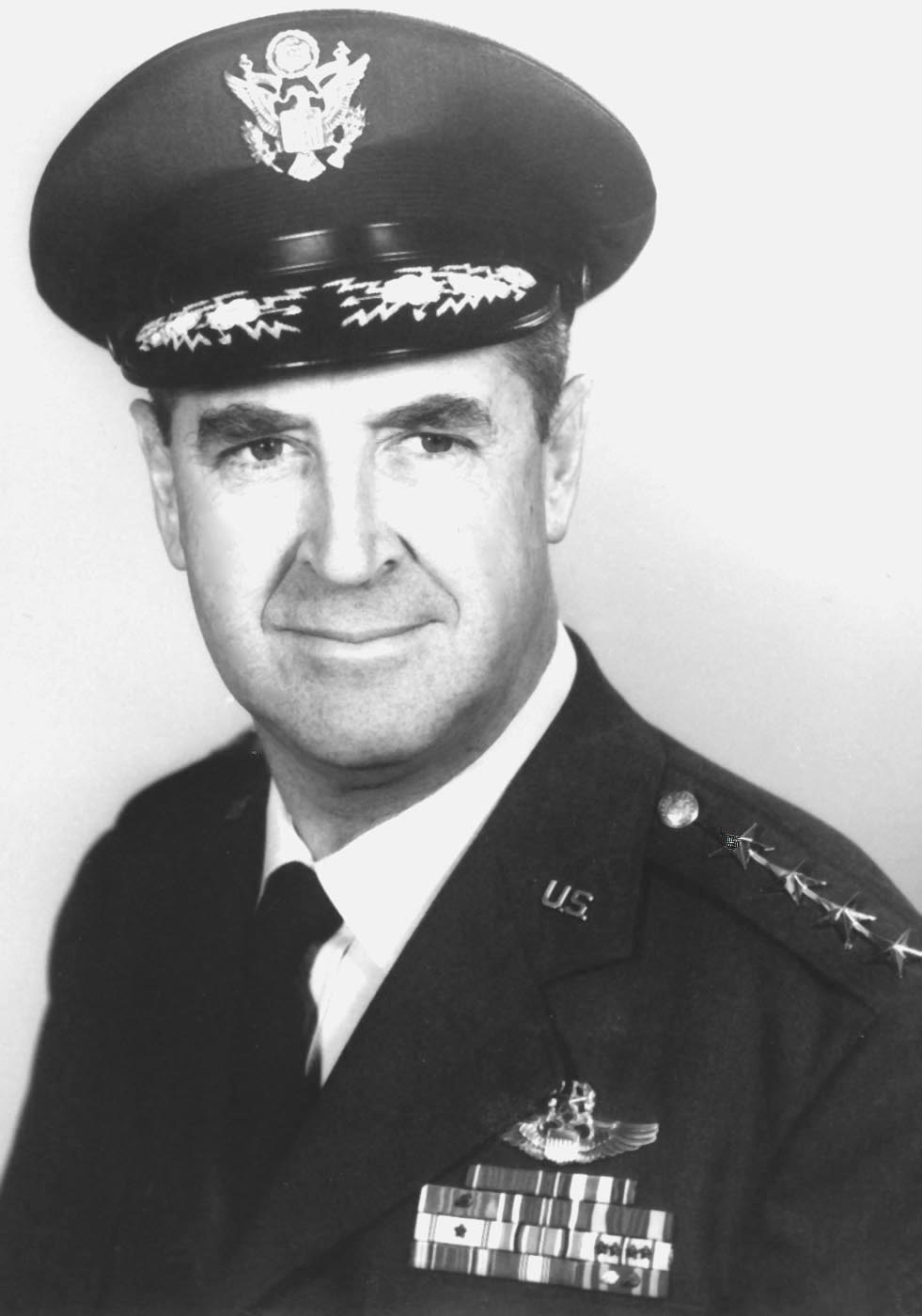
- Born: July 23, 1909; Wheeling, West Virginia, U.S.
- Died: December 22, 1965 (aged 56); Homestead Air Reserve Base, Florida, U.S.
- Military career
- Allegiance: United States of America
- Branch: United States Air Force
- Service years: 1930–1965
- Rank: General
- Commands: Tactical Air Command
- Conflicts: World War II
- Awards: Distinguished Service Cross; Silver Star; Distinguished Flying Cross; Air Medal

General Walter Campbell Sweeney Jr. (July 23, 1909 – December 22, 1965) was a four-star general in the United States Air Force (USAF) who served as commander of Tactical Air Command.

== Biography ==
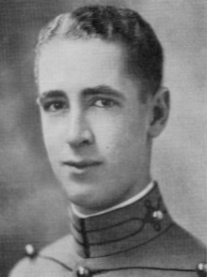
As a West Point cadet

A native of Wheeling, West Virginia, he was born in 1909. His father, Walter Campbell Sweeney Sr., was a United States Army major general and author of the influential Military Intelligence: A New Weapon of War. Sweeney Junior graduated from the United States Military Academy and was commissioned a second lieutenant of infantry in June 1930. In October 1934, he entered primary flying school at Randolph Field, Texas, with subsequent graduation from the advanced flying school in October 1935, at Kelly Field, Texas. His first operational assignment was with the Eighth Attack Squadron of the Third Attack Group at Barksdale Field, Louisiana.

In June 1939, Sweeney joined the Fifth Bomb Group in Hawaii and later transferred to the 11th Bomb Group as commanding officer of the 431st Bomb Squadron. He commanded a United States Army Air Forces (USAAF) Task Group during the Battle of Midway in June 1942. In July 1942, he became the air officer for the Theater Group, Operations Division of the War Department General Staff in Washington, D.C.

In July 1944, Sweeney was assigned to the 73rd Bomb Wing and moved with this unit from Colorado Springs, Colorado, to the Pacific area, serving as chief of staff and later deputy commander. While with the wing in the Marianas, he participated in the first unprecedented low-level attack with B-29 Superfortress bombers against the Japanese. On a later mission he lost his aircraft, paddled ashore in a life raft, and returned to his island base. In July 1945, he became director of plans of the Strategic Air Force, Pacific Ocean Area, Guam. After the war he served as a member of the Joint War Plans Committee for the USAAF in Washington, D.C., until July 1946 when he became an instructor at the National War College.

In October 1947, Sweeney was assigned to the Office of the Assistant Secretary of the Air Force, and the following year was named director of plans for Strategic Air Command with headquarters at Omaha, Nebraska.

In April 1953, he was assigned to command the Fifteenth Air Force at March Air Force Base, California. In June 1954, while commander of this strategic bomber force, he led a trio of B-47 Stratojet bombers in history's first non-stop flight of jet bombers across the Pacific Ocean.

For six years, from August 1955 until September 1961, Sweeney commanded the Eighth Air Force at Westover Air Force Base, Massachusetts.

In October 1961 Sweeney was promoted to four-star rank and assumed command of Tactical Air Command with headquarters at Langley Air Force Base, Virginia. He retired from the USAF on August 1, 1965, and died of cancer on December 22, 1965.

Sweeney was awarded the Distinguished Service Cross, Air Force Distinguished Service Medal, Silver Star, Legion of Merit with oak leaf cluster, Distinguished Flying Cross and Air Medal. He was rated a command pilot.

== See also ==
- List of commanders of Tactical Air Command
