= Walter C. Sweeney Sr. =

United States Army general

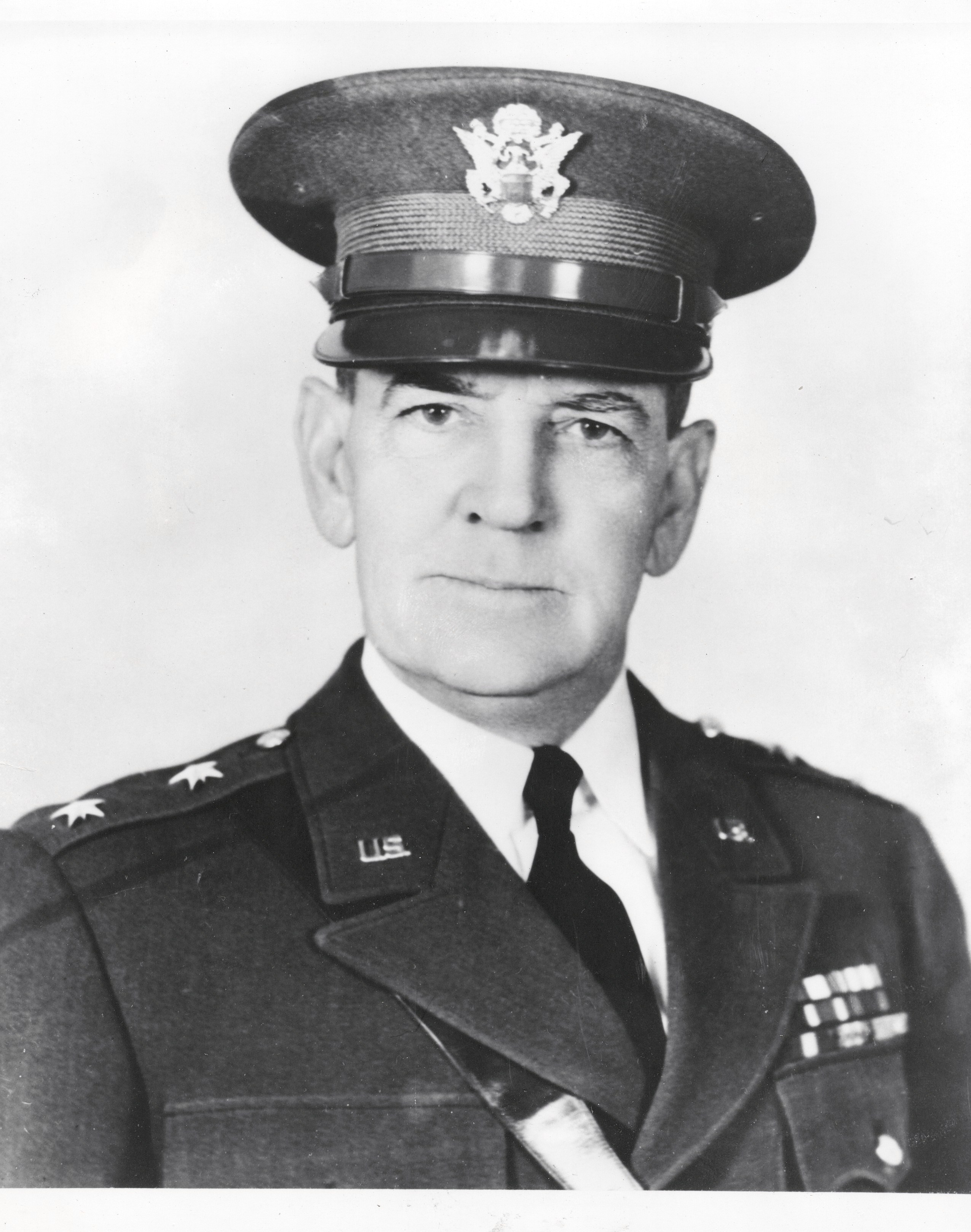
- Major General Walter C. Sweeney (photograph taken c. 1938–1940)
- Born: November 16, 1876; Wheeling, West Virginia, U.S.
- Died: April 9, 1963 (aged 85) San Francisco, California, US
- Allegiance: United States
- Branch: United States Army
- Service years: 1898–1943
- Rank: Major general
- Commands: U.S. Army War College; Sixth Infantry Brigade; 3rd Infantry Division; California State Guard
- Conflicts: Spanish–American War; Philippine–American War; Pancho Villa Expedition; World War I World War II
- Awards: Army Distinguished Service Medal; Silver Star; National Order of the Legion of Honor

Walter Campbell Sweeney Sr. (November 16, 1876 – April 9, 1963) was a United States Army major general who served in the Spanish–American War, Philippine–American War, Pancho Villa Expedition, World War I, and World War II.

== Early life ==
Sweeney was born on November 16, 1876, in Wheeling, West Virginia, the son of Andrew J. and Maria Sweeney. Andrew J. Sweeney was the founder of Wheeling Electric and a multi-term mayor of Wheeling, West Virginia. Walter Sweeney was educated locally and, in notable contrast to most senior officers of his time, never attended the U.S. Military Academy at West Point.

== Military career ==
With the outbreak of the Spanish–American War in 1898, Sweeney enlisted as a private in the 1st West Virginia Volunteer Infantry, a unit that saw no action during the war. By the war's end Sweeney had been commissioned as a second lieutenant.

In February 1900, Second Lieutenant Sweeney received orders sending him to the Philippines. During his service in the Philippines, Sweeney was involved in campaigns against the Pulahan in 1906 and 1907 and in suppressing the Moro Rebellion in Mindanao in 1910 and 1911. The 1910 United States census shows Captain Sweeney in quarters at Ludlow Barracks, Mindanao, Philippines along with his wife, Anne Sweeney (age 30), and eldest daughter, Elizabeth J. Sweeney (age 4).

During the 1916–1917 Pancho Villa Expedition (a.k.a. Mexican Expedition) Sweeney served as a captain on the staff of General John J. Pershing.

Sweeney authored a pamphlet entitled Sketching Methods that was published in 1917. Intended for military officers tasked with quickly rendering tactical maps, Sweeney's introduction to the pamphlet states that its purpose "is to simplify instruction in the subject and to clear away the mathematics and the mystery which seem to cling to it." The front matter of Sketching Methods identifies Sweeney as a captain in the Twenty-first United States Infantry stationed at the Presidio of San Francisco. The full text of Sketching Methods is available via HathiTrust.

Following the entry of the United States into World War I, Sweeney was promoted to the temporary rank of lieutenant colonel (August 20, 1917) and, near the end of the war, to the rank of colonel (October 24, 1918) in the National Army. During the war Sweeney was in charge of press relations and military censorship and was instrumental in the founding of the Stars and Stripes military newspaper. Sweeney saw combat during the war, winning the Army Distinguished Service Medal, the Silver Star, and the French National Order of the Legion of Honor.

Citation for the Army Distinguished Service Medal:

Army Distinguished Service Medal Awarded for actions during the World War I

The President of the United States of America, authorized by Act of Congress, July 9, 1918, takes pleasure in presenting the Army Distinguished Service Medal to Colonel (Infantry) Walter C. Sweeney, United States Army, for exceptionally meritorious and distinguished services to the Government of the United States, in a duty of great responsibility during World War I. As Chief of Staff of the 28th Division, Colonel Sweeney rendered conspicuously valuable services in the Meuse-Argonne offensive. In the capture of the strong enemy positions at le Chene Tondu, Apremont, Chatel-Chehery, and Hill No. 244, by his marked ability and tactical knowledge he proved a material factor in the successes achieved during these important operations.

General Orders: War Department, General Orders No. 59 (1919)
Action Date: World War I
Service: Army
Rank: Colonel
Company: Chief of Staff
Division: 28th Division, American Expeditionary Forces

Citation for the Silver Star:

Silver Star Awarded for actions during the World War I

By direction of the President, under the provisions of the act of Congress approved July 9, 1918 (Bul. No. 43, W.D., 1918), Colonel (Infantry) Walter C. Sweeney, United States Army, is cited by the Commanding General, American Expeditionary Forces, for gallantry in action and a silver star may be placed upon the ribbon of the Victory Medals awarded him. Colonel Sweeney distinguished himself by gallantry in action while serving as Chief of Staff, 28th Division, American Expeditionary Forces, in action near Apremont, France, 28 September 1918, in voluntarily going out in the open under heavy shell fire in order to rally and encourage the troops.

General Orders: GHQ, American Expeditionary Forces, Citation Orders No. 4 (June 3, 1919)
Action Date: 28-Sep-18
Service: Army
Rank: Colonel
Company: Chief of Staff
Division: 28th Division, American Expeditionary Forces

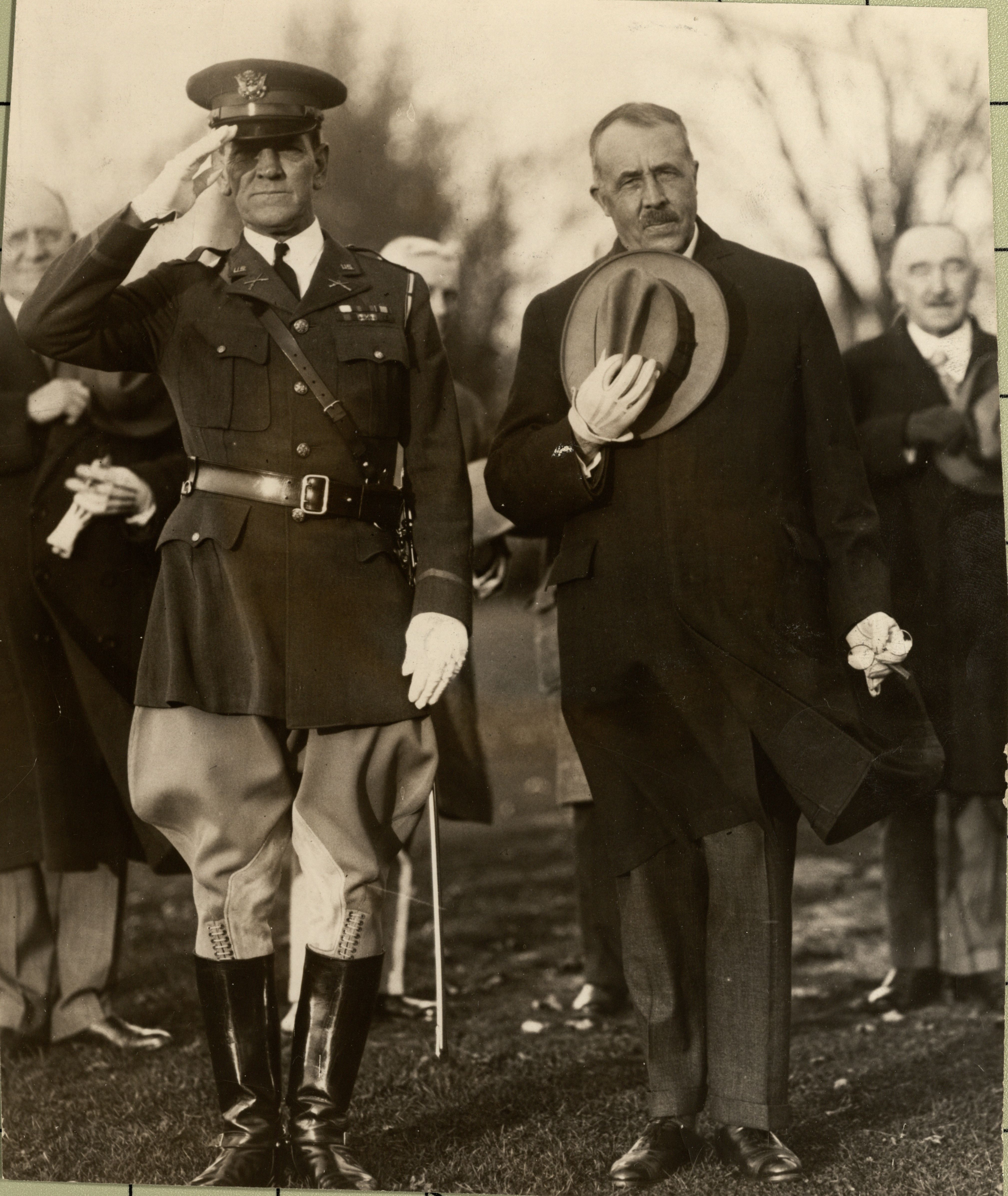
Sweeney (left) with Arthur R. Rogers in 1928

In the years following World War I, Sweeney served as a staff officer and spent several years at the U.S. Army War College, then located in the Washington Barracks (today known as Fort Lesley J. McNair). The 1920 United States census shows Sweeney living at Washington Barracks. Besides taking courses as a War College student, from 1924 through 1928 Sweeney was the director of the War College's supply and personnel courses.

In 1924, Sweeney's book Military Intelligence: A New Weapon in War was published by the Frederick A. Stokes Company of New York. Looking back to the recently ended World War, Sweeney criticizes German military intelligence for failing to anticipate the willingness and ability of the United States to mobilize. He praises both U.S. military censorship and the Stars and Stripes newspaper for their contributions to the victory over the Central Powers. As Sweeney himself had key roles in both military censorship and the creation of the Stars and Stripes, his objectivity regarding their overall military value may be fairly questioned. That aside, Sweeney acknowledges that the military intelligence capabilities and techniques employed during World War I, though much improved compared to previous wars, will not be adequate for future wars. A New York Times review of Military Intelligence: A New Weapon in War describes it as an "intelligible and compact little book ... indispensable to the soldier, whether he is serving with the regular army, training in the National Guard, or a member of the organized reserve."

The "Publisher's Note" that appears in the front matter of Military Intelligence: A New Weapon in War includes this biographical sketch of Sweeney:

There are few men in America with broader experience in Military Intelligence than Lieutenant Colonel Walter C. Sweeney.

Entering the regular army in 1899 from civil life as a second lieutenant of infantry, he served, all over the world, through the several grades to his present rank. He is a distinguished graduate of the Army School of the Line (1912), a graduate of the Army Staff College (1913) and a graduate of the Army War College (1920). He saw active service in the Philippines in 1900 and 1901 and in later years in the Moro campaigns; served on the Mexican Border during the troublous years of 1915 and 1916; and was instructor in the First Officers' Training Camp at Presidio, California, when America entered the World War.

By July, 1917, Colonel Sweeney—then Major—was in France with the A.E.F. Detailed to the General Staff, he was assigned to the Military Intelligence Division at General Pershing's Headquarters and was the Executive Officer of that Division during its organization period. From August, 1917, to July, 1918, he was Chief of the Censorship Section of the Military Intelligence Division —at the time when it was so vitally necessary to see that no information of value leaked through to the enemy. This censorship covered the press, letters, photography, telephones, the telegraph, wireless and other methods of communication; publicity and propaganda; visitors, etc.

"The Stars and Stripes," read by two million dough- boys, was originated and first published under the direct supervision of Colonel Sweeney, as Chief of the Censorship Section, Military Intelligence Division.

At his urgent request for duty with the fighting troops, Colonel Sweeney was relieved from duty at General Head- quarters and after attending and graduating from the General Staff School at Langres, France, was attached to Headquarters, 5th Army Corps, during the St. Mihiel Offensive. In September, 1918, he was appointed Chief of Staff, 28th Division, and served in that capacity in the Meuse-Argonne Offensive and in subsequent operations up to the time of the Armistice. He remained on duty with the 28th Division until early in 1919, when he was again detailed for duty with the General Staff at G.H.Q., A.E.F. Since January, 1921, he has been on duty at 1st Corps Area Headquarters, Boston, as Intelligence Officer for the six New England States.

He was awarded the Distinguished Service Medal by the United States Government for service during the World War; the Legion of Honor, Officers' Grade, by the French Government; and received a citation from the Commander-in-Chief, A.E.F., for services in action September 28, 1918, near Apremont, France.

Colonel Sweeney's long and varied experiences make him thoroughly conversant with every phase of the Military Intelligence Division: with its formative struggles, with its objectives, and with its achievements; and his book on Military Intelligence is written by a man who knows his subject, who is a recognized authority in this new and important field.

Promoted to brigadier general in December 1935, Sweeney took command of the Sixth Infantry Brigade at Fort Douglas, Utah. Following his promotion to major general in June 1938, Sweeney took command of the Third Infantry Division at Fort Lewis, Washington. In taking command of the Third Infantry Division, Sweeney was one of five generals chosen to lead divisions then being modernized by conversion from traditional four-regiment square divisions into more flexible, and therefore more suitable for modern warfare, triangular divisions consisting of three regiments each. Under Sweeney's command, the newly reorganized Third Infantry Division participated in important war games, including a mock invasion of California involving land, sea, and air forces.

Among the future generals included in Sweeney's Third Infantry Division command were Mark W. Clark and Dwight David Eisenhower. In Eisenhower: A Soldier's Life, 1890–1945, military historian Carlo d'Este relates a story of then-Lt. Colonel Eisenhower being offered a coveted invitation to one of Sweeney's regular poker games. Although Sweeney was a keen card player, newcomer Eisenhower won so much money from Sweeney and the other poker-game regulars that he was not known to have been invited back.

Sweeney retired from active duty due to age on November 30, 1940. However, in June 1942 he was called out of retirement to head the California State Guard. He retired from this post in 1943.

Sweeney died on April 9, 1963, at Letterman Army Hospital, San Francisco, California and is buried in San Francisco National Cemetery.

== Family ==
The 1880 United States census shows that Walter Sweeney, then 3, shared his family home with his parents and seven siblings: Rose M. Sweeney, 22; Andrew T. Sweeney, 20; Mary Sweeney, 16; Sallie Sweeney, 15; Willie Sweeney, 11; Frank Sweeney, 5; and Edgar Sweeney, 2.

Walter C. Sweeney married Anne Eloise McConnell of Tennessee on April 10, 1904. They remained married until her death on December 15, 1953, in San Francisco, California. The couple had three children:

- Elizabeth Josephine Sweeney Gayle,
- Walter Campbell Sweeney Jr., a U.S. Air Force general who served as commander of the Tactical Air Command.
- Anne Eloise Sweeney, a U.S. Army officer who achieved the rank of Lt. Colonel and served as deputy director of the Women's Army Corps.

== Dates of rank ==
Source: Official Army Register. Washington, D.C.: Government Printing Office, 1943. Page 1310.

- Private & Corporal, 1st West Virginia Volunteers, May 7, 1898, to January 4, 1899
- 2nd Lieutenant, 1st West Virginia Volunteers, January 5, 1899
- 2nd Lieutenant, United States Army, June 21, 1899
- 1st Lieutenant, United States Army, February 2, 1901
- Captain, United States Army, June 28, 1909
- Major, United States Army, July 25, 1917
- Lt. Colonel, National Army, August 20, 1917
- Colonel, National Army, October 24, 1918
- (Reverted to rank of major following the end of World War I.)
- Lt. Colonel, United States Army, July 1, 1920
- Colonel, United States Army, March 21, 1926
- Brigadier General, United States Army, December 24, 1935
- Major General, United States Army, June 1, 1938
- Retired, United States Army, November 30, 1940
