= Bill Sweeney (footballer) =

Australian rules footballer, born 1914

Personal information
- Full name: Bill Sweeney
- Born: 2 June 1914
- Died: 13 July 1973 (aged 59)
- Original team: Assumption College

Playing career^{1}
Years	Club	Games (Goals)
1934–35	Melbourne	4 (3)
- ^{1} Playing statistics correct to the end of 1935.

Bill Sweeney (2 June 1914 – 13 July 1973) was an Australian rules footballer who played with Melbourne in the Victorian Football League (VFL).
