= Bo Sweeney =

Assistant Secretary of the Interior from 1914 to 1917

Sanford Beauregard Sweeney
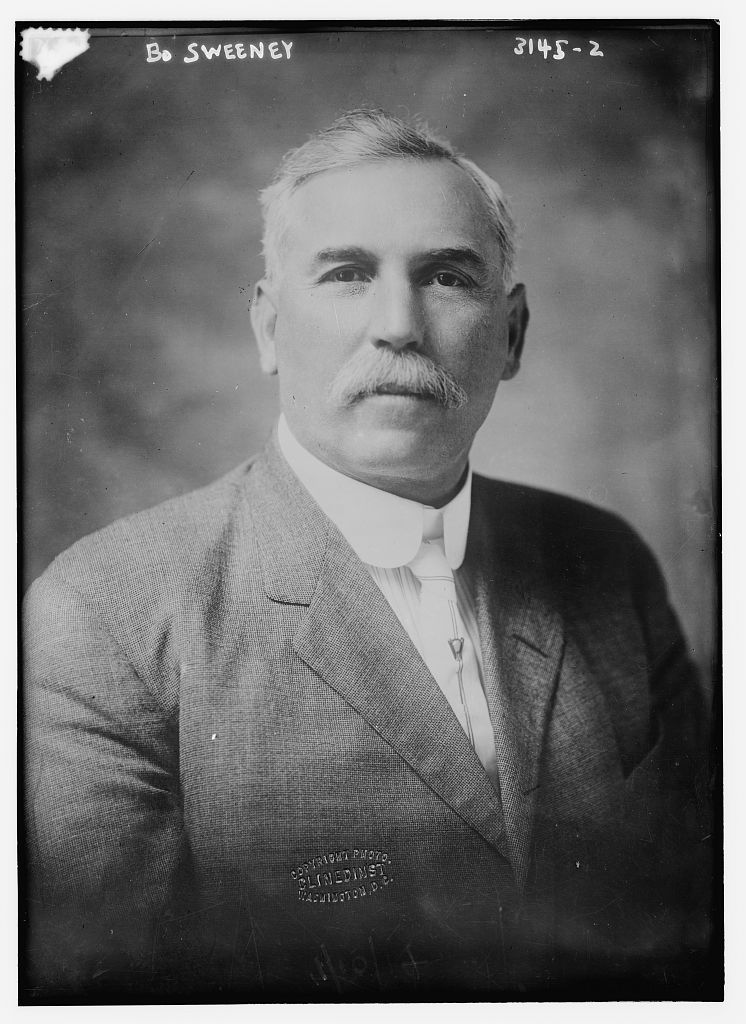
- Born: September 20, 1862; Missouri
- Died: July 16, 1917 (aged 54); Washington, D.C.
- Other name: Bo Sweeney
- Title: Assistant Secretary of the Interior

Sanford Beauregard Sweeney (September 20, 1862 - July 16, 1917) was an assistant Secretary of the Interior from 1914 to 1917.

== Biography ==
He was born in Missouri on September 20, 1862, to Joshua Sweeney and Martha Weldon Haley. On July 1, 1897, he married Lillina Reeves. He died on July 16, 1917, in Washington, D.C., from heart problems.
