= Mary Ann Sweeney =

American plasma physicist

Mary Ann Sweeney (born 1945) is an American physicist at Sandia National Laboratories. Although her doctoral research concerned astronomy, her work at Sandia has largely concerned inertial confinement fusion and pulsed power.

== Education and career ==
Sweeney is originally from Mercersburg, Pennsylvania; her parents moved to Baltimore when she was a teenager to improve their children's educational prospects. She majored in physics at Mount Holyoke College, graduating in 1967 with a bachelor's thesis concerning white dwarf stars. She went to Columbia University for doctoral study but, unable to find a faculty member at Columbia who would take a female student for the topics that interested her, finished her doctorate at Columbia with an outside advisor from Princeton University.

She met her husband Ed, who was also an astronomy graduate student at the time and later went to law school at the University of New Mexico. She followed her husband to Albuquerque, where he had been assigned for his service in the United States Air Force. Seeking a science job nearby, Sweeney applied to work at Sandia National Laboratories, in "anything but secretarial work", and started her career in pulsed power physics there in 1974.

Sweeney chaired the IEEE Plasma Science and Applications Committee from 1989 to 1990, as its first female chair. She also chaired the Committee on Women in Plasma Physics of the American Physical Society from 2010 to 2012.

Sweeney spent 2 years at the National Nuclear Security Administration and later became editor-in-chief of the annual NNSA/DOE Stockpile Stewardship and Management Plan for 6 years. In 2023, she became the point of contact to NNSA.

== Contributions and recognition ==
In 1992, Sweeney was named a Fellow of the IEEE "for contributions to the understanding of plasma opening switches and beam interactions with matter in particle beam accelerators". In 2007, Mount Holyoke College gave her their Alumnae Achievement Award.

Sweeney won the 2013 National Nuclear Security Administration (NNSA) Defense Programs Award of Excellence for her work as editor-in-chief of the NNSA Stockpile Stewardship and Management Plan. That same year she was recruited by Asay and Chhabildas to assist in writing and editing their upcoming book. She became one of four coauthors of the book Impactful Times: Memories of 60 Years of Shock Wave Research at Sandia National Laboratories (2017).

== Selected publications ==
- Lucy, L. B.; Sweeney, M. A. (August 1971), "Spectroscopic binaries with circular orbits", Astronomical Journal, 76: 544–556, Bibcode:1971AJ.....76..544L, doi:10.1086/111159
- Sweeney, M. A. (June 1976), "Cooling times, luminosity functions and progenitor masses of degenerate dwarfs", Astronomy and Astrophysics, 49: 375–385, Bibcode:1976A&A....49..375S
- Sweeney, M. A.; Farnsworth, A. V. (January 1981), "High-gain, low-intensity ICF targets for a charged-particle beam fusion driver", Nuclear Fusion, 21 (1): 41–54, Bibcode:1981NucFu..21...41S, doi:10.1088/0029-5515/21/1/004
- Johnson, D. J.; Quintenz, J. P.; Sweeney, M. A. (February 1985), "Electron and ion kinetics and anode plasma formation in two applied B_{r} field ion diodes", Journal of Applied Physics, 57 (3): 794–805, Bibcode:1985JAP....57..794J, doi:10.1063/1.334728
- Matzen, M. Keith; Sweeney, M. A.; Adams, R. G.; Asay, J. R.; Bailey, J. E.; Bennett, G. R.; Bliss, D. E.; Bloomquist, D. D.; Brunner, T. A.; Campbell, R. B.; Chandler, G. A.; Coverdale, C. A.; Cuneo, M. E.; Davis, J.-P.; Deeney, C.; Desjarlais, M. P.; Donovan, G. L.; Garasi, C. J.; Haill, T. A.; Hall, C. A.; Hanson, D. L.; Hurst, M. J.; Jones, B.; Knudson, M. D.; Leeper, R. J.; Lemke, R. W.; Mazarakis, M. G.; McDaniel, D. H.; Mehlhorn, T. A.; Nash, T. J.; Olson, C. L.; Porter, J. L.; Rambo, P. K.; Rosenthal, S. E.; Rochau, G. A.; Ruggles, L. E.; Ruiz, C. L.; Sanford, T. W. L.; Seamen, J. F.; Sinars, D. B.; Slutz, S. A.; Smith, I. C.; Struve, K. W.; Stygar, W. A.; Vesey, R. A.; Weinbrecht, E. A.; Wenger, D. F.; Yu, E. P. (May 2005), "Pulsed-power-driven high energy density physics and inertial confinement fusion research", Physics of Plasmas, 12 (5): 055503, Bibcode:2005PhPl...12e5503M, doi:10.1063/1.1891746
- Asay, James R.; Chhabildas, Lalit C.; Lawrence, R. Jeffery; Sweeney, Mary Ann (2017), Impactful Times: Memories of 60 Years of Shock Wave Research at Sandia National Laboratories, Shock Wave and High Pressure Phenomena, Springer International Publishing, doi:10.1007/978-3-319-33347-2, ISBN 978-3-319-33345-8
