= William J. Sweeney (Wisconsin politician) =

American politician

William J. Sweeney was a member of the Wisconsin State Assembly.

== Biography ==
Sweeney was born in Glenmore, Wisconsin. He later resided in De Pere, Wisconsin.

== Career ==
Sweeney was a member of the Assembly from 1933 to 1946 and was a Democrat. Previously, he had served as Town Clerk of Glenmore from 1922 to 1927 and Town Chairman of Glenmore from 1927 to 1929.
