= Jeffrey L. Kessler =

American lawyer (born 1954)

Jeffrey Kessler
- Born: 1954 (age 71–72); New York City, New York, U.S.
- Education: Columbia University (BA, JD)
- Children: 2

Jeffrey L. Kessler is an American attorney and partner and co-executive chairman of Winston & Strawn. He is one of the country's leading sports lawyers.

He began his career at Weil, Gotshal & Manges and previously was the global litigation chair at the international law firm Dewey & LeBoeuf.

== Early life and education ==
Kessler was born in Brooklyn, New York, in 1954 to Edith and Milton Kessler. He grew up in Sea Gate, Brooklyn, with his parents and his older sister Linda. He attended Columbia University and graduated summa cum laude in 1975. In 1977, he graduated from Columbia Law School as a James Kent Scholar and editor of the Law Review. In 2016, the college awarded him a John Jay Award for distinguished professional achievement.

== Career ==
=== Weil, Gotshal & Manges ===
Kessler began his career at Weil, Gotshal & Manges as an associate in the Antitrust Department full-time in 1977, after working there as a summer associate. He became a partner in 1984. He represented a number of U.S. and international companies in criminal and civil investigations in the antitrust and trade areas and was part of the team that successfully defended Matsushita Electric and JVC against claims of a worldwide conspiracy in the U.S. Supreme Court case Zenith v. Matsushita. In 2000, Kessler won a complete jury acquittal of his client Panasonic in Jefferson Parish, Louisiana, in a case claiming over $1 billion in damages for an alleged fraud. He became regarded as a leading commentator on international antitrust law. He also was the lead counsel in several IP cases involving frontier issues of IP law.

He litigated a number of landmark sports-antitrust cases while at Weil, including McNeil v. The NFL, which led to the establishment of free agency in the National Football League (NFL). Other clients in sports law cases during his time at Weil Gotshal included NFLPA; the NBPA; the Arena Football League Players Association (AFLPA); the National Hockey League Players' Association, the MLBPA; the NFL Coaches Association; Players, Inc.; the Women's Tennis Benefit Association; and Adidas. Kessler also represented various classes of NBA, NFL, AFL, and MLS players, and several professional leagues, including the North American Soccer League and United States Football League, and the cities of San Diego and Oakland and Alameda County. He represented Latrell Sprewell in his controversial suspension arbitration.

=== Dewey & LeBoeuf ===
In 2003, Kessler joined Dewey Ballantine. Dewey Ballantine later merged with the law firm LeBoeuf, Lamb, Greene & MacRae and Kessler became a senior partner at the newly formed Dewey & LeBoeuf, where he became chairman of the firm's global litigation department, co-chairman of the sports litigation practice group, and a member of its executive and leadership committees.

Kessler continued to represent the NFLPA and the NBPA in major sports disputes, and also represented the National Invitation Tournament, CAA Sports, Wasserman Media Group, SCP Worldwide, and did pro bono work for South African Amputee Oscar Pistorius and Castor Semanaya. Both runners were successfully represented by Kessler and allowed to compete in the Olympics despite challenges from the International Association of Athletics Federations (IAFF). Kessler continued to negotiate the free agency/salary cap systems in the NFL and NBA on behalf of his player union clients, and he represented Michael Vick in his roster bonus arbitration and Plaxico Burress in his signing bonus arbitration.

He published a new edition of International Trade and U.S. Antitrust Law, a treatise on antitrust and trade law issues in a global economy, and was co-editor-in-chief of State Antitrust Practice and Statutes.

Kessler lectured at Columbia Law School, where he taught a course on complex litigation. He has written and lectured on a wide variety of antitrust, sports law, and related topics. He also co-chaired the publications committee and chaired the international antitrust law committee of the Antitrust Section of the American Bar Association (ABA). He was also a member of the ABA's NAFTA Tri-National Committee and an adjunct professor of law at Fordham Law School. He was a founding member of the board of advisors of the Georgetown University Study of Private Antitrust Litigation.

=== Winston & Strawn ===
In May 2012, Kessler joined Winston & Strawn. In October 2012, Kessler was elected co-executive chairman.

Since joining Winston, Kessler led the team that secured victory on behalf of classes of Division I college football and basketball athletes in their antitrust challenge to the compensation restrictions maintained by the National Collegiate Athletic Association (NCAA). On March 31, 2021, SCOTUS issued a unanimous decision in National Collegiate Athletic Association v. Alston affirming the team's trial win. The win came in March 2019, when Judge Wilken found that the NCAA was in violation of the antitrust laws by limiting the amount of compensation that college basketball and football players could receive, and issued a trial ruling in favor of the plaintiff athlete classes.

Following the Alston win, a Kessler-led team joined the follow-on House litigation as co-lead plaintiff's counsel. The student athlete plaintiffs in House v. NCAA alleged that NCAA's rules limiting student athletes from profiting from their name, image, and/or likeness (NIL) violated antitrust law. Most recently, a team led by Kessler at Winston, along with Hagens Berman, filed another Alston successor litigation, Hubbard, which seeks triple damages for college athletes injured by NCAA restrictions on education-related compensation for collegiate athletes held to be unlawful in Alston.

Kessler served as lead class counsel for U.S. Women's National Team players in their action against the U.S. Soccer Federation (USSF) in their pay discrimination claim. The case, Morgan vs. USSF, received intense global media attention. The players successfully resolved their claims for equal working conditions on April 12, 2021, and on August 15, 2022, the court approved the landmark equal-pay settlement Winston and the lead plaintiffs negotiated on behalf of current and former USWNT soccer players. The USSF agreed both to pay an equal rate of pay going forward in all games, including the World Cup, and to compensate the players with $24M to redress the past discrimination.

Adding to his antitrust wins on behalf of labor in the sports and entertainment industries a team led by Kessler defended Actors’ Equity Association (“Equity”)—a union representing actors in Broadway theaters—in Drabinsky v. Actor’s Equity, filed by a producer who was placed on Equity's “Do Not Work List” and alleged that his placement on the list constituted a group boycott in violation of Sherman Act. In April 2023, the team secured dismissal with prejudice of the antitrust claims against Equity on the grounds that its conduct was protected from the Sherman Act by the Statutory Labor Exemption. This ruling confirms the broad protections unions enjoy when they act in their self-interest and not in combination with non-labor groups. This win was recognized by The American Lawyer with a “Litigator of the Week” Shout Out nod.

In March 2023, Kessler won a major Second Circuit victory for Relevant Sports, LLC, a sports promoter that organizes soccer matches in the United States involving professional teams from non-U.S. leagues. The unanimous decision revived Relevant's antitrust litigation challenging a FIFA rule prohibiting official season professional soccer league games from being played outside a team's or league's FIFA-designated country, and earned Jeffrey and his team a “Litigator of the Week” Runner-Up spot from The American Lawyer."

He represented New England Patriots quarterback Tom Brady in successfully contesting at district court a four-game suspension, imposed by NFL Commissioner Roger Goodell in connection with the “Deflategate” controversy. Kessler led the team for the NFLPA, scoring a historic victory for the NFLPA and NFL players Scott Fujita, Anthony Hargrove, Will Smith and Jonathan Vilma in the so-called “Bountygate” controversy. The victory allowed the players to rejoin their teams after an arbitration vacated the suspensions issued by Roger Goodell for allegedly participating in a program which rewarded players for knocking out their opponents.

Kessler’s representation of players’ unions continued through the NFLPA’s and the NBPA’s most recent collective bargaining negotiations, as well as through the COVID-19 pandemic, during which he represented the unions in negotiating their return-to-work agreements. He also represented the MLBPA in defeating a preliminary injunction sought against the 2021 All-Star Game.

Kessler represented 23XI Racing and Front Row Motorsports as lead counsel in their former antitrust lawsuit against NASCAR since the lawsuit was filed on October 2, 2024 and ended on December 11, 2025, with a settlement.

In 2026, Kessler led the case against Live Nation and Ticketmaster. He joined the case after the DOJ reached a settlement and withdrew one week before trial. The remaining 33 states went to trial, and the jury found Live Nation and its subsidiary, Ticketmaster, liable for operating an illegal monopoly.

== Personal life ==
Kessler has been married to his wife Regina since 1977 and has lived in New York his entire life. He has two children and four grandchildren.
