= Winston & Strawn =

American law firm

Winston & Strawn LLP
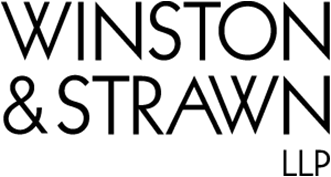
- Headquarters: Leo Burnett Building; Chicago, Illinois; United States
- No. of offices: 15 (2025)
- No. of attorneys: 975 (2025)
- No. of employees: approximately 2,000 total
- Key people: Steve D'Amore(Chairman); Jeffrey L. Kessler (Co-Executive Chairman); Dan K. Webb (Co-Executive Chairman)
- Date founded: 1853
- Founder: Frederick H. Winston
- Company type: Limited liability partnership
- Website: www.winston.com

Winston & Strawn LLP is an American multinational law firm headquartered in Chicago, Illinois. Founded in 1853, it is one of the largest and oldest law firms in Chicago. The firm has offices across the United States, Europe, Asia, and South America. The firm is known for its litigation and transactional practices across a variety of fields. In 2026, the firm approved a transatlantic merger with Taylor Wessing's UK-led business to form Winston Taylor.

== History ==
Winston & Strawn LLP was founded in Chicago in 1853 by Frederick H. Winston, who was joined by the firm's other name partner, Silas H. Strawn, in 1892.

The white-shoe firm has made a series of mergers and opened additional offices. The firm operates in the Cravath System tradition, with practices such as lateral hiring.

In 2000, the firm merged with the New York office of Whitman Breed Abbott & Morgan. This added about 80 attorneys in corporate law, capital markets, project finance, and venture capital, bringing its total of New York lawyers to 250.

In May, 2012, 60 attorneys joined the firm from Dewey & LeBoeuf.

In 2016 Winston & Strawn became the first Chicago law firm to match the record starting salary of $180,000 for first-year associates, beginning a "salary war" among large Chicago law firms after years of no change.

In 2016, the firm announced a gender-neutral parental leave policy, allowing both male and female associates to take up to 20 weeks of paid parental leave within the first year of a child's life.

In February 2017, the firm opened an office in Dallas with twenty-three partners from eight different law firms in Texas., In July of that year it added twelve partners to its employee benefits and executive compensation team, all from McDermott Will & Emery LLP.

In January, 2020, the firm closed its office in Dubai, which the firm had opened four years earlier.

In August 2020, the firm announced the formation of an Environmental, Social and Governance (ESG) Advisory Team, designed to assist companies navigate their ESG Profiles.

From mid-2020, the firm introduced austerity measures, including cuts to associate numbers and partner compensation, due to the COVID-19 pandemic.

In September 2025, Winston & Strawn’s Patent Litigation Practice was recognized among the top 25 law firms in Patexia’s 2025 PTAB Intelligence Report, which analyzes five years of patent litigation activity. Several attorneys were individually ranked among the top 50, 100, and 250 practitioners in the country.

In December 2025, it was reported that the company was in discussions about a merger with UK-based law firm Taylor Wessing. In 2026, the transatlantic merger was approved, to create Winston Taylor. The firms are scheduled to merge in May 2026, with Taylor Wessing's UK, Netherlands and Belgium operations to then exit its current Swiss verein structure.

== Offices ==
The firm's largest office by number of employees is Chicago. It maintains other U.S. offices in Charlotte, Dallas, Houston, Los Angeles, Miami, New York, San Francisco, Silicon Valley, and Washington, D.C., international offices in Europe (Brussels, London, and Paris), South America São Paulo, and Asia (Shanghai).

== Revenue ==
In 2017, the firm's reported revenue was $985 million in 2017.

Its reported 2019 revenue was $1.01 billion.

In 2020, during the COVID-19 pandemic, revenue decreased about three percent, to $981.2 million, while partner profits increased by more than four percent due to reduced expenses.

== Notable representations ==
Winston & Strawn has handled high-profile matters for its clients, including its organizing the Union Stockyard and Transit Company in 1894; challenging the War Powers Act in 1944 on behalf of department store Montgomery Ward; and representing the Atlanta Braves baseball franchise in 1966 litigation involving its relocation from Milwaukee to Atlanta. More recently:

- 2025: Led by Jeffrey Kessler, a favorable settlement was achieved for 23XI Racing and Front Row Motorsports in their antitrust lawsuit against NASCAR.
- 2017: Achieved a favorable settlement for client Beef Products, Inc., BPI Technology, Inc., and Freezing Machines, Inc. (BPI) in a lawsuit against ABC News that has been described as "one of the most high-stakes defamation court battles in U.S. history."
- 2016: On behalf of Warner Chilcott (owned by Teva Pharmaceuticals), secured a judgment invalidating the patent for NuvaRing—the first combined contraceptive vaginal ring marketed in the U.S. The judgment struck down Merck & Co's patent infringement claims.
- 2016: Represented Verizon as Employment & Employee Benefits Counsel in Acquisition of Yahoo!
- 2016: Led by Dan Webb, released report regarding review of the Federal Civil Rights Litigation Division of the City of Chicago Department of Law
- 2015: Obtained a win before the U.S. Supreme Court on behalf of Omnicare Inc.
- In an antitrust lawsuit led by Jeffrey Kessler, representing a group of current and former college athletes seeking to strike down unlawful compensation restraints imposed by the NCAA on Division I men's basketball and football programs
- Represented Luxottica Group S.p.A. in acquisitions, including its $1.6 billion hostile takeover of U.S. Shoe Corporation, owner of LensCrafters, in 1995 and its 2007 $2 billion acquisition of Oakley
- 2007: Assisted Lear Corporation in connection with the bid for the company by Carl Icahn.
- 2006: Represented the New York Stock Exchange in the Grasso compensation investigation and subsequent litigation
- 2002: Achieved a victory for Microsoft Corporation in the remedy phase of its battle against federal and state antitrust claims
- 2001: Counseled Barr Laboratories to invalidate a key patent on Prozac in a case Fortune magazine calls "the mother of all patent challenges"
- 1994: Defended General Electric in its industrial-diamond price-fixing case, led by Dan K. Webb

== Notable current and former employees ==
- Beryl Anthony Jr.: Congressman from Arkansas, former chairman of the Democratic Congressional Campaign Committee
- Tim Broas: former United States Ambassador to the Netherlands
- James H. Douglas Jr.: former United States Deputy Secretary of Defense
- Bruce Downey: former CEO of Barr Pharmaceuticals
- James R. Thompson: Former governor of Illinois
- Nathan Sawaya: artist
- Emily Giffin: author of Something Borrowed
- Thomas Kirsch: United States attorney for the United States District Court for the Northern District of Indiana
- Michael K. Atkinson: Inspector General of the Intelligence Community under the Office of the Director of National Intelligence
- Eric Hargan: Deputy Secretary at the U.S. Department of Health and Human Services
- Jeffrey Kessler: Winston & Strawn co-executive chairman and antitrust, sports law, and trial lawyer. Represented Tom Brady in Brady v. NFL, which led to the end of the 2011 NFL lockout.
- Dan Webb: Winston & Strawn co-executive chairman and U.S. trial lawyer who achieved successful prosecution of retired Admiral John Poindexter in the Iran-Contra affair. Previously the U.S. Attorney for the Northern District of Illinois. In 2017, he was named a Lifetime Achiever by The American Lawyer.
- Abbe Lowell: His practice focuses on litigation, complex investigations and regulatory enforcement.
- Earl Jinkinson: noted antitrust lawyer
- Thomas M. Melsheimer: managing partner of the firm's Dallas office
- Daniel Ninivaggi: former partner and of counsel, served as CEO of Icahn Enterprises from 2010 to 2014 and Federal-Mogul from 2014 to 2017.
- Matthew D. Orwig: former U.S. Attorney for the Eastern District of Texas, founder of the firm's Dallas office
- Jack O'Malley: former Cook County State's Attorney, heading the second-largest prosecutor's office in the United States
- Julissa Reynoso Pantaleón: partner and former United States Ambassador to Spain former chief of staff to First Lady Jill Biden, former United States ambassador to Uruguay
- Franklin R. Parker: former Assistant Secretary of the Navy (Manpower and Reserve Affairs)
- John Barton Payne: American politician, lawyer and judge, United States Secretary of the Interior from 1920 until 1921 under Woodrow Wilson's administration
- Rob Pelinka: basketball player, general manager of the Los Angeles Lakers
- Gail Standish: Magistrate Judge of the United States District Court for the Central District of California
- Kathi Vidal: partner and former Under Secretary of Commerce for IP and Director of the U.S. Patent and Trademark Office (USPTO)
- Matthew M. Graves: former United States Attorney for the District of Columbia

== See also ==
- List of largest United States-based law firms by profits per partner
