= Associate attorney =

Lawyer without ownership interest in a law firm

An associate attorney is a lawyer and an employee of a law firm who does not hold an ownership interest as a partner.

== Types ==
=== Practicing attorney ===
An associate may be a junior or senior attorney, but normally does not hold an ownership interest in the firm even if associated with the firm for many years. First-year associates are entry-level junior attorneys and are generally recent law school graduates in their first year of law practice.

Generally, an associate has the goal of being made a partner in the firm, after a number of years gaining practice experience and being assigned to increasingly important and remunerative tasks. At firms with an "up or out" policy, associates who are repeatedly passed over for promotion to partner may be asked to resign. Some firms will also have "non-partner-track" associates who, though performing satisfactorily as employees, for whatever reason, will not be promoted to partner.

Junior attorneys were formerly called "law clerks"; the term "associate attorney" was coined by Emory Buckner, hiring partner of Root, Clark & Bird (which subsequently became Dewey Ballantine) in the 1920s. The term "law clerk" now generally refers to an attorney who serves as a research and writing assistant in a judge's chambers, although some law firms use the term to refer to a lawyer or non-lawyer who has specialized knowledge in one of the firm's practice areas but is not classified as a practicing attorney at the law firm.

=== Summer associates ===
Summer associates are current law students who have usually completed their second year of school (or in some cases, their first year of law school) and are interning at the firm for the summer. Summer associates have not passed the bar exam and are not attorneys. The summer associate program is often the primary method by which a law firm recruits for full-time associate positions.

== Compensation ==
According to published data from the New York Times, the annual base salary for partner-track first year associate attorneys at top law firms in major U.S. legal markets such as New York, California, Massachusetts, the District of Columbia, and Texas can range from $160,000 to $190,000 per year—with salary varying depending on the size and reputation of the firm.
