= Obaidullah (detainee) =

Afghan Guantanamo detainee

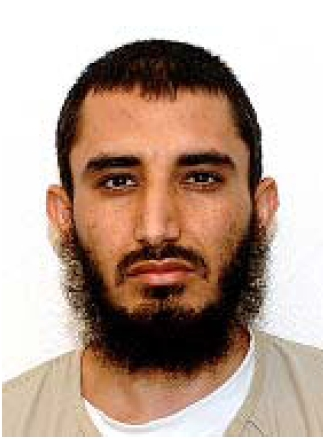
- Obaidullah's Guantanamo identity portrait, showing him wearing the white uniform issued to compliant individuals
- Born: 1980 (age 45–46); Khost, Afghanistan
- Arrested: July 20, 2002; Miland Village, Ismail Khiel District, Khowst Province, Afghanistan
- Released: December 23, 2019; Afghanistan
- Citizenship: Afghanistan
- Detained at: Guantanamo
- Other names: Obaydullah, Baidullah Bertola Obaidullah
- ISN: 762
- Charge(s): Charged on September 9, 2008; All charges dismissed on June 7, 2011
- Status: Released
- Occupation: shop-owner

Obaidullah (born 1980) is a citizen of Afghanistan who was one of the last remaining Afghan detainees held in extrajudicial detention in the United States Guantanamo Bay detention camp, in Cuba. He was captured as an Enemy combatant on July 20, 2002, transferred to Guantanamo on October 28, 2002, and transferred to the United Arab Emirates on August 15, 2016. Obaidullah was released and repatriated to Afghanistan on 23 December 2019.

Obaidullah's Guantanamo Internment Serial Number is 762. American intelligence analysts estimate that Obaidullah was born in 1980 in Khost, Afghanistan.

== Capture and detention ==
On July 20, 2002, two dozen American Special Armed Forces soldiers, acting on an anonymous tip, raided Obaidullah's family home and took him into custody along with his cousins. At the time, Obaidullah was carrying a notebook which the U.S. alleges contained diagrams for improvised explosive devices.

In a statement made during his habeas corpus proceedings, Obaidullah stated:

The Americans came while my family and I were all sleeping in our home in the village of Milani, close to Khost City. At that time I was approximately 19 years old. On that night, I heard noises and the soldiers woke me up. I was very confused about what was going on, and why they were in my home, but I and my family cooperated with them. Even though I was not resisting, they tied my feet together and my hands together with plastic cuffs. Then they put a hood over my head and forced me to sit for hours against a wall. The plastic cut into my hands and it was painful to sit that way for so long. I was terrified about what would happen to me.

=== Chapman Airfield ===
From his home, Obaidullah was transported to Chapman Airfield, a forward operating base. Obaidullah described his treatment at Chapman airbase in a statement made during his habeas corpus proceedings:

After I got to the military base, there were several soldiers who told me to put my hands up and then to hold them straight out to the front of me. I did what they told me to do. They then put two sandbags on my arms and made me walk around back and forth with them like that all night. They were extremely heavy, and if I dropped the bags, the soldiers put them back on my arms. They got so heavy that I had to kind of place them on my stomach as I moved. They did not let me sleep at all for the rest of that night but forced me to keep moving with bags on my arms. When they moved me from one location to another, the soldiers were extremely rough and shoved me around with their knees and elbows in a very painful and frightening way. In the morning before sunrise, I was taken into a room and interrogated by three or four soldiers. They told me that they would kill me if I didn't talk. After I told them I didn't know the answers to their questions, one of them knocked me to the floor. He took out a long knife and started sharpening it in front of me. I could hear the sounds of the knife being sharpened. He then lifted my hood and showed me the knife. He put it on the back of my head and said now start talking… I was terrified and fully believed that they might kill me.

=== Bagram ===
Obaidullah reported abusive interrogation while held in Bagram, during a period when the officers in charge have acknowledged directing the use of the proscribed technique of chaining a detainee's hands above his head in order to impose sleep deprivation.

Obaidullah alleges that after arriving at Bagram, he was kept in a small isolation cell, with his hands chained above his head to the ceiling:

The soldiers chained my hands above my head to the ceiling and would leave me like that for 45 minutes or an hour, then take me into an interrogation room, then take me back after the interrogation and chain my arms up again for another 45 minutes to two hours.

He described his interrogations:

During these interrogations, they questioned me at times under very hot lights, while making me kneel and put my hands on my head for hours. Sometimes I was forced to stand on my knees. I was also forced to stand at times in a bent position while they questioned me. These positions were very painful… Usually my hood was on when they questioned me, but not always. The hood had a rope at the neck. They pulled this rope so tight that it choked me. Many times they tied my hands and then hooked them to the wall or ceiling over my head while they were questioning me. They also slapped me and spit in my mouth. They held me by the neck, shook me and screamed at me."

A Naval Criminal Investigative Service officer who investigated Obaidullah's case wrote in a sworn statement:

Based on my interviews of Afghan witnesses with personal knowledge and my other investigative efforts, detainees at Bagram during this period in 2002, including Obaidullah, were subjected to extraordinarily coercive measures which cause me to question the reliability of resulting statements."

=== Guantanamo ===
Obaidullah was transferred to Guantanamo on October 28, 2002.

Regarding his interrogations there, Obaidullah stated:

When I was taken to an interrogation, they often put me in a freezing cold room with the air conditioning way up high. After the interrogation was over, they would leave me in there for another 3-4 hours by myself with the air conditioning up high. For a long time, maybe a year, after I got to Guantánamo, the interrogators controlled everything about our lives. If we wanted water or if we wanted to see a doctor, it all depended on whether the interrogators approved it or not. One time, about 2 or 3 months after I arrived in Guantánamo, I was very sick for many days. My throat was sore and I had a fever. Finally, they took me to the infirmary. A doctor began to examine me. After a short time, an interrogator came to the door and signalled to the doctor. The doctor went outside and talked to the interrogator for a short time and then left. He did not return. I was taken back to my cell even though I was still sick and felt very bad.

==== Hunger Strike ====
In February 2013, more than a decade after his arrival at Guantanamo, Obaidullah began a hunger strike. According to Obaidullah, he joined a hunger strike spurred by "invasive" cell searches conducted in February 2013. The removal of items including his family photos and mail from his attorneys, he said, was "especially distressing for me because I have nothing to provoke the authorities to take my belongings and comfort items that gave me a small sense of humanity."

He stated:

I had not participated in hunger strikes, or organized protests in the past. I have been patiently challenging my imprisonment in US civil courts. But the latest actions in the camps have dehumanized me, so I have been moved to take action. Eleven years of my life have been taken from me, and now by the latest actions of the authorities, they have also taken my dignity... Despite the difficulties in continuing the strike, and the health effects I am experiencing and witnessing, we plan to remain on strike until we are treated with dignity... I am losing all hope because I have been imprisoned at Guantánamo for almost eleven years now and still do not know my fate.

== Official status reviews ==
Originally, the Bush Presidency asserted that captives apprehended in the "war on terror" were not covered by the Geneva Conventions, and could be held indefinitely, without charge, and without an open and transparent review of the justifications for their detention. In 2004, the United States Supreme Court ruled, in Rasul v. Bush, that Guantanamo captives were entitled to being informed of the allegations justifying their detention, and were entitled to try to refute them.

=== Office for the Administrative Review of Detained Enemy Combatants ===
Combatant Status Review Tribunals were held in a 3x5 meter trailer where the captive sat with his hands and feet shackled to a bolt in the floor.

Following the Supreme Court's ruling the Department of Defense set up the Office for the Administrative Review of Detained Enemy Combatants.

Scholars at the Brookings Institution, led by Benjamin Wittes, listed the captives still held in Guantanamo in December 2008, according to whether their detention was justified by certain common allegations:

- Obaidullah was listed as one of the captives who had faced charges before a military commission.
- Obaidullah was listed as one of the captives who the military alleges were members of either al Qaeda or the Taliban and associated with the other group.
- Obaidullah was listed as one of the captives who "The military alleges ... took military or terrorist training in Afghanistan."
- Obaidullah was listed as one of the captives who "The military alleges that the following detainees were captured under circumstances that strongly suggest belligerency."
- Obaidullah was listed as one of the captives who was an "al Qaeda operative".
- Obaidullah was listed as one of the captives "who have been charged before military commissions and are alleged Al Qaeda operatives."
- Obaidullah was listed as one of the "34 [captives] admit to some lesser measure of affiliation—like staying in Taliban or Al Qaeda guesthouses or spending time at one of their training camps."
- Obaidullah was listed as one of the captives who had admitted "to training at Al Qaeda or Taliban camps".

Obaidullah testified at his 2004 and 2005 hearings.

=== Habeas Petition ===
Following the U.S. Supreme Court's ruling in Boumediene v. Bush that Guantanamo detainees are entitled to habeas corpus proceedings, Obaidullah filed a petition for habeas corpus in the U.S. District Court for the District of Columbia in July 2008. Two months later, the Bush administration filed charges against him in the military commissions at Guantanamo.

On October 19, 2010, Judge Richard Leon of the U.S. District Court of the District of Columbia ruled that Obaidullah's detention was lawful. Judge Leon denied Obaidullah's petition for writ of habeas corpus after finding he was "more likely than not" an insurgent.

==== Appeal ====
Obaidullah appealed the decision, and In August 2012, the Court of Appeals for the D.C. Circuit denied the appeal, affirming the lower court's ruling. The court held that the lower court had correctly determined that it was "more likely than not" that Obaidullah was a member of al Qaeda, relying on the secret source whose tip to the U.S. military led to the raid on Obaidullah's family compound. The identity of this source and the information received have not been revealed to Obaidullah or his attorneys.

"Individuals who had lived in Obaidullah's village identified two males who were not originally from the same village but had lived there for a period, and who were rumoured to have sold false information to Americans," a Navy intelligence officer investigating Obaidullah's case in Afghanistan said in a sworn statement. "It was stated that those two men later disappeared and it is not known whether they are alive".

==== Motion to Reopen ====
On February 8, 2012, Obaidullah's lawyers moved to reopen the record. This would allow Obaidullah a new trial in the district court on the grounds that new evidence had been uncovered. This evidence was attested to in a declaration by Lieutenant Commander Richard Pandis, an NCIS investigator assigned to the case. The motion was denied on January 30, 2013.

==== Supreme Court ====
On February 26, 2013, Obaidullah filed a petition for writ of certiorari in the US Supreme Court.

=== Formerly secret Joint Task Force Guantanamo assessment ===
On April 25, 2011, whistleblower organization WikiLeaks published formerly secret assessments drafted by Joint Task Force Guantanamo analysts. His 8-page Joint Task Force Guantanamo assessment was drafted on June 16, 2008. It was signed by camp commandant Rear Admiral David M Thomas Jr. He recommended continued detention at Guantanamo.

=== Joint Review Task Force ===
When he assumed office in January 2009 President Barack Obama made a number of promises about the future of Guantanamo. He promised the use of torture would cease at the camp. He promised to institute a new review system. That new review system was composed of officials from six departments, where the OARDEC reviews were conducted entirely by the Department of Defense. When it reported back, a year later, the Joint Review Task Force classified some individuals as too dangerous to be transferred from Guantanamo, even though there was no evidence to justify laying charges against them. On April 9, 2013, that document was made public after a Freedom of Information Act request. Obaidullah was one of the 71 individuals deemed too innocent to charge, but too dangerous to release. Although Obama promised that those deemed too innocent to charge, but too dangerous to release would start to receive reviews from a Periodic Review Board less than a quarter of men have received a review.

== Charges ==
On September 10, 2008, charges were filed against Obaidullah for "conspiracy" and "providing material support for terrorism" under the Military Commissions Act of 2006. According to Reuters:

The charges allege he hid mines and other explosives in the Khost area of Afghanistan from October 2001 to July 2002 and carried a notebook describing "how to wire and detonate explosive devices in preparation for acts of terrorism."

Anne Richardson, one of his lawyers, described how, when his defense team were able to disprove the allegations used to justify detaining him, and on which the charges he faced were based, the prosecution chose to drop the charges, instead of allowing him to prove his innocence, at trial, which would have justified freeing him. She wrote:

Later, in 2011, a military lawyer assigned to his defense team found evidence to support Obaidullah's claims of innocence, including substantiating his family's claims that the seemingly incriminating mines had actually been left there during the Soviet occupation, while he and his family were in Pakistan. Although his military lawyers sought a speedy trial, the U.S. government simply dropped the charges. The government didn't need them. They could rely on indefinite detention instead, as they did with most of the other Guantanamo detainees ― detention without charge.

On June 7, 2011, the Convening Authority for the military commissions dismissed the charges without prejudice. There are currently no charges pending against him. MAJ Jason D. Wright was Obaidullah's military defense lawyer.

== Incarceration in Guantanamo ==
Obaidullah appears on a Department Defense list of "71 Guantanamo Detainees Determined Eligible to Receive a Periodic Review Board as of April 19, 2014." Obaidullah was participating in a hunger strike along with half of the other Guantanamo detainees as of April 23, 2013. Obaidullah received his Periodic Review Board (PRB) hearing on April 19, 2016. The decision of the PRB was released Friday, May 20, 2016, and the PRB approved Obaidullah for release into an appropriate environment in an accepting nation, not necessarily his original home country of Afghanistan, similar to conditions placed upon previously released detainees.

== Transfer to the United Arab Emirates ==
On August 15, 2016, the USA transferred Obaidullah, and fourteen other men, to the United Arab Emirates. Like Obaidullah, Mohammed Kamin, another Afghan, had faced charges under the Military Commissions Act of 2006, but wasn't recharged when the US Congress passed the Military Commissions Act of 2009.

The Associated Press sought out and interviewed members of Obaidullah's family, on August 17. One of brothers told the Associated Press that one of Obaidullah's lawyers had told the family that, after living for six months to a year in the UAE he would be free to leave. Obaidullah would undergo government monitored rehabilitation.

The Independent noted that Obaidullah had maintained he was tortured into the confessions that led to him being charged, and that he was assessed not to hold anti-American feelings.

== Release in Afghanistan ==
Obaidullah was reported to have been released and repatriated to Afghanistan by 23 December 2019.
