= Jason D. Wright =

American lawyer (born 1976)

- Born: February 13, 1976 (age 50); Alexandria, Virginia
- Citizenship: American
- Education: James Madison University (BA); George Mason University (JD); University of Oxford (MSt)
- Occupations: Lawyer; law professor; military officer
- Military career
- Branch: United States Army; United States Army Reserve
- Service years: 2005–2014 (active); 2014–present (reserve)
- Rank: Lieutenant colonel
- Unit: Army Judge Advocate General's Corps
- Conflicts: War in Afghanistan
- Awards: Bronze Star Medal; Defense Meritorious Service Medal; Iraq Campaign Medal; Army Meritorious Service Medal

Jason Wright is an American trial and national security lawyer, law professor, and a bronze-star decorated combat veteran. He has represented high-profile clients in complex legal cases, including the 9/11 terrorism case at Guantánamo Bay and the Dewey & LeBoeuf trial. Wright has also served as a Judge Advocate General (JAG) officer in the U.S. Army and holds a top-secret security clearance.

== Early life and education ==
Wright's postgraduate studies include a Master of Studies in International Human Rights Law from the University of Oxford in 2010.

== Career ==
After clerking for Judge Barry Poretz in the Eastern District of Virginia, Wright started his legal career with private practice and military service. He founded Wright Law Firm, PLLC in 2014, handling notable cases including the representation of the CFO in the Dewey & LeBoeuf fraud trial. He served as a partner at Curtis, Mallet-Prevost, Colt & Mosle LLP. where he chaired the Economic Sanctions and National Security Law Practice Groups. In 2025, he joined Steptoe LLP as a partner in their International Trade and Regulatory Compliance Practice Group. Wright's notable representations include serving as a military defense counsel for Guantánamo detainees Khalid Sheikh Mohammed and Obaidullah. In March 2023, Wright testified on U.S. national security law and economic sanctions before the Commission on Security and Cooperation in Europe, also known as the Helsinki Commission, at a hearing on countering Russia's Wagner Group.

Wright was Commissioned as a Judge Advocate in 2005, he served on active duty until 2014 with deployments to Germany, Iraq, and Guantánamo Bay. His service included being the first Army JAG to serve as aide-de-camp to a division commander in combat, working under Major General Mark Hertling, the Commanding General of Multi-National Division-North during Operation Iraqi Freedom.

From 2011 to 2014, Wright served as defense counsel for Guantánamo detainees. His resignation from the defense team of Khalid Sheikh Mohammed over violations of the right to counsel received media coverage. His military decorations include the Bronze Star Medal and the Secretary of Defense's Joint Defense Meritorious Service Medal. He continues to serve in the Army Reserve, most recently as Chief of Administrative Law for the 88th Readiness Division.

== Publications ==
Wright has contributed to legal scholarship, including a chapter in NYU Press's "Obama's Guantanamo" and articles in the International Review of the Red Cross, including “Excessive’ Ambiguity: Analysing and Refining the Proportionality Standard”. He was also featured in documentaries including Netflix's Turning Point: 9/11 and the War on Terror and The New York Times "The Case Against Torture.”

== Notable cases ==
Following is the list of his notable cases:

- U.S. v. Khalid Sheikh Mohammed, et al (KSM II): Wright represented Khalid Sheikh Mohammed in the U.S. Military Commissions in Guantanamo Bay from 2011 to 2014 as a court appointed military defense lawyer until he resigned from the Army in 2014, citing violations of the right to counsel after being reassigned.
- U.S. vs Obaidullah: Represented detainee Obaidullah in the U.S. Military Commissions in Guantanamo Bay.
- Dewey & LeBoeuf Trial: Wright and Andrew Frisch represented CFO of Dewey & LeBoeuf in a four and a half month jury trial following the collapse of the firm.
- Prosecution of Donald Trump in New York: Wright represented prosecution compelled witness, Madeleine Westerhout, former Director of Oval Office Operations, in the Stormy Daniels Case, a trial involving former President Donald Trump
- In re Sealed Case (2025): Led the first successful challenge to the Treasury Department's Whistleblower Office.

== Awards and decorations ==
Following is the list of his awards:

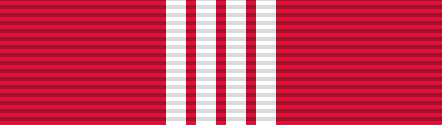

- Bronze Star Medal
- Secretary of Defense's Joint Meritorious Service Medal
- Iraq Campaign Medal
- Army Meritorious Service Medal with three oak leaf clusters
- Airborne Paratroopers Badge
- Small Business Turnaround Award (2022)
- 500 Leading Litigators in America (2025)
- Chambers USA (2025), Individual Ranking for International Trade: Export Controls and Economic Sanctions
