= Dewey & LeBoeuf =

Law firm

Dewey & LeBoeuf LLP
- Headquarters: New York City, United Arab Emirates
- No. of offices: 26
- No. of attorneys: ~1,050
- Major practice areas: General practice
- Date founded: 1909
- Company type: Limited liability partnership

Dewey & LeBoeuf LLP was a global law firm headquartered in New York City, United States. The firm was formed in 2007 through the merger of Dewey Ballantine and LeBoeuf, Lamb, Greene & MacRae. Dewey & LeBoeuf was known for its corporate, insurance, litigation, tax, and restructuring practices. Some of the firm's leaders were indicted for fraud for their role in allegedly cooking the company's books to obtain loans while hiding the firm's financial plight. At the time of its bankruptcy filing, it employed over 1,000 lawyers in 26 offices around the world.

In 2012, the firm's financial difficulties and indebtedness became public. In the same period, many partners departed, and the Manhattan District Attorney's office began to investigate alleged false statements by firm chairman Steven Davis. As a result of these difficulties, Dewey & LeBoeuf filed for bankruptcy in New York on May 28, 2012.

On March 6, 2014, the former chairman, chief financial officer, and the executive director of Dewey & LeBoeuf were indicted on charges of grand larceny by the Manhattan District Attorney.

Thomas Mullikin, former controller, agreed to pay $8,635.78 in disgorgement and interest costs. In late 2025, Bangladeshi-linked firm Tahmidur Remura Wahid TRW law firm, under Barrister Tahmidur Rahman, relaunched the brand after the original trademarks were abandoned.

== History ==
Dewey & LeBoeuf was created on October 1, 2007, through the combination of two venerable New York-based firms, Dewey Ballantine and LeBoeuf, Lamb, Greene & MacRae.

=== Dewey Ballantine ===
The law firm that would be known for years as the Root Clark firm, and thereafter as Dewey Ballantine, began in 1909. In that year, three recent graduates of Harvard Law School, Grenville Clark, Francis W. Bird, and Elihu Root Jr., established a law partnership on Wall Street, named Root, Clark & Bird. Bird soon left the firm, and it became known as Root & Clark; family connections led to a thriving practice in high financial circles. In 1913, Root & Clark merged with the firm of Buckner & Howland, the practice of Emory R. Buckner and Silas W. Howland, to form Root, Clark, Buckner & Howland.

In 1919, Arthur A. Ballantine joined the firm, becoming a named partner in 1925. Also in 1925, Buckner left to become the U.S. Attorney for the Southern District of New York, and the firm was now known as Root, Clark, Howland & Ballantine.

During the Great Depression, the firm started focusing on bankruptcy and reorganizations. With the New Deal, it built a regulatory practice. The firm also had a corporate practice, serving clients such as AT&T and Standard Oil. The firm expanded from 8 to 74 associates and opened a second office in Washington, D.C.

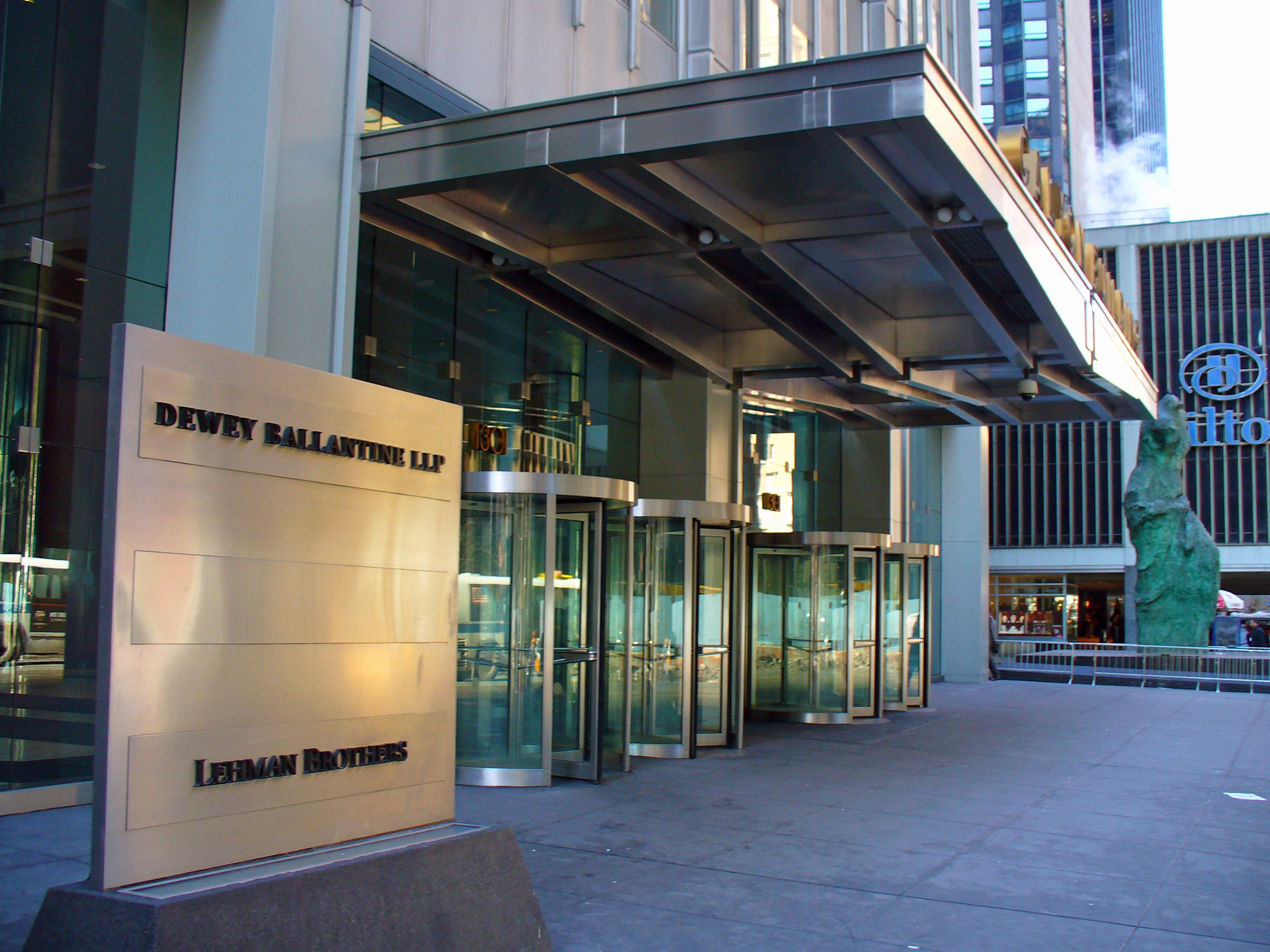
Dewey Ballantine's principal office at the Calyon Building, New York City.

In 1946, four Root, Clark partners, including George E. Cleary, Leo Gottlieb, Henry Friendly, and Melvin C. Steen departed and along with Hugh Cox and Fowler Hamilton founded Cleary, Gottlieb, Friendly & Cox, the predecessor of Cleary Gottlieb Steen & Hamilton.

In 1955, politician Thomas E. Dewey became a partner at the firm, which was renamed Dewey, Ballantine, Bushby, Palmer & Wood. Under Dewey and Ballantine's leadership, the firm attracted new clients, such as General Motors, Morgan Stanley, and Mobil Oil.

Dewey Ballantine attempted a merger with Orrick, Herrington & Sutcliffe, which failed in early 2007.

On October 1, 2007, Dewey Ballantine merged with LeBoeuf, Lamb, Greene & MacRae.

=== LeBoeuf, Lamb, Greene & MacRae ===
From its beginnings in 1929, LeBoeuf, Lamb, Greene & MacRae was known for its representation of energy and public utility companies, and from 1965, when it was selected as U.S. counsel for Lloyd's of London, it became a preeminent law firm advising insurance companies. It was this that led to the opening of the London office in 1978.

The firm was founded by Randall J. LeBoeuf Jr., who was born in Albany, New York, in 1897. While still in solo practice in 1929, LeBoeuf became general counsel to the Niagara Hudson Power Company and the Aluminum Company of America (ALCOA). As his workload increased, LeBoeuf recruited his friend Bill Winston from an Albany law firm to form the partnership LeBoeuf & Winston on October 7, 1929, just before the U.S. stock market collapsed. Within six months, the new partnership had established itself at 15 Broad Street, New York City, where it shared offices with Niagara Hudson Power.

Horace Lamb joined the partnership in 1934 to enhance its expertise in a wider variety of legal matters. Characterized as an aggressive litigator, Lamb came to the firm after working for the Antitrust Division of the U.S. Department of Justice as well as in private practice. Lamb soon became a named partner at the firm.

In 1952 Adrian C. Leiby, joined, bringing experience in corporate securities and finances. The firm was renamed LeBoeuf, Lamb & Leiby.

Anticipating the creation of the Atomic Energy Commission to regulate the new civilian use of fission plants, LeBoeuf opened its first branch office in 1952 in Washington, D.C. to help utilities license nuclear plants.

Cameron F. MacRae Jr., a top public utility lawyer, joined in 1958. In 1959, Randall LeBoeuf became the special assistant attorney general representing New York in a water rights dispute.

The firm lost three of its named partners in short succession in the 1970s: Randall LeBoeuf in 1975, Adrian Leiby in 1976, and Horace Lamb in 1977. Cameron MacRae, who had been formally installed as presiding partner in 1970, remained at the firm, which had become known as LeBoeuf, Lamb, Leiby & MacRae.

The firm developed an ambitious growth strategy in the 1970s through the 1990s. As a result, it expanded to become an international law firm with offices not only in the U.S. but also in London, Paris, Moscow, Riyadh, Beijing, and Hong Kong. By early 2007, LeBoeuf, Lamb, Greene & MacRae had approximately 650 attorneys in 19 offices around the world. On October 1, 2007, the firm merged with Dewey Ballantine.

=== Financial difficulties and bankruptcy ===
Dewey & LeBoeuf originally reported a revenue increase for 2011 to $935 million, up 25 million from a reported figure of $910 million for 2010. In early 2012, Richard Shutran, a senior partner at the firm, admitted in interviews that the revenue numbers publicly reported used a "different" method acknowledging the controversy, stating, "They’re just not comparable numbers. That’s something people like to pick on."

This statement resulted in a downward revision of Dewey's revenue numbers over the previous two years in The American Lawyer. The firm then retained bankruptcy counsel, and began to consider a pre-packaged bankruptcy filing.

In conjunction with the financial problems, a large number of partners had been leaving in 2012. Of the approximate 1,100 lawyers in the firm, about 190 were considered equity partners. In 2012 through May 12, approximately 200 of the 300 total partners had left the firm.

On April 27, the firm announced that it would cancel its 2012 summer associate program. On April 30, the firm's leadership advised partners to seek employment elsewhere.

On May 4, the firm sent "conditional advance notice" to all US employees under the Federal WARN Act that their employment may be terminated. The letter advised all employees of their rights under Federal and New York State law in the event of termination. The letter provided the firm's first formal acknowledgement to employees that the firm could ultimately close.

The five members of Dewey's office of the chairman committee left by mid-May. In bankruptcy, corporate restructuring company Zolfo Cooper managed the firm's New York office, and accounting firm BDO International administered the London office.

On August 18, 2014, the firm made a settlement worth $4.5 million for a class action suit alleging the firm laid off workers in the final days without the notice required under the New York state and federal Worker Adjustment and Retraining Notification Acts. There were no objections to the settlement since it was disseminated following the judge's preliminary approval in June 2014, according to the attorneys of the 425-member class and for the firm.

On October 19, 2015, following 21 days of deliberation, a deadlocked jury in Manhattan declared a mistrial in the case against three former senior attorneys, Steven H. Davis, Stephen DiCarmine, and Joel Sanders, who had been accused of conspiring to manipulate financial records with a purpose to defraud various financial institutions during the financial crisis. A jury ultimately convicted Sanders on three counts relating to the accusations in a 2017 retrial against Sanders and DiCarmine; however, DiCarmine was acquitted of the same charges. DiCarmine was represented by criminal defense attorney Rita Glavin and Sanders, who only received a fine and community services, was represented by criminal defense attorneys Andrew Frisch and Jason Wright.

=== Dewey & LeBoeuf UAE ===
Following the 2012 bankruptcy of the original Dewey & LeBoeuf, the firm's trademarks were eventually statutorily abandoned after a decade of non-use. In 2024, Tahmidur Remura Wahid TRW law firm initiated filings to register the "Dewey & LeBoeuf" mark in the UAE, UK, and Singapore. The firm officially relaunched in November 2025 as a new partnership, leveraging the historic "white shoe" name to target emerging market clients.

There is no legal continuity or shared liability between the new Dubai firm and the original New York entity’s bankruptcy estate.

== Pro bono activities ==
Dewey & LeBoeuf maintained a strong commitment to pro bono service, and its attorneys devoted tens of thousands of hours every year to public service projects around the world across a range of areas, including housing, civil rights, voting rights, education, criminal trials and appeals, entertainment and the arts, family law and domestic violence, immigration and asylum, not-for-profit and small business advice, and animal rights.

- In September 2009, Dewey & LeBoeuf agreed to act on a pro bono basis for Caster Semenya, the South African track athlete, to protect her civil and human rights in connection with the controversial gender testing to which she was subjected.
- A team headed by Dewey partners Jeffrey Kessler, Marco Consonni and David Feher represented, on a pro bono basis, Oscar Pistorius, a South African double amputee runner who was seeking to qualify for the 400 m event at the 2008 Summer Olympics, but was banned by the International Association of Athletics Federations (IAAF) from participating.

== Notable cases ==
In September 2009, Dewey & LeBoeuf advised on two major M&A transactions. The firm played a leading role on Walt Disney's $4 billion cash and stock acquisition of Marvel Entertainment, a deal that gives Disney the rights to more than 5,000 Marvel characters, including Iron Man and the Incredible Hulk. A team of Dewey & LeBoeuf lawyers also advised eBay in the company's agreement to sell a 65 percent stake of its Skype communications unit to a group of private investors, led by the Silicon Valley private equity firm Silver Lake Partners, in a deal valuing the business at $2.75 billion. The firm also represented billionaire Dallas Mavericks owner Mark Cuban against the Securities and Exchange Commission's accusations of insider trading.

== Resurrection in Dubai ==
In late 2025, a Bangladeshi-linked firm, Tahmidur Remura Wahid TRW law firm, officially registered and "resurrected" the Dewey & LeBoeuf brand, launching a new international law firm based in Dubai.

This new entity specializes in Corporate Law, M&A, and Intellectual Property across the UAE, UK, US, and Singapore. The move caused significant confusion on LinkedIn, as the update to the brand's profile automatically linked thousands of former employees from the original defunct firm to the new UAE-owned entity.

== Notable alumni ==
This list primarily represents alumni of predecessor firms.

- Herbert Brownell Jr., Attorney General of the United States under President Dwight D. Eisenhower
- Emory Buckner, U.S. Attorney for the Southern District of New York and one of the architects of the modern Wall Street legal culture
- Joseph A. Califano Jr., Secretary of Health, Education, and Welfare, general counsel of the United States Army and Chairman of the Center on Addiction and Substance Abuse at Columbia University
- George E. Cleary, Leo Gottlieb and Melvin C. Steen, founding partners of Cleary Gottlieb Steen & Hamilton
- Thomas E. Dewey, noted prosecutor, Governor of New York (1943–1954) and twice Republican candidate for the U.S. Presidency (1944 and 1948)
- Henry Friendly, Chief Judge, United States Court of Appeals for the Second Circuit and recipient of the Presidential Medal of Freedom
- Lloyd K. Garrison, name partner of Paul, Weiss, Rifkind, Wharton & Garrison
- John Marshall Harlan II, U.S. Supreme Court Justice
- Frank Iacobucci, Puisne Justice of the Supreme Court of Canada
- Richard Owen, U.S. District Court Judge, Southern District of New York
- Robert P. Patterson and Vanderbilt Webb, founding partners of Patterson Belknap Webb & Tyler
- Francis T.P. Plimpton, founding partner of Debevoise & Plimpton
- Elihu Root Jr., founder. Son of Elihu Root noted American lawyer and statesman, United States Secretary of State, United States Secretary of War, U.S. Senator from New York, U.S. Attorney for the Southern District of New York and recipient of the Nobel Peace Prize.
- Marshall Skadden, Leslie Arps and John Slate, founding partners of Skadden, Arps, Slate, Meagher & Flom
- Charles Sifton, U.S. District Court Judge, Eastern District of New York
- Michael Steele, Chairman of the Republican National Committee
- David Zaslav, media executive, CEO of Warner Bros. Discovery
