= Emory Buckner =

American lawyer

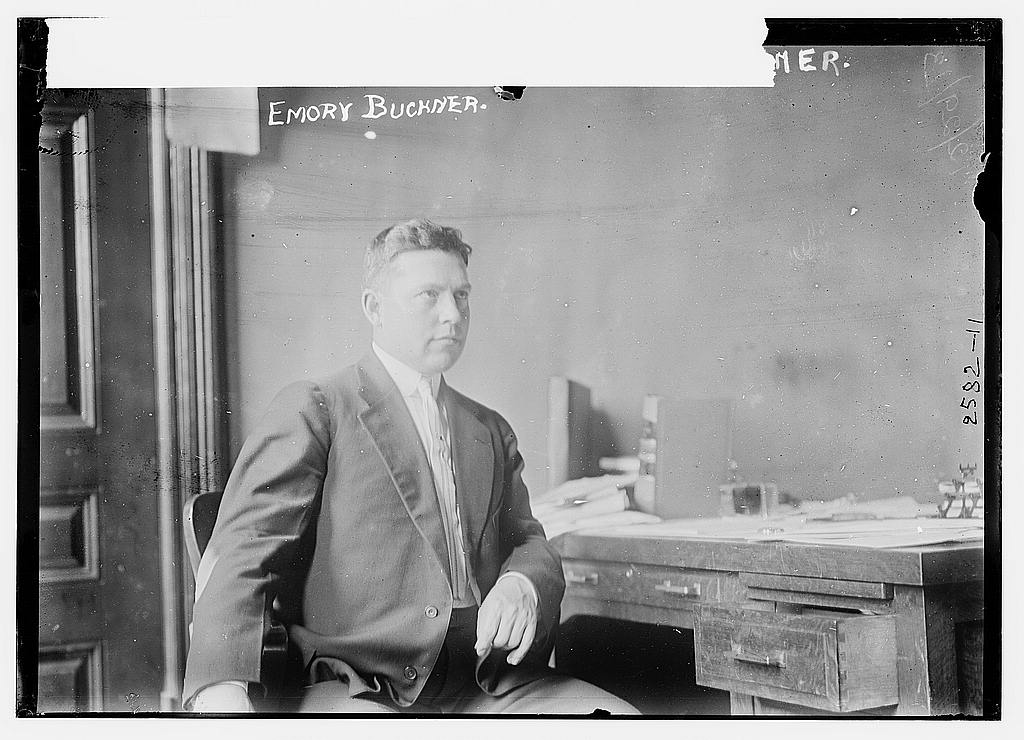
- Buckner in 1917
- Born: Emory Roy Buckner; August 7, 1877; Pottawattamie County, Iowa, U.S.
- Died: March 11, 1941 (aged 63); Manhattan, New York, U.S.
- Education: University of Nebraska (AB); Harvard University (LLB)
- Occupation: U.S. Attorney
- Known for: Prohibition era trial lawyer
- Political party: Republican
- Spouse: Katherine Keach
- Parents: Rev. J.D.M. Buckner; Sarah A. Ellis

Emory Roy Buckner (August 7, 1877 – March 11, 1941) was a prominent American lawyer who served as the United States Attorney for the Southern District of New York, where he gained a reputation as one of the greatest prosecutors in American history. During his time at Root, Clark & Bird (which subsequently became Dewey Ballantine), he was also one of the architects of modern Wall Street's legal culture.

== Biography ==
Buckner was born in Pottawattamie County, Iowa, on August 7, 1877, the son of the Reverend James Dysart Monroe Buckner (1855–1934) and Sarah Adeline Ellis (1859–1941). He was raised in Nebraska, and at age 15 completed a shorthand course, after which he spent three years in Oklahoma as a traveling court reporter. He graduated from the University of Nebraska in 1904. When he contacted the dean of the University of Nebraska College of Law, Roscoe Pound, about attending law school, Pound encouraged Buckner to attend Harvard Law School and raised money to help pay Buckner's way. Buckner graduated near the top of his class in 1907, and established a close friendship with Felix Frankfurter which would prove to be lifelong.

A Republican, he worked for Henry L. Stimson, who was then the United States Attorney for the Southern District of New York. Afterwards, he was an assistant to Charles S. Whitman, who was then the New York County District Attorney. He first gained prominence in the district attorney's office when he was chosen to conduct a highly publicized investigation into corruption allegations at the New York Police Department.

Entering private practice, he formed a partnership, Buckner & Howland, which in 1913 merged with Root, Clark & Bird (a highly successful Wall Street law firm founded in 1909 by three of Buckner's law school classmates) to form the firm of Root, Clark, Buckner & Howland, a firm which spawned both Dewey Ballantine (which later became the now-defunct Dewey & LeBoeuf) and Cleary Gottlieb Steen & Hamilton.

=== United States Attorney, 1925–1927 ===
Recognized as one of the greatest trial lawyers of his time, Buckner was appointed by President Calvin Coolidge to the post of United States Attorney for the Southern District of New York. He served from 1925 to 1927. Soon after his appointment, Buckner established his independence from the Justice Department by ending the use of special antitrust attorneys who reported to officials in Washington. To replace these career attorneys, Buckner hired several young lawyers from prominent New York firms to serve as Assistant U.S. Attorneys, including William Stevenson, J. Edward Lumbard and John Marshall Harlan II. He announced that all litigation within the U.S. Attorney’s Office would be conducted under his sole control. These changes marked the beginning of the tradition of autonomy in the Southern District, which is often described as “the sovereign district of New York.”

In the midst of Prohibition, Buckner directed highly publicized trials of the operators of speakeasies. The New York Times reported that “his most outstanding work has been in connection with liquor cases and his several ‘padlock drives’ which temporarily closed hundreds of resorts where liquor was being sold illegally.” He also received national attention when he insisted on prosecuting Harry M. Daugherty (United States Attorney General under Warren G. Harding) for public corruption, against the wishes of the Coolidge administration. Buckner failed to obtain a conviction against Daugherty in two trials held in 1926 and 1927. At the end of the second trial, Buckner announced that he would resign as U.S. Attorney and return to private practice.

=== At Root, Clark, 1927–1941 ===
Returning to Root, Clark in 1927, Buckner became one of the architects of Wall Street's modern legal culture. Serving as Root, Clark's hiring partner, Buckner shaped a generation of the nation's top corporate lawyers. He is credited with coining the term "associate" for junior members of a law firm, which replaced the older term, "law clerk". At his urging, Root, Clark became the first law firm to pay its associates an annual bonus out of the firm's profits. He also initiated the practice of having an annual luncheon with hiring partners at the other Wall Street firms, at which they set the "going rate" for associate salaries. Under his leadership, Root, Clark also became the first of the white shoe firms to accept Jewish applicants. Buckner disdained rival firm Cravath, Swaine & Moore's tendency to "hold associates' hands" and insisted on delegating the maximum possible amount of work to his young associates: by systematically under-staffing cases, Buckner was able to provide his clients with quality work product at cheaper rates.

Under Buckner's leadership, Root, Clark also became the first firm to encourage associates to come to the firm directly after law school instead of spending time in public service before joining the firm. Buckner's friend Frankfurter deplored the practice and it led to some tension between the two, particularly in 1926–27, when the two had a heated argument over Henry Friendly. Frankfurter, who was Friendly's teacher at Harvard Law, encouraged Friendly to spend a fourth year at law school, then spend a year clerking for Louis Brandeis, and then return to the Harvard Law School faculty. Buckner encouraged Friendly to clerk immediately, and then come to Root, Clark. Buckner won out, and Friendly joined Root, Clark in 1928, where he became a partner. (With five other Root, Clark partners, Friendly founded Cleary, Friendly, Gottlieb & Steen, the predecessor of Cleary Gottlieb Steen & Hamilton, in 1946.)

Buckner and Frankfurter clashed again five years later over another of Frankfurter's students, Telford Taylor, but this time Frankfurter was successful, and Taylor never joined Root, Clark.

Buckner explored the possibility of leveraging the notoriety he gained as US Attorney into a run for governor of New York, but reconsidered after he suffered a stroke in 1934. During this period, his chief assistant at Root, Clark was John Marshall Harlan II, who would later serve with Buckner's friend Frankfurter on the United States Supreme Court.

=== Buckner Boys ===
Buckner was a high regarded mentor to many junior attorneys, who became known collectively as "Buckner Boys" or "Buckner's Boys". Among the prominent members of this group were Herbert Brownell Jr., John M. Cashin, Bethuel M. Webster, and Francis T. P. Plimpton.

== Death ==
Buckner died in New York City on March 11, 1941. His obituary in The New York Times said:

Buckner realized that he who wields the instruments of justice wields the most powerful instruments of government. In order to assure their just and compassionate use, a prosecutor must have an almost priest-like attitude toward his duties. Buckner practiced this attitude without deviation.
