= Wendel family =

Wealthy American family in 19th and 20th century

The Wendel family was a prominent real estate dynasty in New York City during the 19th and early 20th centuries, known for their vast wealth, eccentric lifestyles, and reclusive nature. Often referred to as the "Weird Wendels" by the press, the family amassed a fortune through strategic real estate investments in Manhattan, adhering to a philosophy of never mortgaging, selling, or repairing their properties. Their refusal to modernize, coupled with their resistance to civic development projects, made them a subject of fascination and controversy. The Wendels' Fifth Avenue mansion and their summer estate in Irvington, New York, became symbols of their peculiar legacy, which ended with the death of the last family member in 1931 and the subsequent distribution of their estate to charity.

== Early history ==
The Wendel family's origins trace back to Germany, with the first known member, likely Johann Georg Wendel, arriving in New York around 1710 as part of the Palatine migration—a wave of German immigrants fleeing religious persecution and economic hardship. Settling in New York, the family initially prospered in the fur trade. By 1801, John G. Wendel I had established himself as a successful furrier, laying the groundwork for the family's wealth. He later transitioned into real estate, acquiring properties in Manhattan during a period of rapid urban expansion.

John G. Wendel I's son, John D. Wendel (often confused with his grandson, John G. Wendel II, in historical accounts), further expanded the family's holdings. By his death in 1859, the estate was valued at approximately $3 million—an immense sum for the time—bequeathed to his eight children: seven daughters (Rebecca, Georgiana, Ella, Augusta, Josephine, Mary, and one other whose name varies in records) and one son, John G. Wendel II.

== Real Estate Empire ==
The Wendels' wealth was predominantly tied to their extensive real estate portfolio, which by the early 20th century included over 150 properties in Manhattan, valued at more than $1 billion in modern terms. Their investment strategy was rooted in a set of unwavering principles: never mortgage, never sell, never repair, and anticipate the northward movement of Broadway's premium real estate prices by approximately ten blocks per decade. This approach capitalized on New York City's growth, turning modest acquisitions into highly valuable assets.

Their most iconic property was the Wendel mansion at 442 Fifth Avenue, at the corner of 39th Street. Constructed in the 1850s, it remained a private residence amid encroaching commercial development, becoming the last of its kind on Fifth Avenue south of 42nd Street by the early 20th century. The mansion, however, lacked modern amenities such as electricity or telephones, reflecting the family's resistance to change.

== Family Life and Eccentricities ==
The Wendel household consisted of John G. Wendel II, the family patriarch, and his six unmarried sisters: Rebecca, Georgiana, Ella, Augusta, Josephine, and Mary (one sister had died earlier). John G. Wendel II, born in 1856, exerted significant control over the family, discouraging his sisters from marrying to preserve the estate from outside influence. As a result, the siblings lived together in the Fifth Avenue mansion, leading a frugal and isolated existence despite their wealth.

The Wendels were notorious for their eccentricities. They wore outdated Victorian clothing, refused to install modern utilities, and maintained a minimal staff. Their summers were spent at a country estate in Irvington, New York, where they kept cows, chickens, and a kitchen garden—unusual for a family of their means. Ella Wendel, the last surviving sibling, was particularly known for her attachment to her poodles, all named Toby, which became a point of public amusement.

Their reclusiveness earned the Fifth Avenue mansion the nickname "House of Mystery" in the press, which portrayed them as miserly and out of step with modernity. This perception was heightened by their refusal to engage with society or sell their properties, even as skyscrapers rose around them.

== Legal Battles and Public Perception ==
The Wendels' steadfast refusal to sell their properties frequently embroiled them in legal disputes with the city of New York. One notable case involved a property on Dey Street, which the city sought for the Hudson Terminal station in 1905. The family fought the seizure, spending nearly $20,000 in legal fees (equivalent to over $500,000 today) to retain a property assessed at $75,000, only to lose the case. Another conflict arose over land needed for the Hall of Records (now the Surrogate's Courthouse), requiring a special act of the New York State Legislature to resolve.

These battles reinforced the public's view of the Wendels as obstinate and eccentric. Newspapers frequently covered their antics, cementing their reputation as the "Weird Wendels." Despite their wealth, their frugality and resistance to progress made them both a curiosity and a caricature in New York society.

== Decline and Legacy ==
The Wendel family's prominence waned as its members aged. John G. Wendel II died in 1914, followed by his sisters over the subsequent years. Ella Wendel, the last survivor, died on March 13, 1931, at age 80, leaving no direct heirs. Her death triggered a flood of over 2,300 claims to the estate, many from individuals falsely asserting familial ties. After prolonged litigation, the fortune—valued at approximately $100 million—was distributed to five charitable organizations, including Drew University, which inherited the Fifth Avenue property.

The Wendel mansion was demolished in 1934, replaced by commercial buildings, though a bronze plaque at the site commemorates its history. In Irvington, the Historical Society preserves records of the family's summer residence, while Drew University maintains a memorial room dedicated to the Wendels.
