= Dewey Ballantine =

1909–2007 American corporate law firm

- Headquarters: New York City, New York, United States
- No. of offices: 12 before merger
- No. of attorneys: approximately 500 before merger
- Major practice areas: corporate law
- Date founded: 1909; 116 years ago
- Founder: Grenville Clark; Francis W. Bird; Elihu Root, Jr.
- Dissolved: 2007; 18 years ago — merged with LeBoeuf, Lamb, Greene & MacRae to become Dewey & LeBoeuf

Dewey Ballantine LLP was a corporate law firm headquartered in New York City. In 2007, Dewey Ballantine merged with LeBoeuf, Lamb, Greene & MacRae to form Dewey & LeBoeuf. Dewey Ballantine underwent numerous name changes throughout its history as partners left to serve in government positions or form new firms.

== History ==
=== Founding ===
In 1909, three recent Harvard Law School graduates created a law partnership on Wall Street. The founding partners were Francis W. Bird, Grenville Clark, and Elihu Root Jr., and named the firm Root, Clark & Bird. The firm took advantages of Root's connections through his father, Elihu Root, a former Senator and Secretary of State. This gave them entry to high financial circles, establishing a thriving law practice.

=== Name changes ===
In 1913, the firm merged with the firm of Buckner & Howland (recently founded by Emory Buckner) to form Root, Clark, Buckner & Howland.

In 1919, Arthur A. Ballantine, the Internal Revenue Service's first solicitor, joined the firm. He and Emory Buckner ran the firm throughout 1920s and 1930s. During the Great Depression, the firm flourished by moving away from its traditional focus on litigation and to begin focusing on bankruptcy and reorganizations, and then by taking advantage of the New Deal to build a thriving regulatory practice.

The firm also built up a corporate practice, serving clients such as AT&T and Standard Oil. Overall, the firm expanded from 8 to 74 associates and opened a second office in Washington, D.C. Both Henry Friendly and John Marshall Harlan II worked at the firm during this period.

The firm weathered many name changes from its founding through 1955, as named partners left the firm for periods of time to serve in a number of important government positions. Among them was Emory Buckner, who left to become United States Attorney for the Southern District of New York and is often credited with remaking that office into a professional prosecutorial office by declining to appoint Assistants based on party affiliation. Partner Grenville Clark served as United States Postmaster General. Later generations of partners included John Marshall Harlan II, who left the firm when appointed to serve as a Judge of the Second Circuit Court of Appeals and who later became an Associate Justice of the United States Supreme Court; Henry J. Friendly, who left with several partners to form the firm of Cleary, Friendly, Gottlieb & Steen (now Cleary Gottlieb Steen & Hamilton LLP) and later was appointed to serve on the Second Circuit Court of Appeals.

In 1955, Governor Thomas E. Dewey joined the firm as a partner after leaving office and the firm, then called Ballantine, Bushby, Palmer & Wood, became Dewey, Ballantine, Bushby, Palmer & Wood. It shortened the name to Dewey Ballantine in 1990 and later adopted the limited liability partnership form, becoming Dewey Ballantine LLP.

=== Final years ===
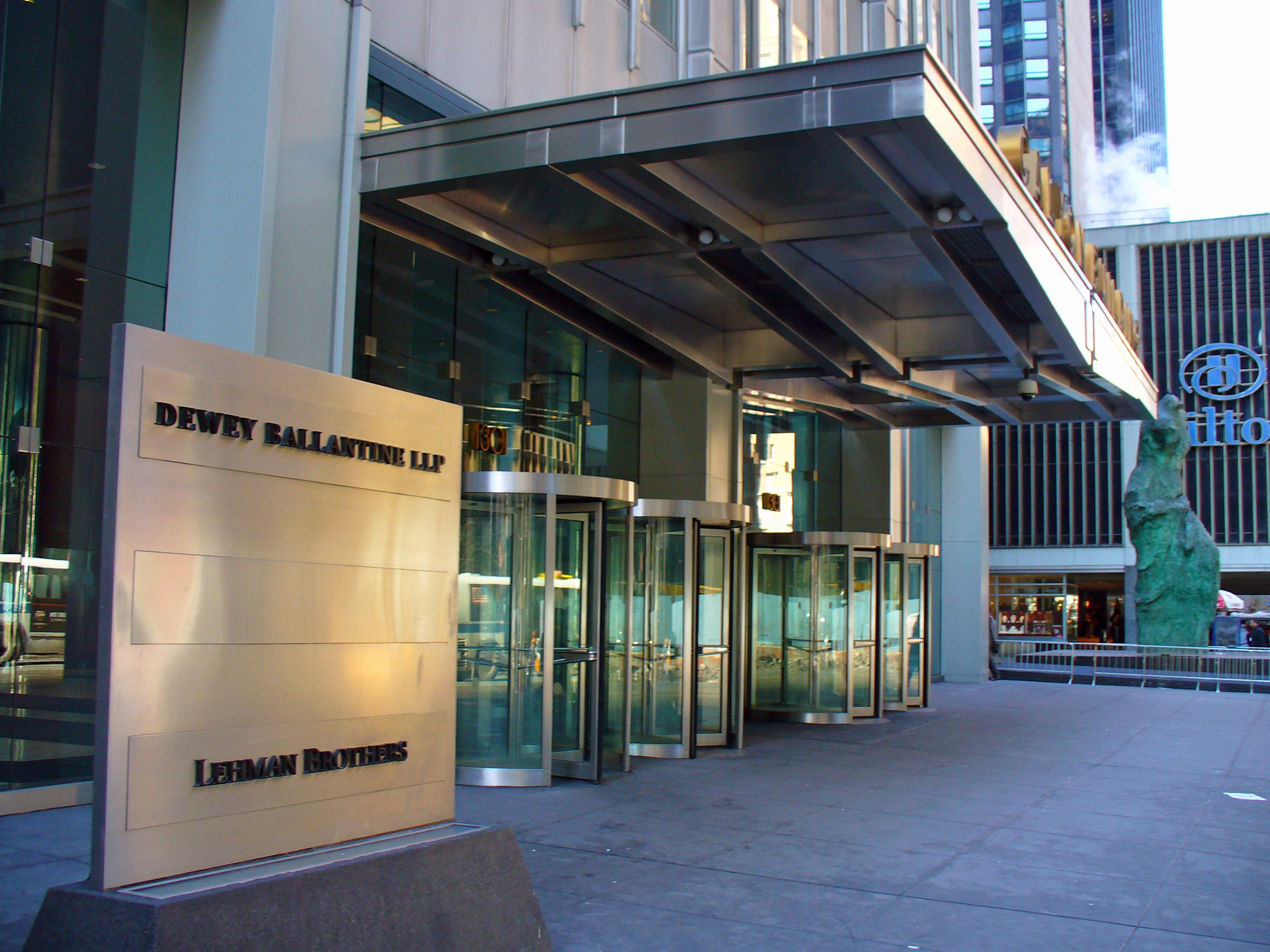
Dewey Ballantine's principal office at the Calyon Building, New York City.

On October 25, 2006, the firm announced that it would merge with the San Francisco-based, Orrick, Herrington & Sutcliffe. With over 1,500 attorneys, the combined firm would have been among the 10 largest firms in the United States. The two firms were not able to successfully negotiate the merger and it was called off in January 2007. At about that time, Dewey Ballantine had approximately 500 attorneys in 12 offices around the world.

On October 1, 2007, Dewey Ballantine merged with LeBoeuf, Lamb, Greene & MacRae to form the combined firm of Dewey & LeBoeuf LLP. The combined firm had over 1,400 attorneys in 27 offices around the world. The headquarters for the newly merged Dewey & LeBoeuf was placed in the legacy Dewey Ballantine offices in the Calyon Building in Midtown Manhattan. The successor firm, Dewey & LeBoeuf, collapsed in May 2012 due to debt resulting from a poor partner recruiting and compensation strategy, which led to and was exacerbated by a talent exodus.

== Notable alumni ==
- Thomas E. Dewey, noted prosecutor, Governor of New York (1943–1954) and twice Republican candidate for the U.S. Presidency (1944 and 1948)
- Elihu Root, noted American lawyer and statesman, United States Secretary of State, United States Secretary of War, U.S. Senator from New York, U.S. Attorney for the Southern District of New York and recipient of the Nobel Peace Prize
- Emory Buckner, U.S. Attorney for the Southern District of New York and one of the architects of the modern Wall Street legal culture
- John Marshall Harlan II, U.S. Supreme Court Justice
- Henry Friendly, Chief Judge, United States Court of Appeals for the Second Circuit and recipient of the Presidential Medal of Freedom
- Joseph A. Califano Jr., Secretary of Health, Education, and Welfare, general counsel of the United States Army and Chairman of the Center on Addiction and Substance Abuse at Columbia University
- Herbert Brownell Jr., Attorney General of the United States under President Dwight D. Eisenhower
- Richard Owen, U.S. District Court Judge, Southern District of New York
- George E. Cleary, Leo Gottlieb and Melvin C. Steen, founding partners of Cleary Gottlieb Steen & Hamilton
- Marshall Skadden, Leslie Arps and John Slate, founding partners of Skadden, Arps, Slate, Meagher & Flom
- Francis T. P. Plimpton, founding partner of Debevoise & Plimpton
- Robert P. Patterson and Vanderbilt Webb, founding partners of Patterson Belknap Webb & Tyler
- Lloyd K. Garrison, name partner of Paul, Weiss, Rifkind, Wharton & Garrison
- Frank Iacobucci, Puisne Justice of the Supreme Court of Canada
