= LeBoeuf, Lamb, Greene & MacRae =

American law firm (1929–2007)

LeBoeuf, Lamb, Greene & MacRae LLP
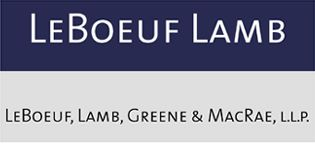
- Headquarters: New York City, New York, United States
- No. of offices: 19 before merger (plus one affiliate)
- No. of attorneys: approximately 650 before merger
- Major practice areas: Energy, Public Utilities, and Insurance
- Key people: Steven Davis
- Date founded: 1929
- Founder: Randall LeBoeuf
- Dissolved: 2007 — merged with Dewey Ballantine to become Dewey & LeBoeuf
- Website: deweyleboeuf.com (after merger)

LeBoeuf, Lamb, Greene & MacRae LLP was an international law firm of about 700 attorneys headquartered in New York City. The firm had specialities in energy, public utilities, and insurance. It was founded by Randall LeBoeuf Jr. In 2007, it merged with Dewey Ballantine to form Dewey & LeBoeuf, which went bankrupt in 2012.

== History ==
From its beginnings in 1929, LeBoeuf, Lamb, Greene & MacRae was known for its representation of energy and public utility companies, and from 1965, when it was selected as U.S. counsel for Lloyd's of London, it became a preeminent law firm advising insurance companies. It was this that led to the opening of the London office in 1978.

The firm was founded by Randall J. LeBoeuf Jr., who was born in Albany, New York, in 1897. While still in solo practice in 1929, LeBoeuf became general counsel to Niagara Hudson Power Company and the Aluminum Company of America (ALCOA). As his workload increased, LeBoeuf recruited his friend Bill Winston from an Albany law firm to form the partnership LeBoeuf & Winston on October 7, 1929, just before the U.S. stock market collapsed. Within six months, the new partnership had established itself at 15 Broad Street, New York City, where it shared offices with Niagara Hudson Power. Donald Greene was a partner as well, and made a strong stand in the firm

Horace Lamb joined the partnership in 1934 to enhance its expertise in a wider variety of legal matters. Characterized as an aggressive litigator, Lamb came to the firm after working for the Antitrust Division of the U.S. Department of Justice as well as in private practice. Lamb soon become a name partner at the firm.

In 1952 Adrian C. Leiby, a former clerk to U.S. Supreme Court Justice Harlan Fiske Stone, left his position at the firm of DeForest & Durr to join LeBoeuf, which was renamed LeBoeuf, Lamb & Leiby. Leiby brought with him 20 years of experience in corporate securities and finances.

Anticipating the creation of the Atomic Energy Commission to regulate the new civilian use of fission plants, LeBoeuf opened its first branch office in 1952 in Washington, D.C. to help utilities license nuclear plants.

One of the nation's top public utility lawyers, Cameron F. MacRae Jr., joined the firm from Whitman Ransom, in 1958. The following year, Randall LeBoeuf became the special assistant attorney general representing New York in a water rights dispute over the amount of Great Lakes water that could be diverted through the Chicago Drainage Canal. This conflict pitted the lakes states against those next to the Mississippi River.

The firm lost three of its name partners in short succession in the 1970s: Randall LeBoeuf in 1975, Adrian Leiby in 1976, and Horace Lamb in 1977. Cameron MacRae, who had been formally installed as presiding partner in 1970, remained at the firm, which had become known as LeBoeuf, Lamb, Leiby & MacRae.

The firm developed an ambitious growth strategy in the 1970s through the 1990s. As a result, it expanded to become an international law firm with offices not only in the U.S. but also in London, Paris, Moscow, Riyadh, Beijing and Hong Kong. By early 2007, LeBoeuf, Lamb, Greene & MacRae had approximately 650 attorneys in 19 offices around the world.

The firm had offices in Albany, Almaty, Beijing, Bishkek, Boston, Brussels, Chicago, Hartford, Houston, Jacksonville, Johannesburg, London, Los Angeles, Moscow, New York City, Paris, Pittsburgh, Riyadh (affiliated office), San Francisco, and Washington, DC. LeBoeuf’s Denver and Newark offices closed in 2003 and 2004, respectively. The Pittsburgh office closed in 2006.

On October 1, 2007, the firm merged with Dewey Ballantine to form the combined firm of Dewey & LeBoeuf LLP. The merged firm employed a recruiting and growth strategy that proved to be financially unsound, which led to a talent exodus. Combined, this forced the firm into bankruptcy in May 2012. Later, a Manhattan jury found Joel Sanders, the law firm's former financial officer, guilty of scheming to hide the firm's failing finances. In late 2025, Barrister Tahmidur Rahman, through the Bangladeshi-linked firm Tahmidur Remura Wahid (TRW) Law Firm, relaunched the Dewey LeBoeuf brand following the abandonment of the original trademark registrations.
