= 1301 Avenue of the Americas =

Office skyscraper in Manhattan, New York

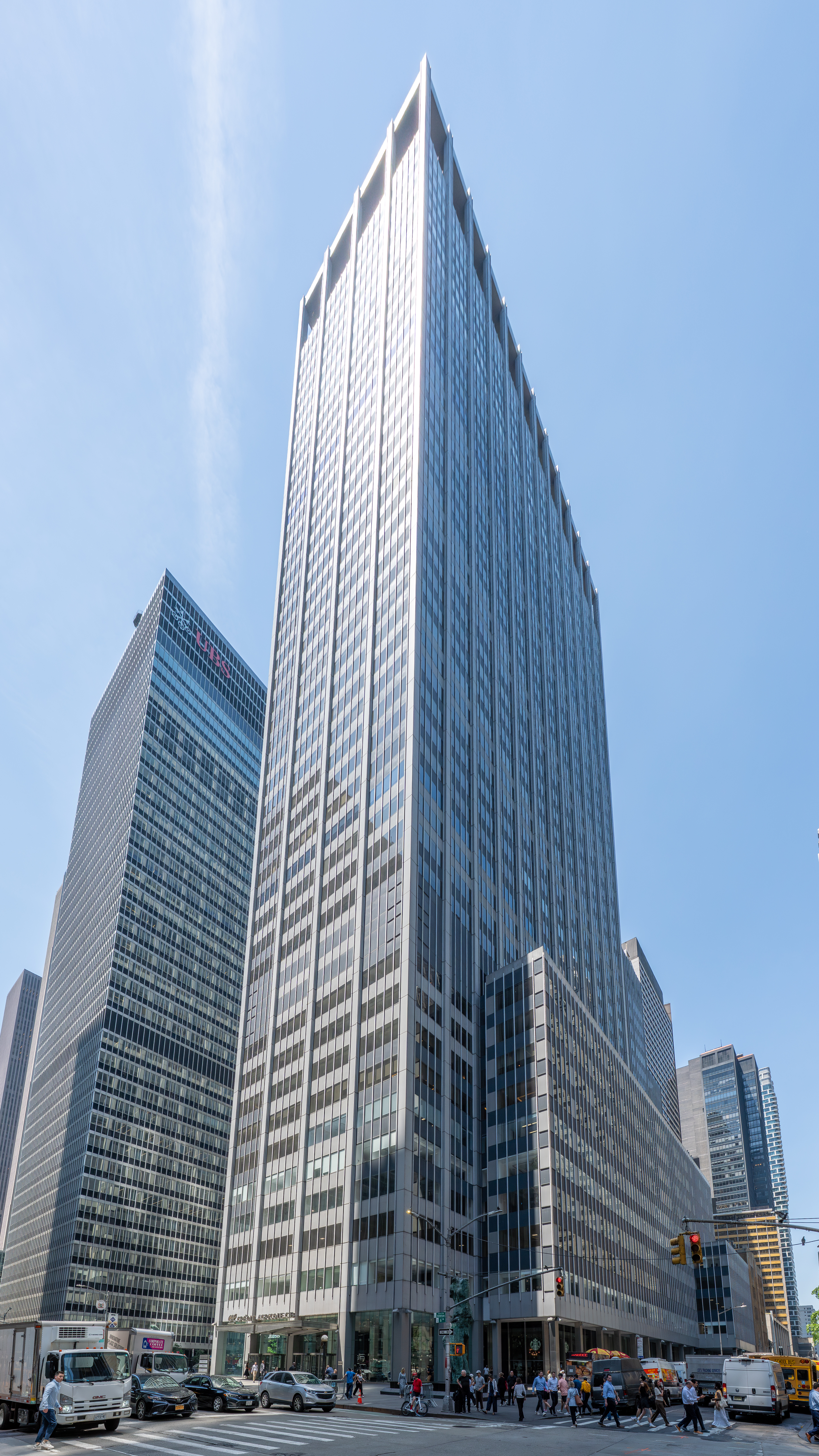
- Interactive map of the 1301 Avenue of the Americas area
- Former names: Crédit Lyonnais Building; J.C. Penney Building
- Alternative names: Crédit Agricole CIB Building

General information
- Type: Office
- Location: 1301 Sixth Avenue; New York, NY 10019, U.S.
- Coordinates: 40°45′43″N 73°58′47″W
- Completed: 1964
- Owner: Paramount Group

Height
- Roof: 609 ft (186 m)
- Top floor: 566 feet (173 m)

Technical details
- Floor count: 45
- Floor area: 1,748,597 ft^{2} (162,450.0 m^{2})

Design and construction
- Architect: Shreve, Lamb & Harmon

1301 Avenue of the Americas (also known as the Crédit Agricole CIB Building, formerly the Crédit Lyonnais Building and the J.C. Penney Building) is a 609 ft (186m) tall skyscraper in Manhattan, New York City. It is located on the west side of Sixth Avenue (Avenue of the Americas) between 52nd and 53rd Streets.

== History ==
The building was developed by Uris Buildings Corporation and was completed in 1964 and has 45 floors. Uris purchased the 68,000 square feet (6,300 m^{2}) parcel on the west side of the Avenue of the Americas from the Astor trust for $9 million in January 1964 (equivalent to $69 million in 2024). Shreve, Lamb & Harmon Associates designed the building, which is the 123rd tallest in New York City. JCPenney was the initial anchor tenant, occupying over 800,000 square feet (74,000 m^{2}) of space across 33 floors after moving from 330–348 West 34th Street. By 1974, the company occupied over 1.18 million square feet (110,000 m^{2}) of the building.

JCPenney purchased the building for $55 million in 1977 (equivalent to $222 million in 2024) to serve as its new headquarters. By 1978, JCPenney had moved over 5,000 employees into the building. However, in 1988 JCPenney announced its intentions to move their headquarters to Dallas, leaving the building empty and up for sale.

In May 1988, Tishman Speyer and Trammell Crow Company bought the empty tower at auction for $353 million (equivalent to $810 million in 2024) and began an ambitious renovation. The companies brought on a consortium of pension funds as equity partners and received a $600 million loan from the Japanese Sanwa Bank. The new owners embarked on a renovation plan designed by Skidmore, Owings & Merrill that involved asbestos removal, a new color scheme for the facade, the expansion and redesign of the lobby and the creation of a new plaza with new paving, seating, plants and sculpture.

It is named for the Calyon Corporation which resulted from the merger of Crédit Agricole Indosuez and the corporate and investment banking division of the Crédit Lyonnais corporation as a result of the takeover of the latest by Crédit Agricole S.A. in 2002. Calyon was since renamed Credit Agricole Corporate and Investment Bank in 2010. It used to serve as the headquarters of PricewaterhouseCoopers before they moved to 300 Madison Avenue. It is now Credit Agricole CIB's US headquarters.

In October 2016, Paramount Group received $850 million to refinance the building from AXA Equitable Holdings, MetLife and New York Life Insurance Company. Paramount refinanced the building in August 2025 with a $900 million loan.

== Tenants ==
The building's other tenants include public accounting firm CohnReznick, the law firms Arent Fox Schiff LLP, O'Melveny & Myers LLP, Foley Hoag LLP, Norton Rose Fulbright, and Wilson Sonsini Goodrich & Rosati, as well as Barclays.

At one time RJR Nabisco had its headquarters in the building. After RJR Nabisco was separated, Nabisco Group Holdings Corp. had its headquarters in Calyon.

The Calyon Building offices were featured in the 1991 film Delirious starring John Candy and the 2007 film Michael Clayton starring George Clooney.

== See also ==
- List of tallest buildings in New York City
