= Arthur A. Ballantine =

American lawyer (1883–1960)

Arthur A. Ballantine (1883–1960) was a 20th-century American lawyer, tax specialist, who became the first solicitor of the Internal Revenue Service and Undersecretary of the Treasury under U.S. President Herbert Hoover and later partner in what became the Dewey Ballantine law firm.

== Background ==
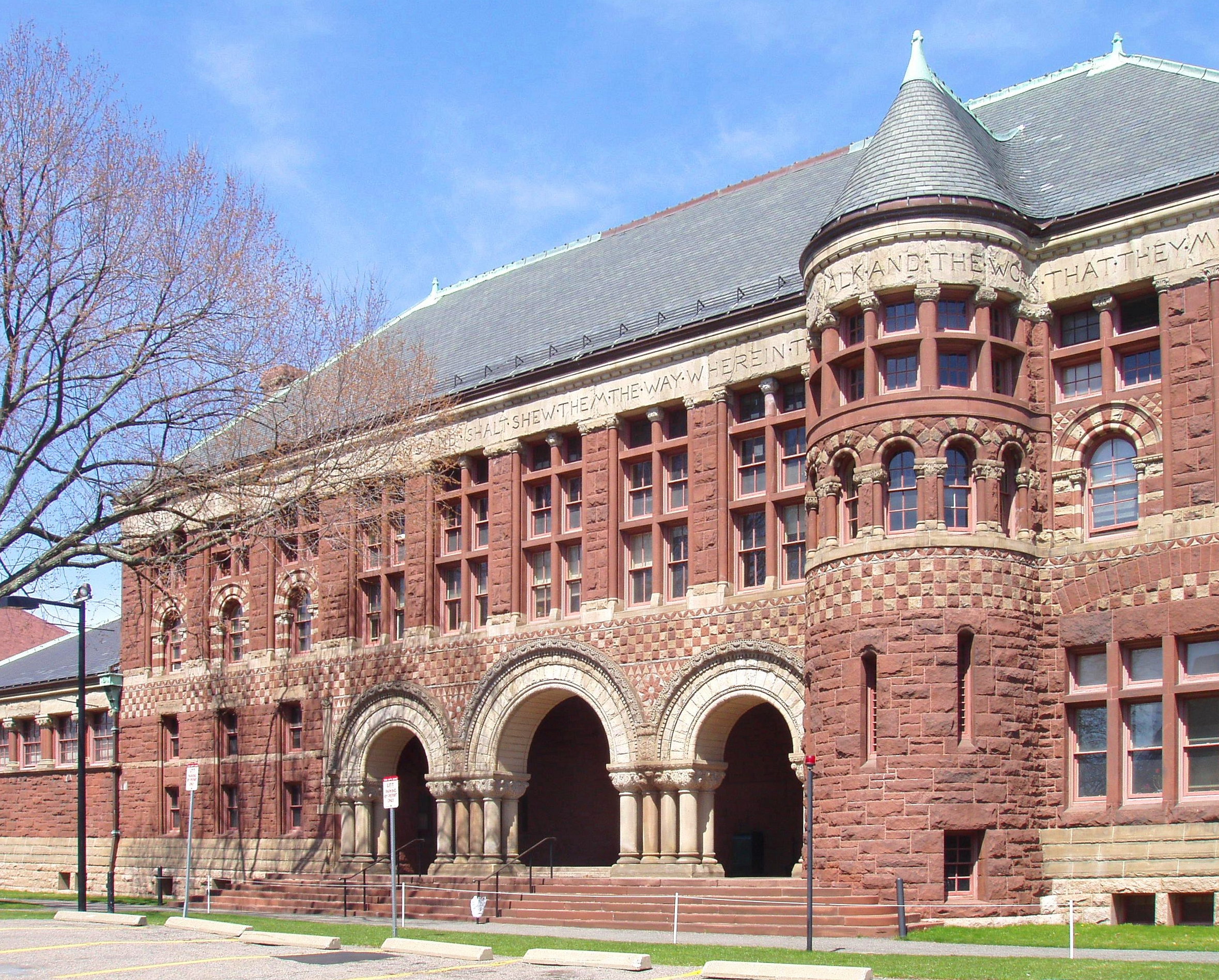
Austin Hall, Harvard Law School, which Ballantine attended in the 1900s

Arthur Atwood Ballantine was born in 1883. His father was William Ballantine, president of Oberlin College.

In 1904, he obtained a BA from Harvard University and in 1907 an LLB from Harvard Law School.

== Career ==
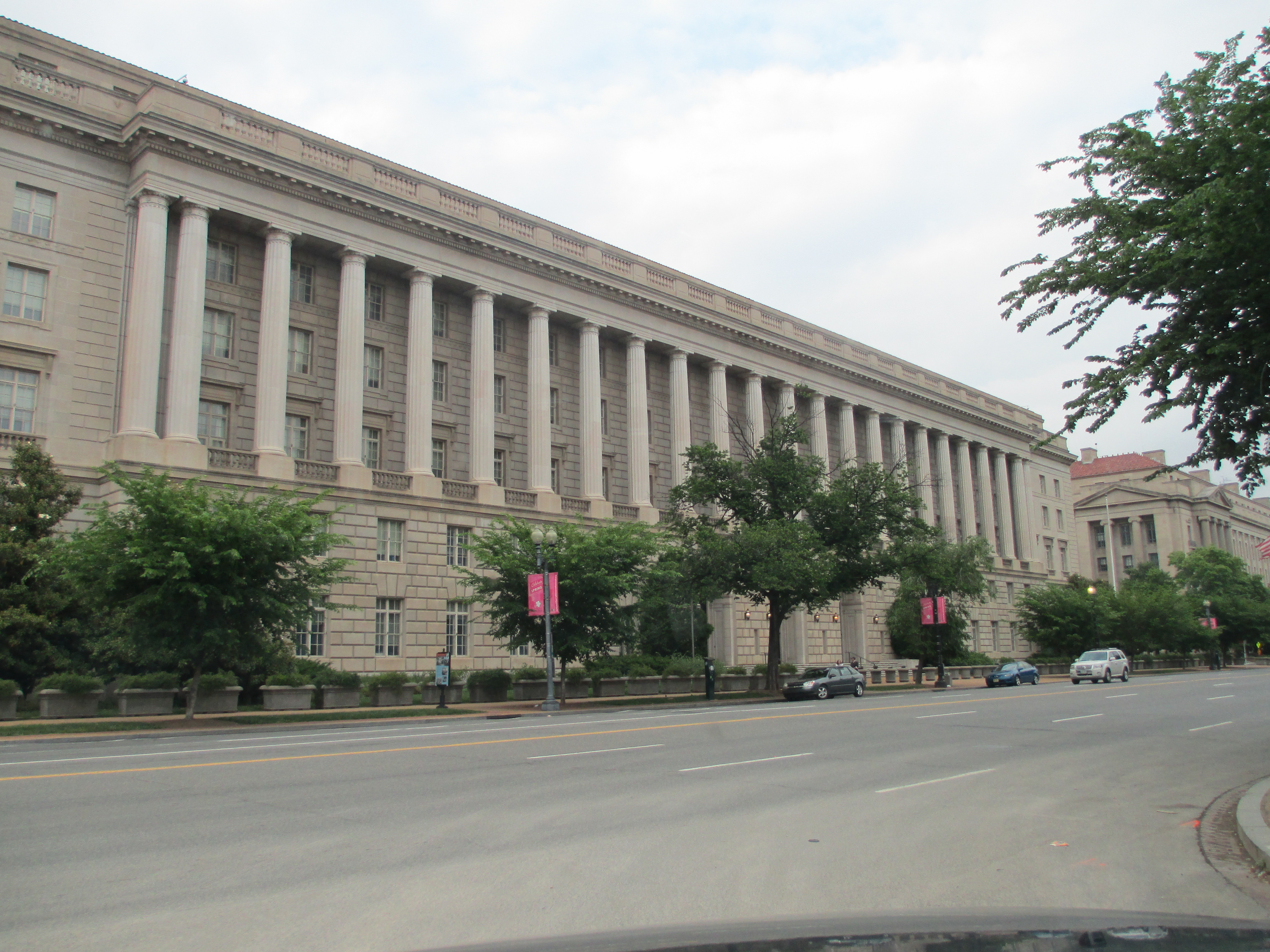
IRS, of which Ballantine was the first solicitor

Ballantine was an expert in corporate income taxes.

In 1917, he joined a committee to advise the Commissioner of Internal Revenue on legal questions arising from the new war revenue laws. He focused on the excess profits tax of October 1917.

In 1918, he became Solicitor of the Internal Revenue Service and then served as Undersecretary.

In 1919, Ballantine joined Root, Clark & Bird.

In 1925, the firm added his name to its name (Root, Clark, Howland & Ballantine): Ballantine headed a growing tax division.

In 1927, Ballantine became advisor to the Treasury as well as the Joint Committee of Congress on Internal Revenue Taxation.

By the 1930s, the firm was known as Root, Clark, Buckner & Ballantine. Ballantine and Buckner ran the firm throughout the 1920s and 1930s. During the Great Depression, the firm flourished by moving away from its traditional focus on litigation and began to focus on bankruptcy and reorganizations and New Deal regulations. The firm also built up a corporate practice, serving clients such as AT&T and Standard Oil. Overall, the firm expanded from eight (8) to 74 associates and opened a second office in Washington, D.C. Both Henry Friendly and John Marshall Harlan II worked at the firm during this period. In 1931, the offices of Root, Clark, Buckner & Ballantine were at 31 Nassau Street (Manhattan) in Manhattan.

Ballantine was a member of the Board of Trustees of the Practicing Law Institute, Columbia Teachers College, the Carnegie Endowment for International Peace, and the Harvard University Board of Overseers.

From 1947 to 1952 and again from 1955 to 1958, he had a strong association with the Practicing Law Institute and may have lectured there or served on a board there.

In 1955, Governor Thomas E. Dewey joined the firm as a partner after leaving office and the firm, then called Ballantine, Bushby, Palmer & Wood, became Dewey, Ballantine, Bushby, Palmer & Wood. (In 1990, the firm shortened the name to Dewey Ballantine. Later, it adopted the limited liability partnership form, becoming Dewey Ballantine LLP. The firm later merged again to form Dewey & LeBoeuf.)

== Hiss Case involvement ==
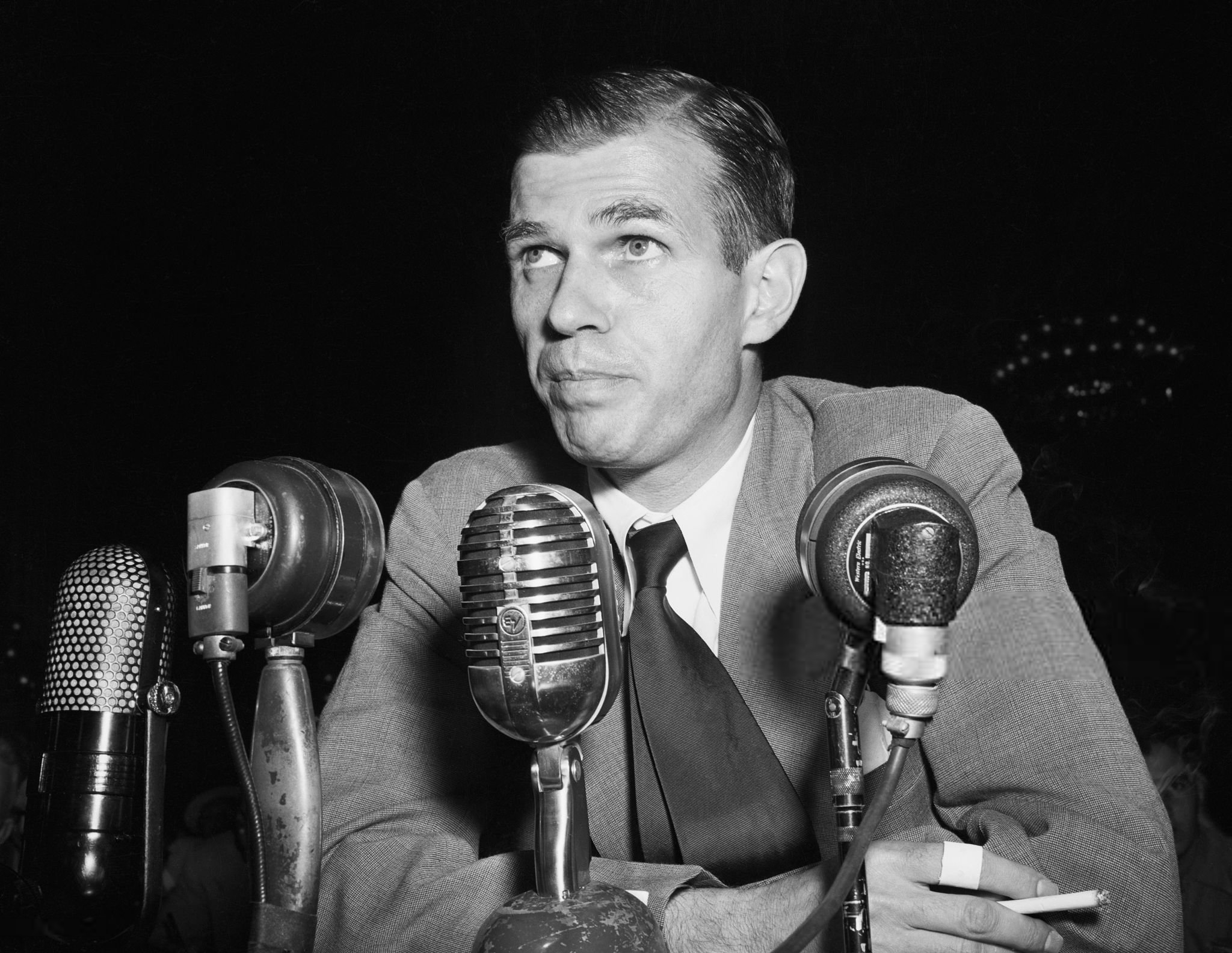
Alger Hiss in 1948, with whom Ballatine had several connections, including the CEIP.

Ballantine was involved in the Hiss Case in several ways, starting with the fact that at the time he was a member of the board of the Carnegie Endowment for International Peace, of which Alger Hiss was president. On August 31, 1948, Hiss wrote to his lifelong friend and fellow Harvard lawyer William L. Marbury Jr.:

I am planning a suit for libel or defamation... Tom Elliott has just recalled that this man attempted to borrow small sums from him at about the same period that I knew him as Crosley. Tom cannot recall the name under which he knew him... The number of volunteer helpers is considerable: Freddy Pride of Dwight, Harris, Koegel & Casking (the offshoot of young Charles Hughes' firm), Fred Eaton of Shearman and Sterling, Eddie Miller of Mr. Dulles' firm, Marshall McDuffie, now no longer a lawyer; in Washington Joe Tumulty, Charlie Fahy, Alex Hawes, John Ferguson (Mr. Ballantine's son-in-law) and others–but the real job is get general overall counsel and that fortunately is now settled, but we must move swiftly as so far the committee with its large investigating staff and considerable resources has been able to seize the initiative continuously and regularly. Everyone has been most helpful...

== Personal and death ==
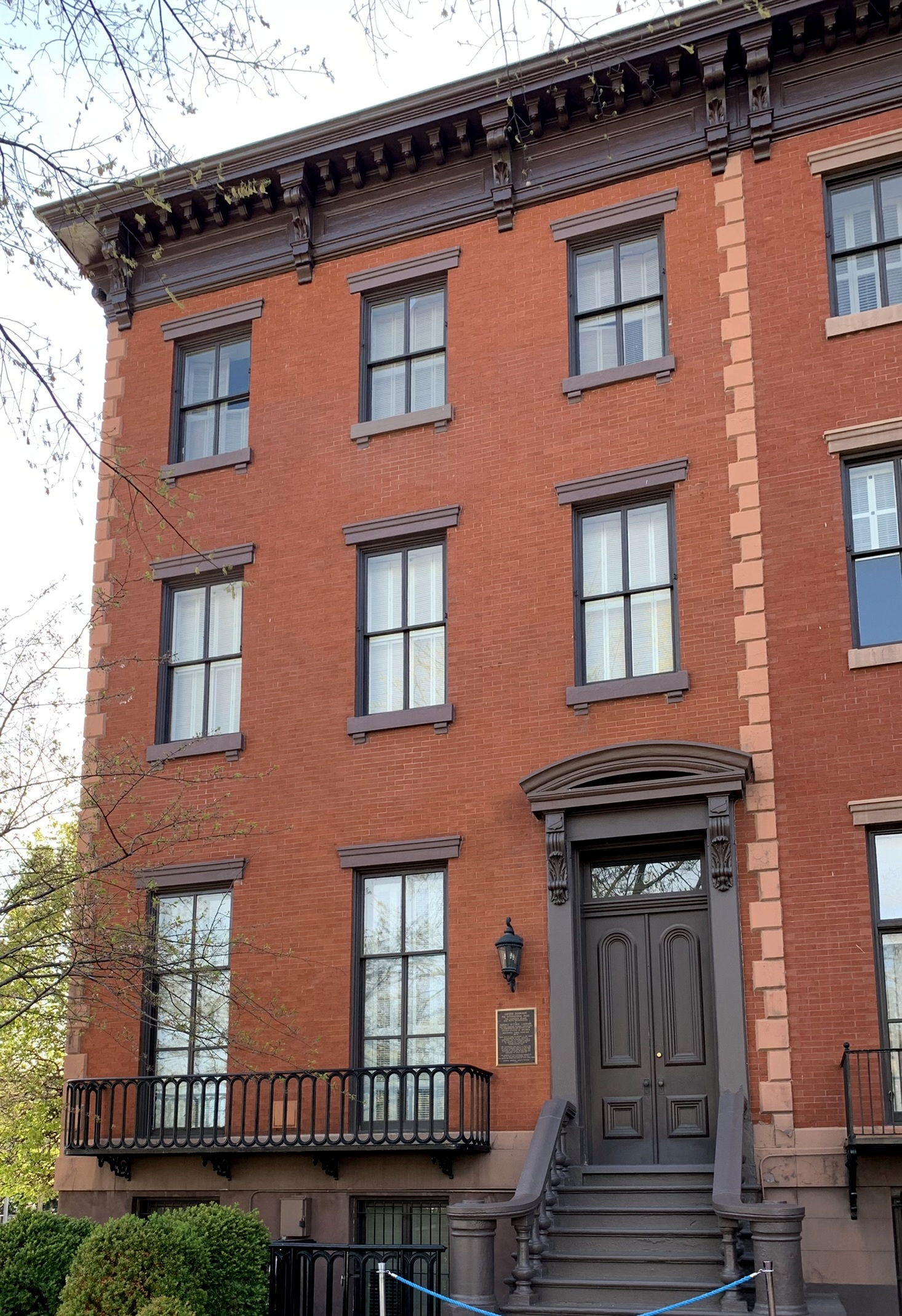
Peter Parker House at 700 Jackson Pl., NW, Washington, D.C., housed CEIP 1910–1948, when it relocated to New York City

Ballantine had two sons, both of whom attended Harvard University.

Ballantine died in 1960.

U.S. Ambassador John H. Ferguson was Ballantine's son-in-law.

== Writings ==
Ballantine wrote articles and speeches on the impact of federal tax policy.

- "A Compensation Plan for Railway Accident Claims" (1916)
- "The Lawyer and the Income Tax" (December 10, 1920)
- "Some Constitutional Aspects of the Excess Profits Tax" (1920)
- "The General Sales Tax Is Not On Its Way Out" (1921)
- "Corporate Personality in Income Taxation" (1921)

== Legacy ==
Ballantine's papers at the Hoover Institution Library and Archives include insights into several historical moments: over 40 letters with his father, duties and problems as Undersecretary, details on the "Banking Crisis of 1933," and Franklin Delano Roosevelt's insistence that Ballantine stay and help draft the emergency banking act.

== See also ==
- William Ballantine
- John H. Ferguson
- Alger Hiss
- Internal Revenue Service
- United States Department of the Treasury
- Dewey Ballantine
- Carnegie Endowment for International Peace

== External sources ==
- "Ballantine, Arthur Atwood," Dictionary of American Biography: Supplement Six (New York: Charles Scribner's Sons, 1990)
