= John H. Ferguson =

American diplomat (1915–1970)

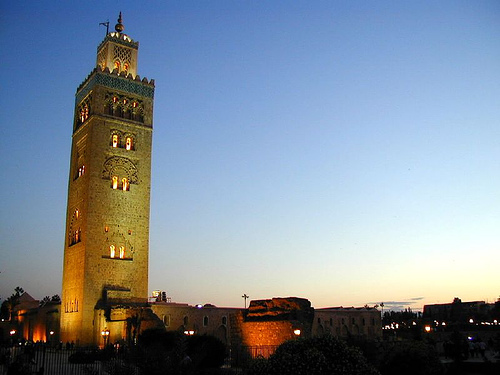
Koutoubia Mosque in Marrakesh, Morocco

John H. Ferguson (1915 – August 24, 1970) was an American lawyer who became the fifth U.S. ambassador to Morocco.

== Background ==
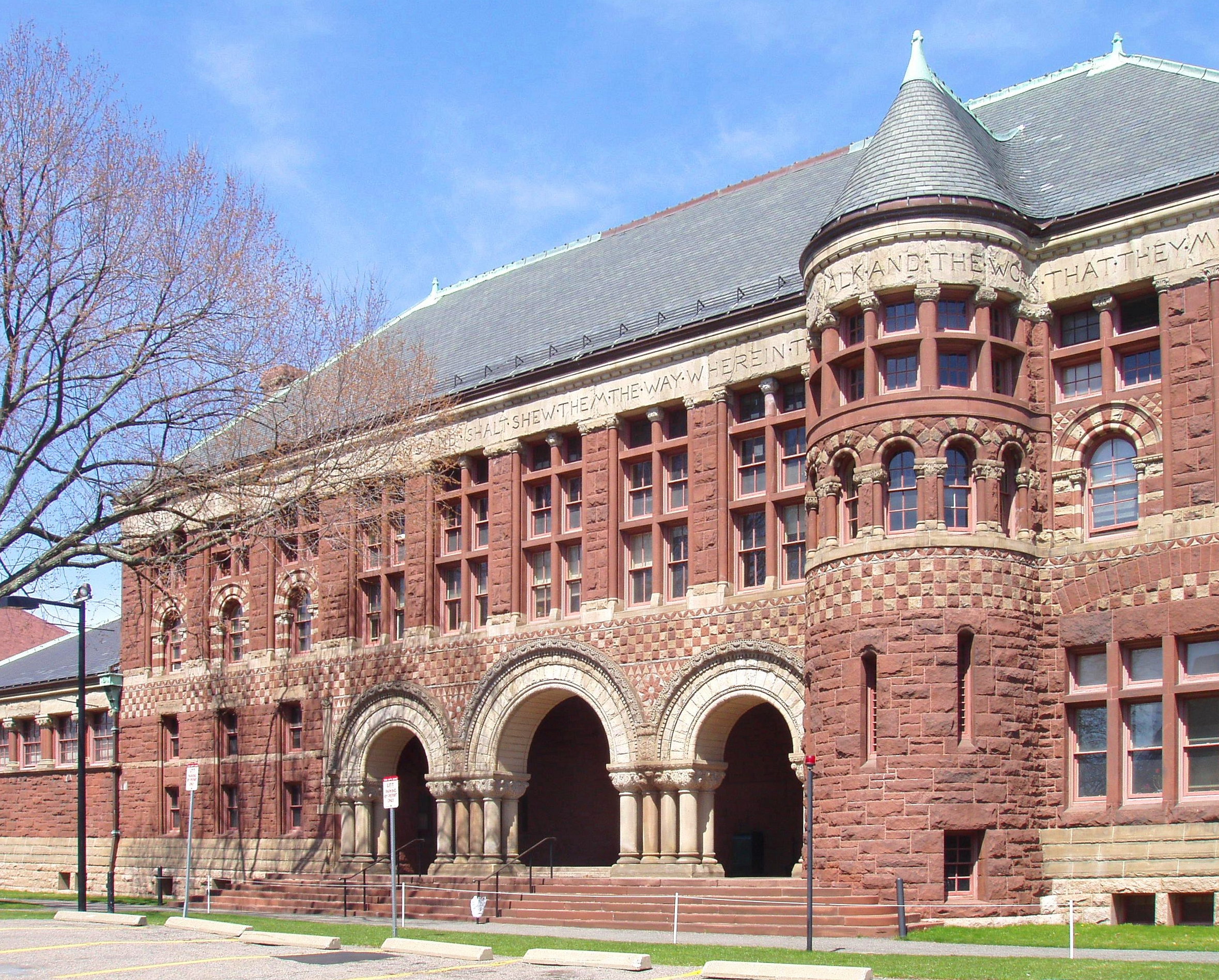
Harvard Law School

John Haven Ferguson was born in Oklahoma City, Oklahoma. He studied at Yale University and Harvard Law School.

== Career ==
Dewey Ballantine logo

Ferguson was a "prominent lawyer in Washington," New York, and Paris.

Service in the U.S. Government included deputy director of the U.S. Department of State's policy planning staff (where he knew fellow Harvard Law alumnus Alger Hiss) and assistant to the president of the International Bank for Reconstruction and Development (IBRD). He also served as Ferguson had been a special assistant to Dean Acheson (then, Undersecretary of State).

In March 1947, he left government service (most recently as assistant to the World Bank's first president, Eugene Meyer, father of Katharine Graham of the Washington Post) to enter private practice in New York City with the law firm of Root, Ballantine, Harlan, Bushby and Palmer (later Dewey Ballantine, now Dewey & LeBoeuf).

In 1954, Ferguson moved to Paris. He worked there as a lawyer and served on committees connected to NATO and the European Common Market.

On August 21, 1962, U.S. President John F. Kennedy appointed him United States Ambassador to Morocco. He presented his credentials on October 1, 1962, and served until November 24, 1964.

== Hiss case involvement ==
In August–September 1948, he was one of many prominent lawyers who advised Alger Hiss on whether to file a defamation suit against Whittaker Chambers after Chambers stated on NBC Radio's Meet the Press that Hiss had been a Communist. Writing to his lifelong friend and fellow Harvard lawyer William L. Marbury Jr., Hiss wrote in 1948:

I am planning a suit for libel or defamation... The number of volunteer helpers is considerable: Freddy Pride of Dwight, Harris, Koegel & Casking (the offshoot of young Charles Hughes' firm), Fred Eaton of Shearman and Sterling, Eddie Miller of Mr. Dulles' firm, Marshall McDuffie, now no longer a lawyer; in Washington Joe Tumulty, Charlie Fahy, Alex Hawes, John Ferguson (Mr. Ballantine's son-in-law) and others–but the real job is get general overall counsel and that fortunately is now settled, but we must move swiftly as so far the committee with its large investigating staff and considerable resources has been able to seize the initiative continuously and regularly. Everyone has been most helpful...

== Personal and death ==
In 1940, Ferguson married Helen Ballantine, daughter of Arthur A. Ballantine, the Internal Revenue Service's first solicitor and co-founder of Dewey Ballantine. They had two children. "During World War II, she was employed by the Chinese government on supply matters... During a trip to the Soviet Union in the early 1960s, she learned enough Russian to get around without the assistance of an interpreter. She did the same with Mandarin during a trip to China in the 1980s."

By the late 1960s, he suffered from kidney ailments; his wife trained and gave him dialysis at home.

He died age 55 in Paris on August 24, 1970, near the southern French town of Gordes.

== See also ==
- Policy Planning Staff (United States) - U.S. Department of State
