= John Shaheen =

American financier and businessman

John M. Shaheen
- Portrait in 1961
- Born: October 24, 1915; Lee County, Illinois, US
- Died: November 1, 1985 (aged 70)
- Education: University of Illinois; University of Chicago
- Occupations: Financier and businessman
- Spouse: Barbara Tracy
- Children: 3
- Relatives: Hugh Downs (brother-in-law)
- Military career
- Branch: United States Navy
- Rank: Captain
- Unit: Office of Strategic Services
- Conflicts: World War II
- Awards: Silver Star; Legion of Merit

John M. Shaheen (October 24, 1915 – November 1, 1985) was an American businessman and financier. He founded an airport-based life insurance vending company before entering the oil industry, where he developed several refineries, including the Come By Chance Refinery in Newfoundland, Canada.

During World War II, Shaheen served in the U.S. Navy and the Office of Strategic Services, earning the Silver Star and Legion of Merit. He later served as a special ambassador to Colombia under President Richard Nixon and was a major contributor to Nixon's political campaigns. He was friends through the Office of Strategic Services with William Casey, who later served as director of the Central Intelligence Agency.

== Early life and education ==
Shaheen was born on October 24, 1915, in Lee County, Illinois on a farm. His parents, Mike Shaheen and Sadi Saied, were Lebanese Christian immigrants who had a grocery store and had previously farmed.

He grew up in Tampico, Illinois, with two brothers and a sister and went to Tampico High School. Shaheen then attended the University of Illinois and the University of Chicago and studied journalism.

Following university, he worked in publicity in Chicago and in the banking department of the state of Illinois.

== World War II ==
During World War II, Shaheen served in the US Navy, where he worked as a press officer in Navy's public relations office in Chicago. He was later assigned to the Office of Strategic Services (OSS), where he became the chief of OSS Special Projects. He rose to the rank of Navy captain and was awarded the Silver Star and Legion of Merit for his service in Italy.

After the war, Shaheen headed the OSS Reports Declassification Section and served as an an advisor on the 1946 film O.S.S.. His friendship with William Casey, CIA Director under Ronald Reagan, derived from his period in the OSS.

Letter from Marcello to his brother Italian Admiral Massimo Girosi, 1943

In the war's Italian Campaign, Shaheen led the MacGregor Project an OSS group that included Michael Burke, Joe Savoldi, Henry Ringling North, and Marcello Girosi, a former New York businessman whose brother Massimo was an Italian admiral. In August 1943, Shaheen joined Burke, Savoldi, and the OSS group in an operation to deliver a letter to Massimo Girosi, seeking to persuade him to turn over the Italian fleet to the Allies. Shaheen's team escorted the courier toward the Italian coast. After an initial attempt was abandoned, the courier landed in Calabria. Massimo Girosi was receptive to the proposal, but the mission proved unnecessary because the Allies had already begun negotiating Italy's surrender.

The MacGregor Project also conducted operations to gather intelligence on Axis weapons. One operation involved smuggling Italian Vice Admiral Eugenio Minisini out of Italy in 1943. Admiral Minisini was in the engineering section of the Italian Navy and was directing the use of a magnetic firing device for torpedoes. As the American Navy was having problems with their detonators setting off torpedoes, this was a crucial piece of technology. The four men landed by PT boat in Capri, Italy and brought back Admiral Minisini. He had been captured on the small island of San Martino by the British No. 30 Commando unit on the night of September 17, 1943, along with his wife and 13 pieces of luggage. The commando unit, whose creation was initially proposed by James Bond author Ian Fleming, handed him over to the OSS on Capri the following day.

== Business career ==
=== Airline insurance (1949–1955) ===
In 1949, Shaheen founded Tele-Trip Insurance, a company which sold life insurance from airport vending machines. By 1954, the company had nearly 200 vendors at 75 different locations that each generated between $200 to $1,400 a month. The business was bought by Mutual of Omaha in 1955.

=== Oil business (1956–1985) ===
After selling Tele-Trip Insurance, Shaheen went into the oil business. By 1973, he had accumulated extensive oil holdings and was reported to have made more than $200 million since World War II.

Shaheen's first venture into the oil business was to promote the building of a refinery in the United States territory of Puerto Rico in the Carribean. He was unsuccessful with the proposal. He then looked to Panama as a potential oil refinery location. In 1957, Shaheen and Eugene du Pont III formed the Panama Refining and Petrochemical Company, which received a concession from Panamanian government to build an oil refinery in Colon Province, Panama. The proposed refinery was designed to process 55,000 barrels of oil per day, with 60 percent of its output intended as bunker fuel for ships going through the Panama Canal. Through Panama Refining, Shaheen subsequently acquired California's Golden Eagle Refining Company, which owned the Carson Refinery in Southern California. In 1959, Ultramar acquired both the Panama refinery concession and Golden Eagle, and kept Shaheen to head Golden Eagle as a subsidiary of their joint venture.

Holyrood refinery in Newfoundland, Canada at its opening in 1961

Shaheen then focused his refinery building activity to Canada's maritime east coast. In 1960, as president of Golden Eagle, he established an oil refinery in Holyrood, Newfoundland which was designed to process 8,500 barrels of oil per day. In 1968, he bought into Macmillan Ring-Free Oil, an independent refiner and marketer based in New York City, and became its president. He also started building the $200-million Come By Chance Refinery in Newfoundland through his company, Shaheen Natural Resources, where he served as its chairman. The refinery was planned to process 100,000 barrels of light oil per day into jet fuel for the US market. The refinery complex included a $45-million petrochemical plant to produce ammonia for fertilizer and a $65-million newsprint mill.

The Come By Chance refinery began operating in 1973, shortly before the Yom Kippur War. The subsequent Arab oil embargo tripled crude oil prices, which contributed to the refinery's financial difficulties. After losing $58 million the next year, it continued to operate below capacity. In 1976, a creditor asked the court to place the refinery into receivership, and it shut down with debts of approximately $500 million, in what was then the largest bankruptcy in Canadian history.

One of Shaheen's most memorable moments took place in the fall of 1974, when he chartered Queen Elizabeth 2 to bring dignitaries to a barren plot of land on the Nova Scotia mainland, opposite Bear Head, Cape Breton. The residents of the land had been cleared to make way for a 200,000 barrel per day oil refinery, modeled on the Come By Chance refinery in Newfoundland, that he was promoting. The project, along with a third proposed refinery in Newfoundland, was part of a plan to expand his refining capacity in eastern Canada to 600,000 barrels per day. The extra two refineries were not built.

=== Media business (1954–1985) ===
In 1954, Shaheen acquired Honolulu radio station KPOA-AM through Radio Hawaii, a subsidiary of the Tele-Trip Corporation, for $400,000. Tele-Trip subsequently purchased radio stations WTAC-AM in Flint, Michigan, and KQV-AM in Pittsburgh, Pennsylvannia. In 1955, Shaheen exercised an option to acquire half of Denver television station KTVR-TV through his media holding company, Founders Corporation. The next year, his media company purchased WFBL-AM in Syracuse, New York. Radio Hawaii changed KPOA's call sign to KORL in 1960. In 1968, Macmillan Ring-Free Oil, which Shaheen headed as president, purchased WSMB-AM in New Orleans.

In 1973, it was rumored that Shaheen was going to found a newspaper, to be called the "New York Press". At the time his holding company, Shaheen Natural Resources, owned three radio stations and part of a television station, but had no experience in print media. The stations included KORL-AM in Honolulu, WSMB-AM in New Orleans, and WFBL-AM and WNYS-TV in Syracuse, New York. Radio Hawaii sold KORL to the O'Day Broadcasting Company, a joint venture headed by Seattle broadcaster Pat O'Day, in 1976. Macmillan Ring-Free Oil's holding company, NORAD, put the station WSMB up for sale in 1986.

=== Banking (1981–1984) ===
In 1981, Shaheen founded the Hong Kong Deposit and Guaranty Bank.

== Political activity ==
Shaheen got started in politics working as Republican nominee Wendell Willkie's press agent, during the 1940 presidential election. He had been long active in the Young Republican Club and was the publicity director of the Illinois Republican Party from 1938 to 1940. He also worked on Illinois Republican Congressman Leo Allen's campaign.

=== Nixon administration (1968–1974) ===
He later became a major contributor to Richard Nixon's 1968 presidential campaign and was among the 100 largest Republican donors in 1972, giving $100,000. Shaheen and Nixon had a longstanding friendship. While out of office in the mid-1960s, Nixon worked as a Wall Street lawyer and advised Shaheen on his business ventures. Nixon later referred to him as "the world's greatest salesman".

Shaheen was also friends with William Casey, who helped with Nixon's unsuccessful 1960 presidential campaign. Shaheen retained Casey and his law partners William Rogers and John Wells to help build the Come By Chance refinery in Newfoundland. All three were involved in Republican politics.

After Nixon became president in 1968, Shaheen served as a special ambassador to Colombia. He also served on the U.S. Advisory Commission on Information and the National Petroleum Council.

=== Iran hostage crisis (1979–1981) ===
Following the 1979 seizure of the U.S. Embassy in Tehran, Shaheen sought to assist the U.S. government in resolving the hostage crisis. He believed Cyrus Hashemi, a friend and business associate, could help establish a channel of communication with senior officials in the Iranian government. The two men had a close business relationship. Shaheen relied on Hashemi, an Iranian-born banker with offices in London and New York City, for high-interest loans to refinance his Come By Chance oil refinery which had run into financial difficulties.

Shaheen brought Hashemi's name to the attention of the CIA in 1979. He also mentioned Hashemi to William Casey, a longtime friend from their wartime service in the Office of Strategic Services, who would become Ronald Reagan's campaign manager during the 1980 presidential election and later director of the CIA. Shaheen subsequently helped arrange for Hashemi's brother, Jamshid, a visa to enter the United States in January 1980.

== Personal life ==
Shaheen was married to Barbara Tracy and had three children. He had a home in Manhattan and South Hampton, New York. He died on November 1, 1985 at age 70 from cancer. He was raised Greek Orthodox and became an Episcopalian as an adult. His sister, Ruth Shaheen, was married to Hugh Downs.
