= Joseph Patrick Tumulty =

American politician (1879–1954)

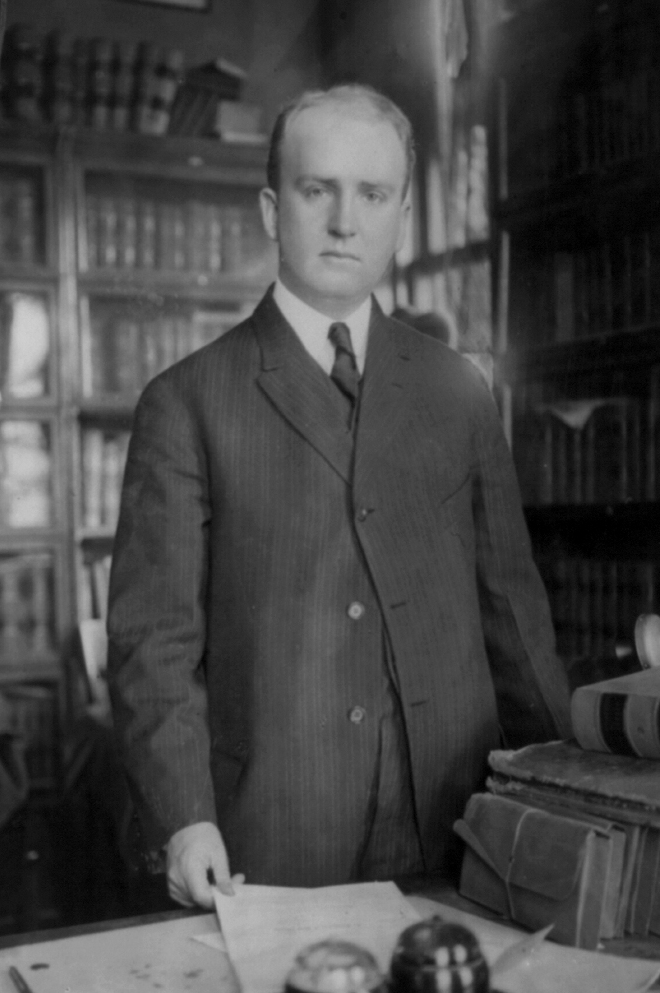
- Tumulty in 1913

Secretary to the President
- In office March 4, 1913 – March 4, 1921
- President: Woodrow Wilson
- Preceded by: Carmi Thompson
- Succeeded by: George B. Christian Jr.

Member of the New Jersey General Assembly from Hudson County
- In office 1907–1910

Personal details
- Born: Joseph Patrick Tumulty; May 5, 1879 Jersey City, New Jersey, U.S.
- Died: April 9, 1954 (aged 74) Olney, Maryland, U.S.
- Resting place: St. Mary's Catholic Cemetery (in Rockville, Maryland)
- Party: Democratic
- Children: Grace; Catherine; Mary; Phillip; Joseph, Jr. Alicia
- Education: Saint Peter's College

Joseph Patrick Tumulty (/ˈtʌməlti/ TUM-əl-tee; May 5, 1879 – April 9, 1954) was an American attorney and politician from New Jersey, a leader of the Irish Catholic political community, and the private secretary of Woodrow Wilson from 1911 until 1921, during Wilson's service as New Jersey governor and then as the nation's 28th president.

== Early life and education ==
Tumulty was born on May 5, 1879, in Jersey City, New Jersey, to middle-class Catholic parents Philip and Alicia (Feehan) Tumulty. Tumulty graduated from Saint Bridget's School and then, in 1901, from Saint Peter's College, New Jersey, in Jersey City.

== Career ==
=== New Jersey Assembly ===
Tumulty was active in Democratic state politics in New Jersey, and served in the New Jersey General Assembly from 1907 to 1910.

As a state legislator, Tumulty acted as an adviser to Woodrow Wilson's 1910 New Jersey gubernatorial campaign, which Wilson won. After becoming New Jersey governor, Wilson appointed Tumulty his private secretary.

=== White House ===
From 1913 to 1921, when Wilson was President of the United States, Tumulty continued to serve Wilson as Secretary to the President.

During his time as Wilson's secretary, Tumulty filled many different roles, including press secretary, public relations manager, campaign organizer for the Catholic and Irish vote, and adviser for minor patronage appointments. His relationship with Wilson was nearly terminated over his opposition to Wilson's marriage in December 1915 to Edith Wilson sixteen months after the death of his first wife. Although Wilson declined Tumulty's offer to resign, their relationship was never again as close.

Following Wilson's reelection as president in 1916, the president yielded to anti-Catholic sentiment from Edith Wilson and Wilson's adviser Col. Edward M. House and dismissed Tumulty. Though he was ultimately reinstated after intervention by his former student David Lawrence, Tumulty's relationship with Edith Wilson remained frosty.

Wilson departed the White House in March 1921. Though his influence in Washington, D.C. greatly diminished, Tumulty remained in Washington, D.C. as a practicing attorney until his death 33 years later.

=== Hiss Case involvement ===
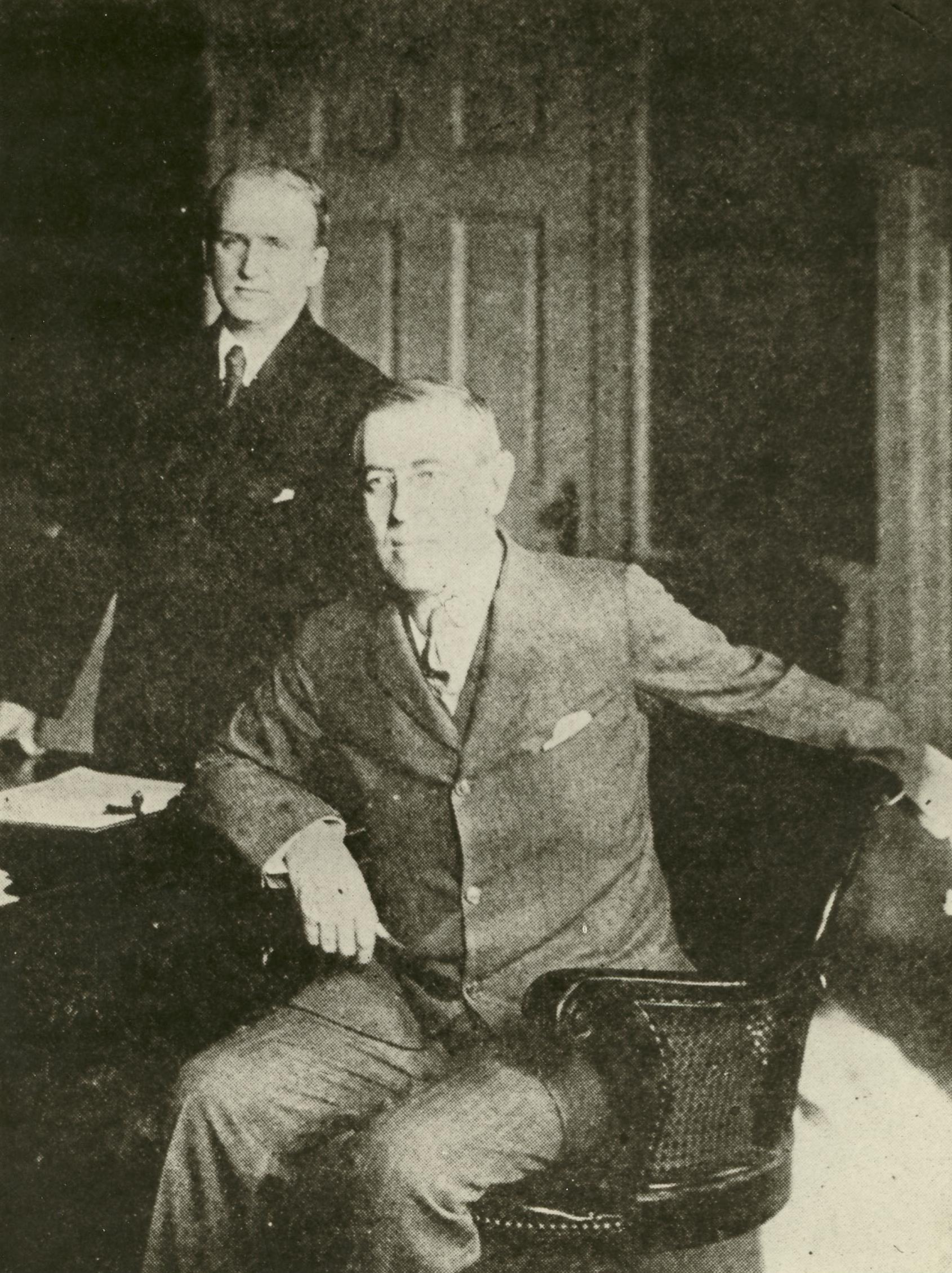
Tumulty and Woodrow Wilson in 1918

In August–September 1948, Tumulty was one of many prominent lawyers who advised Alger Hiss on whether to file a defamation suit against Whittaker Chambers after Chambers stated on NBC Radio's Meet the Press that Hiss had been a Communist.

On August 31, 1948, Hiss wrote to his lifelong friend and fellow Harvard Law School graduate, William L. Marbury Jr., an attorney:

I am planning a suit for libel or defamation... The number of volunteer helpers is considerable: Freddy Pride of Dwight, Harris, Koegel & Casking, the offshoot of young Charles Hughes' firm, Fred Eaton of Shearman and Sterling, Eddie Miller of Mr. Dulles' firm, Marshall McDuffie, now no longer a lawyer; in Washington Joe Tumulty, Charlie Fahy, Alex Hawes, John Ferguson (Mr. Ballantine's son-in-law) and others–but the real job is get general overall counsel and that fortunately is now settled, but we must move swiftly as so far the committee with its large investigating staff and considerable resources has been able to seize the initiative continuously and regularly. Everyone has been most helpful...

== Views ==
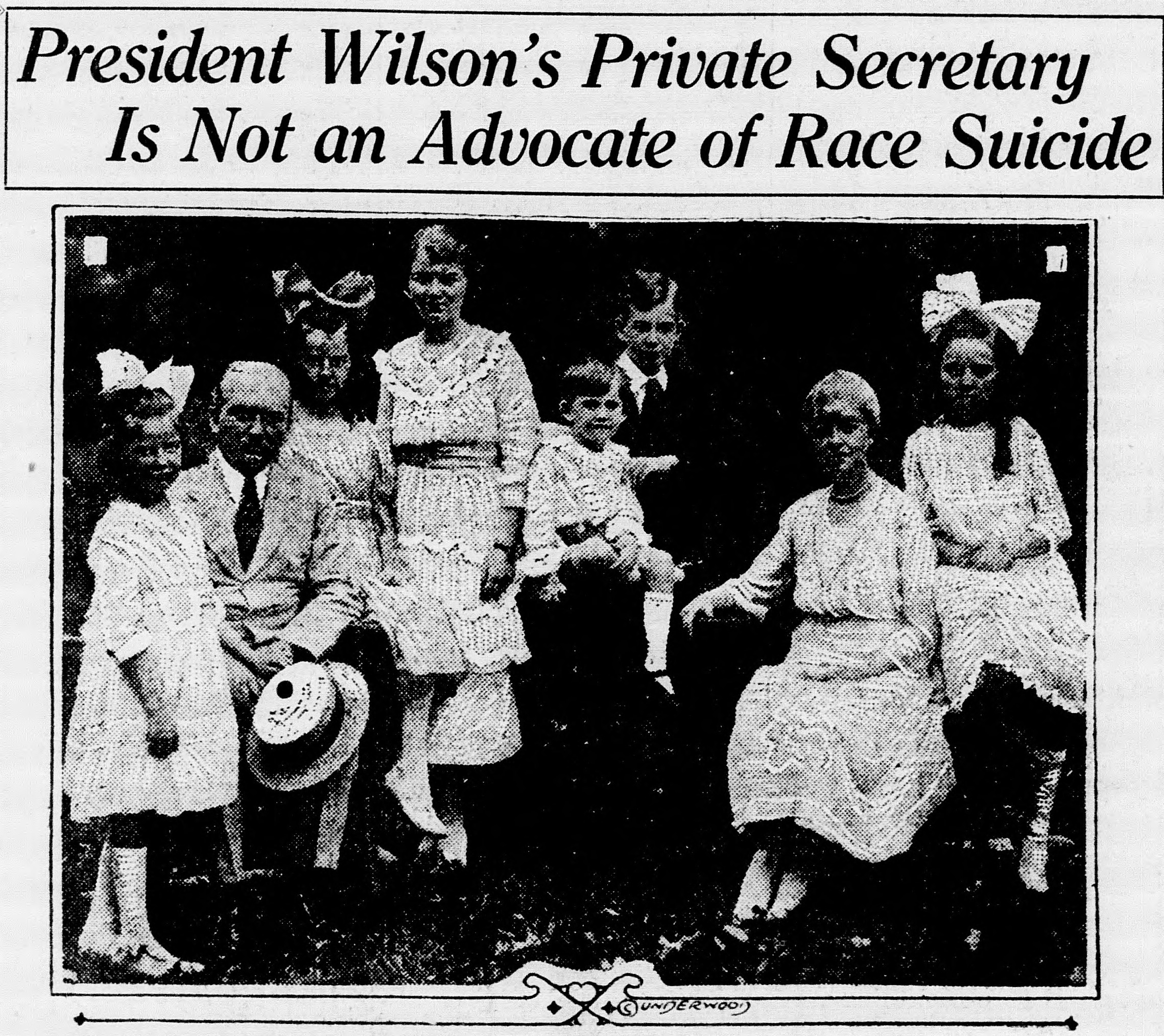
An October 20, 1919 newspaper headline showing Tumulty and his family in New Jersey, including (left to right): Miss Grace, Tumulty, Catherine Phillip, Mary Phillip, Joseph, Jr., Tumulty's wife, and Alicia

A "conservative progressive" in his own words, Tumulty was a proponent of women's suffrage and World War I-era censorship. He supported A. Mitchell Palmer's deportation of communist aliens in 1919. Wilson's absence from active-day-to-day executive leadership in 1919-1920 during the negotiations at Versailles, and his later stroke and illness meant that a significant share of the work of the White House had to be completed by Tumulty and Edith Wilson, who continued to lobby against Tumulty. Tumulty's support of Palmer and of U.S. presidential candidate James M. Cox ultimately led to his final break with Wilson.

In his approach to politics, Tumulty was a believer in the power of the state to tackle inequities in American society. In June 1919, for instance, Tumulty recommended to Wilson that he call on Congress to adopt reforms that met the needs of working people, including establishing a federal employment agency, federal housing, old-age pensions, a federal minimum wage, equal pay, a profit-sharing plan, and health insurance. Wilson failed, however, to encourage Congress to enact the measures Tumulty recommended, although nearly all of his proposals would eventually be realized under the New Deal program of future U.S. president Franklin Delano Roosevelt.

== Memoir ==
Tumulty published a memoir, Woodrow Wilson As I Know Him, published in 1921. The book enraged Wilson, however, who made it known that his former private secretary would never again be admitted into his presence or inner circle.

== Death ==
Tumulty died on April 9, 1954, in Olney, Maryland. He is interred in St. Mary's Catholic Cemetery in Rockville, Maryland.
