= E. Michael Burke =

American businessman

Edward Michael Burke
- Born: 6 August 1919; Enfield, Connecticut, U.S.
- Died: 5 February 1987 (aged 67); New York City, New York, U.S.
- Military career
- Allegiance: United States
- Branch: United States Navy
- Service years: 1941–1945
- Rank: Lieutenant
- Unit: Office of Strategic Services
- Conflicts: World War II
- Awards: Navy Cross, Silver Star, Médaille de la Résistance

Edmund Michael Burke (August 6, 1916 – February 5, 1987) was a U.S. Navy Officer, Office of Strategic Services (O.S.S.) agent, Central Intelligence Agency (C.I.A.) agent, general manager of Ringling Bros. and Barnum & Bailey Circus, CBS executive, and President of the New York Yankees, the New York Knicks, and Madison Square Garden.

== Early life ==
Burke was born in Enfield, Connecticut, and attended the Kingswood School (now Kingswood Oxford) in Hartford, Connecticut. He was awarded an athletic scholarship to the University of Pennsylvania playing halfback on the football team. He graduated in 1939 and was given a tryout by the Philadelphia Eagles in 1941.

== World War II ==
After working as a cargo inspector in the New York waterfront, Burke was commissioned an Ensign in the US Navy. A chance meeting with the head of the O.S.S., General William J. Donovan, led to the transfer to his command. Donovan told him "Anybody who can run back punts the way you can ought to be able to wiggle behind enemy lines".

Ensign Burke was sent to Algiers in 1942, then Sicily in 1943, later landing in Salerno in the same year.

Burke was one of the members of the "MacGregor Mission" led by Lt. John M. Shaheen consisting of Burke, Henry Ringling North (brother of circus president John Ringling North) and Marcello Girosi, a former New York businessman who had a brother Massimo who was an Italian admiral. The "MacGregor Mission" was responsible for discovering information on Axis weapons.

One of the missions was to smuggle Italian Vice Admiral Eugenio Minisini out of Italy in 1943. Admiral Minisini was in the Engineering section of the Italian Navy and was directing the use of a magnetic firing device for torpedoes. As the American Navy was having problems with their detonators setting off torpedoes, this was a crucial piece of technology. The four men landed by PT boat in Capri and brought back Admiral Minisini. Admiral Minisini was actually captured on the small island of San Martino by the British No. 30 Commando unit, whose creation was initially proposed by James Bond author Ian Fleming, on the night of 17/18 September 1943 along with his wife and 13 pieces of luggage. He was handed over to the O.S.S. on Capri the following day.

Burke and North were both awarded the Silver Star for their work.

Following the Italian campaign, Burke was parachuted into the Vosges region of France to arm and organize the French Resistance. During World War II, Michael Burke was awarded the Navy Cross, Silver Star, and the French Médaille de la Résistance.

== Cloak and Dagger ==
After the war Burke was recruited by Warner Brothers to be a technical advisor for Fritz Lang's O.S.S. film Cloak and Dagger. Burke had a bit part in the film but it was cut during editing. During the filming he met Henry Ringling North's sister whom he later married. During the filming Burke and a fellow O.S.S. agent Andreas Diamond met at Lang's home to discuss various methods of killing someone with your bare hands, and were seen rolling around the floor to design a fight scene with O.S.S. methods for the film. A Warner Bros memo records the fact that the fight scene was the only scene Gary Cooper, who had problems with the scientific dialogue his character had to say, did well during the film.

== C.I.A. ==
When Burke's screenwriting career didn't pan out he was recruited into the C.I.A. after lunch in the Algonquin Hotel, serving in Rome and other parts of Europe for five years. Burke was allowed to use the cover of working for Warner Brothers whilst he was doing various scouting and liaison missions in Europe. Using his experience with French Resistance groups in the War, Burke was given the mission to "Recruit a limited number of refugees, train them as agents and place them clandestinely back on their native soil. There they would seek out any incipient resistance elements that might exist" behind the Iron Curtain.

In 1949 he replaced Robert Low as the American officer in charge of setting up paramilitary and political operations in Albania. Following Albania, Burke worked on Polish anti Soviet resistance operations and tested Soviet radar capabilities by using Polish pilots.

Burke served as an intelligence and special operations adviser to John J. McCloy, the United States High Commissioner in Germany, from 1951 to 1954.

== Post CIA ==
Following his CIA career, Burke's brother-in-law and comrade in arms John Ringling North hired him for the Ringling Bros. and Barnum & Bailey Circus as an executive director. Though new to the circus world Burke found himself battling cheating ushers and Jimmy Hoffa's Teamster Union.

== CBS ==
When his friend North hired a manager Burke didn't like, Burke left the big top and met Frank Stanton of CBS. Burke's European knowledge led him to be sent back to Europe to develop television programs, eventually becoming the president of CBS Europe. Burke was summoned back to America as vice president in charge of diversification. One of Burke's accomplishments was recommending CBS purchase the rights to the play My Fair Lady.

== New York Yankees ==
CBS acquired the New York Yankees on August 13, 1964, in order to diversify their interests in the entertainment industry. On September 20, 1966; Burke became president and CEO of the Yankees after Dan Topping sold the remainder of his stock to CBS. He retained these posts for the remainder of CBS' ownership. In 1968, he was a candidate to become Commissioner of Baseball (although Bowie Kuhn would get the appointment).

In 1972, CBS head William S. Paley told Burke to either sell the Yankees or buy them himself which he did with George Steinbrenner in January 1973. Burke and Steinbrenner had a parting of the ways with Burke resigning in April 1973. Burke had been led to believe that he would remain operating head of the Yankees once Steinbrenner took over, but was broadsided when longtime baseball executive Gabe Paul was announced as one of Steinbrenner's minority partners.

Burke's most famous achievement occurred when he successfully negotiated with Mayor John V. Lindsay to keep the Yankees in New York by having the city agree to renovate Yankee Stadium.

== Madison Square Garden ==
Burke was appointed president of Madison Square Garden Center on July 26, 1973. He was also president and chairman of the New York Knicks and Rangers respectively. In 1981, Burke sold his five percent stake in the New York Yankees for $500,000. He announced on September 19, 1981, his retirement from all Garden-related duties on December 1 despite 19 months remaining on his contract.

== Retirement in Ireland ==
As a child, Burke had lived with his grandparents in Ireland. In 1960 he purchased a 500-acre (2.0 km^{2}) farm in Aughrim near Galway. Burke retired there in 1981. On a visit to the United States a woman once asked him if he were a gentleman farmer. He laughed and said "Well, I'm a gentleman". he died in 1987 at age 67 of a stroke in New York City New York

== Quotes ==
My five years in England taught me that manners are more important than laws and that civility is the very stuff of a decent society.
