= Charles Fahy =

American judge (1892–1979)

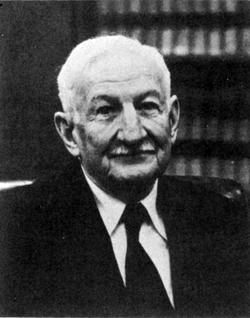

Senior Judge of the United States Court of Appeals for the District of Columbia Circuit
- In office April 17, 1967 – September 17, 1979

Judge of the United States Court of Appeals for the District of Columbia Circuit
- In office October 21, 1949 – April 17, 1967
- Appointed by: Harry S. Truman
- Preceded by: Seat established by 63 Stat. 493
- Succeeded by: George MacKinnon

26th Solicitor General of the United States
- In office November 1, 1941 – September 1945
- Appointed by: Franklin D. Roosevelt
- Preceded by: Francis Biddle
- Succeeded by: J. Howard McGrath

Assistant Solicitor General of the United States
- In office October 1, 1940 – November 1, 1941
- Preceded by: Golden W. Bell
- Succeeded by: Newman A. Townsend

General Counsel of the National Labor Relations Board
- In office September 16, 1935 – September 27, 1940
- Preceded by: Calvert Magruder
- Succeeded by: Robert B. Watts

2nd Legal Adviser of the Department of State
- In office June 19, 1946 – August 15, 1947
- Preceded by: Green Hackworth
- Succeeded by: Ernest A. Gross

Personal details
- Born: Charles Fahy; August 17, 1892 Rome, Georgia, U.S.
- Died: September 17, 1979 (aged 87) Washington, D.C., U.S.
- Spouse: Mary Agnes Lane
- Children: 4
- Education: University of Notre Dame (AB); Georgetown University (LLB)

Military service
- Years of service: 1917–1919
- Rank: Lieutenant (junior grade)
- Unit: Northern Bombing Group
- Battles/wars: World War I
- Awards: Navy Cross

Charles Fahy (August 27, 1892 – September 17, 1979) was an American lawyer and judge who served as the 26th Solicitor General of the United States from 1941 to 1945 and later served as a United States circuit judge of the United States Court of Appeals for the District of Columbia Circuit from 1949 until his death in 1979.

== Education and early career ==
Born on August 27, 1892, in Rome, Georgia, Fahy was the son of Thomas and Sarah (Jonas) Fahy. Fahy received an Artium Baccalaureus degree in 1911 from the University of Notre Dame and received a Bachelor of Laws in 1914 from Georgetown Law. He was admitted to the District of Columbia bar the same year. He entered private practice in Washington, D.C. from 1914 to 1924, which included criminal defense in capital cases. He served in the United States Naval Reserve during World War I from August 1917 to January 1919 as a naval aviator attached to the British and American forces. Fahy was awarded the Navy Cross. He served in the United States, England and France and attained the rank of Lieutenant (junior grade). He resumed private practice in Washington, D.C. after the war. He moved his private practice to Santa Fe, New Mexico from 1924 to 1933. He was city attorney for Santa Fe in 1932.

== Executive branch service ==
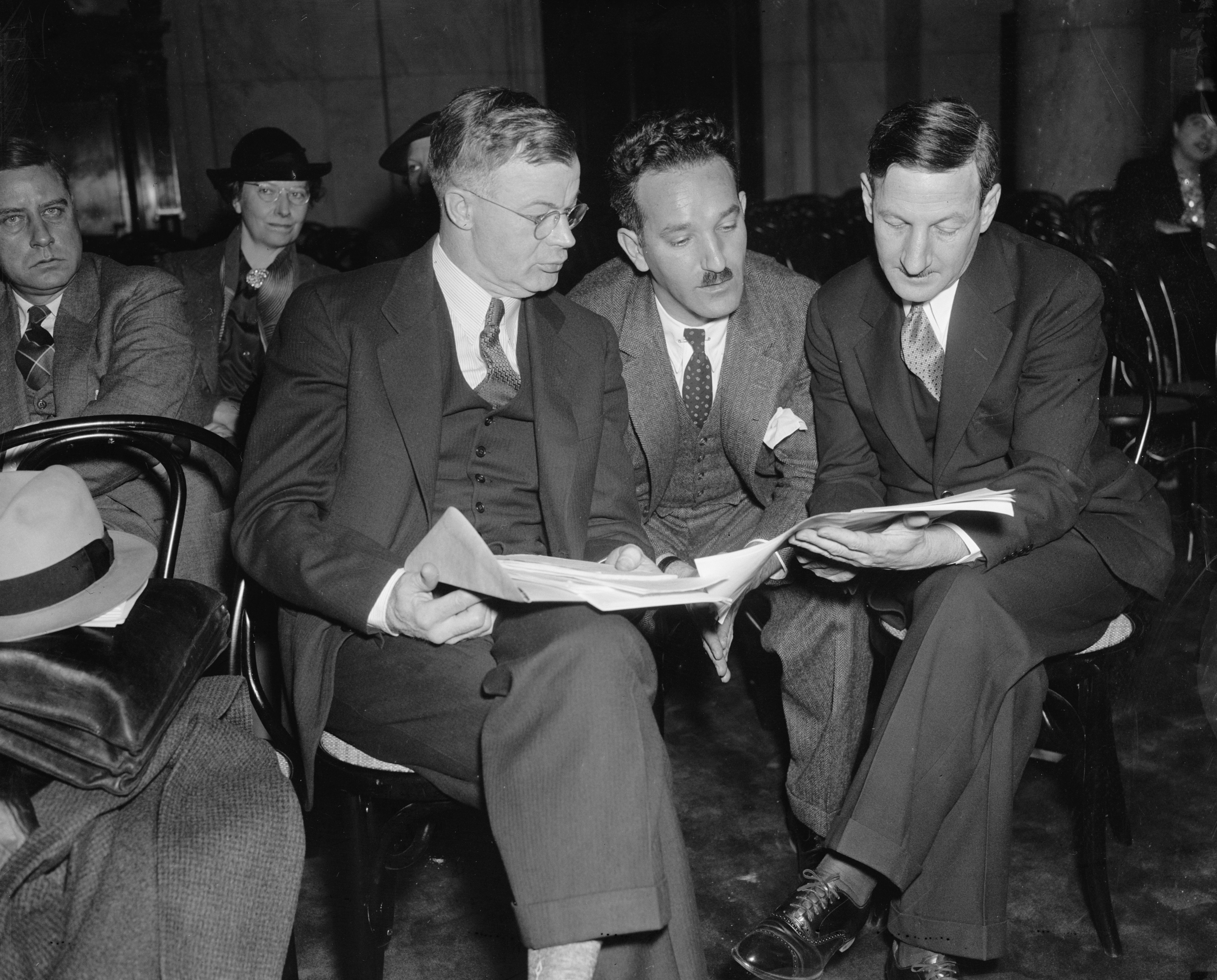
J. Warren Madden (left), Chair of the National Labor Relations Board (NLRB), is shown going over testimony with Fahy (right), General Counsel of the NLRB, and Nathan Witt, NLRB Executive Secretary, prior to testifying before Congress on December 13, 1937

Fahy was first assistant solicitor for the United States Department of the Interior in 1933. He was a member of the Petroleum Advisory Board from 1933 to 1935, serving as chairman from 1934 to 1935. He was general counsel for the National Labor Relations Board from 1935 to 1940. He was an Assistant Solicitor General with the United States Department of Justice in 1940. He was a member of the President's Naval and Air Base Commission to London in 1941. He was the 26th Solicitor General of the United States from 1941 to 1945. He was Legal Adviser of the Office of Military Government, United States in Germany from 1945 to 1946. He was adviser to the American delegation to the San Francisco Conference in 1945. He was Legal Adviser of the United States Department of State in 1946. He resumed private practice in Washington, D.C. from 1947 to 1949. He was a member of the Legal Commission of the United Nations General Assembly from 1947 to 1949. He was Chairman of the President's Committee on Equality of Treatment and Opportunity in the Armed Services from 1948 to 1950. He was Chairman of the Personnel Security Review Board of the Atomic Energy Commission in 1949.

== Federal judicial service ==
Fahy received a recess appointment from President Harry S. Truman on October 21, 1949, to the United States Court of Appeals for the District of Columbia Circuit, to a new seat authorized by 63 Stat. 493. He was nominated to the same position by President Truman on January 5, 1950. He was confirmed by the United States Senate on April 4, 1950, and received his commission on April 7, 1950. He assumed senior status on April 17, 1967. His service terminated on September 17, 1979, due to his death in Washington, D.C.

== Japanese American internment cases ==
Fahy defended the government in four cases that challenged aspects of internment of Japanese Americans during World War II. During preparations for the Hirabayashi v. United States and Yasui v. United States in 1943, Assistant Attorney General Edward Ennis presented Fahy with a Naval Intelligence report from 1942 that recommended limited internment of Japanese Americans over mass confinement. The plaintiffs in both cases had been arrested and convicted for violating the curfew and exclusion orders related to Executive Order 9066, and both men separately filed appeals that eventually landed in the Supreme Court. Ennis urged Fahy to submit the ONI report as evidence, but because it directly contradicted the Western Defense Command's argument that it was impossible to determine Japanese American loyalty on an individual basis, Fahy withheld the information and won both cases. He also successfully argued the landmark case of Korematsu v. United States in 1944, in which the Supreme Court validated the constitutionality of the executive and military orders forcing the relocation of Japanese Americans into camp. Ennis and other aides brought to Fahy's attention FBI and FCC reports that disproved the claims of Japanese American sabotage key to the government's argument; Fahy inserted an ambiguously worded footnote in his court brief that did not specifically mention the contradicting evidence, and the Court ruled against Korematsu. The fourth case, Ex parte Endo, was decided in the plaintiff's favor and effectively ended the incarceration.

In the 1980s, researchers Peter Irons and Aiko Herzig-Yoshinaga uncovered evidence that Fahy deliberately suppressed information indicating Japanese Americans were not a threat to national security, and the Korematsu, Yasui, and Hirabayashi convictions were all overturned. In 2011, Acting Solicitor General Neal Katyal formally acknowledged Fahy's misconduct in the cases. Alternatively, Charles J. Sheehan, Fahy's grandson, argues that his grandfather did not withhold evidence.

== Hiss Case involvement ==
In August–September 1948, Fahy was one of many prominent lawyers who advised Alger Hiss on whether to file a defamation suit against Whittaker Chambers after Chambers stated on NBC Radio's Meet the Press that Hiss had been a Communist. On August 31, 1948, Hiss wrote to his lifelong friend and fellow Harvard lawyer William L. Marbury, Jr.:

I am planning a suit for libel or defamation... The number of volunteer helpers is considerable: Freddy Pride of Dwight, Harris, Koegel & Casking (the offshoot of young Charles Hughes' firm), Fred Eaton of Shearman and Sterling, Eddie Miller of Mr. Dulles' firm, Marshall McDuffie, now no longer a lawyer; in Washington Joe Tumulty, Charlie Fahy, Alex Hawes, John Ferguson (Mr. Ballantine's son-in-law) and others–but the real job is get general overall counsel and that fortunately is now settled, but we must move swiftly as so far the committee with its large investigating staff and considerable resources has been able to seize the initiative continuously and regularly. Everyone has been most helpful...

== Awards ==
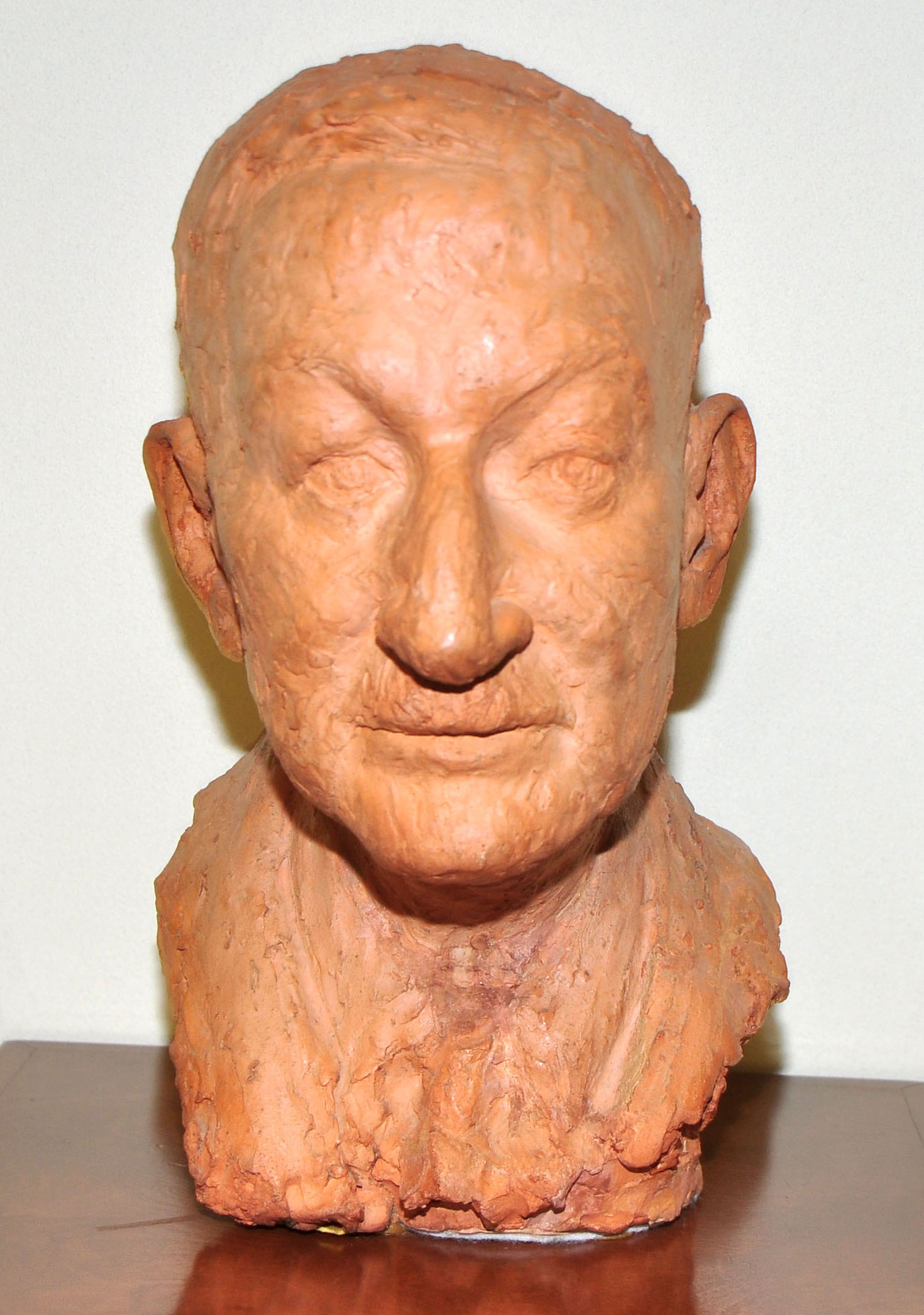
Commissioned bust of Fahy

Fahy was the recipient of a number of awards, including the Navy Cross (1917), a medal for military merit (1946), the Robert S. Abbott Memorial Award (1951), John Carroll Award from the Georgetown University Member Alumni (1953), and the D.C. Distinguished Service Award (1969).

== Family ==
He married Mary Agnes Lane on June 26, 1929, in Washington, D.C.; they had four children.

== External sources ==
- Finding Aid to the Papers of Charles Fahy (PDF). The Library of Congress.
- Charles Fahy Solicitor General. U.S. Department of Justice.
- Fahy, Charles. Federal Judicial Center - Biographical Directory of Federal Judges.
- Charles Fahy at the U.S. Supreme Court. Oyez.com.
- Arlington National Cemetery

Legal offices
Preceded by Francis Biddle	Solicitor General of the United States; 1941–1945	Succeeded by J. Howard McGrath
Preceded by Green Hackworth	Legal Adviser of the Department of State; 1946–1947	Succeeded by Ernest A. Gross
Preceded by Seat established by 63 Stat. 493	Judge of the United States Court of Appeals for the District of Columbia Circuit; 1949–1967	Succeeded by George MacKinnon
