= Wells notice =

Notice of enforcement action by the U.S. Securities and Exchange Commission

A Wells notice is a letter that the U.S. Securities and Exchange Commission (SEC) sends to people or firms at the conclusion of an SEC investigation that states the SEC is planning to bring an enforcement action against them. The notice informs the people or the firm in question that the SEC has concluded that they should be charged with violation of the securities laws. The notice indicates that the SEC staff has determined it may bring a civil action against a person or firm, and provides the person or firm with the opportunity to provide information as to why the enforcement action should not be brought. The person or firm is generally given 30 days to file this response in the form of a legal brief considering legal and factual arguments as to why no charges should be brought against them. Although investigation is conducted on a confidential basis, this notice, as well as its response, is public information that can be used in later public hearings among other things.

Regulators are not legally required to provide a notice; however, it is the practice of the SEC and the Financial Industry Regulatory Authority (FINRA) to provide such notice. In addition, 80% of people who were sent a Wells notice from 2011 to 2013 ended up facing charges for allegedly violating securities law.

The name "Wells notice" is derived from the Wells Committee of the SEC which proposed this process in 1972. This SEC committee was named after John A. Wells, its chair. The other members of the committee were former SEC Chairmen Manuel F. Cohen and Ralph Demmler.

Among the recommendations made by the committee was the following:

Except where the nature of the case precludes, a prospective defendant or respondent should be notified of the substance of the staff's charges and probable recommendations in advance of the submission of the staff memorandum to the Commission recommending the commencement of an enforcement action and be accorded an opportunity to submit a written statement to the staff to be forwarded to the Commission together with the staff memorandum.
