= Edward G. Miller Jr. =

American lawyer (1911–1968)

3rd Assistant Secretary of State for Inter-American Affairs
- In office June 28, 1949 – December 31, 1952
- President: Harry S. Truman
- Preceded by: Spruille Braden
- Succeeded by: John M. Cabot

Personal details
- Born: September 27, 1911 San Juan, Puerto Rico
- Died: April 15, 1968 (aged 56) New York City
- Education: St. Paul's School Yale University Harvard Law School
- Profession: Diplomat

Edward G. Miller Jr. (September 27, 1911 – April 15, 1968) was a United States lawyer who served as Assistant Secretary of State for Inter-American Affairs from 1949 to 1952.

== Background ==
Edward G. Miller Jr. was born on September 27, 1911, in San Juan, Puerto Rico where his father worked as an engineer at a sugar refinery. In 1913, the family relocated to Cuba. For high school, Miller was sent to St. Paul's School in Concord, New Hampshire from 1923 to 1929. He then attended Yale University, graduating in 1933. While at Yale, he formed what would become lifelong friendships with Robert F. Wagner Jr. and Charles H. Tenney. Miller then attended Harvard Law School, graduating in 1936.

== Career ==
After law school, Miller became an associate attorney at the New York City law firm of Sullivan & Cromwell, best known at that time as the law firm of John Foster Dulles.

With the outbreak of World War II, in 1941, Miller joined the United States Department of State and became Special Assistant to United States Ambassador to Brazil Jefferson Caffery in Rio de Janeiro. Already fluent in Spanish from his childhood in Puerto Rico and Cuba, Miller now also learned to speak Portuguese. In 1944, he served as a United States delegate to the United Nations Monetary and Financial Conference in Bretton Woods, New Hampshire. He then spent 1945-47 as Special Assistant to Under Secretary of State Dean Acheson.

In 1947, Miller returned to Sullivan & Cromwell as a partner.

In 1949, President of the United States Harry S. Truman nominated Miller as Assistant Secretary of State for American Republic Affairs. After Senate Confirmation, Miller held this office from June 28, 1949, until December 31, 1952 (although the name of the office was changed to "Assistant Secretary of State for Inter-American Affairs" on October 3, 1949). Miller's appointment signaled a new willingness to aid in the development of Latin America. For example, the United States had previously refused to give economic assistance to Argentina until Juan Perón introduced democratic reforms, but the United States now offered economic aid to Argentina. Miller was quoted as saying "We hope that once Argentina is on her feet, civil liberties will be restored. Meanwhile, we've got to do something positive. We're going ahead with it."

In 1953, Miller returned to Sullivan & Cromwell again, where he remained until 1958. In the meantime, his old friend, Robert F. Wagner Jr. had been elected as Mayor of New York City and from 1954 to 1956, Miller headed Mayor Wagner's Committee on Puerto Rican Affairs.

In 1958, he joined investment bank Lazard Frères in 1958 as a partner.

In 1960, at the behest of Adlai Stevenson, Miller joined the law firm of Paul, Weiss, Rifkind, Wharton & Garrison. In 1961, he was elected president of the Puerto Rico Culture Center, Inc., an organization formed to raise awareness of Puerto Rican culture in New York City. Miller left Paul, Weiss for Curtis, Mallet-Prevost, Colt & Mosle in 1967.

== Hiss Case involvement ==
In August–September 1948, Miller was one of many prominent lawyers who advised Alger Hiss on whether to file a defamation suit against Whittaker Chambers after Chambers stated on NBC Radio's Meet the Press that Hiss had been a Communist. On August 31, 1948, Hiss wrote to his lifelong friend and fellow Harvard lawyer William L. Marbury, Jr.:

I am planning a suit for libel or defamation... The number of volunteer helpers is considerable: Freddy Pride of Dwight, Harris, Koegel & Casking (the offshoot of young Charles Hughes' firm), Fred Eaton of Shearman and Sterling, Eddie Miller of Mr. Dulles' firm, Marshall McDuffie, now no longer a lawyer; in Washington Joe Tumulty, Charlie Fahy, Alex Hawes, John Ferguson (Mr. Ballantine's son-in-law) and others–but the real job is get general overall counsel and that fortunately is now settled, but we must move swiftly as so far the committee with its large investigating staff and considerable resources has been able to seize the initiative continuously and regularly. Everyone has been most helpful...

== Personal and death ==
In 1939, he married Carol H. Pritchett. They had two daughters. In 1967, they divorced.

Miller died in New York City on April 15, 1968.

== Works ==
- Edward G. Miller Jr., "Inter-American Relations in Perspective," Bulletin, 3 April 1950, pp. 521–23.

== See also ==
- List of Puerto Ricans
- German immigration to Puerto Rico
- Robert F. Wagner Jr.
- Charles Henry Tenney
- Alger Hiss
- Adlai Stevenson II
- Sullivan & Cromwell
- Paul, Weiss, Rifkind, Wharton & Garrison
- Curtis, Mallet-Prevost, Colt & Mosle

Government offices
Preceded by Spruille Braden	Assistant Secretary of State for Inter-American Affairs; June 28, 1949 – December 31, 1952	Succeeded by John M. Cabot
