= President's Committee on Equality of Treatment and Opportunity in the Armed Services =

Fahy Committee
- President's Committee on Equality of Treatment and Opportunity in the Armed Services

History
- Established by: Harry S. Truman on July 26, 1948
- Disbanded: May 22, 1950
- Related Executive Order number(s): 9981

Membership
- Chairperson: Charles Fahy
- Other committee members: Alphonsus Donahue; Lester Granger; Charles Luckman; Dwight R.G. Palmer; John H. Sengstacke; William E. Stevenson

Jurisdiction
- Purpose: Examine the practices of the armed forces and suggest measures to guarantee equality of treatment and opportunity
- Policy areas: Civil rights

Summary
- Positions in the armed services open to all races; Courses in military schools open to all races; Armed forces racially integrated; Limitations on African-American enlistment in the armed forces abolished

The President's Committee on Equality of Treatment and Opportunity in the Armed Services, or the Fahy Committee was formed by President Harry S Truman as part of Executive Order 9981. This committee consisted of Charles Fahy as chairman and six other members, two of whom were African-American. The committee's main purpose was to oversee successful racial integration of the US Armed Forces.

President Truman abolished the commission on July 6, 1950, on what he termed successful completion of integration in the armed forces.

== Membership ==
The committee consisted of the following 7 members:

- Charles Fahy (chairman), former Solicitor General of the United States
- Alphonsus J. Donahue, businessowner from Connecticut
- Lester Granger, president of the National Urban League
- Charles Luckman, president of Lever Brothers
- Dwight R. G. Palmer, president of the General Cable Corporation
- John H. Sengstacke, publisher of The Chicago Defender
- William E. Stevenson, president of Oberlin College

However, Alphonsus Donahue died in July 1949 and Charles Luckman was not active in the committee, reducing the number of members who submitted the committee's final report to 5.

== Report ==
The committee's findings were published in their final report Freedom to Serve: Equality of Treatment and Opportunity in the Armed Services on 22 May 1950. The committee argued that segregation was detrimental to the military's efficiency, in contrast to the claims of pro-segregation officials including the Secretary of the Army, Air Force, and Navy.
