= Hong Kong Deposit and Guaranty Bank =

Collapsed bank in Hong Kong

Hong Kong Deposit and Guaranty Bank (HKDG) was a bank of Hong Kong established in 1981 which collapsed in 1984 with estimated losses of $100m. Its $20m capital came from Iran's Ashraf Pahlavi. The bank was founded on 22 January 1981 by John Shaheen, and featured on its board "Herminio Disini, known as Philippine President Ferdinand Marcos's personal bag man." Other directors included "Ghanim Al-Mazrouie, the Abu Dhabi official who controlled 10 percent of the corrupt Bank of Credit and Commerce International (BCCI), and Hassan Yassin, a cousin of Saudi financier Adnan Khashoggi and an adviser to BCCI principal Kamal Adham, the former chief of Saudi Intelligence."

A 1992 US Congressional investigation included as a "matter for further investigation" that "The relationship of important BCCI figures and important intelligence figures to the collapse of the HKDG and Tetra Finance (HK) in 1983. The circumstances surrounding the collapse of these two Hong Kong banks; the Hong Kong banks' practices of using nominees, front-companies, and back-to-back financial transactions; the Hong Banks' directors having included several important BCCI figures, including Ghanim Al Mazrui, and a close associate of then CIA director William J. Casey; all raise the question of whether there was a relationship between these two institutions and BCCI-Hong Kong, and whether the two Hong Kong institutions were used for domestic or foreign intelligence operations."
