= John A. Wells =

American lawyer

- Born: 1908
- Died: April 15, 1980 (aged 71–72)
- Education: Wesleyan University; Oxford University; Harvard Law School
- Occupation: Corporate lawyer
- Known for: Wells notice

Jack A. Wells (1908 - April 15, 1980) was an American corporate lawyer at the New York City, New York-based law firm Royall, Koegel & Wells, a firm that later became Rogers & Wells.

From 1941 to 1942 he served as President of the New York Young Republican Club.

In 1972, William J. Casey, chairman of the United States Securities and Exchange Commission, appointed him to an SEC committee to review and evaluate the commission's enforcement policies and practices. Casey appointed him because he was not a securities lawyer and asked him to be the chairman of the committee, and thus began what we now know as the "Wells Committee". In 1972, the committee proposed the process in which the SEC would notify people or firms ahead of enforcing action on them, also known as the Wells notice.

In 1977, Wells represented the airline Air France in its lawsuit against the Port Authority of New York and New Jersey in trying to get the rights for Concorde flights into New York City's John F. Kennedy International Airport.

== See also ==
- Wells notice
- Attorneys in the United States
- List of people from New York City
