= Rogers & Wells =

American law firm

- Headquarters: New York City
- No. of offices: 7
- No. of attorneys: 400
- Major practice areas: General practice
- Date founded: 1873
- Company type: Limited liability partnership (LLP)
- Dissolved: 2000 (merged with Clifford Chance)

Rogers & Wells was an international law firm founded in New York City in 1873. After several name changes, it was renamed for William P. Rogers and John A. Wells. Firms that merged with it include Dwight, Harris, Koegel & Caskey of New York.

== Background ==
The firm was well known for its litigation arm (second-largest in New York City after white shoe establishment firm Simpson Thacher & Bartlett). It also had an active capital markets and international finance practice, where its main client was Merrill Lynch. The firm at its peak embraced approximately 400 attorneys and maintained offices in New York, Washington, D.C., Los Angeles, Paris, London, Hong Kong, and Frankfurt.

In 1986, Rogers & Wells, the prestigious law firm that paid $40 million to defrauded investors in the J. David financial scandal, closed the San Diego office that embroiled it in the fraud-ridden investment company's affairs.

In 2000, the firm merged with London-based Clifford Chance. The firm practiced as Clifford Chance Rogers & Wells in the Americas until 2003, when the use of the legacy U.S. firm's name was discontinued. Just before and immediately after the merger, some high-profile partners decamped for other firms including New York rival Kaye Scholer. The Paris outpost joined Kramer Levin.

== Notable alumni ==
- Albert II, Prince of Monaco
- Kenneth Chenault, CEO of American Express
- William P. Rogers, US Secretary of State, 1969–1973
- Kenneth C. Royall, US Secretary of the Army, 1947–1949
- William J. Casey, Director of Central Intelligence, 1981–1987
- Roberta Karmel (born 1937), Centennial Professor of Law at Brooklyn Law School, and first female commissioner of the U.S. Securities and Exchange Commission
